= 2013 Pulitzer Prize =

Awards for journalism and related fields

The 2013 Pulitzer Prizes were awarded on April 15, 2013 by the Pulitzer Prize Board for work during the 2012 calendar year.

== Prizes ==
There were 21 prizes awarded in three categories.

=== Journalism ===
Public Service
Sun Sentinel, Fort Lauderdale, FL, "for its well documented investigation of off-duty police officers who recklessly speed and endanger the lives of citizens, leading to disciplinary action and other steps to curtail a deadly hazard."
California Watch "for its exposure of how a state-run police force failed to protect patients in homes for the developmentally disabled who had been beaten, tortured and raped, resulting in new laws and other remedial action."
The Washington Post "for its exploration of flawed evidence in a series of criminal cases prosecuted by the Justice Department that was never disclosed to defendants, causing a review of more than 20,000 cases and other corrective steps."

Breaking News Reporting
The Denver Post Staff "for its comprehensive coverage of the mass shooting at a movie theater in Aurora, Colo., that killed 12 and injured 58, using journalistic tools, from Twitter and Facebook to video and written reports, both to capture a breaking story and provide context."
The Denver Post Staff "for its vivid coverage of a wildfire that destroyed more than 300 homes, combining on-the-ground reporting with imaginative use of digital tools, including a before-and-after interactive feature that helped displaced fire victims determine the fate of their homes before there was official notification."
Hartford Courant Staff "for its complete and sensitive coverage of the shooting massacre at an elementary school in Newtown, Conn., that killed 20 children and 6 adults, using digital tools as well as traditional reporting to tell the story quickly while portraying the stunned community's grief."

Investigative Reporting
David Barstow and Alejandra Xanic von Bertrab of The New York Times for their reports on how Wal-Mart used widespread bribery to dominate the market in Mexico, resulting in changes in company practices.
Patricia Callahan, Sam Roe, and Michael Hawthorne of the Chicago Tribune "for their exposure of manufacturers that imperil public health by continuing to use toxic fire retardants in household furniture and crib mattresses, triggering reform efforts at the state and national level."
Alexandra Zayas of the Tampa Bay Times "for her probe into unlicensed religious group-homes where children were beaten and locked in closet-size rooms for violating senseless rules, prompting action by state authorities."

Explanatory Reporting
The New York Times Staff "for its penetrating look into business practices by Apple and other technology companies that illustrates the darker side of a changing global economy for workers and consumers."
Dan Egan of the Milwaukee Journal Sentinel "for his exhaustive examination of the struggle to keep Asian carp and other invasive species from reaching the Great Lakes and ultimately all of the nation's inland waters, a story enhanced by animated graphics."
Tony Bartelme of The Post and Courier, Charleston, SC, "for his stories that helped readers understand the complex factors driving up their insurance bills."

Local Reporting
Brad Schrade, Jeremy Olson, and Glenn Howatt of the Star Tribune, Minneapolis, "for their powerful reports on the spike in infant deaths at poorly regulated day-care homes, resulting in legislative action to strengthen rules."
Ames Alexander and Karen Garloch of The Charlotte (N.C.) Observer and Joseph Neff and David Raynor of The News and Observer, Raleigh, North Carolina "for their tenacious joint project investigating how the state's major nonprofit hospitals generate large profits and contribute to the high cost of health care."
David Breen, Stephen Hudak, Jeff Kunerth, and Denise-Marie Ordway of the Orlando Sentinel "for their aggressive coverage of hazing rituals by the Florida A&M University marching band that killed a drum major and led to the resignation of the band leader and the university president."

National Reporting
Lisa Song, Elizabeth McGowan, and David Hasemyer of InsideClimate News, Brooklyn "for their rigorous reports on flawed regulation of the nation's oil pipelines, focusing on potential ecological dangers posed by diluted bitumen (or "dilbit"), a controversial form of oil."
Liz Kowalczyk, Carolyn Johnson, Todd Wallack, Patricia Wen, and Kay Lazar of The Boston Globe "for their aggressive coverage of the deadly national outbreak of fungal meningitis traced to a compounding pharmacy in suburban Boston, revealing how the medical regulatory system failed to safeguard patients."
Craig Whitlock, Greg Miller, Karen DeYoung, and Julie Tate of The Washington Post, "for their fresh exploration of how American drones moved from a temporary means to kill terrorists to a permanent weapon of war, raising issues of legality and accountability."

International Reporting
David Barboza of The New York Times "for his striking exposure of corruption at high levels of the Chinese government, including billions in secret wealth owned by relatives of the prime minister, well documented work published in the face of heavy pressure from the Chinese officials."
The Associated Press Staff "for its brave portrayal of the chaotic civil war in Syria, using text stories as well as multimedia tools to provide on-the-ground accounts as well as wider context, often at personal peril to the journalists."
Richard Marosi of the Los Angeles Times "for his provocative articles on the fate of thousands of illegal Mexican immigrants deported by the United States in recent years, many who are living desperate lives along the U.S.-Mexico border."

Feature Writing
John Branch of The New York Times "for his evocative narrative about skiers killed in an avalanche and the science that explains such disasters, a project enhanced by its deft integration of multimedia elements."
Kelley Benham of the Tampa Bay Times "for her searing personal account of the survival of her premature baby, born barely viable at 1 pound, 4 ounces, and her exploration of the costs and ethics of extreme medical intervention."
Eli Saslow of The Washington Post "for his moving portrait of a struggling swimming pool salesman that illustrates the daily emotional toll of the nation's economic downturn."

Commentary
Bret Stephens of The Wall Street Journal "for his incisive columns on American foreign policy and domestic politics, often enlivened by a contrarian twist."
Juliette Kayyem of The Boston Globe "for her colorful, well reported columns on an array of issues, from women in combat to oil drilling in Alaska."
Mark Di Ionno of The Star-Ledger, Newark, N.J., "for his hard hitting columns on Hurricane Sandy, the death of a gay college student and other local events and issues."

Criticism
Philip Kennicott of The Washington Post "for his eloquent and passionate essays on art and the social forces that underlie it, a critic who always strives to make his topics and targets relevant to readers."
Mary McNamara of the Los Angeles Times "for her searching television criticism that often becomes a springboard for provocative comments on the culture at large."
Manohla Dargis of The New York Times "for her enlightening movie criticism, vividly written and showing deep understanding of the business and art of filmmaking."

Editorial Writing
Tim Nickens and Daniel Ruth of the Tampa Bay Times "for their diligent campaign that helped reverse a decision to end fluoridation of the water supply for the 700,000 residents of the newspaper's home county."
Staff of Newsday, Long Island, NY, "for its editorials in the chaotic wake of Hurricane Sandy, providing a voice of reason, hope and indignation as recovery began and the future challenge of limiting shoreline devastation emerged."
Jackson Diehl of The Washington Post "for his passionate editorials on the civil conflict in Syria, arguing for greater engagement by the United States to help stop bloodshed in a strategic Arab nation."

Editorial Cartooning
Steve Sack of the Star Tribune, Minneapolis "for his diverse collection of cartoons, using an original style and clever ideas to drive home his unmistakable point of view."
Clay Bennett of the Chattanooga (Tenn.) Times Free Press "for polished, witty cartoons that effectively lampoon prominent leaders and groups in a polarized America."
Jeff Darcy of The Plain Dealer, Cleveland, "for his fresh portfolio of cartoons that feature deft caricatures and leave no one guessing where he stands on important issues."

Breaking News Photography
Rodrigo Abd, Manu Brabo, Narciso Contreras, Khalil Hamra, and Muhammed Muheisen of the Associated Press "for their compelling coverage of the civil war in Syria, producing memorable images under extreme hazard."
The Denver Post Staff "for its skillful coverage of the mass shooting at a theater in Aurora, Colo., capturing the scope of the tragedy in a poignant portfolio of pictures."
Tyler Hicks of The New York Times "for his powerful pictures chronicling deadly destruction in Gaza following a retaliatory bombing by Israel."

Feature Photography
Javier Manzano, a free-lance photographer, "for his extraordinary picture, distributed by Agence France-Presse, of two Syrian rebel soldiers tensely guarding their position as beams of light stream through bullet holes in a nearby metal wall"
Liz O. Baylen of the Los Angeles Times "for her intimate essay, shot in shadowy black and white, documenting the shattered lives of people entangled in prescription drug abuse."
Renee C. Byer of The Sacramento Bee "for her heartwarming photographs of a grandfather raising three grandchildren after the violent death of his daughter and the loss of his wife to cancer."

=== Letters and drama ===
Fiction
The Orphan Master's Son by Adam Johnson (Random House), "an exquisitely crafted novel that carries the reader on an adventuresome journey into the depths of totalitarian North Korea and into the most intimate spaces of the human heart."
What We Talk About When We Talk About Anne Frank by Nathan Englander (Alfred A. Knopf), "a diverse yet consistently masterful collection of stories that explore Jewish identity and questions of modern life in ways that can both delight and unsettle the reader."
The Snow Child by Eowyn Ivey (Reagan Arthur/Little, Brown), "an enchanting novel about an older homesteading couple who long for a child amid the harsh wilderness of Alaska and a feral girl who emerges from the woods to bring them hope."

Drama
Disgraced by Ayad Akhtar, "a moving play that depicts a successful corporate lawyer painfully forced to consider why he has for so long camouflaged his Pakistani Muslim heritage."
Rapture, Blister, Burn by Gina Gionfriddo, "a searing comedy that examines the psyches of two women in midlife as they ruefully question the differing choices they have made."
4000 Miles by Amy Herzog, "a drama that shows acute understanding of human idiosyncrasy as a spiky 91-year-old locks horns with her rudderless 21-year-old grandson who shows up at her Greenwich Village apartment after a disastrous cross-country bike trip."

History
Embers of War: The Fall of an Empire and the Making of America's Vietnam by Fredrik Logevall (Random House), "a balanced, deeply researched history of how, as French colonial rule faltered, a succession of American leaders moved step by step down a road toward full-blown war."
The Barbarous Years: The Peopling of British North America: The Conflict of Civilizations, 1600-1675 by Bernard Bailyn (Alfred A. Knopf), "a luminous account of how the British colonies took root amid raw brutality, often with terrible consequences for the settlers as well as the native population."
Lincoln's Code: The Laws of War in American History by John Fabian Witt (Free Press), "a striking work examining how orders issued by President Lincoln to govern conduct on battlefields and in prisons during the Civil War have shaped modern laws of armed conflict."

Biography or Autobiography
The Black Count: Glory, Revolution, Betrayal, and the Real Count of Monte Cristo by Tom Reiss (Crown) "a compelling story of a forgotten swashbuckling hero of mixed race whose bold exploits were captured by his son, Alexandre Dumas, in famous 19th century novels."
Portrait of a Novel: Henry James and the Making of an American Masterpiece by Michael Gorra (Liveright), "an elegant and enlightening book that brings together the complicated life of a great author and the evolution of his great novel, The Portrait of a Lady."
The Patriarch: The Remarkable Life and Turbulent Times of Joseph P. Kennedy by David Nasaw (Penguin), "a monumental work that tells the story of the relentless tycoon who created a dynastic family that helped shape modern American history and also suffered immense tragedy."

Poetry
Stag's Leap by Sharon Olds (Alfred A. Knopf), "a book of unflinching poems on the author's divorce that examine love, sorrow and the limits of self-knowledge."
Collected Poems by the late Jack Gilbert (Alfred A. Knopf), "a half century of poems reflecting a creative author's commitment to living fully and honestly and to producing straightforward work that illuminates everyday experience with startling clarity."
The Abundance of Nothing by Bruce Weigl (TriQuarterly Books/Northwestern University Press), "a powerful collection of poems that explore the trauma of the Vietnam War and the feelings that have never left many of those who fought in the conflict."

General Nonfiction
Devil in the Grove: Thurgood Marshall, the Groveland Boys, and the Dawn of a New America by Gilbert King (Harper), "a richly detailed chronicle of racial injustice in the Florida town of Groveland in 1949, involving four black men falsely accused of rape and drawing a civil rights crusader, and eventual Supreme Court justice, into the legal battle."
Behind the Beautiful Forevers: Life, Death and Hope in a Mumbai Undercity by Katherine Boo (Random House), "an engrossing book that plunges the reader into an Indian slum in the shadow of gleaming hotels near Mumbai's airport, revealing a complex subculture where poverty does not extinguish aspiration."
The Forest Unseen: A Year's Watch in Nature by David George Haskell (Viking), "a fascinating book that, for a year, closely follows the natural wonders occurring within a tiny patch of old-growth Tennessee forest."

=== Music ===
Pulitzer Prize for Music
Caroline Shaw for Partita for 8 Voices "a highly polished and inventive a cappella work uniquely embracing speech, whispers, sighs, murmurs, wordless melodies and novel vocal effects."
Aaron Jay Kernis for Pieces of Winter Sky "a luminous work that takes listeners into a mystical realm marked by taut expressive control and extraordinarily subtle changes of tone, texture and nuance."
Wadada Leo Smith for Ten Freedom Summers "an expansive jazz work that memorializes 10 key moments in the history of civil rights in America, fusing composed and improvised passages into powerful, eloquent music."

=== Special Citation ===
Not awarded in 2013.
