= Santiago Lyon =

Photographer and photo editor

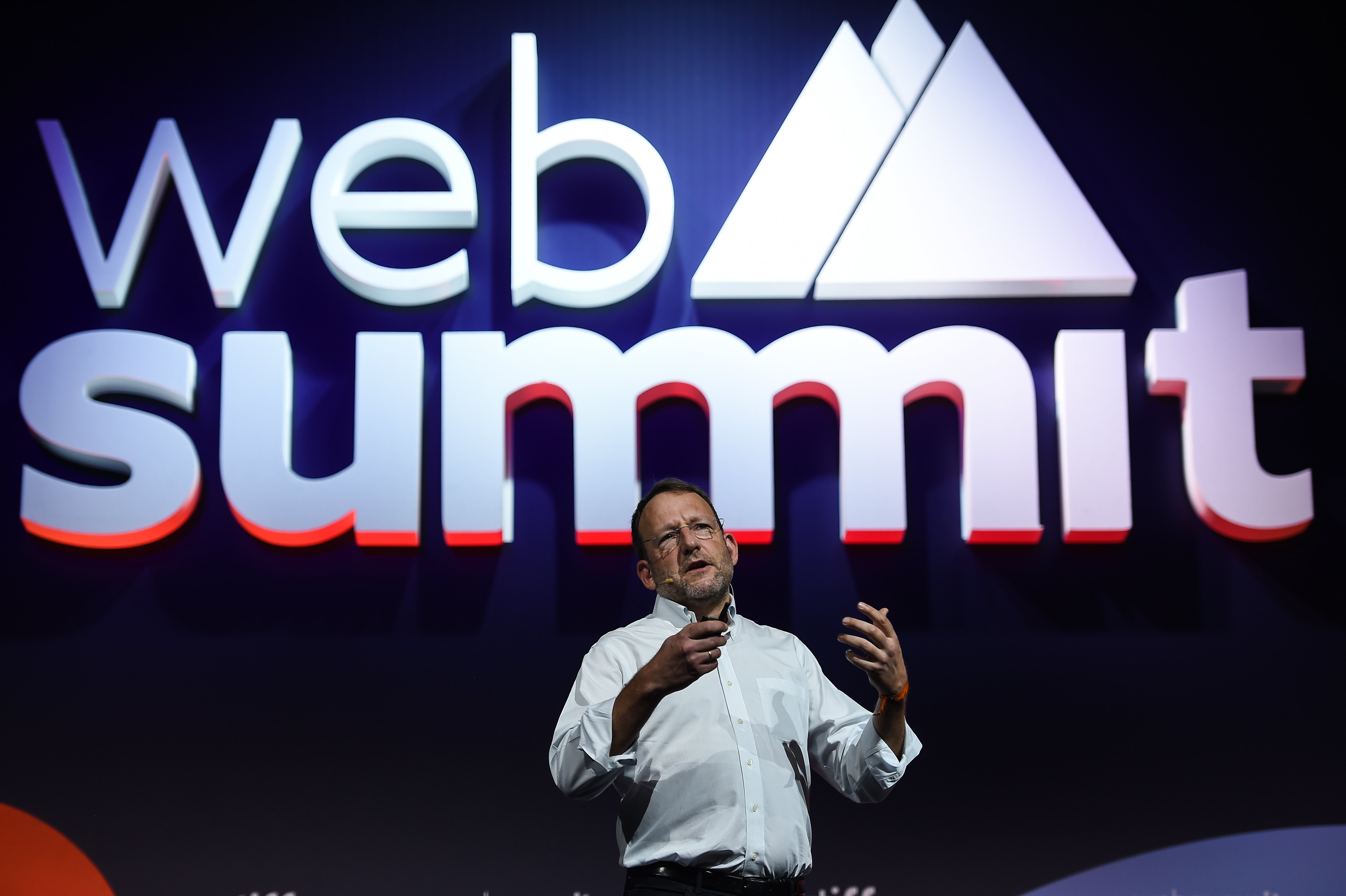
Santiago Lyon, Director of Editorial Content, Adobe on the creatiff Stage during the opening day of Web Summit 2018 at the Altice Arena in Lisbon, Portugal. Photo by Eóin Noonan/Web Summit via Sportsfile (6, November 2018)

Santiago Lyon, retired since July 2026, was Head of Advocacy and Education for the Content Authenticity Initiative, an Adobe-led community of major media and technology companies developing open-source technology to fight mis/disinformation. From 2003 to 2016 he was vice president and Director of Photography of The Associated Press responsible for the AP's global photo report and the photographers and photo editors around the world who produce it. From 1984 to 2003 he was a photographer and photo editor.

== Biography and career ==
Born in Madrid, Spain to American parents and raised in Ireland, Lyon has ~40 years of experience in photography and has won multiple photojournalism awards for his coverage of conflicts around the globe - including two World Press Photo prizes and the Bayeux prize for war photography.

He covered the end of the civil war in El Salvador, the U.S. invasion of Panama, the first Gulf War, the Balkan wars in Croatia, Bosnia and Kosovo, the civil wars in Somalia and Yemen as well as the Taliban takeover of Afghanistan among other major news and sports stories around the world.

He joined the Associated Press in 1991 in Cairo after previously having worked for the Spanish news agency EFE, United Press International and Reuters.

Lyon served as the Associated Press photo editor for Spain and Portugal from 1995 until 2003, when he was named director of photography. In the same year, he was a Nieman Fellow in journalism at Harvard University.

Under his direction, the AP won three Pulitzer Prizes for photography as well as numerous other major photojournalism awards around the world.

In 2005, the Associated Press earned its 29th Pulitzer Prize for photography, for work on the war in Iraq by a team of eleven photographers, five of them Iraqis.

In 2007, the Associated Press won its 30th Pulitzer Prize for photography, for a single image made by Oded Balilty.

In 2013, the AP won its 31st Pulitzer Prize for photography for work on the civil war in Syria by five photographers, Rodrigo Abd, Manu Brabo, Narciso Contreras, Khalil Hamra and Muhammed Muheisen.

Lyon was part of a small team of AP executives who traveled repeatedly to North Korea to negotiate the successful opening of an AP bureau in Pyongyang.

Lyon serves on the board of directors of the Eddie Adams Workshop and the VII Foundation. He teaches regularly at the International Center of Photography in New York.

He was chair of the jury for the 2013 World Press Photo contest.

In 2012, he was a Sulzberger Fellow at Columbia University in New York, studying ways to enhance the value of the AP's photo output to better serve growing customer segments.

In late 2016 he left the AP, joining Adobe in September 2017 as their first director of editorial content a position tasked with developing and growing Adobe's photojournalism offering to its customers.

He is married to Emma Daly, an executive at Human Rights Watch. They live in New York City with their two children.
