= Snow Fall =

"Snow Fall: The Avalanche at Tunnel Creek"
- Short story by John Branch
- Country: United States
- Language: English
- Genre: Multimedia feature/Long-form journalism

Publication
- Publisher: The New York Times
- Publication date: 2012

"Snow Fall: The Avalanche at Tunnel Creek", is a New York Times multimedia feature by reporter John Branch about the 2012 Tunnel Creek avalanche, published on December 20, 2012. The article won the 2013 Pulitzer Prize in Feature Writing and a Peabody Award. Packaged together as a six-part story interwoven with interactive graphics, animated simulations and aerial video, "Snow Fall" became one of the most talked about online news articles in 2013 and garnered praise and debate over it being an example of "the future of online journalism". The article became highly influential among online journalism circles, with many other publications attempting similar multimedia features and even coined an industry term, "to snowfall".

== Origins ==
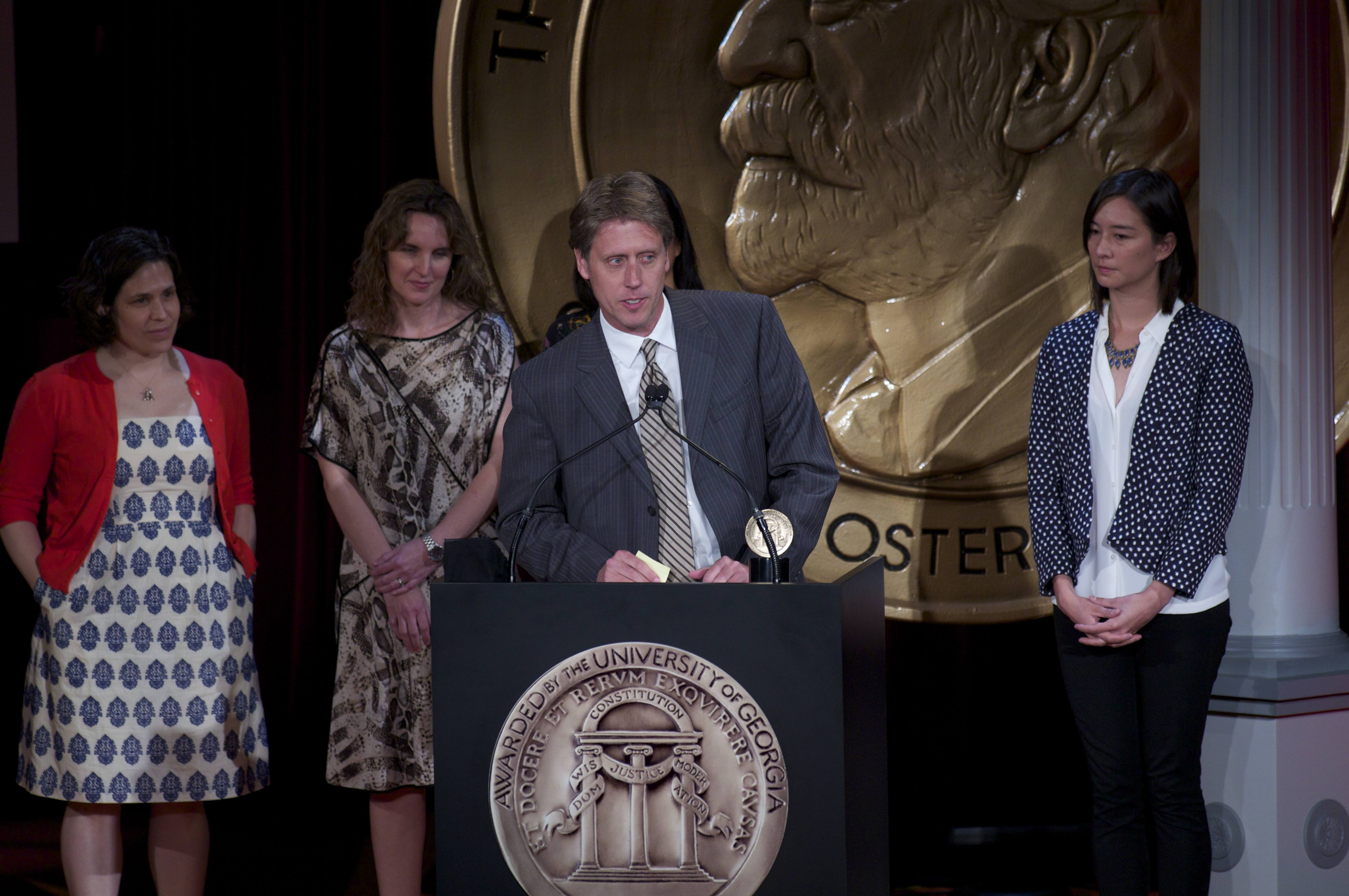
John Branch accepting the Peabody Award in 2013.

In a Q&A with New York Times readers published the day after "Snow Fall"'s launch, Branch described how the story evolved beyond a traditional news article. "Credit Joe Sexton, the sports editor, with seeing something bigger," Branch explained. "A couple of days after the avalanche in February, The Times had a front-page article about the recent spate of avalanche deaths, particularly among expert skiers. To most editors, that would have been more than enough. But Joe saw the potential for telling the story in a more powerful, yet narrower, way. And he assigned me the task. The key was the cooperation of those involved. Every one of them opened his or her heart to me, a stranger with only a loose idea of where the story might head. They were honest and gracious and trusting. And when I returned with their stories, and we saw how their various perspectives of the same avalanche wove together, we invited the smart people in our interactive and graphics departments to help with the telling."

== Format ==
A graphics and design team of eleven staffers worked on the feature (including a photographer, three video staffers, and a researcher), taking more than six months to assemble the piece.

Digital Designer Andrew Kueneman said that running a full-screen piece with various media required the newspaper to publish outside of its typical content management system. "This story was not produced in our normal CMS," Kueneman explained. "We don't have the luxury of doing this type of design typically on the web. Now we just have more options and more tools."

Graphics Director Steve Duenes told Poynter that the format presented "ways to allow readers to read into, and then through multimedia, and then out of multimedia. So it didn't feel like you were taking a detour, but the multimedia was part of the one narrative flow." "The experience sort of absorbs you," Duenes added. "That was really the intention – to try to get closer to a seamless and coherent article that included all of the elements that made the article strong."

Poynter's Jeff Sonderman explained that a flyover animation transported the reader to the mountains and ski areas where the story takes place. "Graphics Editor Jeremy White gathered LIDAR elevation data and satellite imagery for the terrain, created a virtual model and then generated the animation," Sonderman detailed. "And there is a small bio card that accompanies the introduction of each character, showing his or her photo, name, age and occupation. Clicking the card opens a hovering slideshow that helps you get to know that person better."

== Reaction ==
"Snow Fall" became a sensation in journalism circles. NYU's Jay Rosen called it "a break point in online journalism."

The feature won the 2013 Pulitzer Prize in Feature Writing and a Peabody Award, which called it a "spectacular example of the potential of digital-age storytelling, the web site combines thorough traditional reporting of a deadly avalanche with stunning topographic video."

== Influence in the journalism industry ==
The feature inspired the Times to appoint Sam Sifton "Snowfaller in Chief," expanding multimedia narratives in the newsroom in the tradition of '"Snow Fall".
