= Lisa Song =

American journalist and author

- Education: Massachusetts Institute of Technology
- Occupation: Journalist
- Employer: ProPublica
- Awards: Pulitzer Prize

Lisa Song is an American journalist and author. She won the 2013 Pulitzer Prize for National Reporting, with David Hasemyer and Elizabeth McGowan, for their report on the Kalamazoo River oil spill. She works for ProPublica, reporting on the environment, energy and climate change.

== Background and career ==
Song graduated from Massachusetts Institute of Technology, receiving her Bachelor's in environmental science in 2008, and her Master's in science writing in 2009.

She worked for Inside Climate News, focusing on oil and gas drilling, environmental health, and climate science from January 2011 through February 2017. During her time with Inside Climate, she contributed to the "Dilbit Disaster" Pulitzer prize-winning series in 2013, the "Big Oil" stories, and the Exxon series, which was nominated as a finalist for the Pulitzer Prize for Public Service in 2016. She also won three other awards, including the Edgar A. Poe Award.

Song left Inside Climate in 2017 to report for ProPublica, covering energy, the environment and climate change. She has also worked as a freelance journalist, writing for news magazines and journals, including, High Country News, Scientific American, New Scientist and Living on Earth.

== Awards and recognition ==
=== 2013: Dilbit series ===
During her time with InsideClimate News, she won the 2013 Pulitzer Prize for National Reporting with David Hasemyer and Elizabeth McGowan, for their reporting on the Kalamazoo River oil spill.

The 3-part series, and follow up stories, were the result of a 15-month investigation on pipeline safety and Dilbit, a controversial form of oil. In the cover letter for entry to the prize, dilbit, is described as "a thick Canadian hydrocarbon called bitumen that is diluted with liquid chemicals so that it can flow through pipes." The pipeline already had corrosion problems and it was more than a week before the EPA knew that they were dealing with dilbit, because the pipeline operators weren't required to tell first responders in the event of a spill; dilbit is different from normal oil, in that the chemicals evaporate and the thick, different form of oil, sinks to the bottom and is very difficult to clean up. The series and follow-up reporting is listed below.

- "The Dilbit Disaster: Inside the biggest oil spill you've never heard of, Part 1," Elizabeth McGowan and Lisa Song, InsideClimate News, June 26, 2012.
- "The Dilbit Disaster: Inside the biggest oil spill you've never heard of, Part 2," Elizabeth McGowan and Lisa Song, InsideClimate News, June 27, 2012.
- "The Dilbit Disaster: Inside the biggest oil spill you've never heard of, Part 3," Elizabeth McGowan and Lisa Song, InsideClimate News, June 28, 2012.
- "Epilogue: Cleanup, Consequences and Lives Changed in the Dilbit Disaster," Elizabeth McGowan and Lisa Song, InsideClimate News, June 29, 2012.
- "New Pipeline Safety Regulations Won't Apply to Keystone XL," Elizabeth McGowan and Lisa Song, InsideClimate News, July 26, 2012.
- "Angry Michigan Residents Fight Uneven Battle Against Pipeline Project on Their Land," David Hasemeyer, InsideClimate News, September 12, 2012.
- "Few Oil Pipeline Spills Detected by Much-Touted Technology," Lisa Song, InsideClimate News, September 19, 2012.
- "EPA Worries Dilbit Still a Threat to Kalamazoo River, More than 2 Years After Spill," David Hasemeyer, InsideClimate News, October 11, 2012.
- "Keystone XL Would Not Use Most Advanced Spill Protection Technology," Lisa Song, InsideClimate News, December 20, 2012.
- "Little Oversight for Enbridge Pipeline Route that Skirts Lake Michigan," Lisa Song and David Hasemyer, InsideClimate News, December 27, 2012.

When the 2013 Pulitzer prize winners were announced, InsideClimate News, was one of the least known of the digital news organizations; Politico's headline described the win in their headline, "For a scrappy environmental-news startup, journalism's most prestigious award." Digital-only prizes had only been awarded since 2009 and very few had won. According to the cover letter, in the entry for the prize, the investigations stemmed from research that Lisa Song had originally began, and McGowan and Hasemyer joined in shortly after.

Song was just 26 years old, when she won the Pulitzer. Additional awards are listed below:

- 2012 Finalist for the Scripps Howard Nation's Best 2012 Journalism Awards, for Environmental Reporting, (with Elizabeth McGowan and David Hasemyer) for "Dilbit Disaster: Inside The Biggest Oil Spill You've Never Heard Of," InsideClimate News.
- 2012 Honorable Mention, John B. Oakes Award for Distinguished Environmental Journalism, (with Elizabeth McGowan and David Hasemyer) for "Dilbit Disaster: Inside The Biggest Oil Spill You've Never Heard Of."
- 2013 Winner James Aronson Award for Social Justice Reporting, (with Elizabeth McGowan and David Hasemyer) for "Dilbit Disaster: Inside The Biggest Oil Spill You've Never Heard Of," InsideClimate News.
- 2013 Deadline Club, NYC Chapter of the Society of Professional Journalists for Reporting by Independent Digital Media (with Elizabeth McGowan) for "Dilbit Disaster: Inside The Biggest Oil Spill You've Never Heard Of," InsideClimate News.

=== 2014: Big oil story ===
In 2014 Song and her colleagues at InsideClimate, Jim Morris and David Hasemyer, received the Philip Meyer Journalism Award for Social Science for "Big Oil, Bad Air: Fracking the Eagle Ford Shale of South Texas." They also won the Thomas L. Stokes Award for Best Energy and Environmental Writing, from the National Press Foundation for the same story.

The story exposed how vulnerable, residents are to health risks of the largely unregulated activities around an area known as the Eagle Ford Shale play, a 400-mile-long, 50-mile-wide area of more than 7,000 oil and gas structures, wells, and drilling sites, from Leon County, Texas, in to the Mexican border. Eagle Ford one of the most active drilling sites in America.

Additional awards for the "Big Oil, Bad Air" series and follow up stories are listed below.

- 2014 Editor & Publisher EPPY Award for Best Investigative/Feature on a Website, (with David Hasemyer)
- 2015 Association of Health Care Journalists Award for Large Investigation, (with David Hasemyer and Jim Morris)
- 2015 Finalist Investigative Reporters & Editors Award for Large Multimedia (with David Hasemyer, Susan White, Zahra Hirji, Paul Horn, Lance Rosenfield, Sabrina Shankman, Marcus Stern, John Bolger, and Hannah Robbins) and members of Center for Public Integrity, and The Weather Channel for their collaboration in bringing national attention to the story.
- 2015 Society of Professional Journalists, Sigma Delta Chi Award for informational Graphics, (with Paul Horn)
- 2015 Loeb Award for Explanatory Reporting, (staff of InsideClimate News)
- 2015 The Kevin Carmody Award for Outstanding In-depth Reporting (Large Market), from the Society of Environmental Journalists, staff of InsideClimate News, The Center for Public Integrity and The Weather Channel.
- 2016 Knight-Risser Prize for Western Environmental Journalism, staff of InsideClimate News, The Center for Public Integrity and The Weather Channel.

=== 2016: Exxon series ===
In 2016, Song, and her fellow journalists were finalists for the Pulitzer Prize for Public Service. The series of stories were the result of an 8-month investigation into Exxon's climate change stance.

After conducting dozens of interviews and examining company memos from as far back as the 1970s, and hundreds of internal documents, InsideCimate published a series of 9-stories, "Exxon: The Road Not Taken." The publication of the series resulted in the Attorney General of New York, issuing a subpoena to Exxon, in order to look into the possibility of fraud. They were also finalists for the Goldsmith Prize for Investigative Reporting.

They received the following awards for the same series:

- (2015) Thomas L. Stokes Award for Best Environmental Writing
- The Thomas L. Stokes Award for Best Energy Writing
- Co-Winner in the Digital Investigative, Division I, Society of American Business Editors and Writers Award
- Robert F. Kennedy Award, New Media Winner
- John B. Oakes Award
- The Kevin Carmody Award for Outstanding In-depth Reporting, (small market) Society of Environmental Journalists
- The Edgar A. Poe Award, presented to them at the annual White House Correspondents Dinner, by President Barack Obama and the First Lady Michelle Obama.
- The Izzy Award for Outstanding Achievement in Independent Media
- The Scripps Howard Edward J. Meeman Award for Outstanding Environmental Journalism. In awarding the prize for their reporting on Exxon, the judges commented on the reporting, saying:

"For the past 20 years Exxon has worked to discredit climate science. But, as we learn from InsideClimate News' compelling series, the company had evidence suggesting the opposite was true. From its own scientists. For years."

The ExxonMobil climate change controversy is still ongoing. As of 2020, ExxonMobil still denies any wrongdoing in voicing their opinion on climate policy, claiming that activist organizations are seeking to punish the company, and coordinating an attack campaign on social media, using the hashtag #ExxonKnew.

An ExxonMobil website disputes the reporting, citing several law experts, newsreports, and opinion columns, including New York Post, The Wall Street Journal, New York Daily News, The Dallas Morning News, Bloomberg View, USA Today, and Boston Herald. Exxon also has its own timeline of events on their website.

The series of reports by the staff of ClimateChange News, including the documents they used, are listed below.

- Exxon's Own Research Confirmed Fossil Fuels' Role in Global warming Decades Ago
- Exxon Believed Deep Dive Into Climate Research Would Protect Its Business
- Exxon Confirmed Global Warming Consensus in 1982 with In-House Climate Models
- Exxon's Business Ambition Collided with Climate Change Under a Distant Sea
- Highlighting the Allure of Synfuels, Exxon Played Down the Climate Risks
- Exxon Sowed Doubt About Climate Science for Decades by Stressing Uncertainty
- Exxon Made Deep Cuts in Climate Research Budget in the 1980s
- More Exxon Documents Show How Much it Knew About Climate 35 Years Ago
- Exxon's Oil Industry Peers Knew About Climate Dangers in the 1970s Too
- Internal Documents published by InsideClimate News

== Bibliography ==
- Big Oil + Bad Air: Fracking's Toxic Footprint, Song, Hasemyer, Morris, Mann, Horn, InsideClimate News, March 26, 2014.
- Exxon: The Road Not Taken, Banerjee, Cushman Jr., Hasemyer and Song, InsideClimate News, 2015.
- The Dilbit Disaster: Inside The Biggest Oil Spill You've Never Heard Of, McGowan, Song and Hasemyer, CreateSpace Independent Publishing Platform, October 19, 2016.
