= To the Bright Edge of the World =

2016 novel by Eowyn Ivey

- Author: Eowyn Ivey
- Language: English
- Genre: Historical fiction
- Publisher: Back Bay Books
- Publication date: August 2, 2016
- Pages: 420
- ISBN: 978-0-316-24283-7
- OCLC: 965760122

To the Bright Edge of the World is a 2016 historical fiction book by Eowyn Ivey. It was published in 2016 by Back Bay Books.

== Background and summary ==
Set in 1880s Alaska, the book tells the story about the fictional Lieutenant Colonel Allen Forrester and his wife, Sophie. The two characters are separated, with Allen in Alaska and Sophie in the Vancouver Barracks. The story takes the form of an epistolatory novel, being told through letters, diary entries, and other written documents that are being collated by modern-day museum curator Josh Sloan, and Allen Forrester's great-nephew Walter Forrester.

The story of Allen was originally based on an 1885 Army expedition along Alaska's Copper River, led by Henry Tureman Allen. In a 2016 interview, Ivey said that Sophie's part of the story, especially her desire to pursue photography, was also inspired by early female photographers such as ornithologist Cordelia Stanwood.

== Publication history ==
To the Bright Edge of the World was released by Back Bay Books, and imprint of Little, Brown, and Company. An unabridged audio version voiced by John Glouchevich, Kiff Vandenheuvel, and Christine Lakin was released by Hachette Audio.

== Reception ==
In a Seattle Times review, David Takami praised Ivey's writing and story-telling. He described relationship between the two main characters as a "moving love story", a story that was made stronger by Ivey's decision to have the characters only communicate to each other in letters. Geraldine Brooks, in The Guardian, also complimented Ivey's skills as a writer and the "compelling" stories of Sophie and Allen. In her review, novelist Amy Greene also praised the story, but said that the novel's "foremost strength may be its contemporary relevance".

A review by Shawna Seed the Dallas Morning News also described the book positively, saying that although Ivey's had chosen a "difficult path", referencing Ivey's use of the epistolary format and decision to tell stories about Alaska Native characters and mythology through white characters, Ivey had ultimately used the format successful and avoided romanticizing Alaska Native history. Seed also praised Ivey's handling of sexism and feminism in the novel.

Molly Hagan, in Magill's Literary Annual, compared the themes of the book, particularly its incorporation of magical realism, to Ivey's previous novel The Snow Child. She also noted the two different roles Sophie's miscarriage served in the plot, saying it had a "satisfying symmetry". However, she was also more critical of the ending, saying that Ivey "overshoots the mark" and left the ending potentially "too neat". She also criticized the lack of depth in Sophie and Allen's characters, writing that "their personalities remain uncomplicated by ambiguous deeds".

In a review published in the Milwaukee Journal Sentinel, Mike Fischer said that the characters challenged their readers "to see the mystery in everyday life". He was more critical of her the book's progression, saying that Ivey had written it with "so much respect and such attention to detail that it often fails to breathe".

Publishers Weekly praised the voice acting in the audio book version, in particular highlighting Christine Larkin's performance as Sophie Forrester.
