= Clare Morgana Gillis =

American journalist

- Occupation: Journalist
- Known for: Held hostage in Libya (April 5 – May 18, 2011)

Clare Morgana Gillis is an American journalist. On April 5, 2011, Gillis was traveling with an anti-Gaddafi militia force, with fellow journalists James Foley, Manu Brabo and Anton Hammerl, during the collapse of the Muammar Gaddafi regime, when they were attacked by a rival group. Hammerl died during the initial attack. Gillis, Foley and Brabo were held as hostages.

== Life ==
Gillis graduated from Hopkins School in New Haven, Connecticut in 1994, and afterwards attended the University of Chicago where she received her B.A. in English Language and Literature. She also attended the University of Iceland as a Fulbright Scholar. Gillis had delivered the Doctoral dissertation in medieval history that earned her her PhD from Harvard University a year before her capture.

Gillis was dragged by her hair, and beaten, by the fighters who captured her on April 5, 2011.

The rump of the Libyan government gave Gillis and her colleagues a one-year suspended sentence when it released them on May 18, 2011, six weeks after their capture.

Gillis appeared before the United States Senate's Judiciary Committee on July 28, 2011, when it was considering a bill on improving US compliance with its obligations to provide consular access to foreigners the US government arrests. She told the Senators that her own safe release had relied on her access to Hungarian diplomats.

In an interview with WNYC Gillis compared the level of violence she saw in Libya with the violence one sees from those raised in families that experienced domestic violence.

== See also ==
- List of Americans wrongfully imprisoned or detained abroad
