= The Upshot =

Website published by The New York Times

The Upshot is a website published by The New York Times which releases articles combining data visualization with conventional journalistic analysis of news.

== History ==
The Upshot was first announced in March 2014 and was officially launched on April 22, 2014. Steve Duenes, a graphics director at the New York Times, won a newsroom contest by coming up with the name "The Upshot". The site started with fifteen full-time staff, including founding editor David Leonhardt. Because The Upshot was launched soon after Nate Silver and FiveThirtyEight left the Times, it was widely described as a planned replacement for FiveThirtyEight and Silver. However, Leonhardt stated in an April 2014 interview that The Upshot was not intended to replace Silver. In 2014, The Upshot produced two of the twenty most-read stories on the Times' website, and it was responsible for 5% of the paper's web traffic in October of that year. Also in 2014, the site was a finalist for an Online Journalism Award in the category "Online Commentary, Large Newsroom", but it lost to NPR's Code Switch. In 2016, Amanda Cox, who had been a founding member of The Upshot, replaced Leonhardt as its editor.
