= Eric Wetherell =

British composer

Eric David Wetherell (30 December 1925 – 31 January 2021) was a British composer, conductor, radio producer and author on musical subjects.

Wetherell was born in Tynemouth and attended Carlisle Grammar School for Boys. As a teenager he acted as assistant organist to Dr F.W. Wadeley at Carlisle Cathedral. He studied at Queen's College Oxford where his teachers included Thomas Armstrong, Bernard Rose and Egon Wellesz, and afterwards at the Royal College of Music with Harold Darke (organ), Herbert Howells (composition) and Gordon Jacob (orchestration).

Wetherell joined the London Philharmonic Orchestra in 1949 as a French Horn player, spending the next decade playing in various orchestras under conductors such as Thomas Beecham, Adrian Boult, Serge Koussevitzky and others. In 1960 he joined the Royal Opera House, Covent Garden as a répétiteur, then became Assistant Musical Director and conductor with Welsh National Opera in 1963. In the 1970s he served as musical director for Harlech Television for six years, where he provided incidental music to HTV programmes including Thick as Thieves (1971), Michael Hardwick's The Inheritors (1974) and Sky (1975). He later became a senior music producer at the BBC.

In 1976 he was appointed as the final conductor of the BBC Northern Ireland Orchestra, taking over from Kenneth Alwyn. He was there for six years until the orchestra was absorbed into the Ulster Orchestra in 1981. His interest in jazz also led to his conducting, arranging and producing for the BBC Big Band, with frequent appearances on Friday Night is Music Night in the 1970s. Wetherell also formed his own jazz quartet, playing piano.

As an author he completed various musical biographies on Arnold Cooke, Patrick Hadley, his teacher Gordon Jacob and Albert Sammons, and was a contributor to Grove’s Dictionary of Music. He composed throughout his life, but particularly after his retirement from the BBC in 1985, when his home was in Bristol.

He was married twice: in 1949 to Jean Mary Bettany (one son, one daughter), and then in 1976 to the poet Elizabeth Major (two daughters), who provided texts for many of his works, including his two operas A Foreign Field and The Snow Child. He died at the age of 95. A memorial concert was held at St Mary Redcliffe Church on 19 November 2022. A memoir, Having A Hand In It, was published in 2022.

== Selected works ==
- Bristol Quay (1987), suite for string orchestra.
- Bushes and Briars, choral orchestral work commissioned by the Britten Sinfonia.
- A Christmas Cantata (2013) for girl's choir, text Elizabeth Major
- Concerto for alto saxophone and strings (2010)
- The Diaries of Adam and Eve (2000), an entertainment for two actors, chorus and chamber orchestra, text by Elizabeth Major, based on two short stories by Mark Twain.
- A Foreign Field (2010), three-act opera set in the First World War, based on the book by Ben Macintyre.
- A Matching of Powers (2003) for soprano, baritone and orchestra, soprano, and baritone, commissioned by the New Bristol Sinfonia, text Elizabeth Major.
- Missa Brevis, first performance, All Saints Durham Road, East Finchley, 25 November 2018.
- Portrait of a City (world premiere 2022) for orchestra, inspired by Bristol.
- The Snow Child (2014), an opera in two acts, based on the novel by Eowyn Ivey.
- Three Shakespeare Sonnets (1994), jazz influenced.
- We Are the Women (2001), song cycle focused on the First World War, text Elizabeth Major.
