= Balladz =

2022 poetry collection by Sharon Olds

- Author: Sharon Olds
- Publisher: Knopf
- Publication date: October 4, 2022
- Pages: 192
- ISBN: 978-1524711610
- Preceded by: Arias

Balladz is a 2022 poetry collection by Sharon Olds, published by Knopf. The book was a finalist for the 2022 National Book Award for Poetry and the Griffin Poetry Prize. It was also shortlisted for the T. S. Eliot Prize.

== Content ==
The book is divided into five sections: "Quarantine", "Amherst Balladz", "Balladz", "Album from a Previous Existence", and "Elegies". Its poems feature themes such as love, family, and the COVID-19 pandemic, among others. The "Elegies" section, bearing two parts, addresses the deaths of those whom Olds knew.

== Critical reception ==
In a starred review, Library Journal wrote "Ranging from family to mortality to social justice, the Pulitzer Prize–winning Olds (Stag’s Leap) continues her laserlike attentiveness to the life around her life as she crisscrosses childhood, young adulthood, and contemporary times, particularly quarantine."

Some critics observed the vitality of Olds' poetry notwithstanding how long she has written poetry for. The Guardian called the poems "a delicate reckoning" and said that Olds, after "a long writing career," still "proves triumphantly evergreen: a woman who still steps across prudishly conventional lines as playfully as a child absorbed in French skipping." Similarly, Sage Cigarettes said "These are poems in the style and theme that Olds has pioneered and perfected for a lifetime." Dundee University Review of the Arts stated "This book was published in her 80th year and serves as proof that she is still a vital and productive voice. Balladz is also as accessible and engaging as ever."

The Times Literary Supplement called the book "such a profound disappointment" due to its repetition of imagery ("Her mother’s unsettlingly turquoise eyes and requests for back-rubs are both brought up twice in separate poems") and its uninteresting derivation of Emily Dickinson in some parts, among other reasons.
