= Mark Di Ionno =

American journalist

- Born: December 22, 1956 (age 69)
- Education: Rutgers-Newark
- Occupation: Journalist

Mark Di Ionno (born December 22, 1956) is an American journalist and writer.

Di Ionno is a former general news columnist at New Jersey's top newspaper, The Star-Ledger. He is an adjunct professor of journalism at Rutgers University–Newark. He is a 2013 Pulitzer Prize finalist in news commentary for his columns on Hurricane Sandy, the suicide of Tyler Clementi, and other local events and issues. He later worked with TAPinto.

Di Ionno has written extensively about New Jersey in several books that serve as guides to the landscape and history of the state. Two of his books published with Rutgers University Press, New Jersey's Coastal Heritage: A Guide and A Guide to New Jersey's Revolutionary War Trail won the New Jersey Studies Academic Alliance Award.

== Personal ==
Di Ionno was raised in Summit, New Jersey and graduated Summit High School and Rutgers University–Newark. He served in the U.S. Navy. He is father of six and resides in Mountain Lakes, New Jersey.

== Books ==
- New Jersey's Coastal Heritage: A Guide (Rutgers University Press) 1997
- A Guide to New Jersey's Revolutionary War Trail: for Families and History Buffs (Rutgers University Press) 2000
- Backroads, New Jersey: Driving at the Speed of Life (Rutgers University Press) 2002
- The Last Newspaperman (Plexus Publishing) 2012
- Gods of Wood and Stone (Atria Books) 2018
