= Inside Climate News =

American climate journalism website

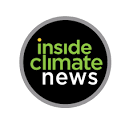
- Founded: 2007
- Founder: David Sassoon and Stacy Feldman
- Type: Online publication
- Legal status: 501(c)(3)
- Purpose: Investigative news regarding climate, energy, and the environment
- Location: Brooklyn, NY
- Region served: United States
- Key people: David Sassoon (founder and publisher); Vernon Loeb (executive editor); Judith Albert (board chair)
- Budget: US$3.3 million (2016)
- Employees: 37
- Website: insideclimatenews.org

Inside Climate News is a non-profit news organization, focusing on environmental journalism about the climate crisis. The publication says it conducts watchdog journalism on climate policy, climate misinformation, and environmental injustice.

Established in 2007, the Brooklyn, New York–based organization won a Pulitzer Prize for national reporting on the Kalamazoo River oil spill in Michigan in 2013. In 2018, Inside Climate News launched the ICN Local initiative to support local environmental journalism in over a dozen states.

== History ==
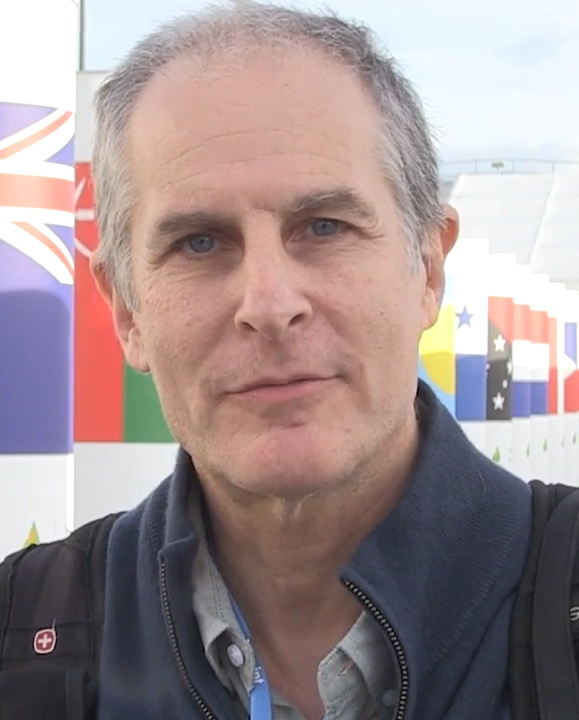
David Sassoon in 2015

The website was co-founded in 2007 by publisher David Sassoon and executive editor Stacy Feldman. Originally called SolveClimate News, it adopted its current name "to counter the perception that it was an environmental advocacy organization." As a non-profit journalism outlet, Inside Climate News's model is similar to that of ProPublica and the Center for Investigative Reporting, which have similarly gained recognition. Like the other two organizations, Inside Climate News publishes its content for free on the Web, collaborates with for-profit news organizations that republish some of the nonprofit's work with credit, and aims "to tackle topics that bigger, better-known news organizations are not equipped or inclined to do."

As of October 2024, Inside Climate News had a staff of 37, including 22 full-time reporters.

== Awards ==
Three Inside Climate News reporters—Elizabeth McGowan, Lisa Song, and David Hasemyer—won the 2013 Pulitzer Prize for National Reporting for their series of "rigorous reports" on the Kalamazoo River oil spill in Michigan, in which an Enbridge oil pipeline spill led to the costliest onshore oil spill in American history. The Pulitzer citation praised the journalists for their coverage of the aftermath of the 2010 to 2012 oil spill and the "flawed regulation of the nation's oil pipelines, focusing on potential ecological dangers posed by diluted bitumen (or 'dilbit'), a controversial form of oil."

In April 2016, Inside Climate News was named a finalist for the Pulitzer Prize for Public Service, for the 2015 Exxon: The Road Not Taken series. Inside Climate News was awarded a 2015 Sigma Delta Chi Award for excellence in journalism by the Society of Professional Journalists for the informational graphics in the Exxon: The Road Not Taken series, which "provide a visual timeline of Exxon's views and efforts on climate change since the 1970s, and evidence of its uncertainty campaigns in the 1990s and 2000s." The White House Correspondents Association awarded Inside Climate News a share in the 2016 Edgar A. Poe Award, which annually honors "excellence in news coverage of subjects and events of significant national or regional importance, written with fairness and objectivity," for the Exxon: The Road Not Taken series.

In 2017, Inside Climate News journalist Marianne Lavelle was recognized with a SEAL Environmental Journalism Award for consistent excellence in investigation and reporting.

== See also ==
- Institute for Nonprofit News (member)
