= David Hasemyer =

American journalist and author

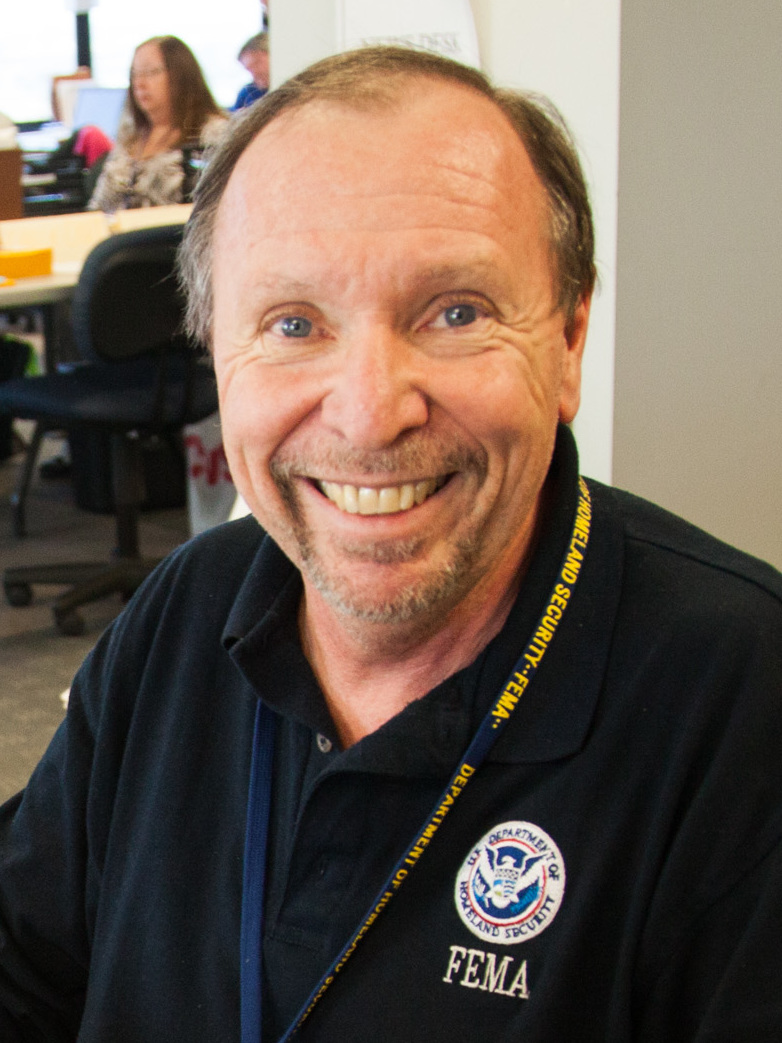
- Hasemyer in 2013
- Education: San Diego City College, San Diego State University
- Occupation: Journalist
- Employer: InsideClimate News
- Awards: Pulitzer Prize

David Hasemyer is an American journalist and author. With Lisa Song and Elizabeth McGowan, he won the 2013 Pulitzer Prize for National Reporting, and a 2016 Robert F. Kennedy Journalism Award. He graduated, in 1979, from San Diego State University, with a Bachelor's in Journalism. Hasemyer was raised in Moab, Utah.

Hasemyer has worked as a reporter for over 4 decades, including 30-years as an investigative reporter with the San Diego Union-Tribune. He's worked as an environmental reporter with InsideClimate News and does freelance reporting.

== Background and education ==
Hasemyer attended San Diego City College, graduating in 1976. He attended San Diego State University, (1976-1979) where he earned his Bachelor's in Journalism.

His first work in journalism was as a writer while attending City College. While a student at San Diego State University, he served as editor of The Daily Aztec, for 2 semesters.

== Career ==
=== 1979-2013 ===
Hasemyer began working for The San Diego Evening Tribune after graduation; he was there for the 1991 merger, when it became The San Diego Union-Tribune. He finished a 30-year career, as an investigative reporter with the Union-Tribune in 2009, losing his position during a massive lay-off.

During his tenure with the Union-Tribune, Hasemyer covered a wide range of topics. In 1984, Hasemyer, flew to Montserrat, in an attempt to track down and interview J. David Dominelli, working on a tip from Nancy Hoover, Dominelli's girlfriend and one-time Del Mar mayor. Hoover told Hasemyer that Dominelli had fled to the Caribbean island, leaving a letter explaining why. Dominelli had cheated investors out of approximately 80 million dollars, in a Ponzi scheme.

Hasemyer spent nearly a week, in an often contentious battle with other reporters, trying to get an interview, promised by Dominelli. However, Hasemyer was turned away the day the interview was scheduled for. In an interview, after learning that Dominelli gave an on-camera interview with another organization, Hasemyer recalled his frustration:

I was at the Vue Pointe when Donley came back and got his cameraman, and this was right after Dominelli told me he wouldn't talk to me. So I called him back and told him I was outraged. You won't talk to me, I told him, "yet you talked to the Times and look what they did to you." [Earlier, Hasemyer had called his office and had both the Times and the Union stories read to him.] I told him, "Listen, I've always been friendly with you. Every time I interviewed you in San Diego and you wanted something kept off the record. I didn't use it," and finally he started vacillating a bit and he told me to call him back. I worked a while and then called him again; this time he said he'd talk, but only with the Union there, too.

Hasemyer continued to cover the events leading up to Dominelli being taken into custody by U.S. Marshals in Miami, after the local authorities refused to allow him to remain on the Island. Later, Dominelli was named as one of the top ten swindlers by Time.

In 1997, Hasemyer and Joe Cantlupe, wrote a series of stories exposing police corruption and the prosecutorial misconduct of the San Diego Deputy District Attorney Keith Burt, and District Attorney Edward Cervantes. The stories led to the reversal of the 1994 convictions of four men; the stories were cited in arguments before the court.

In 2013, after the layoffs at the Union-Tribune, he began working as a reporter, and later, a senior correspondent, at InsideClimate News. Hasemyer also served as an on-call public information officer, (strategy and messaging specialist) with FEMA, and participated in the response to Hurricane Sandy in New York.

=== 2013: Dilbit series ===
During his time with InsideClimate News, he won the 2013 Pulitzer Prize for National Reporting with Lisa Song and Elizabeth McGowan, for their reporting on the Kalamazoo River oil spill.

The 3-part series, and follow up stories, were the result of a 15-month investigation on pipeline safety and dilbit, a controversial form of oil. In the cover letter for entry to the prize, dilbit is described as "a thick Canadian hydrocarbon called bitumen that is diluted with liquid chemicals so that it can flow through pipes". The pipeline already had corrosion problems and it was more than a week before the EPA knew that they were dealing with dilbit, because the pipeline operators weren't required to tell first responders in the event of a spill; dilbit is different from normal oil, in that the chemicals evaporate and the thick, different form of oil, sinks to the bottom and is very difficult to clean up. The series and follow-up reporting is listed below.

- "The Dilbit Disaster: Inside the biggest oil spill you've never heard of, Part 1", Elizabeth McGowan and Lisa Song, InsideClimate News, June 26, 2012.
- "The Dilbit Disaster: Inside the biggest oil spill you've never heard of, Part 2", Elizabeth McGowan and Lisa Song, InsideClimate News, June 27, 2012.
- "The Dilbit Disaster: Inside the biggest oil spill you've never heard of, Part 3", Elizabeth McGowan and Lisa Song, InsideClimate News, June 28, 2012.
- "Epilogue: Cleanup, Consequences and Lives Changed in the Dilbit Disaster", Elizabeth McGowan and Lisa Song, InsideClimate News, June 29, 2012.
- "New Pipeline Safety Regulations Won't Apply to Keystone XL", Elizabeth McGowan and Lisa Song, InsideClimate News, July 26, 2012.
- "Angry Michigan Residents Fight Uneven Battle Against Pipeline Project on Their Land", David Hasemeyer, InsideClimate News, September 12, 2012.
- "Few Oil Pipeline Spills Detected by Much-Touted Technology", Lisa Song, InsideClimate News, September 19, 2012.
- "EPA Worries Dilbit Still a Threat to Kalamazoo River, More than 2 Years After Spill", David Hasemeyer, InsideClimate News, October 11, 2012.
- "Keystone XL Would Not Use Most Advanced Spill Protection Technology", Lisa Song, InsideClimate News, December 20, 2012.
- "Little Oversight for Enbridge Pipeline Route that Skirts Lake Michigan", Lisa Song and David Hasemyer, InsideClimate News, December 27, 2012.

When the 2013 Pulitzer Prize winners were announced, InsideClimate News, was one of the least known of the digital news organizations; Politico's headline described the win in their headline, "For a scrappy environmental-news startup, journalism's most prestigious award." Digital-only prizes had only been awarded since 2009 and very few had won. According to the cover letter, in the entry for the prize, the investigations stemmed from research that Lisa Song had originally began, and McGowan and Hasemyer joined in shortly after.

Additional awards are listed below:

- 2012 Finalist for the Scripps Howard Nation's Best 2012 Journalism Awards, for Environmental Reporting, (with Elizabeth McGowan and Lisa Song) for "Dilbit Disaster: Inside The Biggest Oil Spill You've Never Heard Of", InsideClimate News.
- 2012 Honorable Mention, John B. Oakes Award for Distinguished Environmental Journalism, (with Elizabeth McGowan and Lisa Song) for "Dilbit Disaster: Inside The Biggest Oil Spill You've Never Heard Of".
- 2013 Winner James Aronson Award for Social Justice Reporting, (with Elizabeth McGowan and Lisa Song) for "Dilbit Disaster: Inside The Biggest Oil Spill You've Never Heard Of", InsideClimate News.

=== 2014: Big oil story ===
In 2014 Hasemyer and his colleagues at InsideClimate, Jim Morris and Lisa Song, received the Philip Meyer Journalism Award for Social Science for "Big Oil, Bad Air: Fracking the Eagle Ford Shale of South Texas". They also won the Thomas L. Stokes Award for Best Energy and Environmental Writing, from the National Press Foundation for the same story.

The story exposed how vulnerable, residents are to health risks of the largely unregulated activities around an area known as the Eagle Ford Shale play, a 400-mile-long, 50-mile-wide area of more than 7,000 oil and gas structures, wells, and drilling sites, from Leon County, Texas, in to the Mexican border. Eagle Ford one of the most active drilling sites in America.

Additional awards for the "Big Oil, Bad Air" series and follow up stories are listed below.

- 2014 Editor & Publisher EPPY Award for Best Investigative/Feature on a Website, (with Lisa Song)
- 2015 Association of Health Care Journalists Award for Large Investigation, (with Lisa Song and Jim Morris)
- 2015 Finalist Investigative Reporters & Editors Award for Large Multimedia (with Lisa Song, Susan White, Zahra Hirji, Paul Horn, Lance Rosenfield, Sabrina Shankman, Marcus Stern, John Bolger, and Hannah Robbins) and members of Center for Public Integrity, and The Weather Channel for their collaboration in bringing national attention to the story.
- 2015 Loeb Award for Explanatory Reporting, (staff of InsideClimate News)
- 2015 The Kevin Carmody Award for Outstanding In-depth Reporting (Large Market), from the Society of Environmental Journalists, staff of InsideClimate News, the Center for Public Integrity and the Weather Channel.
- 2016 Knight-Risser Prize for Western Environmental Journalism, staff of InsideClimate News, the Center for Public Integrity and the Weather Channel.

=== 2016: Exxon series ===
In 2016, Hasemyer, and his fellow journalists were finalists for the Pulitzer Prize for Public Service. The series of stories were the result of an 8-month investigation into Exxon's climate change stance.

After conducting dozens of interviews and examining company memos from as far back as the 1970s, and hundreds of internal documents, InsideCimate published a series of 9-stories, "Exxon: The Road Not Taken". The publication of the series, resulted in the Attorney General of New York, issuing a subpoena to Exxon, in order to look into the possibility of fraud. They were also finalists for the Goldsmith Prize for Investigative Reporting.

They received the following awards for the same series:

- (2015) Thomas L. Stokes Award for Best Energy and Environmental Writing
- The Thomas L. Stokes Award for Best Energy Writing
- Co-Winner in the Digital Investigative, Division I, Society of American Business Editors and Writers Award
- Robert F. Kennedy Award, New Media Winner
- John B. Oakes Award
- The Kevin Carmody Award for Outstanding In-depth Reporting, (small market) Society of Environmental Journalists
- The Edgar A. Poe Award, presented to them at the annual White House Correspondents' Association dinner, by President Barack Obama and the First Lady Michelle Obama.
- The Izzy Award for Outstanding Achievement in Independent Media
- The Scripps Howard Edward J. Meeman Award for Outstanding Environmental Journalism. In awarding the prize for their reporting on Exxon, the judges commented on the reporting, saying:

For the past 20 years Exxon has worked to discredit climate science. But, as we learn from InsideClimate News' compelling series, the company had evidence suggesting the opposite was true. From its own scientists. For years.

The ExxonMobil climate change controversy is still ongoing. As of 2020, ExxonMobil still denies any wrongdoing in voicing their opinion on climate policy, claiming that activist organizations are seeking to punish the company, and coordinating an attack campaign on social media, using the hashtag #ExxonKnew.

An ExxonMobil website disputes the reporting, citing several law experts, news reports, and opinion columns, including New York Post, The Wall Street Journal, New York Daily News, The Dallas Morning News, Bloomberg View, USA Today, and Boston Herald. Exxon also has its own timeline of events on their website.

The series of reports by the staff of ClimateChange News, including the documents they used, are listed below.

- Exxon's Own Research Confirmed Fossil Fuels' Role in Global warming Decades Ago
- Exxon Believed Deep Dive Into Climate Research Would Protect Its Business
- Exxon Confirmed Global Warming Consensus in 1982 with In-House Climate Models
- Exxon's Business Ambition Collided with Climate Change Under a Distant Sea
- Highlighting the Allure of Synfuels, Exxon Played Down the Climate Risks
- Exxon Sowed Doubt About Climate Science for Decades by Stressing Uncertainty
- Exxon Made Deep Cuts in Climate Research Budget in the 1980s
- More Exxon Documents Show How Much it Knew About Climate 35 Years Ago
- Exxon's Oil Industry Peers Knew About Climate Dangers in the 1970s Too
- Internal Documents published by InsideClimate News

== Bibliography ==
- Big Oil + Bad Air: Fracking's Toxic Footprint, Song, Hasemyer, Morris, Mann, Horn, InsideClimate News, March 26, 2014.
- Exxon: The Road Not Taken, Banerjee, Cushman Jr., Hasemyer and Song, InsideClimate News, 2015.
- The Dilbit Disaster: Inside The Biggest Oil Spill You've Never Heard Of, McGowan, Song and Hasemyer, CreateSpace Independent Publishing Platform, October 19, 2016.
- Choke Hold: The Fossil Fuel Industry's Fight Against Climate Policy, Science and Clean Energy, Banerjee, Hasemyer, Lavelle, McClure, Wieners and Holt, CreateSpace Independent Publishing Platform, 2018.
