= Manu Brabo =

Spanish photojournalist (born 1981)

Manuel Brabo
- Born: Manuel Varela de Seijas Bravo ca. 1981; Zaragoza, Spain
- Disappeared: April 5, 2011; Libyan desert near Brega
- Status: Detained in Tripoli, released May 18, 2011
- Education: School of Arts and Crafts, Oviedo; Charles III University, Madrid
- Occupation: Photojournalist
- Employer: Freelance
- Known for: Photojournalism in conflict areas
- Awards: Pulitzer Prize in Breaking News Photography in 2013
- Website: manubrabo.22slides.com

Manu Brabo (born c. 1981) is a Spanish photojournalist who was captured in Libya along with three other journalists while covering the Libyan Civil War in 2011 and who was part of the Associated Press team to win the Pulitzer Prize for Breaking News Photography in 2013.

== Personal ==
Manuel Varela de Seijas Bravo was born in Zaragoza, Spain around 1981 and lived in Gijón, Spain. He studied photography at the School of Arts and Crafts in Oviedo and journalism at Charles III University in Madrid.

== Career ==
After completing his education, Brabo worked at some Spanish newspapers and news agencies. He covered the Libyan Civil War in 2011, the Syrian Civil War, the Russo-Ukrainian war and the war in Iraq as other conflicts. He has worked as a freelance photojournalist for the Associated Press (AP) and the European Pressphoto Agency, and his work has been published in newspapers and magazines. He is co-founder with Spanish photographers Guillem Valle, José Colón and Diego Ibarra as well as the Italian Fabio Bucciarelli, of MEMO, a cooperative of photojournalists created in 2014 in Torino, Italy.

== Disappearance ==
Places where Brabo and the other journalists traveled to in Libya relative to the capital Tripoli.

On 5 April 2011, Brabo along with journalists James Foley, Clare Morgana Gillis and Anton Hammerl were reportedly detained by pro-Gaddafi soldiers in the Libyan Desert near Brega. As they were traveling with an unorganized militia they witnessed a military truck approaching them. It was then that one of the journalists, later identified as Hammerl, was shot from the military truck. Brabo was one of the 16 journalists detained in Tripoli. While being held in Tripoli, they received a visit from a Spanish diplomat who reported that Brabo along with others were being held humanely and were treated well. He and the other journalists were found guilty in a Libyan court for entering without a proper visa and their sentences suspended. Brabo and the others were released on 18 May 2011.

== Pulitzer Prize (2013) ==
Brabo took a photograph on 3 October 2012 during the aftermath of a car bombing in Aleppo, Syria. This photograph was part of a series of Associated Press breaking news photographs awarded the Pulitzer Prize for Breaking News Photography in 2013.

Brabo shared the prize with AP photographers Rodrigo Abd, Narciso Contreras, Khalil Hamra and Muhammed Muheisen.

== Awards ==
- 2006: Premio Autor Joven (Translated: Young Authors Award) for "Caminos de hierro"
- 2009: Premio Nómadas Periscopio (Translated: Nomads Periscope Award) at the Festival of Photojournalism in Vitoria
- 2011: The Atlanta Photojournalism Seminar: Chris Hondros Memorial International News Award, 1st place, General News
- 2012: Alliance of Mediterranean News Agencies Awards, Best Photo 2011-2012
- 2012: The Atlanta Photojournalism Seminar: Chris Hondros Memorial International News Award, 1st place, General News
- 2012: National Headliner Awards, 1st place & Best In Show
- 2012: Prix Bayeux-Calvados for War Correspondents, Audience Award
- 2013: China International Press Photo, Silver prize, War and Disaster News Stories
- 2013: Overseas Press Club of America, Honorable Mention, Robert Capa Gold Medal
- 2013: Pulitzer Prize for Breaking News Photography, along with Rodrigo Abd, Narciso Contreras, Khalil Hamra, and Muhammed Muheisen
- 2013: Pictures of the Year International, 1st place, Spot News
- 2014: Giornalisti del Mediterraneo, Italy
- 2015: British Journalism Awards, Photojournalism
- 2016: Pictures of the Year International, 2nd, News Picture Story
- 2016: Press Awards, UK. "Photographer of the year 2015"
