= John Branch (journalist) =

American journalist and writer

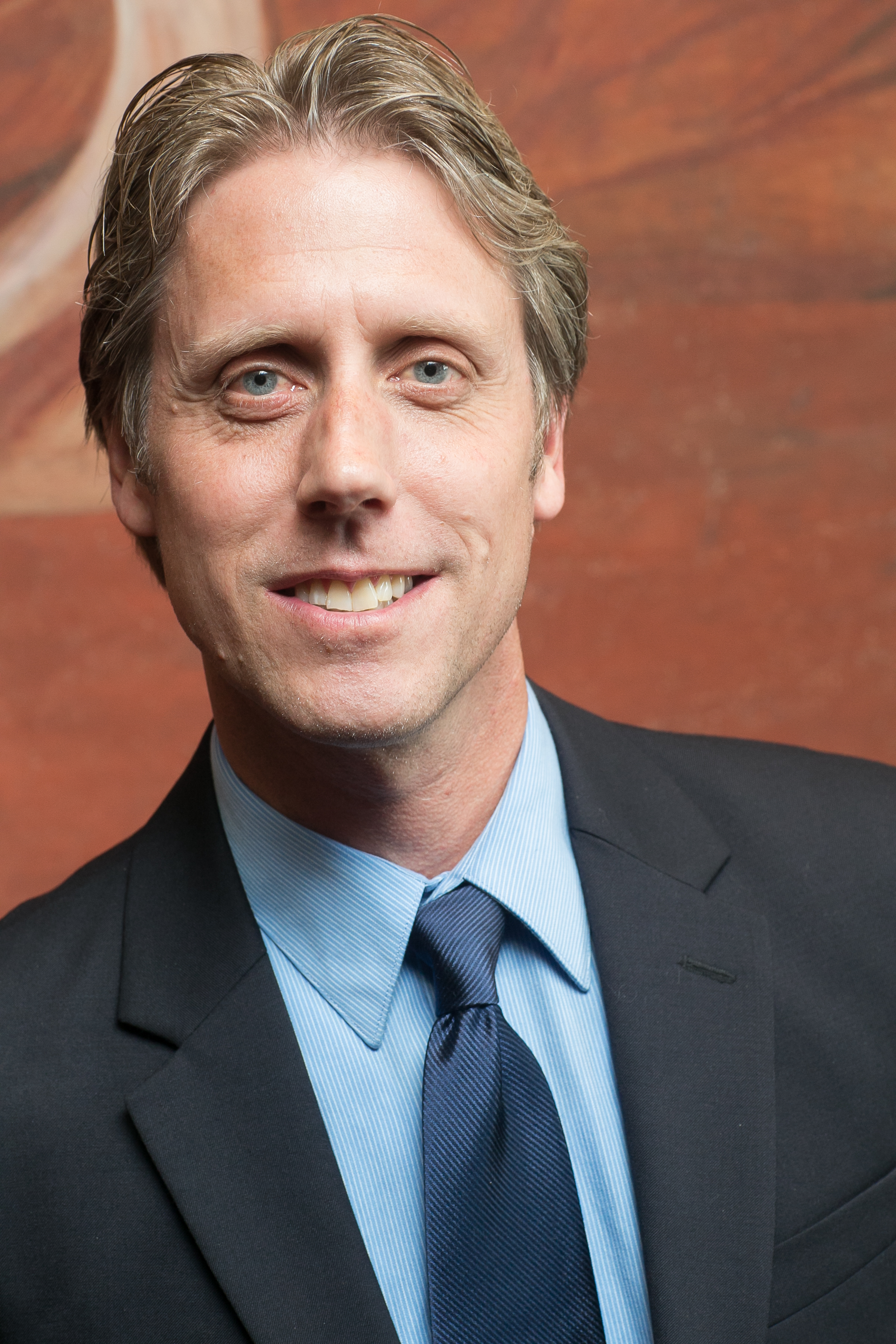
- Born: June 25, 1967 (age 59); Redondo Beach, California, U.S.
- Education: University of Colorado Boulder (BS, MA)
- Notable work: "Snow Fall"
- Awards: Pulitzer Prize for Feature Writing (2013)

John Branch (born June 25, 1967) is an American journalist and writer who currently works at the New York Times, covering topics related to sports and California.

== Early life and education ==
Branch was born on June 25, 1967, in Redondo Beach, California and raised in Colorado. He earned a Bachelor of Science degree in Business and Master of Arts degree in journalism, both from the University of Colorado Boulder.

== Career ==
After graduating from college, Branch worked for The Gazette in Colorado Springs as a business reporter from 1996 to 1998, and a sports reporter from 1998 to 2002. He then worked as a sports columnist for The Fresno Bee from 2002 to 2005.

He first joined The New York Times in 2005. Branch won the 2013 Pulitzer Prize in Feature Writing for "Snow Fall: The Avalanche at Tunnel Creek," a multimedia narrative on a deadly avalanche at Stevens Pass, and was a finalist in the 2011 Pulitzer Prize for his series titled "Punched Out" about the death of ice hockey player Derek Boogaard.

He authored a biography about Boogaard titled Boy on Ice: The Life and Death of Derek Boogaard which was released in 2014. It won the 2015 PEN/ESPN Award for Literary Sports Writing.

Branch wrote the book, The Last Cowboys: A Pioneer Family in the New West, which was released in 2018. The book centres on the Wright family from Utah, sixth generation ranchers who are also some of the world's best saddle bronc riders. The book came out of a 2015 New York Times article by Branch called The Ride of Their Lives.

A collection of Branch's articles and personal essays is to be published in 2021 called Sidecountry: Tales of Death and Life from the Back Roads of Sports. This collection will include the 2013 Pulitzer Prize winning feature "Snow Fall: The Avalanche at Tunnel Creek,".

== Personal life ==
Branch is based in Novato, California.
