= Ali Hassan al-Jaber =

Qatari journalist (1955–2011)

- Born: 12 December 1955; Doha, Qatar
- Died: 12 March 2011 (aged 55); Suluq, Libya
- Education: M.A. Cinematography, Academy of Arts, Egypt
- Occupation: Journalist
- Years active: Over 20 years

Ali Hassan al-Jaber (Arabic: علي حسن الجابر, romanized: ‘Alī Ḥassan al-Jābir; 12 December 1955 – 12 March 2011) was a Qatari national working as a camera operator for the TV channel Al Jazeera.

He was the first foreign journalist killed during the First Libyan Civil War. Three other foreign photojournalists were killed in Libya while covering the war. Tim Hetherington and Chris Hondros were killed in Misrata. Anton Hammerl was killed outside of Brega.

== Personal information ==
He was born in the capital city of Doha. He studied cinematography at the Academy of Arts in Cairo, Egypt. In addition, he attended Qatar University where he graduated with a B.A. in 1982. At the time of his death, he was married and had three children.

== Career ==
He started his career working for Qatar TV in Doha as head of the filming department from 1979 to 2001. He also worked as photography supervisor at the Qatar Olympic Committee from 2001 to 2005 and was installed as director of CNBC Arabiya's Qatar bureau in 2005. He was eventually employed by local news outlet Al Jazeera.

== Death ==
Al-Jaber and two other photographers, Ashraf Ibrahim and Mansur Ibi, were sent abroad to cover the uprisings in Benghazi during the 2011 Libyan civil war. After landing in the Egyptian city of Arish, they traveled to Libya. On March 12, they learned that a pro-revolution rally was going to be held in Suluq, a village near Benghazi. Al-Jaber accompanied field reporter Beiba Ould M’hadi to the rally and he was shot while returning to Benghazi after filing a report. His colleague, Naser al-Hadar, was also shot. Al-Jaber was sent to a hospital but did not survive.

== Reaction ==
Wadah Khanfar, the director-general of Al Jazeera, said that the killing followed "an unprecedented campaign" against Al Jazeera by Muammar Gaddafi.

Thousands of people in Benghazi demonstrated in support of the journalist when the event was known.

On 13 March, the day after, Amnesty International condemned the killing, while Reporters Without Borders said they were outraged.

== See also ==
- List of photojournalists
- Tareq Ayyoub
