= Stag's Leap (book) =

2012 poetry book by Sharon Olds

- Author: Sharon Olds
- Language: English
- Genre: Contemporary poetry
- Publication date: 2012
- Publication place: United States
- Pages: 112
- ISBN: 0375712259

Stag's Leap is a book of poetry written by Sharon Olds and published in 2012. It follows the events leading up to and following the poet's divorce, after a thirty-year marriage. The book won the T. S. Eliot Prize in 2012, and the Pulitzer Prize for Poetry in 2013.

== Content ==
After her divorce in 1997, Olds started writing a series of poems relating the different phases of grief and denial. There are reminders of love and romance, and the constant battle between her mind and heart results in her questioning herself. The poems trace the last year of the marriage, and then the year after.

The collection contains 49 poems. The first poem, "While He Told Me", expressed the pain she felt when she realized her marriage is over, expressed as a kind of death: she refers to her marriage as her "body". Critics have noted the "generosity" toward the husband expressed in the collection; the book's title was inspired by Stags' Leap Winery, makers of the couple's favorite wine, and Olds compares her husband favorably to the wine and its logo, "a badly-drawn stag leaping off a cliff" (in Kate Kellaway's words):

When anyone escapes, my heart
leaps up. Even when it's I who am
escaped from,
I am half on the side of the leaver.

Nick Clark, for The Independent, framed the "confessional" collection differently: "If revenge is a dish best served cold, Sharon Olds must have been licking her lips last night. Fifteen years after her husband ran off with another woman, the poet scooped the UK’s most prestigious poetry prize for a collection that explored the experience in detail". He says Olds had promised their children she would not "publish anything for at least a decade".

== Critical reception ==
Tess Taylor, reviewing the book for NPR's All Things Considered, praises the "furious detail" of the very personal account, and wrote she was "haunted" by "the way it captures the strangeness of enduring loss over time — the way it makes a sort of prolonged sculpture out of the oddness of parting....Olds tallies the scale of this human mystery in household objects, hips and shoulders, the forms of a common life. And at her best, the Olds who so fiercely details her specific suffering becomes someone we all recognize, an almost universal figure who is a supplicant before the gods of love". Taylor offered two specific critiques as well—she did not enjoy the "riff" on the winery's name, which "captured the husband as a stag leaping away", and she found the comparison between the loss she suffered and the loss suffered by family members of the World Trade Center attack in poor taste.

Michael Andor Brodeur, in The Boston Globe, also notes Olds's generosity, and the sharp "emotional acumen in her lines"; he called it "a refreshingly worthwhile (and often engrossing) collection" which demonstrates how the "self" can survive loss.

== Awards ==
In awarding the 2012 T. S. Eliot Prize, Carol Ann Duffy, British Poet Laureate from 2009 to 2019, noted the judges' decision was unanimous, and that the collection was "tremendous book of grace and gallantry, which crowns the career of a world-class poet".

Stag's Leap also won the 2013 Pulitzer Prize for Poetry, as "a book of unflinching poems on the author's divorce that examine love, sorrow and the limits of self-knowledge". The jury comprised Carl Phillips, C.D. Wright, and Maurice Manning.
