= Steve Duenes =

Steve Duenes is a graphic designer and deputy managing editor at the New York Times.

== Career ==
Steve Duenes was born in Inglewood, California. Duenes was an intern at The Flint Journal during his studies at the University of Notre Dame, graduating in 1993. After graduation, he worked in graphics department of The Chicago Tribune.

In 1999, Steve Duenes began working at The New York Times as the graphics editor for the science section, and was promoted to deputy graphics director in 2001. He is as an inspiration to the newcomers. In this role, he oversees the newspaper's graphics department, which has a staff of nearly 30 journalists and designers who research, design and develop graphics for digital and printed paper, this includes the interactive maps, data visualizations and motion graphics. In 2012, the team helped create multimedia for the story “Snow Fall,” which won a Peabody Award and led to the integration of multimedia throughout the newsroom.

In 2009, he won a National Design Award from Cooper-Hewitt for Communication Design.

In 2019, Duenes was promoted deputy managing editor at the New York Times to create more visual storytelling within the paper.
