= Anton Hammerl =

South African photojournalist (1969-2011)

- Born: Anton Lazarus Hammerl; 12 December 1969; Johannesburg, South Africa
- Died: 5 April 2011 (aged 41); Outside of Brega, Libya
- Cause of death: Gunshot wounds
- Education: Pretoria Technikon
- Occupation: Photojournalist
- Years active: 1992–2011
- Spouse: Penny Sukhraj
- Children: 3
- Website: Official website

Anton Hammerl (12 December 1969 – 5 April 2011) was a South African photojournalist who was shot and killed by troops loyal to Muammar Gaddafi outside of Brega while covering the First Libyan Civil War on 5 April 2011. After his death, Hammerl's family was led to believe by the Gaddafi regime that he was alive and safe, but held in detention in Libya. His family learned about his death on 19 May after the release of a group of journalists who had been with Hammerl when he was killed.

Hammerl was one of five journalists killed during the civil war. His remains have not yet been located.

== Personal background ==
Anton Lazarus Hammerl was born in Johannesburg, South Africa on 12 December 1969 to Ludwig and Freda Hammerl.

Hammerl attended King Edward VII Primary and Roosevelt High School. When his photographic studies ended in the early 1990s, he began his career in photojournalism. Hammerl also served in Angola with the South African Defence Force. After completing national service, he enrolled at Pretoria Technikon to study photography.

In 2003, Hammerl married Penny Sukhraj. They had two children. Hammerl was also a father to a daughter from a previous relationship. Hammerl was a dual citizen of Austria and South Africa.

== Professional background ==
In 1992, Hammerl began working as a freelance photojournalist for The Star, where he met colleague and mentor, Ken Oosterbroek. A South African, Oosterbroek was a member of the Bang-Bang Club. After working with The Star, Hammerl began to freelance for Associated Press, covering South Africa democratisation and the end of apartheid.

In 1995, Hammerl, while continuing his work with The Star, began working as a senior photographer for independent South African newspapers the Saturday Star and the Sunday Independent. In 2001, he became the picture editor and chief photographer at the Saturday Star. From 2006 until his death in 2011, Hammerl went back to being a freelance photojournalist in London.

== Death ==
Places mentioned inside Libya relative to the capital Tripoli.

According to media reports, on the morning of 5 April 2011, three other reporters beside Hammerl were attacked by Libyan soldiers who shot at them in a remote desert location outside of Brega. These included two Americans: James Foley, a freelance reporter and regular contributor to the Global Post, and Clare Morgana Gillis, a freelance reporter (Atlantic Monthly, The Christian Science Monitor, USA Today), as well as Spanish photographer Manu Brabo. When the shooting started, Foley and Gillis both heard Hammerl yell out, "Help!" Hammerl was killed and the other three journalists were beaten by the pro-Gaddafi forces and then taken as their prisoners.

Foley stated: "Once I saw Anton lying there dead, it was like everything had changed. The whole world has changed. I don't even know that I felt some of the blows." Gillis said, "We all glanced down at him as we were being taken by, and I saw him just lying in a pool of blood. And then we were put into the truck and our heads were pushed down. We weren't able to see anything that happened after that to him." After the attack in which Hammerl was killed, Libyan authorities gave Hammerl's family false information for some 45 days that Hammerl was still alive.

=== Timeline of events ===
Before Hammerl began his journey, two journalists had already been killed while covering the Libyan civil war. Both Ali Hassan al-Jaber and Mohammed Nabbous had been killed in Benghazi during the month of March. In the meantime, the front, although fluid, had moved westward. He flew from London to Libya on 28 March to cover the uprising against Colonel Muammar Gaddafi's regime. According to his family, Hammerl last talked to them 4 April and told them he would drive with a group of journalists to a rural location some distance from their Benghazi base.

A day later, Hammerl was killed in the desert outside of Brega. The reporters were headed toward the front lines of battle when they walked into a fight between rebels and Gaddafi forces; the latter shot Hammerl and captured the others. Hammerl's body was left behind in the desert. At the time, eyewitness reports were printed that said the car in which Hammerl and the journalists had been riding was destroyed after its occupants were removed, but no death was reported.

Hammerl's family was notified that he was missing and they asked South Africa to aid them in gaining his release. On 7 April, Human Rights Watch contacted Hammerl's wife, stating they believed Hammerl was captured, along with two American journalists and a Spanish photographer, by Gaddafi loyalists. Hammerl's wife contacted the South African consular officials in London and, since South Africa no longer had a diplomatic staff in Tripoli embassy, it passed the information on to officials in South Africa.

On 8 April, Human Rights Watch informed Hammerl's family that Libyan authorities confirmed that it had captured four journalists, including Hammerl, the two Americans and a Spaniard. The human rights organisation said the Libyan authorities had said the journalists would be taken to Tripoli and released. The same day, a senior consul official in South Africa said staff from the Turkish embassy would facilitate negotiations for a release as they were acting on behalf of the US government. On 9 April, the South African consular official informed the family that South African President Jacob Zuma intended to visit Libya and would raise the matter of Hammerl's detention with the Libyan government. The suggestion was that a release would probably happen as a show of goodwill by Gaddafi. However, the next day, Hammerl's family was informed that the issue of his release had not been raised by President Zuma's delegation. Zuma was criticised for not raising the issue. By 14 April, the South African government was working with the US, Spanish and Austrian governments to secure his release, as well as that of the other journalists.

On 20 April, two photojournalists, Tim Hetherington and Chris Hondros were reported killed in Misrata. South African journalists and photographers demonstrated outside Houses of Parliament in Cape Town, South Africa, and demanded government action over Hammerl's imprisonment. On 21 April, South African journalists and photographers demonstrated in Hyde Park, Johannesburg, to draw attention to the plight of Hammerl.

Each of the other three captured reporters emerged, but not Hammerl. Each of the three had been allowed a call to their families by Saturday, 23 April, but Hammerl's family had yet to hear from him. Gillis, initially thought to have been captured with Hammerl, called her parents from detention in Libya, but it was reported in the media on 21 April that Gillis had said Hammerl had not been with her and two other journalists, Foley and Brabo, when they were captured.

Hammerl was still believed to be alive. According to a story on 22 April by the Global Post, which is the Boston-based news website for which Foley worked, a Libyan official claimed Hammerl was alive and well. A South African foreign affairs official confirmed this. By 16 April, the Austrian Foreign Ministry said two independent sources had confirmed that Hammerl was alive and well. The confirmation was obtained from a network of contacts in Libya.

On 28 April, the United Nations dispatched a three-man task force to Libya to investigate allegations that forces loyal to Gaddafi had committed human rights violations, including the detention of foreign journalists. Supporters rallied people to call for Hammerl's return. By 30 April, an online petition calling for the release of South African photographer Hammerl and the three other detained journalists had received over 32,000 signatures.

On World Press Freedom Day, which is on 3 May, vigils were held for Hammerl at St Bride's Church, Fleet Street, London, and at the Institute for the Advancement of Journalism in Johannesburg. On 14 May, the Hammerl family launched a "Yellow Ribbons of Hope for Anton" campaign to mark 40 days and 40 nights since Hammerl last had contact with the outside world. To mark this day, they called on people around the world to wear a yellow ribbon, which has long been used to signify the absence of a loved one.

On 17 May, the Libyan government claimed it would release Hammerl. On 18 May, Foley, Gillis and Brabo, as well as Nigel Chandler (an English journalist also being held), were released and brought to the Rixos Hotel in Tripoli. Hammerl's family and friends watched this unfold live on television.

With the release of the journalists, the family learned of Hammerl's death and the Gaddafi government's attempt to cover it up. At 22:00 BST, Thursday, 19 May, Penny Sukhraj received a telephone call from the South African authorities and they told her that her husband was now believed to be dead, shot in the desert by pro-Gaddafi forces. Later that evening, Sukhraj spoke to Gillis and Foley, who shared their eyewitness accounts of events on the last day they had seen Hammerl alive, and his death. During their time in detention, they said they had to keep Hammerl's death a secret and were fearful that talking about his situation could endanger their lives and jeopardise their chances of freedom. Before learning of his death, the Hammerl family were getting ready to begin a physical search for Hammerl by sending South African journalist and friend Des Latham to Libya.

By 26 May, well before President Zuma made another trip to Libya, the Hammerl family called on Zuma to use his influence with the Gaddafi regime to help locate Hammerl's remains and bring him home to South Africa. On 2 July, more than 400 friends, family and colleagues gathered at His People Church, Johannesburg, to reflect on Hammerl's life.

On 8 September, Hammerl's friends, family and colleagues returned to St Bride's Church, Fleet Street, for his London memorial service. The family continues its efforts to locate Hammerl's remains. On 1 November, Sukhraj wrote an open letter to the Libyan people: "Dear people of Libya we call on you to please be our hearts, eyes and ears in our search for the whereabouts of Anton's remains."

== Public reaction ==
The South African Department of International Relations and Cooperation reopened its mission in Libya, focusing on locating Hammerl. The South African government began to work with Austria, trying to recover the body for a proper burial, which required a diplomatic effort involving both sides of the Libyan conflict.

On 6 December 2011, a shadow minister of International Relations and Cooperation, charged that the South African government had not revealed the measures it had taken during Hammerl's disappearance or how it had verified his status. The Department of International Relations and Cooperations said the situation was made difficult by the war. Penny Sukhraj formed a nonprofit organisation, so they could spread the word about his disappearance.

The president of the International Federation of Journalists said, "The devastating news of his killing has been made unbearable by the Libyan cover up of his death. We offer our sincere condolences to his wife Penny Sukhraj." Mixael de Kock, deputy chairman of the Johannesburg Press Club, emphasised that journalists must be protected in areas of war and conflict, if they continue to document the process of combat and expose violations of international law as the journalists who covered the Libyan civil war had done.

== Honors and awards ==
- 1997: World Press Photo's Joop Swart Masterclass
- 1997: Abdul Shariff Humanitarian Photographer of the Year Award
- 1999: Abdul Shariff Humanitarian Photographer of the Year Award
- 2005: Mondi Shanduka Photographer of the Year
- 2006: Fuji Africa News Image of the Year
- 2011: Nat Nakasa Award

== See also ==
- List of photojournalists
