= Sharon Olds =

American poet

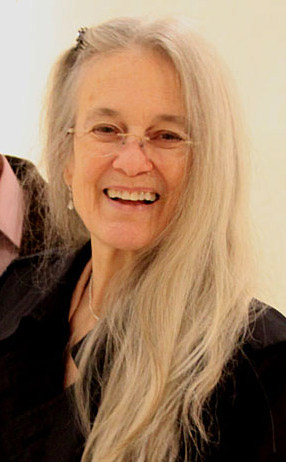
- Olds in 2015
- Born: November 19, 1942 (age 83); San Francisco, California, U.S.
- Education: Stanford University (BA); Columbia University (MA, PhD)
- Occupation: Poet
- Spouse: David Douglas Olds (m. 1969–1997)
- Partner: Carl Wallman
- Children: 2, including Gabriel Olds
- Awards: Pulitzer Prize in Poetry, T. S. Eliot Prize, National Book Critics Circle Award
- Website: sharonolds.net

Sharon Olds (born November 19, 1942) is an American poet. She won the first San Francisco State University Poetry Center Award in 1980, the 1984 National Book Critics Circle Award, and the 2013 Pulitzer Prize for Poetry. She teaches creative writing at New York University and is a previous director of the Creative Writing Program at NYU.

== Early life ==
Sharon Olds was born, as Sharon Stuart Cobb, on November 19, 1942, in San Francisco, California, but was brought up in Berkeley, California, along with her siblings. She was raised as a "hellfire Calvinist," as she describes it. Her father, like his before him, was an alcoholic who was often abusive to his children. In Olds' writing she often refers to the time (or possibly even times) when her father tied her to a chair. Olds' mother was often either unable or too afraid to come to the aid of her children.

The strict religious environment in which Olds was raised had certain rules of censorship and restriction. Olds was not permitted to go to the movies and the family did not own a television, but her reading was not censored. She liked fairy tales, and also read Nancy Drew and Life magazine. By nature "a pagan and a pantheist," she has said that in childhood she was exposed in her church to "both great literary art and bad literary art," with "the great art being psalms and the bad art being hymns. The four-beat was something that was just part of my consciousness from before I was born." Of her Calvinist childhood, she said in 2011 that though she was about 15 when she conceived of herself as an atheist, "I think it was only very recently that I can really tell that there's nobody there with a copybook making marks against your name."

Olds was sent east to Dana Hall School, an all-girls school for grades 6 to 12 in Wellesley, Massachusetts, that boasts an impressive list of alumnae. There she studied mostly English, History, and Creative Writing. Her favorite poets included William Shakespeare, Emily Dickinson, Walt Whitman, and Edna St. Vincent Millay, but it was Allen Ginsberg's Howl and Other Poems that she carried in her purse through 10th grade.

For her bachelor's degree Olds returned to California where she earned her BA at Stanford University in 1964. Following this, Olds once again moved cross country to New York, where she earned her Ph.D. in English in 1972 from Columbia University. She teaches creative writing at New York University. She wrote her doctoral dissertation on "Emerson's Prosody," because she appreciated the way he defied convention.

== Personal life ==
I want to go up to them and say Stop,
don’t do it—she’s the wrong woman,
he’s the wrong man, you are going to do things
you cannot imagine you would ever do,
you are going to do bad things to children,
you are going to suffer in ways you have not heard of,
you are going to want to die. I want to go
up to them there in the late May sunlight and say it,
her hungry pretty face turning to me,
her pitiful beautiful untouched body,
his arrogant handsome face turning to me,
his pitiful beautiful untouched body,
but I don’t do it. I want to live.

— From "I Go Back to May 1937"
Strike Sparks: Selected Poems 1980–2002 (2004)

On March 23, 1968, she married Dr. David Douglas Olds in New York City and, in 1969, gave birth to the first of their two children. Their second child, born in 1972, is actor and screenwriter Gabriel Olds. In 1997, after 29 years of marriage, they divorced. She lives in the same Upper West Side apartment she has lived in for many years while working as a professor at New York University. In a review of her 2022 collection Balladz, Tristram Fane Saunders mentions the moving poems she wrote about her longtime partner, the late Carl Wallman of New Hampshire, who died in 2020.

In 2005, First Lady Laura Bush invited Olds to the National Book Festival in Washington, D.C. Olds declined the invitation and responded with an open letter published in The Nation. The editors suggested others follow her example. She concluded her letter by explaining: "So many Americans who had felt pride in our country now feel anguish and shame for the current regime of blood, wounds and fire. I thought of the clean linens at your table, the shining knives and the flames of the candles, and I could not stomach it."

== Poetry ==
Following her Ph.D., Olds let go of an attachment to what she thought she knew about poetic convention and began to write about her family, abuse, and sex, focusing on the work and not the audience.

Olds has said that she is more informed by the work of poets such as Galway Kinnell, Muriel Rukeyser and Gwendolyn Brooks than by confessional poets like Anne Sexton or Sylvia Plath. Plath, she comments "was a great genius, with an IQ of at least double mine" and while these women charted well the way of women in the world she says "their steps were not steps I wanted to put my feet in."

When Olds first sent her poetry to a literary magazine she received a reply saying, "This is a literary magazine. If you wish to write about this sort of subject, may we suggest the Ladies' Home Journal. The true subjects of poetry are … male subjects, not your children."

Olds eventually published her first collection, Satan Says, in 1980, at the age of 37. Satan Says sets up the sexual and bodily candour that would run through much of her work. In "The Sisters of Sexual Treasure" she writes, "As soon as my sister and I got out of our/ mother's house, all we wanted to/do was fuck, obliterate/her tiny sparrow body and narrow/grasshopper legs."

The collection is divided into four sections: "Daughter," "Woman," "Mother," "Journeys." These titles echo the familial influence that is prevalent in much of Olds' work.

The Dead and the Living was published in February 1984. This collection is divided into two sections: "Poems for the Dead" and "Poems for the Living." The first section begins with poems about global injustices. These injustices include the Armenian genocide during WWI, the 1921 Tulsa race massacre, the reign of Mohammad Reza Shah Pahlavi, and even the death of Marilyn Monroe.

Olds' book The Wellspring (1996), shares with her previous work the use of raw language and startling images to convey truths about domestic and political violence and family relationships. In a New York Times review, Lucy McDiarmid hailed her poetry for its vision: "like Whitman, Ms. Olds sings the body in celebration of a power stronger than political oppression." Alicia Ostriker noted Olds traces the "erotics of family love and pain." Ostriker continues: "In later collections, [Olds] writes of an abusive childhood, in which miserably married parents bully and punish and silence her. She writes, too, of her mother's apology "after 37 years," a moment when "The sky seemed to be splintering, like a window/someone is bursting into or out of." Olds' work is anthologized in over 100 collections, ranging from literary/poetry textbooks to special collections. Her poetry has been translated into seven languages for international publications. She has been published in Beloit Poetry Journal. She was the New York State Poet Laureate for 1998–2000.

Stag's Leap was published in 2013. The poems were written in 1997, following the divorce from her husband of 29 years. The poems focus on her husband, and even sometimes his mistress. The collection won the T. S. Eliot Prize. She is the first American woman to win this award. It also won the Pulitzer Prize for Poetry.

== Women's Movement ==
Olds did not participate in the Women's Movement at first, but she says, "My first child was born in 1969. In 1968 the Women's Movement in New York City—especially among a lot of women I knew—was very alive. I had these strong ambitions to enter the bourgeoisie if I could. I wasn't a radical at all. But I do remember understanding that I had never questioned that men had all the important jobs. And that was shocking—well, I was 20 years old! I'd never thought, "Oh, where's the woman bus driver?" So there's another subject—which was what it felt like to be a woman in the world."

== Honors and awards ==
- 1978 Creative Artists Public Service Grant
- 1978 Madeline Sadin Award, New York Quarterly
- 1979 Younger Poets Award, Poetry Miscellany
- 1980 Satan Says inaugural San Francisco Poetry Center Award.
- 1981–1982 Guggenheim Fellowship, John Simon Guggenheim Memorial Foundation
- 1982–1983 National Endowment for the Arts Fellowship
- 1983 The Dead and the Living Lamont Poetry Prize, and the National Book Critics Circle Award.
- 1992 The Father, shortlisted for the T. S. Eliot Prize and was a finalist for the National Book Critics Circle Award.
- 1993–1996 Lila Wallace-Reader's Digest Writers Award
- 1998–2000 New York State Poet Laureate
- 2002 Academy of American Poets Fellowship
- 2002 The Unswept Room, Finalist for the National Book Award for Poetry
- 2003 Judge, Griffin Poetry Prize; for "distinguished poetic achievement at mid-career"
- 2004 Barnes & Noble Writers for Writers Awards
- 2004 Became member of the American Academy of Arts and Sciences
- 2006–2012 Chancellor of the Academy of American Poets
- 2009 One Secret Thing, shortlisted for the T. S. Eliot Prize and the Forward Prizes for Poetry
- 2012 T. S. Eliot Prize, Stag's Leap
- 2012 Stag's Leap, named as one of "Oprah's Favorite Reads of 2012"
- 2013 Pulitzer Prize, Stag's Leap
- 2014 Donald Hall-Jane Kenyon Prize in American Poetry
- 2015 Elected to become a member of the American Academy of Arts and Letters (to be inducted mid-May 2015)
- 2016 Wallace Stevens Award from the Academy of American Poets
- 2020 Shortlisted for the Griffin Poetry Prize, Arias
- 2022 Poetry Society of America's Robert Frost Medal awardee
- 2023 Awarded the inaugural Joan Margarit International Poetry Prize

== Bibliography ==
=== Collections ===
- 1980 Satan Says, University of Pittsburgh Press ISBN 978-0822953142
- 1984 The Dead and the Living, Knopf ISBN 978-0394715636
- 1987 The Gold Cell, Knopf ISBN 978-0394747705
- 1987 The Matter of This World, Slow Dancer Press ISBN 978-0950747989
- 1991 The Sign of Saturn, Secker & Warburg ISBN 978-0436200298
- 1992 The Father, Secker & Warburg ISBN 978-0679740025
- 1996 The Wellspring, Knopf ISBN 978-0679765608
- 1999 Blood, Tin, Straw, Knopf ISBN 978-0375707353
- 2002 The Unswept Room, Tandem Library ISBN 978-0375709982
- 2004 Strike Sparks: Selected Poems 1980–2002, Knopf ISBN 978-0375710766
- 2008 One Secret Thing, Random House ISBN 978-0375711770
- 2012 Stag's Leap, Knopf ISBN 978-0375712258
- 2016 Odes, Knopf ISBN 978-0451493644
- 2017 Penguin Modern Poets 3: Your Family, Your Body by Malika Booker, Sharon Olds, Warsan Shire. Penguin. ISBN 0141984023
- 2019 Arias Penguin Random House ISBN 978-1-787-33215-7
- 2022 Balladz Alfred A. Knopf ISBN 978-1-5247-1161-0
