= The Snow Child =

2012 novel by Eowyn Ivey

The Snow Child: A Novel
- First edition
- Author: Eowyn Ivey
- Language: English
- Publisher: Reagan Arthur/Little, Brown
- Publication date: February 1, 2012
- Publication place: United States
- Pages: 400
- ISBN: 9780316175678
- OCLC: 707964760

The Snow Child is the debut novel by Eowyn Ivey. It was first published on February 1, 2012, by Little, Brown and Company. The novel was a finalist for the 2013 Pulitzer Prize for Fiction and was generally well received by critics.

The Snow Child, derived from the Russian folk tale, is set in Alaska in the 1920s and follows Jack and Mabel, a childless older couple struggling as homesteaders in the Alaskan wilderness. The sudden emergence of a young girl from the woods changes their lives.

== Synopsis ==
Jack and Mabel long to have a child of their own, but after burying their newborn baby, they are forced to give up that dream. Desperate for a change of scene, the middle-aged couple moves from their farm in Pennsylvania to Alpine, Alaska where they want to set up a homestead, clear out the trees, and build the land for farming.

Unfortunately, this goal isn't as easy as it seems. Feeling down on their luck due to their lack of money, the couple has to find joy wherever they can. They end up making friends with their neighbors George and Esther Benson and getting to know the couple's 13-year-old son Garrett. Jack and Mabel also embrace their youth by playing in the snow, leading them to create a female child out of the snow.

The next day, the red mittens and scarf are missing and the snow is in a pile. To make matters even more strange, Jack and Mabel see a child's footprints in the snow and even catch rare glimpses of the child herself in the trees. Mabel believes it's a Russian fairy tale from her childhood come true, but Jack is doubtful and wants to hunt down the child in the woods.

Eventually, Jack and Mabel discover that the snow child is actually a real girl living off the land. Her name is Faina after the light that streams through the mountains. Her father died, leaving her alone to survive. However, the snow is Faina's home and she doesn't know anything else.

Mabel desperately wants Faina to come live in their cabin, but Faina wants to stay a child of the snow. This conflict is what guides the rest of the narrative.

== Musical adaptions ==
Ivey's novel was the basis for an opera by British composer Eric Wetherell with the text adapted by his wife Elizabeth Major. It was first performed at the Redgrave Theatre in Bristol on 23 September 2014.

The novel was also adapted into a musical play which premiered at Arena Stage's Kreeger Theater in Washington, D.C., on April 13, 2018. The musical featured a book by John Strand, music by Bob Banghart and Georgia Stitt, and lyrics by Stitt. The premiere production, which was co-produced by Juneau, Alaska's Perseverance Theatre, was directed by Arena Stage artistic director Molly Smith and starred Matt Bogart and Christiane Noll as Jack and Mabel, respectively. Additional cast included Alex Alferov as Garrett, Dan Manning as George, Fina Strazza as Faina, and Natalie Toro as Esther.
