= Narciso Contreras =

Mexican documentary photographer and photojournalist

Narciso Contreras (born 1 July 1975, Mexico City (Valle de Anahuac) is a documentary photographer and photojournalist born in Mexico City (Valle de Anahuac). Since 2010, he has covered a variety of issues and topics in four different continents, leading him to focus his work on the humanitarian cost of conflicts, economics and war. He is known for documenting the war in Syria, the military coup in Egypt, the war in Yemen, and for being the first to bring international audiences proof in pictures of human trafficking and slavery in Libya.

His work has been exhibited in galleries, museums and photo festivals in Europe, Asia, the USA and Mexico. At the Saatchi Gallery in London his exhibition “Libya: a human marketplace" ranked the most visited exhibition in photojournalism in the world in 2017, and 3rd in Photography category with more than 520,000 visitors.

== Biography ==
His father, a professor in philosophy, started teaching him from childhood at the age of eight, driving him to study philosophy at a later time at the National Autonomous University of Mexico (UNAM –Universidad Nacional Autónoma de Mexico). His interest in documentary cinema lead him to apply to study cinematography, but he was rejected from entering the two most prestigious schools in Mexico after failing the photography test during the selection process of applicants. He went on to study photography at the Active School of Photography (EAF – Escuela Activa de Fotografia) and simultaneously visual anthropology at the National School of Anthropology and History (ENAH –Escuela Nacional de Antropologia e Historia) in Mexico City. After graduating from photography he began doing non-paid assignments for local newspapers and started publishing his first reports.

While studying Hinduism at university, he came into contact with Gaudiya Vaishnava monks. He moved to live in a monastery in Vrindavan, India to continue his studies. While there he photographed spiritual communities in the north and the influence of Maoism on the religious society of Nepal.

In 2010, after closing this period and motivated by unfolding events in the region he decided to move to Thailand to the border with Myanmar where he started working on documenting the ethnic war along the tribal areas in the country’s Karen and Kachin States. This was the beginning of his career as professional photographer. The ethnic war in Myanmar and the separatist strife in the Kashmir region controlled by India were the first stories of conflict he documented. He first joined Zuma Press agency, and then moved to the New York based agency, Polaris Images.

In July 2012, Contreras made his first incursion into the Middle East, covering the war in Syria. His pictures depicting the horrors of the war and the carnage over the civilian population were significant, and in some cases, unforgettable. While covering the war in Syria he started collaborating as stringer with the AP agency, a partnership that ended a year later after a controversy over a doctored photograph was made public.

In July 2013, he was assigned to cover the military coup in Egypt for The New York Times among other assignments for different media outlets in the term of the next two years, counting in his records the political upheavals in Istanbul in 2013, the war in Gaza in 2014, and the tribal conflict in Libya in the same year.

Aside from photographing some of the major events in the Middle East he also aimed to document under reported yet crucial affairs in the region lifting his camera to photograph in July 2015 one of the most controversial unfolding wars in the region’s recent history, the entangled war in Yemen.

With support from the Fondation Carmignac, after winning the Carmignac Photojournalism Award in November 2015, Contreras brought to light “Libya: a human marketplace”, A report that narrates his thoughts and observations as he travelled through the complex tribal society of post-Gaddafi Libya from February to June 2016, photographing the brutal reality of human trafficking. It was the dawn of a long-term project documenting a modern-day slavery issue framed on the trafficking of human beings along the network that stretches from the Niger border with Libya, to the main rescue zone in the Mediterranean Sea, off the Libyan shoreline.

It became a cornerstone of his current work focused on migration as part of a life project of photographic documentation based on the world conceived phenomenon of "massive human displacement".

Contreras received the recognition title of HIPGiver in 2017 from Hispanics in Philanthropy for his contribution in photography.

== Incident with Associated Press ==
Contreas was sacked by the Associated Press in 2014 for digitally manipulating an image in violation of the AP's rules. He had shared a Pulitzer Prize the previous year for his work for the AP in the Syrian conflict. He had digitally altered an image to remove a video camera from the corner of the frame. Contreas said "I made a horrible mistake and I accept full responsibility for it." He insisted that he had not altered any other images, and a review by the AP of the nearly 500 photographs he had submitted to them did not reveal any other examples.

Contreras brought back in 2016, with the help of the Carmignac Photojournalism Award, a photojournalism grant which supports each year the production of an investigative photographic report on a region of the world where fundamental rights are threatened, the first proofs of slavery in Libya.

== Publications ==
- Syria’s war: a journal of pain. War Photo Limited, 2014. Photographs and text by Contreras. Catalogue.
- Libya: a human marketplace. Fondation Carmignac/Skira, 2016. Photography by Contreras. Texts by Ela Stapley & Narciso Contreras. Monograph/Catalogue.
