= Pieces of Winter Sky =

Chamber music composition by Aaron Jay Kernis

Pieces of Winter Sky is a composition for chamber ensemble by the American composer Aaron Jay Kernis. The work was commissioned by the consortium Music Accord for the ensemble eighth blackbird. The piece was a runner-up for 2013 Pulitzer Prize for Music, losing to Caroline Shaw's Partita for 8 Voices.

== Composition ==
Pieces of Winter Sky has a duration of roughly 22 minutes and is composed in a single movement. Kernis described the composition in the score program notes, remarking:

Pieces of Winter Sky evokes the still, lingering, misty, gray winter sky – hovering, immobile. There is occasionally turbulence on the surface but underlying lyricism is at its core. Rather than affecting a narrative arc or clear dramatic progression, Pieces of Winter Sky is a sequence of short episodes, some closely related and connected in sequence, others strongly contrasting and sharply juxtaposed. Fragments of bird song, most notably the song of the Winter Wren (heard in slow motion), are played by the clarinet, beginning a middle section which features soloists from the ensemble – clarinet cello, violin and piano. Flute/piccolo is often highlighted, and percussion provide~ an ongoing shimmer. The soundworld of Pieces of Winter Sky is unified by the resonant sustained sounds of bowing – bowed piano, crotales, vibraphone, cymbals, and, in some performances, bowed glockenspiel. Schubert's aching, unyielding song cycle, Winterreise (Winter Journey) echoes from the distant past – like faint, spiritual radio waves....

=== Instrumentation ===
The work is scored for a small ensemble comprising flute, clarinet, percussion, piano, violin, and cello.
