= Elizabeth McGowan =

American journalist and author (born 1961)

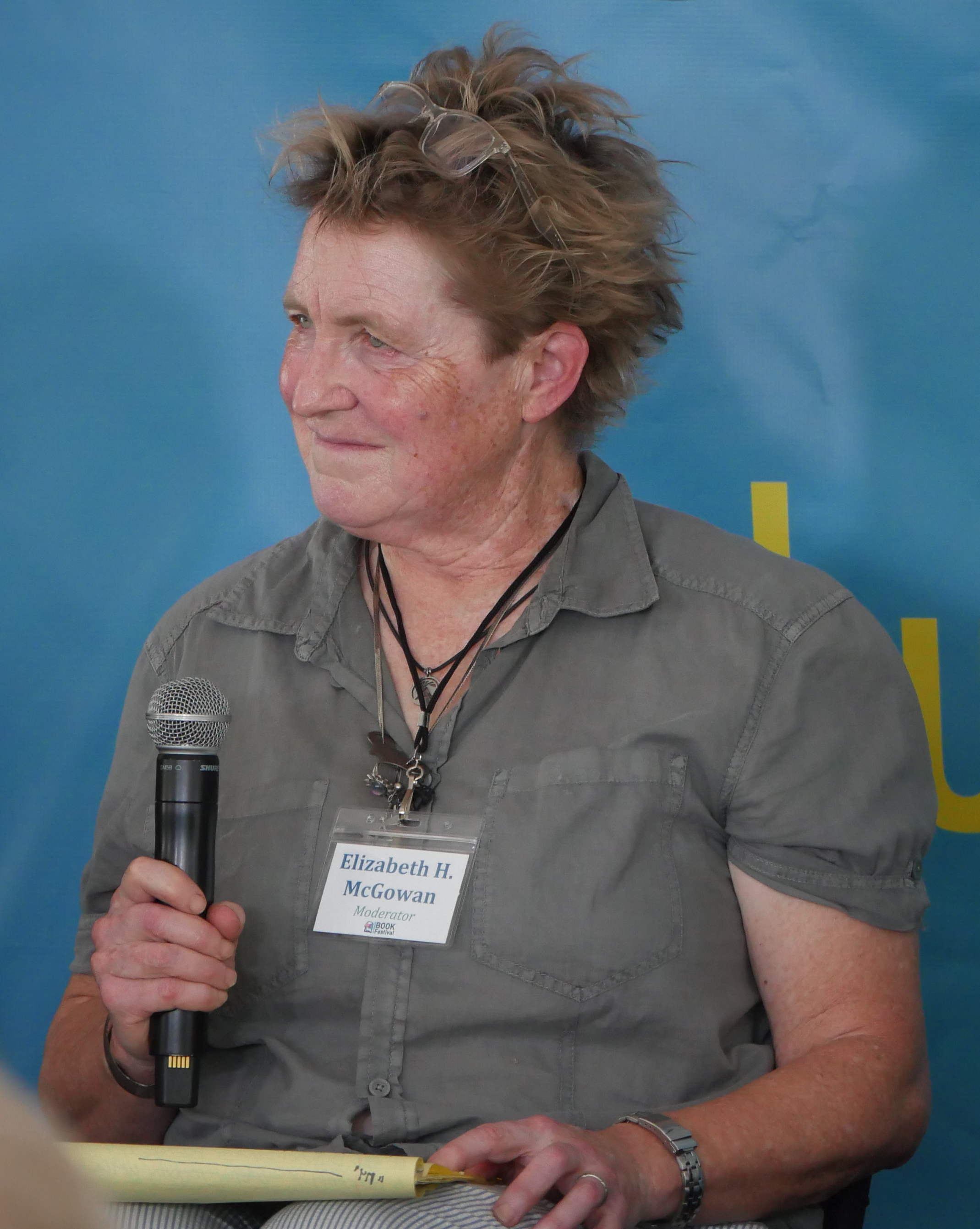
- Elizabeth McGowan
- Born: April 15, 1961 (age 65); Philadelphia, Pennsylvania, USA
- Education: BJ, 1983, University of Missouri
- Occupation: Journalist
- Spouse: Don Looney
- Awards: 2013, Pulitzer Prize for National Reporting

Elizabeth H. McGowan (born April 15, 1961) is an American journalist and author. With David Hasemyer and Lisa Song, McGowan won the 2013 Pulitzer Prize for National Reporting for their report on the Kalamazoo River oil spill.

She has worked as a freelance reporter and her work has been published by numerous newspapers, digital-outlets, and magazines such as, Grist magazine; Yale Environment 360; E/The Environmental Magazine; Washingtonian magazine; Intelligent Utility magazine; Outdoor America (magazine of the Izaak Walton League); the journal Appalachia; Capital Community News; the Gulf of Maine Times; Mizzou, the alumni magazine for the University of Missouri; Lore, the magazine of the Milwaukee Public Museum; and Nature Conservancy magazine.

McGowan met her husband, Don Looney, in 1991, when she decided to hike the entire Appalachian Trail after one of many cancer treatments; they married in 1997. Both of them are active volunteers.

== Biography ==
McGowan was born in Philadelphia, Pennsylvania, in 1961. She earned her Bachelor of Journalism at the Missouri School of Journalism in 1983.

=== Career and battle with cancer ===
In 1985, while living in Burlington, Vermont, she was diagnosed with melanoma, the same type of cancer that had taken her father, Ronald McGowan, who died of melanoma at age 44; she was 24 years old. Doctors removed the melanoma, but in late 1986, the cancer had spread to her lymph nodes, and after removal, she enrolled in a trial of a new drug, interferon, the infusions and treatment lasting for 11 months.

McGowan moved to Wisconsin and began working full-time in December 1987, for the Janesville Gazette. She continued to work even after a follow-up visit revealed that the cancer had returned. In 1989, an x-ray and biopsy confirmed that "little metastases" were present in both of her lungs. That summer, she went through 4 rounds of an experimental cocktail of chemotherapy drugs, called the Dartmouth Regimen. The normal treatment regimen consisted of 3 rounds, but after consulting with her doctors, they agreed to the additional round. She worked for the Gazette until the spring of 1991. That year, after hearing the good news that the cancer was gone, she decided to go to Springer Mountain and the hike the entire Appalachian Trail. McGowan met her husband, Don Looney, on the hike.

McGowan returned to Wisconsin and in the mid-1990s, she worked for 5 years as a reporter for The Times Journal, covering government and writing feature articles. However, in 1994, her fight with cancer returned, this time invading her liver, requiring surgery. She fully recovered.

In August 2000, in celebration of 5-years of being cancer-free, she used her experience to raise funds for the Waukesha Memorial hospital, by riding her bicycle, solo, from coast to coast. She called her trek, "Heals on Wheels."

McGowan began her bicycle trip from Astoria, Oregon, to the Atlantic Ocean in Virginia, along the TransAmerica Trail, a 4,250-mile ride. She finished the trek in November, at the Chesapeake bay. In 2020, she wrote a book on her experience with cancer titled, Outpedaling the Big C: My Healing Cycle Across America.

=== 2013 pulitzer prize ===
In 2010, McGowan joined the staff of InsideClimate News, a non-profit news organization, as their Washington, D.C. correspondent. During her tenure with InsideClimate, she won the 2013 Pulitzer Prize for National Reporting with David Hasemyer and Lisa Song for their report on the Kalamazoo River oil spill.

The 3-part series, and follow up stories, were the result of a 15-month investigation on pipeline safety and Dilbit, a controversial form of oil. In the cover letter for entry to the prize, dilbit is described as "a thick Canadian hydrocarbon called bitumen that is diluted with liquid chemicals so that it can flow through pipes." The pipeline already had corrosion problems and it was more than a week before the EPA knew that they were dealing with dilbit, because the pipeline operators weren't required to tell first responders in the event of a spill; dilbit is different from normal oil, in that the chemicals evaporate and the thick, different form of oil, sinks to the bottom and is very difficult to clean up. The series and follow-up reporting is listed below.

- "The Dilbit Disaster: Inside the biggest oil spill you've never heard of, Part 1," Elizabeth McGowan and Lisa Song, InsideClimate News, June 26, 2012.
- "The Dilbit Disaster: Inside the biggest oil spill you've never heard of, Part 2," Elizabeth McGowan and Lisa Song, InsideClimate News, June 27, 2012.
- "The Dilbit Disaster: Inside the biggest oil spill you've never heard of, Part 3," Elizabeth McGowan and Lisa Song, InsideClimate News, June 28, 2012.
- "Epilogue: Cleanup, Consequences and Lives Changed in the Dilbit Disaster," Elizabeth McGowan and Lisa Song, InsideClimate News, June 29, 2012.
- "New Pipeline Safety Regulations Won't Apply to Keystone XL," Elizabeth McGowan and Lisa Song, InsideClimate News, July 26, 2012.
- "Angry Michigan Residents Fight Uneven Battle Against Pipeline Project on Their Land," David Hasemeyer, InsideClimate News, September 12, 2012.
- "Few Oil Pipeline Spills Detected by Much-Touted Technology," Lisa Song, InsideClimate News, September 19, 2012.
- "EPA Worries Dilbit Still a Threat to Kalamazoo River, More than 2 Years After Spill," David Hasemeyer, InsideClimate News, October 11, 2012.
- "Keystone XL Would Not Use Most Advanced Spill Protection Technology," Lisa Song, InsideClimate News, December 20, 2012.
- "Little Oversight for Enbridge Pipeline Route that Skirts Lake Michigan," Lisa Song and David Hasemyer, InsideClimate News, December 27, 2012.

When the 2013 Pulitzer prize winners were announced, InsideClimate News was one of the least known of the digital news organizations; Politico's headline described the win in their headline, "For a scrappy environmental-news startup, journalism's most prestigious award." Digital-only prizes had only been awarded since 2009 and very few had won. According to the cover letter, in the entry for the prize, the investigations stemmed from research that Lisa Song had originally began, and McGowan and Hasemyer joined in shortly after.

In 2013, after winning the Pulitzer prize, she left InsideClimate News to write her book on her experience with cancer titled, Outpedaling the Big C: My Healing Cycle Across America, which was published in 2020.

== Awards and recognition ==
- 2007 2nd place, for Public Service and Investigative News, Cleveland Press Club's Ohio Excellence in Journalism Awards, Crain Communications' Waste and Recycling News, "H-2B: A Question of Labor."
- 2012 Finalist for the Scripps Howard Nation's Best 2012 Journalism Awards, for Environmental Reporting, (with Lisa Song and David Hasemyer) for "Dilbit Disaster: Inside The Biggest Oil Spill You've Never Heard Of," InsideClimate News.
- 2012 Honorable Mention, John B. Oakes Award for Distinguished Environmental Journalism, (with Lisa Song and David Hasemyer) for "Dilbit Disaster: Inside The Biggest Oil Spill You've Never Heard Of."
- 2013 Winner James Aronson Award for Social Justice Reporting, (with Lisa Song and David Hasemyer) for "Dilbit Disaster: Inside The Biggest Oil Spill You've Never Heard Of," InsideClimate News.
- 2013 Deadline Club, NYC Chapter of the Society of Professional Journalists for Reporting by Independent Digital Media (with Lisa Song) for "Dilbit Disaster: Inside The Biggest Oil Spill You've Never Heard Of," InsideClimate News.
- 2013 Winner Pulitzer Prize for National Reporting, (with Lisa Song and David Hasemyer), for their 3-part series, "The Dilbit Disaster: Inside The Biggest Oil Spill You've Never Heard Of," InsideClimate News. The e-book on the same topic received the Rachel Carson Environment Book Award
- 2017 The National Press Club featured McGowan in their "spotlight" issue, Winter 2017

According to a list of reporting awards on the Renewal News website, the “Dilbit Disaster” series also won a digital media reporting award from the Deadline Club, the New York Chapter of the Society of Professional Journalists, and honorable mention in the John B. Oakes Award for Distinguished Environmental Reporting presented at Columbia University.

== Bibliography ==
- The Dilbit Disaster: Inside The Biggest Oil Spill You've Never Heard Of, McGowan, Song and Hasemyer, CreateSpace Independent Publishing Platform, October 19, 2016.
- Outpedaling the Big C: My Healing Cycle Across America, Bancroft Press, 1st edition, September 6, 2020.
- "Trailing Dreams: Magic Along the Appalachian Trail," featured as a chapter in the book, No Limits But The Sky, Appalachian Mountain Club Books, Christine Woodside,1st edition, October 21, 2014.
