= Jackson Diehl =

American journalist

- Born: San Antonio, Texas, U.S.
- Education: Yale College
- Occupation: Journalist
- Writing career
- Subject: Foreign affairs

Jackson Diehl (born 1956) is a newspaper editor and reporter. He was the deputy editorial page editor of The Washington Post from February 2001 to August 2021. He was part of the Washington Post team that won the 2022 Pulitzer Prize in Public Service. He wrote many of the paper's editorials on foreign affairs, helped to oversee the editorial and op-ed pages and authored a regular column. He is a member of the Council on Foreign Relations and can speak Spanish and Polish.

Diehl was born in San Antonio, Texas. He received a B.A. from Yale College in 1978.

== Career ==
Diehl joined The Washington Post as a reporter in 1978. From 1982 to 1992, he worked at the paper's foreign bureaus in Buenos Aires, Warsaw and Jerusalem. He was foreign editor and assistant managing editor for foreign news from 1992 to 1999, and oversaw the expansion of The Washington Post's foreign staff. In 1999, he became assistant managing editor for national news and oversaw coverage of the 2000 presidential election campaign.

As an editor and columnist, Diehl favored the 2003 invasion of Iraq under the George W. Bush administration. Diehl had advocated for democratic reforms and a tougher U.S. policy toward Egypt, criticizing Barack Obama for his "dangerous passivity," and in 2011 he was a Finalist for the Pulitzer Prize for Editorial Writing, for his commentary on Egypt.

=== Coverage of Venezuela ===
In Jan of 2010, Diehl criticized Venezuelan President Hugo Chavez and the Bolivarian Revolution and wrote that "Chavez's socialism for the 21st century" had been defeated "and is on its way to collapse."

In October 2011, Diehl, in his opinion column, Obama's policy on Venezuela leaves Chavez's victims paying price, criticized the Obama administration over their foot-dragging, in granting asylum for Nelson Mezerhane. Mezerhane, who had been threatened by Chavez, to stifle Globolvision's network coverage criticizing Chavez, had fled Venezuela, after he and his family faced threats to their lives. Diehl noted in his column, that asylum decisions should be nonpolitical, but under Hillary Clinton's State Department, a strategy of avoiding "scrapes" with Chavez, left people like Mezerhane danger. In his column he wrote:

"The price of this policy is borne by Chavez’s victims — journalists, union leaders, businessmen, would-be opposition presidential candidates — whom he persecutes and frequently drives out of Venezuela. The administration rarely speaks up for these beleaguered defenders of human rights and democracy; and when it does, then only at a low level. It has made no effort to hold Chavez accountable at forums like the Organization of American States."

Diehl was also critical of the Trump administration's handling of Venezuelan President Nicolás Maduro, saying of Trump's foreign policy, in his column in January 2020:

"a year later, the regime of Nicolás Maduro appears to have stabilized. The lights are back on in Caracas, once-empty stores are full of goods, and the U.S.-backed opposition has been ousted — at least physically — from the National Assembly. Trump’s demand — that Maduro leave office and make way for fresh elections — won’t be realized anytime soon."

=== 2012 Syria coverage ===
Diehl was nominated for the 2013 Pulitzer Prize for Editorial Writing; in the cover letter, nominating Jackson Diehl for the Prize, Fred Hiatt wrote:

"Since the conflict in Syria began in March 2011, Jackson Diehl has written about it in editorials that have been prescient, passionate, practical – and 100 percent correct. Diehl warned early in 2012 that the Obama administration’s diplomatic initiatives were certain to fail. He explained why. He was proved right."

The series of editorial columns, that resulted in Diehl becoming a finalist for the prize, are listed below.

- Time to lead on Syria, March 8, 2012
- An unworkable plan for Syria, March 23, 2012
- Needed: Plan B for Syria, April 22, 2012
- The U.N.'s monitors of death, April 26, 2012
- As Syria burns, May 11, 2012
- Who will stop Syria's massacres?, May 30, 2012
- What to do in Syria, June 1, 2012
- Scapegoat for Syria, July 1, 2012
- Syria's hard core, August 9, 2012
- Impotent on Syria, December 31, 2012

== Awards and recognition ==
During his career, Diehl has received multiple awards as listed below.

- 1984 Inter-American Press Association Award for Interpretive Journalism, for his coverage of South America
- 1989 Bob Considine Award of the Overseas Press Association, for his coverage of the 1989 revolution in Eastern Europe.
- 2011 Finalist for the 2011 Pulitzer Prize for Editorial Writing, for his commentary on Egypt
- 2013 Finalist for the Pulitzer Prize finalist, for editorials about Syria.
- 2018 The Eugene Meyer and Ben Bradlee Award, for extraordinary journalism
- 2019 Journalist of the Year Award by the Algemeiner Foundation
- 2021 Diehl is a recipient of the Washington DC based Transatlantic Leadership Network 2021 "Freedom of the Media" Gold Medal award for Public Service
- 2022 He was part of the team that won the 2022 Pulitzer Prize in Public Service
