= Thomas Lunsford Stokes =

American journalist (1898–1958)

Thomas Lunsford Stokes, Jr. (November 1, 1898 – May 14, 1958) was a Pulitzer Prize-winning American journalist.

== Biography ==
Thomas Stokes was born in Atlanta, Georgia, on November 1, 1898, to Thomas Lunsford Stokes and Emma Layton, both descendants of colonial families. His father was a co-founder of Davison-Paxon-Stokes, a major department store chain in the southeastern United States. He graduated from the University of Georgia in 1920, after 3 years.

He began his journalism career working as a reporter for Georgia newspapers and then moved to Washington in 1921, where he took dictation from reporters at United Press. He later worked as a copy editor and then as a reporter covering all aspects of Washington politics. He greeted the New Deal with enthusiasm and his coverage of the early days of Franklin D. Roosevelt's administration brought him to the attention of the Scripps-Howard newspaper chain, which hired him as its Washington correspondent in 1933.

In 1937, the Amalgamated Clothing Workers of America reprinted a series of his articles under the title Carpetbaggers of Industry to indict businesses that relocated to the South in search of lower-earning workers.

His coverage of FDR's administration grew more critical over time. He won the Pulitzer Prize in 1939 for investigating how Kentucky politicians had corrupted the Works Progress Administration (WPA) to advance their own careers. He concluded the Kentucky WPA was "a grand political racket in which the taxpayer is the victim." Stokes and WPA Administrator Harry Hopkins traded charges for several days. Stokes explained why the WPA's investigation found fewer problems that he had:

The motives were different. I was sent to Kentucky as a reporter. I had no other instructions than to write the facts as I found them. I had no axe to grind. I lay no claims to infallibility. I yield myself to the usual margin of error. I made a careful investigation, in good faith, and I stand on my conclusions.... Mr. Hopkins ... sent WPA investigators to the State to investigate the WPA. WPA officials and workers, when confronted by WPA investigators, naturally see over the shoulders of the latter none other than Mr. Hopkins in Washington, the man who controls their jobs. It is only human for them to say "It isn't so." To this may be attributed, at least in part, the conflict in versions of what happened in individual cases. But to my mind — and I think to any fair-minded person, there can be no question about the broad, general picture. The whole atmosphere and tone of the WPA in Kentucky is political and has been at least since early March.

The Kentucky politician implicated was Senator Alben Barkley. The affair led indirectly to the passage of the Hatch Act.

He authored an autobiography, Chip Off My Shoulder, in 1940. A reviewer described him: "He is irreverent but not flip, ironic but not bitter, a hater of pretense and arrogance but not of people.

Some of his 1941 reporting on the awarding of construction contracts provoked a contentious debate in the U.S. Senate in which Senator Claude Pepper accused Stokes of "perfidious falsehood."

Stokes became a columnist for United Features Syndicate in December 1944. More than 100 newspapers ran his column. He withdrew his column from the syndicate in late 1946 because of what he perceived as too much editorial interference.

In 1947, he won the Raymond Clapper Memorial Award for general excellence in Washington reporting and crusading. He was honored again by the Raymond Clapper Memorial Association just before his death.

His second book, The Savannah, a study of the river's role in the South, appeared in 1951.

He died of a brain tumor in Washington, D.C., on May 14, 1958. He was buried in Arlington National Cemetery. His wife Hannah survived him.

The Thomas L. Stokes Award is given annually for reporting on the development, use, and conservation of energy and other natural resources.
