= Eowyn Ivey =

American novelist

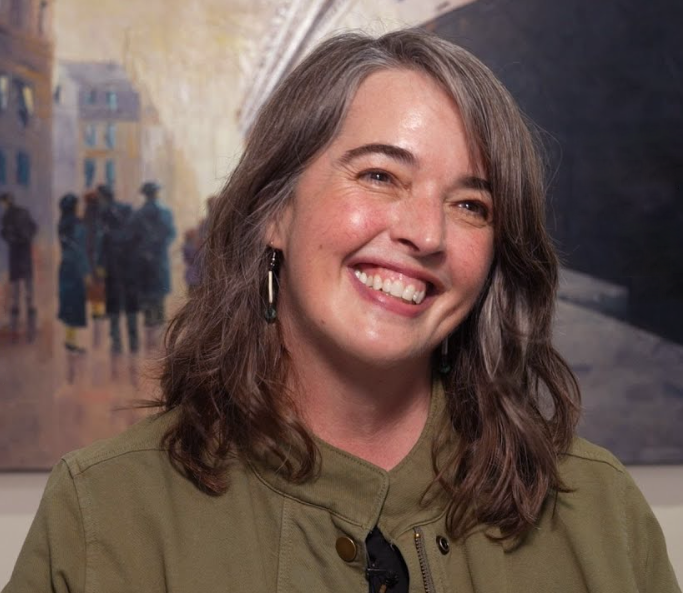
- In a 2025 interview
- Born: 1973 (age 52–53)
- Education: Western Washington University (BA)

Eowyn Ivey (born 1973) is an American author based in Alaska. She was a finalist for the Pulitzer Prize for Fiction in 2013 for her debut novel The Snow Child.

== Life and career ==
Ivey was raised in Alaska. Her mother named her after Éowyn, a character from The Lord of the Rings. She attended Palmer High School and studied at Western Washington University in Bellingham.

Ivey was a newspaper reporter at the Frontiersman in Wasilla for a decade before quitting her job to work as bookseller at Fireside Books in Palmer in order to focus on writing novels. Her first novel, The Snow Child, is set in 1920s Alaska. The book is centered around a couple called Jack and Mabel who begin seeing a girl running through the Alaskan wilderness after they sculpt a child out of snow.

Her second book, To the Bright Edge of the World is set in 1885 and also in Alaska. The story is told through journal entries, military reports, letters and documents. The plot follows an expedition funded by the US government into the Alaskan wilderness. Although a fictional account, Ivey drew inspiration from the official reports of Henry Tureman Allen's 1885 exploration of Alaska and the diaries of his expedition members.

Ivey has also written essays which have appeared in publications such as The Observer, Alaska Magazine, The Sunday Times Magazine, Woman & Home, and The Wall Street Journal.

She lives in Alaska with her husband and two children.

== Recognition ==
- 2012 - Specsavers National Book Awards for International Author of the Year for The Snow Child
- 2013 - Pulitzer Prize finalist for The Snow Child
- 2013 - Indies Choice Book Awards for Adult debut book of the year for The Snow Child

== Works ==
- The Snow Child (2012)
- To the Bright Edge of the World (2016)
- Black Woods, Blue Sky (2025)
