= Khalil Hamra =

Khalil Hamra (born 1979) is a Palestinian photojournalist based in Rafah in the Gaza Strip. In 2009, Hamra was recognized by the Overseas Press Club of America with its 2010 Robert Capa Gold Medal for his series covering the war in Gaza.

== Background ==
Khalil Hamra was born in Kuwait in 1979 to Palestinian parents and raised in Qatar, Egypt and the Palestinian Territories. In 2002, a year after graduating from the Islamic University of Gaza with a degree in journalism, Hamra took work as a freelancer with the Associated Press, based in Rafah.

In 2004, Hamra's work was featured in a group exhibition of AP photojournalists in the annual international Visa Pour L'image festival in Perpignan, France; that same year, he received a 2nd prize from Editor & Publisher for photographs he had taken of a tank strike in Israel. In 2009, he received the Overseas Press Club of America's "Robert Capa Gold Medal" for a series of photographs entitled "War in Gaza", becoming the first Associated Press photographer to win the award in more than thirty years. The Overseas Press Club praised his images as "close up, powerful and direct and taken at considerable risk due to the nature of the conflict which had combatants mingling amongst the civilian population." In February 2011, Hamra himself made news when he was injured documenting demonstrations in Tahrir Square, Alexandria during the 2011 Egyptian revolution.

== Awards ==
- APME photo award 2003
- APME photo award 2007
- Robert Capa Gold Medal Award 2009
- APME photo award 2010
- Atlanta photography award 2010
- 2010: Joint Second Prize, Days Japan International Photojournalism Awards.
- PGB photo award 2010
- Headliner photo award 2010
- Pictures of the Year International photo award 2010
- Pulitzer Prize, shared with 3 others, 2013
