= 2007 Pulitzer Prize =

Awards for journalism and related fields

The Pulitzer Prizes for 2007 were announced on April 16, 2007.

In November 2006, the Pulitzer Prize Board announced two changes that would apply to the 2007 awards:

- "online elements will be permitted in all journalism categories except for the competition's two photography categories, which will continue to restrict entries to still images."
- a "category called Local Reporting will replace Beat Reporting as one of the 14 prizes in journalism"; the board explained that "while the local category replaces the Beat Reporting category that was created in 1991, the work of beat reporters remains eligible for entry in a wide range of categories that include—depending on the specialty involved— national, investigative, and explanatory reporting, as well as the new local category."

== Journalism ==
Public service	The Wall Street Journal	"For its creative and comprehensive probe into backdated stock options for business executives that triggered investigations, the ouster of top officials and widespread change in corporate America."	The gold medal awarded for Public Service in Journalism.
Breaking news reporting	Staff of The Oregonian, Portland, Oregon	"For its skillful and tenacious coverage of a family missing in the Oregon mountains, telling the tragic story both in print and online."	
Investigative reporting	Brett Blackledge of The Birmingham News in Alabama	"For his exposure of cronyism and corruption in the state's two-year college system, resulting in the dismissal of the chancellor and other corrective action."	
Explanatory reporting	Kenneth R. Weiss, Usha Lee McFarling and Rick Loomis of the Los Angeles Times	"For their richly portrayed reports on the world's distressed oceans, telling the story in print and online, and stirring reaction among readers and officials."	
Local reporting	Debbie Cenziper of The Miami Herald	"For reports on waste, favoritism and lack of oversight at the Miami housing agency that resulted in dismissals, investigations and prosecutions."	
National reporting	Charlie Savage of The Boston Globe	"For his revelations that President Bush often used "signing statements" to assert his controversial right to bypass provisions of new laws."	
International reporting	Staff of The Wall Street Journal	"For its sharply edged reports on the adverse impact of China's booming capitalism on conditions ranging from inequality to pollution."	
Feature writing	Andrea Elliott of The New York Times	"For her intimate, richly textured portrait of an immigrant imam striving to find his way and serve his faithful in America."	
Commentary	Cynthia Tucker of The Atlanta Journal-Constitution	"For her courageous, clear-headed columns that evince a strong sense of morality and persuasive knowledge of the community."	
Criticism	Jonathan Gold of LA Weekly	"For his zestful, wide-ranging restaurant reviews, expressing the delight of an erudite eater."	
Editorial writing	The editorial board of the New York Daily News	"For its compassionate and compelling editorials on behalf of Ground Zero workers whose health problems were neglected by the city and the nation."	
Editorial cartooning	Walt Handelsman of Newsday, of Long Island, New York	"For his stark, sophisticated cartoons and his impressive use of zany animation."	
Breaking news photography	Oded Balilty of The Associated Press	"For his powerful photograph of a lone Jewish woman defying Israeli security forces as they remove illegal settlers in the West Bank."	
Feature photography	Renée C. Byer of The Sacramento Bee, of California	"For her intimate portrayal of a single mother and her young son as he loses his battle with cancer."	

== Letters, Drama and Music Awards ==
Fiction	The Road by Cormac McCarthy (Alfred A. Knopf)
Drama	Rabbit Hole by David Lindsay-Abaire (TCG)
History	The Race Beat by Gene Roberts and Hank Klibanoff (Alfred A. Knopf)
Biography	The Most Famous Man in America by Debby Applegate (Doubleday)
Poetry	Native Guard by Natasha Trethewey (Houghton Mifflin)
General Nonfiction	The Looming Tower by Lawrence Wright (Alfred A. Knopf)
Music	Sound Grammar by Ornette Coleman (Sound Grammar)

== Special Citations ==
- Ray Bradbury received an extraordinary citation "for his distinguished, prolific and deeply influential career as an unmatched author of science fiction and fantasy."
- John Coltrane received an extraordinary posthumous citation "for his masterful improvisation, supreme musicianship and iconic centrality to the history of jazz."
