= Claude Sitton =

American journalist

- Born: Claude Fox Sitton; December 4, 1925; Atlanta, Georgia, U.S.
- Died: March 10, 2015 (aged 89); Atlanta, Georgia, U.S.
- Education: Emory University
- Occupations: Newspaper reporter, editor
- Spouse: Eva Whetstone (m. 1953)
- Writing career
- Years active: 1950s – 1990s
- Notable awards: Pulitzer Prize for Commentary (1983)

Claude Fox Sitton (December 4, 1925 – March 10, 2015) was an American newspaper reporter and editor. He worked for The New York Times during the 1950s and 1960s, known for his coverage of the civil rights movement. He went on to become national news director of the Times and then editor of The News & Observer in Raleigh, North Carolina.

== Early life and education ==
Claude Fox Sitton was born in Atlanta, Georgia, to Claude Booker and Pauline Fox Sitton and raised on a farm in Rockdale County, Georgia. He had one sibling, Paul Lyon Sitton, who was the first administrator of the Urban Mass Transportation Administration.

Sitton graduated from high school in 1943 and entered the Merchant Marine before joining the U.S. Navy. He reached the rank of boatswain’s mate 2nd class in the Navy. His primary ship was the USS LST-706.

Taking advantage of the G.I. Bill, Sitton entered Oxford College of Emory University, moving to Emory's main campus, in Atlanta, after a year. Sitton, who started out as a business major, graduated in 1949 with a journalism degree. While at Emory, he was editor-in-chief of the student newspaper, The Emory Wheel. He returned to his alma mater to teach from 1991 to 1994, and was a member of Board of Counselors of Oxford College from 1993 to 2001.

In 1953, Sitton married Eva McLaurin Whetstone. They had four children, Lauren Lea, Clinton Whetstone, Suzanna Fox and Claude McLaurin.

== Career ==
Sitton started out with wire services, working for International News Service and United Press. Wanting to work outside the country, he joined the United States Information Agency in 1955 as an information officer and press attaché at the American Embassy in Ghana.

=== The New York Times ===
Sitton joined The New York Times as a copy editor in 1957. Nine months later, he was named Southern correspondent. Sitton covered the civil rights movement for the Times from 1958 to 1964. In the Pulitzer Prize-winning history of civil rights journalism The Race Beat, authors Gene Roberts and Hank Klibanoff describe Sitton as the standard bearer for civil rights journalism in the 1950s.

"Sitton's byline would be atop the stories that landed on the desks of three presidents," they write. "His phone number would be carried protectively in the wallets of the civil rights workers who saw him, and the power of his byline, as their best hope for survival."

In 1964, Sitton was named national news director of the Times. He left the Times in 1968 for The News & Observer.

=== The News & Observer ===
In 1968, Sitton moved to Raleigh, North Carolina, to become editorial director and vice president of The News and Observer Publishing Co. Within two years, he was also editor of The News & Observer. He oversaw the editorial and news pages of The News & Observer and the news in its afternoon sister paper, The Raleigh Times.

Sitton was a forceful editor who was determined to hold accountable those he thought were not acting in the public good. Among those his paper covered who eventually stepped down were Wake County school superintendent John Murphy, North Carolina State University Chancellor Bruce Poulton and popular NCSU basketball coach Jim Valvano.

Sitton retired in 1990 as editor of The News & Observer and vice president of The News & Observer Publishing Co.

== Death ==
Sitton died March 10, 2015, in hospice care in Atlanta, Georgia, from congestive heart failure. He was 89. Survivors included his wife of 61 years, Eva Whetstone, four children and 10 grandchildren.

== Awards ==
In addition to the Pulitzer for commentary, which he won in 1983, Sitton received the George Polk Career Award (1991) and John Chancellor Award for excellence in journalism (2000). Sitton lived in Oxford, Georgia.
