= John Herbers =

American journalist

John N. Herbers
- Born: November 4, 1923; Memphis, Tennessee
- Died: March 17, 2017 (aged 93); Washington, D.C.
- Occupations: Journalist, Author
- Children: 4
- Writing career
- Genre: Non-fiction

John N. Herbers (November 4, 1923 – March 17, 2017) was an American journalist, author, editor, World War II veteran, and Pulitzer Prize finalist.

== Early life ==
After graduating from Haywood High School in Brownsville, Tennessee in 1941, Herbers served as a combat infantryman in the Pacific during World War II from 1941 to 1944. After the war, he studied at Emory University, graduating in 1949.

== Career ==
=== Local and regional reporting ===
Herbers began his career at Morning Star in Greenwood, Mississippi, (1949–1950) and Daily News in Jackson, Mississippi (1951–1952). In 1951, he submitted news stories from the trial and execution of Willie McGee, an African-American from Laurel, Mississippi, who was accused and convicted of raping a white woman, though McGee claimed that their relationship was consensual. The McGee case drew national attention with numerous national celebrities and civil right activists claiming that McGee was framed. From 1953 to 1963, Herbers reported for the United Press International from Jackson, Mississippi and was bureau chief from 1955 to 1961. In 1954, he covered the murder of fourteen-year-old Emmett Till in Money, Mississippi, and the subsequent trial. The acquittal of the child's murderers had a profound effect on Herbers, who recalled it vividly even sixty years later. He was interviewed in 2003 about the experience for the Emmy Award-winning PBS documentary The Murder of Emmett Till.

=== Civil Rights Movement ===
Herbers joined the staff of the New York Times in 1963 as a civil rights correspondent in Atlanta, covering demonstrations in Montgomery and Selma, Alabama, and in St. Augustine, Florida. When covering demonstrations in St. Augustine, Herbers, his wife, and their four daughters were threatened in the middle of the night by a white supremacist vigilante group. He covered the murders of four civil rights workers in Mississippi during the Freedom Summer of 1964 and the KKK bombing of 16th Street Baptist Church in Birmingham, Alabama, that resulted in the death of four children. He interviewed Martin Luther King Jr. and reported on Malcolm X's Selma visit sixteen days prior to his assassination. Herbers was the third Southerner to cover the South for the New York Times in the modern era. In 1965, he covered the enforcement of civil rights laws from Washington, D.C.

=== Post-Civil Rights ===
From 1966 to 1968, Herbers was stationed in Washington, D.C., and covered Congress as well as presidential campaigns, including that of Robert F. Kennedy. The summer of 1968, he witnessed and reported on the Robert Kennedy assassination and then reported from the 1968 Democratic Convention in Chicago, where anti-war protesters and police rioted in the streets. In 1969, he was made the New York Times Urban Affairs National Correspondent and reported on city riots, anti-Vietnam demonstrations, and college campus upheavals. During the administrations of Richard Nixon and Gerald Ford, Herbers was a White House correspondent for the Times. He covered the Watergate events, the front-page "Nixon Resigns" article was his, and he wrote Nixon's obituary. Herbers was appointed the Times' assistant national editor in 1975, deputy Washington bureau chief in 1977, and national Washington correspondent in 1979. From 1979 to 1987, Herbers was The New York Times' national correspondent, and he traveled the country reporting on national trends in politics, government, and social movements. One of his specialties was demographics and changes in the population. He retired from The New York Times in 1987.

=== Later years ===
From 1987 to 1990, Herbers was a visiting instructor at Princeton University and the University of Maryland, teaching seminars on politics and the press. He served as writer and columnist for Governing magazine for three years and was appointed a member of and consultant to the National Commission on State and Local Public Service. Encouraged by his daughter, Anne Farris Rosen, he wrote the memoir Deep South Dispatch: Memoir of a Civil Rights Journalist, which was published posthumously by the University Press of Mississippi in April 2018.

== Death ==
Herbers died on March 17, 2017, at the age of 93 in Washington, D.C. His wife, Betty Herbers, died six weeks prior to his death.

== Personal life ==
Herbers was married to Mary Elizabeth (Betty) Wood Herbers in 1952. He and Betty lived in Bethesda, Maryland, and they are survived by four daughters, six grandchildren and eight great grandchildren.

== Impact ==
In The Race Beat, a Pulitzer Prize-winning history of the press and the civil rights movement, Gene Roberts and Hank Klibanoff say that Herbers as far back as 1952 was "breaking new ground in his coverage [of Negro leaders and their activities]. [As] bureau chief, John applied a simple standard—newsworthiness—in deciding what stories to assign. Race was never a reason not to cover a story. That simple declaration set him apart."

John Lewis, U.S. representative from Georgia, and civil rights pioneer, remarked, "I got to know John when he was a reporter. To me, he was more than a reporter. Smart and gifted, he used his pen in the search for the truth. In my book, he always got it right. If it had not been for reporters like John I do not know what would have happened to us as we fought for civil rights. He was not afraid to get in the way, often risking his life to uncover the truth. He made a lasting contribution to the movement and to America."

In covering national politics, Tom Wicker, Washington bureau chief and columnist for The New York Times, explained in Jean Stein's 1970 book American Journey: The Times of Robert Kennedy why he assigned Herbers to cover Robert Kennedy's 1968 presidential campaign for the presidency. The Kennedys, he explained, had a way of making partisan supporters out of reporters who covered them and thus used them to advance their political goals. Wicker said, "When Robert Kennedy became a presidential candidate, I assigned for full-time coverage a very distinguished reporter in our Washington bureau named John Herbers. Herbers had been for years before he came to the Times UPI's correspondent in Mississippi, where he came under all imaginable sorts of pressure…. He withstood it all to a do a magnificent and honest job….I thought this was a good assignment, and I felt justified by it as the year went along because although I know that John Herbers came to be personally fond of and impressed by Robert Kennedy, his coverage throughout the year remained very dispassionate and objective…which is what we wanted."

In his bestseller Megatrends, John Naisbitt applauds Herbers' grasp of American demographics: "No one has understood and interpreted the small-town boom with more clarity than New York Times reporter John Herbers, who, in my view, is one of only three or four great American journalists. Herbers has the ability to place his individual news stories within the context of changing social, economic, and political realities, thereby offering the reader not just the facts but an interpretation of the way those facts relate to the rest of what is going on."

== Awards ==
- 1960–1961. Nieman Fellowship, Harvard University, Boston, Massachusetts.
- 1974. The Silver Em Award. University of Mississippi. School of Journalism.
- 2000. John Chancellor Award for Excellence in Journalism. Columbia Journalism School.

== Books ==
- The Lost Priority: What Happened to the Civil Rights Movement in America? Funk & Wagnalls. 1970. ISBN 978-0308701229. [on the decline of the civil rights movement]
- The Black Dilemma. The John Day Company. 1973. [study of the quest for black equality]
- No Thank You, Mr. President. Norton and Company.1976. [White House journalism]
- The New Heartland: America's Flight Beyond the Suburbs and How It Is Changing Our Future. Crown. 1986. [America's demographic changes in the 1980s]
- Deep South Dispatch: Memoir of a Civil Rights Journalist. University Press of Mississippi. 2018. ISBN 1496816749. [a personal account of the making of a protest movement and of a journalist]
