= John Chancellor Award =

Journalism award

John Chancellor Award for Excellence in Journalism is an annual award of $25,000 selected by a panel of journalists, for courageous and sustained reporting.

Established in 1995, the award was formerly administered by the University of Pennsylvania, and is administered by the Columbia University Graduate School of Journalism. Ira Lipman provided a gift to Columbia University to support the award. He became a lifelong friend of John Chancellor after they met in Little Rock, Arkansas in 1957.

== Winners ==
Year	Winner	Organization
2020	Donald McNeil Jr.	The New York Times
2019	Ginger Thompson	ProPublica
2018	Nikole Hannah-Jones	The New York Times
2017	Dan Balz	The Washington Post
2016	Gwen Ifill	PBS
2015	Alissa J. Rubin	The New York Times
2012	Maria Hinojosa	PBS, NPR
2011	David Evans	Bloomberg Markets
2010	Robert Siegel	National Public Radio
2009	Ken Armstrong	The Seattle Times
2008	Jane Mayer, Andrew C. Revkin	The New Yorker, The New York Times
2007	Ofra Bikel	PBS series FRONTLINE
2006	Henry Weinstein	Los Angeles Times
2005	Jerry Mitchell	The Clarion-Ledger, Jackson, Mississippi
2004	Linda Greenhouse	The New York Times (1968–2008)
2003	Mary McGrory	The Washington Post (1981–2004)
2002	Jim Wooten	ABC News (1979–present)
2000	John Herbers	The New York Times (1963–1987)
2000	Claude Sitton	The News & Observer Raleigh, North Carolina (1968–1990)
1999	Paul Duke	PBS (1974–1994)
1998	John Kifner	The New York Times (1963–2008)
1997	Wilson F. “Bill” Minor	The Times-Picayune New Orleans, Louisiana (1947–1976)
