= Mary Bubb =

Journalist (b. 1920, d. 1988)

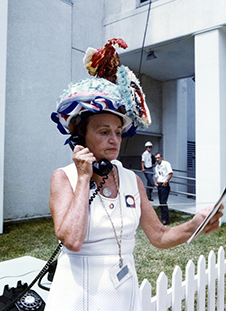
- Space Reporter
- Born: Mary Elizabeth Chaffin; September 17, 1920; Falmouth, Massachusetts, United States
- Died: March 28, 1988 (aged 67); Cape Canaveral, Florida, United States
- Education: University of Massachusetts
- Occupation: Journalist
- Employer: Fairchild Fashion Media; Reuters
- Spouse: Maurice R. Bubb
- Children: 2

Mary Bubb (née Mary Elizabeth Chaffin, 17 September 1920 – 28 March 1988) was one of the first space journalists reporting on launches out of Cape Canaveral, Florida. Bubb was the only woman reporter for military publication Daily Pacifican during World War II and the first woman space reporter.

NASA lists Bubb alongside Walter Cronkite and John Noble Wilford as one of its "Chroniclers," an honor recognizing broadcasters, journalists, authors, public relations representatives, and public affairs officers who covered Kennedy Space Center for at least a decade.

== Biography ==
=== Early life ===
Born in Falmouth and growing up in Barnstable, Massachusetts, Chaffin attended University of Massachusetts where she graduated with degrees in history and psychology.

Chaffin enlisted in the Women's Army Corps on 28 October 1943. After completing basic training, she was deployed to Oro Bay, New Guinea and Manila, the Philippines. Chaffin was the only woman reporter for the military publication Daily Pacifican, including reporting on General Tomoyuki Yamashita's trial.

After World War II, Chaffin was rejected from a job at The Boston Globe before writing for Worcester Telegram (now the Telegram & Gazette), then the Jamestown Sun in New York.

=== Inaugural space journalism at Cape Canaveral ===
A Fairchild editor spotted the opportunity presented by Bubb moving to Florida and suggested she begin covering rocket launches at Cape Canaveral Air Force Station for two new company magazines, Electronic News and Metalworking News, while continuing her usual coverage of the citrus industry for Supermarket News and other assignments for the publishing company. Her coverage was later expanded to another of their technical magazines, Aviation Week & Space Technology.

NASA did not publicize launches in the early days of Cape Canaveral, leaving the inaugural space reporters including Bubb to watch for clues of impending firings from public beaches. They carried binoculars to better see hints like shrimp boats returning to port, along with bird guides they used to support their cover of birdwatching, leading to their nickname "birdwatchers."

In 1958, Reuters News Service hired Bubb as a full-time correspondent, a position she held for the remainder of her life. Bubb continued to freelance on the side, accepting assignments from Time-Life, People, the London Daily Telegraph, Springer News, Quick Magazine in Germany, newspapers, and wire services. She also covered for other regular space reporters when they were on vacation or unavailable on other assignments.

Bubb covered NASA's Project Mercury, Project Gemini, Apollo program and Space Shuttle program. She was determined to never miss a launch, reporting on over 1,600 consecutive launches by 1980 and more than 3,000 throughout her career. When she first started, Bubbs claimed "I didn't know a rocket from a hole in the ground," but she later became known as a tenacious reporter with deep technical knowledge and a willingness to go to any lengths for a story. While NASA's head of public information Hugh Harris complimented her technical expertise after her death, during the 1960s-1970s, he wrote memos about her creating disruptions at launch events.

On 5 January 1968, Bubb launched a meteorological sounding rocket from Cape Canaveral's Launch Complex 43 under the supervision of Pan American World Airways.

Bubb regularly hosted parties in Cocoa Beach, Florida, both planned in advance and more spontaneously when launch delays kept reporters, astronauts, space program leaders, and corporate executives in town for longer than expected. Her parties were recognized as major social events, and she was a well-connected guest at other socially-prestigious events within the Cape Canaveral space community. For her less formal parties, Bubb would direct guests to bring ingredients or assist her during preparation.

Along with making history as the only women among the first space reporters at Cape Canaveral, Bubb was often a part of the story as her elaborate hats were included in pictorial coverage. Bubb customized her hats to symbolize launch events, often by translating the mission patch into three dimensions. Over time, others in the space industry brought her hats from their travels.

At the 1987 Canaveral Press Club's Page One Ball, NASA awarded Bubb a lifetime achievement award.

=== Death ===
Bubb continued working up until her death, filing a report for Reuters on Governor Bob Martinez's announcement of plans for a commercial spaceport at Cape Canaveral on 25 March 1988, the Friday before her death. Earlier that week on 21 March, she reported on the launch of five Pershing 2 missiles from Cape Canaveral Air Force Station for Reuters, Associated Press, and United Press International.

== Personal life ==
While in Jamestown, Chaffin met and married Maurice R. Bubb, changing her byline to Mary Bubb for the rest of her professional career even after the couple divorced in 1966.

The couple had two sons, Rodger and Dennis, while moving to Arizona then Illinois. During this time, Bubb switched from staff writer to freelancer, becoming a stringer for Fairchild Publications while in Peoria, Illinois.

In 1956, Bubb and family moved to Florida out of health concerns for their youngest son.
