= Michael Toner =

Michael Toner may refer to:

- Michael E. Toner, American lawyer and political appointee
- Michael Toner (journalist) (1944–2025), British journalist and writer
- Mike Toner (born 1944), American journalist
