= Pulitzer Prize for Commentary =

American journalism award

The Pulitzer Prize for Commentary is an award administered by the Columbia University Graduate School of Journalism "for distinguished commentary, using any available journalistic tool". It is one of the fourteen American Pulitzer Prizes that are annually awarded for Journalism. It has been presented since 1970 (56 years ago). Finalists have been announced from 1980, ordinarily with two others beside the winner.

The award was retired from 2026, when it was merged with the Editorial Writing category into Opinion Writing.

== Winners and citations ==
The Commentary Pulitzer has been awarded to one person annually without exception—45 prizes in 44 years 1970–2014. No person has won it twice.

Year	Name(s)	Publication	Rationale
1970	Marquis Childs	St. Louis Post-Dispatch	"for distinguished commentary during 1969."
1971	William A. Caldwell	The Record	"for his commentary in his daily column."
1972	Mike Royko	Chicago Daily News	"for his columns during 1971."
1973	David S. Broder	The Washington Post	"for his columns during 1972."
1974	Edwin A. Roberts Jr.	National Observer	"for his commentary on public affairs during 1973."
1975	Mary McGrory	The Washington Star	"for her commentary on public affairs during 1974."
1976	Red Smith	The New York Times	"for his commentary on sports in 1975 and for many other years."
1977	George Will	The Washington Post	"for distinguished commentary on a variety of topics."
1978	William Safire	The New York Times	"for commentary on the Bert Lance affair."
1979	Russell Baker	The New York Times	
1980	Ellen Goodman	The Boston Globe	
1980	Richard Reeves	Universal Press Syndicate	
1980	Carl Rowan	Chicago Sun-Times	
1981	Dave Anderson	The New York Times	"for his commentary on sports."
1981	Richard Cohen	The Washington Post	
1981	Howard Rosenberg	Los Angeles Times	
1982	Art Buchwald	Los Angeles Times	
1982	William Greider	The Washington Post	
1982	William Raspberry	The Washington Post	
1983	Claude Sitton	The News and Observer	
1983	Ross Mackenzie	The Richmond News Leader	
1983	David Rossie	The Binghamton Evening Press	
1984	Vermont C. Royster	The Wall Street Journal	
1984	Arnold Rosenfeld	Dayton Daily News	
1984	Dorothy Storck	The Philadelphia Inquirer	
1985	Murray Kempton	Newsday	"for witty and insightful reflection on public issues in 1984 and throughout a distinguished career."
1985	Molly Ivins	Dallas Times Herald	
1985	Martin Nolan	The Boston Globe	
1986	Jimmy Breslin	New York Daily News	"for columns which consistently champion ordinary citizens."
1986	Joseph Kraft	Los Angeles Times	"for incisive and thoughtful commentary on a wide range of public issues throughout a long and distinguished career."
1986	Charles Krauthammer	The Washington Post	"for his gracefully written and clear commentary on a variety of issues."
1987	Charles Krauthammer	The Washington Post	"for his witty and insightful columns on national issues."
1987	Richard Cohen	The Washington Post	"for his eloquent columns on social and political issues."
1987	Donald Kaul	The Gazette	"for his compelling commentary on national events."
1988	Dave Barry	Miami Herald	"for his consistently effective use of humor as a device for presenting fresh insights into serious concerns."
1988	Ira Berkow	The New York Times	"for thoughtful commentary on the sports scene."
1988	Molly Ivins	Dallas Times Herald	"for her witty columns on a variety of social and political issues."
1988	Michael Kinsley	United Feature Syndicate	"for his incisive commentary on a wide range of political topics."
1989	Clarence Page	Chicago Tribune	"for his provocative columns on local and national affairs."
1989	Richard Cohen	The Washington Post	"for his clear and controlled commentary on social and political topics."
1989	Michael Kinsley	United Feature Syndicate	"for informed commentary on a variety of national issues."
1990	Jim Murray	Los Angeles Times	"for his sports columns."
1990	Richard Cohen	The Washington Post	"for his columns on national issues."
1990	Walter Goodman	The New York Times	"for his columns about television."
1991	Jim Hoagland	The Washington Post	"for searching and prescient columns on events leading up to the Gulf War and on the political problems of Mikhail Gorbachev."
1991	Rheta Grimsley Johnson	The Commercial Appeal	"for her insightful columns on a variety of topics."
1991	Philip Terzian	The Providence Journal	"for his gracefully written columns about national and international events."
1991	William Woo	St. Louis Post-Dispatch	"for his thoughtful columns on local and national subjects."
1992	Anna Quindlen	The New York Times	"for her compelling columns on a wide range of personal and political topics."
1992	Liz Balmaseda	Miami Herald	"for her columns about local Cuban-Americans and the issues affecting the immigrant community."
1992	Robert Lipsyte	The New York Times	"for his insightful commentary on the world of sports."
1993	Liz Balmaseda	Miami Herald	"for her commentary from Haiti about deteriorating political and social conditions and her columns about Cuban-Americans in Miami."
1993	Betty DeRamus	The Detroit News	"for her columns about the problems and promise of urban America."
1993	Bill Johnson	The Orange County Register	"for his impressionistic accounts of his South Central Los Angeles neighborhood before and after the riots."
1994	William Raspberry	The Washington Post	"for his compelling commentaries on a variety of social and political topics."
1994	Jane Daugherty	Detroit Free Press	"for her 'Children First' columns, about issues affecting the youngest Americans.."
1994	Peter King	Los Angeles Times	"for his columns about California, filed from around the state."
1995	Jim Dwyer	Newsday	"for his compelling and compassionate columns about New York City."
1995	Paul Gigot	The Wall Street Journal	"for his insightful columns on Washington politics."
1995	Carl Rowan	Chicago Sun-Times	"for his columns disclosing corruption and mismanagement at the NAACP, which prompted reforms at the civil rights organization."
1996	E. R. Shipp	New York Daily News	"for her penetrating columns on race, welfare and other social issues."
1996	Dorothy Rabinowitz	The Wall Street Journal	"for her columns effectively challenging key cases of alleged child abuse."
1997	Eileen McNamara	The Boston Globe	"for her many-sided columns on Massachusetts people and issues."
1997	Tony Kornheiser	The Washington Post	"for his evocative columns ranging from sports and politics to tales of heroes and fools."
1997	Deborah Work	Sun Sentinel	"for speaking out in highly personal yet broadly relevant columns in roles as diverse as parent, citizen, critic and philosopher."
1998	Mike McAlary	New York Daily News	"for reporting on the brutalization of a Haitian immigrant by police officers at a Brooklyn stationhouse."
1998	Bob Greene	Chicago Tribune	"for his columns devoted to local children whose lives were mishandled by the welfare and judicial systems."
1998	Robert J. Samuelson	The Washington Post	"for his knowledgeable and analytical columns on a wide variety of national subjects."
1998	Patricia Smith	The Boston Globe	"for her lyrical and evocative columns on an assortment of urban topics."
1999	Maureen Dowd	The New York Times	"for her fresh and insightful columns on the impact of President Clinton's affair with Monica Lewinsky."
1999	Nat Hentoff	The Village Voice	"for his passionate columns championing free expression and individual rights."
1999	Donald Kaul	The Des Moines Register	"for his witty columns from Washington on politics and other national issues."
2000	Paul Gigot	The Wall Street Journal	"for his informative and insightful columns on politics and government."
2000	Michael Kelly	The Washington Post	"for his enlightening and entertaining observations on cultural and political issues."
2000	Colbert I. King	The Washington Post	"for his caring, persuasive columns addressing social and urban problems."
2001	Dorothy Rabinowitz	The Wall Street Journal	"for her articles on American society and culture."
2001	Karen Heller	The Philadelphia Inquirer	"for her humorous columns on modern life and popular culture."
2001	Derrick Z. Jackson	The Boston Globe	"for his perceptive, versatile columns on such subjects as politics, education and race."
2001	Trudy Rubin	The Philadelphia Inquirer	"for her keenly analytical columns on the Middle East."
2002	Thomas Friedman	The New York Times	"for his clarity of vision, based on extensive reporting, in commenting on the worldwide impact of the terrorist threat."
2002	Michael Daly	New York Daily News	"for his compassionate and humane columns, particularly those written after the terrorist attack on New York City."
2002	Nat Hentoff	The Village Voice	"for his persuasive and authoritative columns on the threats to American civil liberties following the September 11th terrorist attacks."
2003	Colbert I. King	The Washington Post	"for his against-the-grain columns that speak to people in power with ferocity and wisdom."
2003	Edward Achorn	The Providence Journal	"for his clear, tenacious call to action against government corruption in Rhode Island."
2003	Mark Holmberg	Richmond Times-Dispatch	"for his thought provoking, strongly reported columns on a broad range of topics."
2004	Leonard Pitts	Miami Herald	"for his fresh, vibrant columns that spoke, with both passion and compassion, to ordinary people on often divisive issues."
2004	Nicholas Kristof	The New York Times	"for his columns that, through rigorous reporting and powerful writing, often gave voice to forgotten people trapped in misery."
2004	Cynthia Tucker	The Atlanta Journal-Constitution	"for her forceful, persuasive columns that confronted sacred cows and hot topics with unswerving candor."
2005	Connie Schultz	The Plain Dealer	"for her pungent columns that provided a voice for the underdog and underprivileged."
2005	Nicholas Kristof	The New York Times	"for his powerful columns that portrayed suffering among the developing world's often forgotten people and stirred action."
2005	Tommy Tomlinson	The Charlotte Observer	"for his provocative columns with a wide-ranging human touch."
2006	Nicholas Kristof	The New York Times	"for his graphic, deeply reported columns that, at personal risk, focused attention on genocide in Darfur and that gave voice to the voiceless in other parts of the world."
2006	Chris Rose	The Times-Picayune	"for his vibrant and compassionate columns that gave voice to the afflictions of his city after it was struck by Hurricane Katrina."
2006	Cynthia Tucker	The Atlanta Journal-Constitution	"for her pungent, clear-eyed columns that tackled controversial issues with frankness and fortitude."
2007	Cynthia Tucker	The Atlanta Journal-Constitution	"for her courageous, clear-headed columns that evince a strong sense of morality and persuasive knowledge of the community."
2007	Ruth Marcus	The Washington Post	"for her intelligent and incisive commentary on a range of subjects, using a voice that can be serious or playful."
2007	Joe Nocera	The New York Times	"for his piercing, authoritative columns on business, often spotlighting misdeeds and flaws in corporate culture."
2008	Steven Pearlstein	The Washington Post	"for his insightful columns that explore the nation's complex economic ills with masterful clarity."
2008	Regina Brett	The Plain Dealer	"for her passionate columns on alienated teenagers in a dangerous city neighborhood."
2008	John Kass	Chicago Tribune	"for his hard-hitting columns on the abuse of local political power and a lively range of topics in a colorful city."
2009	Eugene Robinson	The Washington Post	"for his eloquent columns on the 2008 presidential campaign that focus on the election of the first African-American president, showcasing graceful writing and grasp of the larger historic picture."
2009	Regina Brett	The Plain Dealer	"for her range of compelling columns that move the heart, challenge authority and often trigger action while giving readers deeper insight into life's challenges."
2009	Paul Krugman	The New York Times	"for his prophetic columns on economic peril during a year of financial calamity, blending the scholarly knowledge of a distinguished economist with the skill of a wordsmith."
2010	Kathleen Parker	The Washington Post	"for her perceptive, often witty columns on an array of political and moral issues."
2010	David Leonhardt	The New York Times	"for his illumination of the nation's most pressing and complex economic concerns, from health care reform to the worst recession in decades."
2010	Phillip Morris	The Plain Dealer	"for his columns that close the distance between the reader and the rough streets of the city, confronting hard realities without leaving people to feel hopeless."
2011	David Leonhardt	The New York Times	"for his graceful penetration of America's complicated economic questions, from the federal budget deficit to health care reform."
2011	Phillip Morris	The Plain Dealer	"for his blend of local storytelling and unpredictable opinions, enlarging the discussion of controversial issues that stir a big city."
2011	Mary Schmich	Chicago Tribune	"for her versatile columns exploring life and the concerns of a metropolis with whimsy and poignancy."
2012	Mary Schmich	Chicago Tribune	"for her wide range of down-to-earth columns that reflect the character and capture the culture of her famed city."
2012	Nicholas Kristof	The New York Times	"for his valorous columns that transport readers into dangerous international scenes, from Egypt to Kenya to Cambodia, often focusing on the disenfranchised and always providing insight."
2012	Steve Lopez	Los Angeles Times	"for his engaging commentary on death and dying, marked by pieces on his own father's rapid physical and mental decline, that stir readers to address end-of-life questions."
2013	Bret Stephens	The Wall Street Journal	"for his incisive columns on American foreign policy and domestic politics, often enlivened by a contrarian twist."
2013	Mark Di Ionno	The Star-Ledger	"for his hard hitting columns on Hurricane Sandy, the death of a gay college student and other local events and issues."
2013	Juliette Kayyem	The Boston Globe	"for her colorful, well reported columns on an array of issues, from women in combat to oil drilling in Alaska."
2014	Stephen Henderson	Detroit Free Press	"for his columns on the financial crisis facing his hometown, written with passion and a stirring sense of place, sparing no one in their critique."
2014	Kevin Cullen	The Boston Globe	"for his street-wise local columns that capture the spirit of a city, especially after its famed marathon was devastated by terrorist bombings."
2014	Lisa Falkenberg	Houston Chronicle	"for her provocative metro columns written from the perspective of a sixth-generation Texan, often challenging the powerful and giving voice to the voiceless."
2015	Lisa Falkenberg	Houston Chronicle	"for vividly-written, groundbreaking columns about grand jury abuses that led to a wrongful conviction and other egregious problems in the legal and immigration systems."
2015	David Carr	The New York Times	"for columns on the media whose subjects range from threats to cable television's profit-making power to ISIS's use of modern media to menace its enemies." (Note: Posthumously.)
2015	Matthew Kaminski	The Wall Street Journal	"for columns from Ukraine, sometimes reported near heavy fighting, deepening readers' insights into the causes behind the conflict with Russia and the nature and motives of the people involved."
2016	Farah Stockman	The Boston Globe	"for extensively reported columns that probe the legacy of busing in Boston and its effect on education in the city with a clear eye on ongoing racial contradictions."
2016	Nicholas Kristof	The New York Times	"for courageously reported and deeply felt columns focused on the crisis of refugees from Syria and other war-torn regions."
2016	Steve Lopez	Los Angeles Times	"for richly nuanced columns written in an elegant voice illuminating huge inequalities in wealth and opportunity in contemporary Los Angeles."
2017	Peggy Noonan	The Wall Street Journal	"for rising to the moment with beautifully rendered columns that connected readers to the shared virtues of Americans during one of the nation's most divisive political campaigns."
2017	Dahleen Glanton	Chicago Tribune	"for bold, clear columns by a writer who cast aside sacred cows and conventional wisdom to speak powerfully and passionately about politics and race in Chicago and beyond."
2017	Trudy Rubin	The Philadelphia Inquirer	"for eloquent commentary written in world hotspots from Molenbeek near Brussels to the chancelleries of Beijing, reminding Americans of the importance of the foreign beat during a year when their tendency was to turn inward."
2018	John Archibald	Alabama Media Group	"for lyrical and courageous commentary that is rooted in Alabama but has a national resonance in scrutinizing corrupt politicians, championing the rights of women and calling out hypocrisy."
2018	Jelani Cobb	The New Yorker	"for combining masterful writing with a deep knowledge of history and a deft reporter's touch to bring context and clarity to the issue of race at a time when respectful dialogue on the subject often gives way to finger-pointing and derision."
2018	Steve Lopez	Los Angeles Times	"for graceful columns rich in detail that vividly illustrated how the crippling cost of housing in California is becoming an existential crisis for the state."
2019	Tony Messenger	St. Louis Post-Dispatch	"for bold columns that exposed the malfeasance and injustice of forcing poor rural Missourians charged with misdemeanor crimes to pay unaffordable fines or be sent to jail."
2019	Caitlin Flanagan	The Atlantic	"for luminous columns that expertly explore the intersection of gender and politics with a personal, yet keenly analytical, point of view."
2019	Melinda Henneberger	The Kansas City Star	"for examining, in spare and courageous writing, institutional sexism and misogyny within her hometown NFL team, her former governor's office and the Catholic Church."
2020	Nikole Hannah-Jones	The New York Times	"for a sweeping, deeply reported and personal essay for the ground-breaking 1619 Project, which seeks to place the enslavement of Africans at the center of America's story, prompting public conversation about the nation's founding and evolution."
2020	Sally Jenkins	The Washington Post	"for columns that marshal a broad knowledge of history and culture to remind the sports world of its responsibility to uphold basic values of equity, fairness and tolerance."
2020	Steve Lopez	Los Angeles Times	"for purposeful columns about rising homelessness in Los Angeles, which amplified calls for government action to deal with a long-visible public crisis."
2021	Michael Paul Williams	Richmond Times-Dispatch	"for penetrating and historically insightful columns that guided Richmond, a former capital of the Confederacy, through the painful and complicated process of dismantling the city's monuments to white supremacy."
2021	Melinda Henneberger	The Kansas City Star	"for tenacious and deeply reported columns on failures in the criminal justice system, forcefully arguing how systemic problems and abuses affect the larger community."
2021	Roy Johnson	Alabama Media Group	"for evocative columns on race and remembrance written with style, urgency, and moral clarity."
2022	Melinda Henneberger	The Kansas City Star	"for persuasive columns demanding justice for alleged victims of a retired police detective accused of being a sexual predator."
2022	Julian Aguon	The Atlantic	"for an illuminating essay that explores the familiar threats of climate change through the lesser-known stories of Indigenous Pacific Island communities who are fighting rising seas with a resilience that is both heartbreaking and hopeful."
2022	Zeynep Tufekci	The Atlantic	"for her insightful, often prescient, columns on the pandemic and American culture, published in The New York Times and The Atlantic, that brought clarity to the shifting official guidance and compelled us towards greater compassion and informed response."
2022	Zeynep Tufekci	The New York Times	"for her insightful, often prescient, columns on the pandemic and American culture, published in The New York Times and The Atlantic, that brought clarity to the shifting official guidance and compelled us towards greater compassion and informed response."
2023	Kyle Whitmire	Alabama Media Group	"for measured and persuasive columns that document how Alabama's Confederate heritage still colors the present with racism and exclusion, told through tours of its first capital, its mansions and monuments—and through the history that has been omitted."
2023	Xochitl Gonzalez	The Atlantic	"for thoughtful, versatile and entertaining columns that explore how gentrification and the predominant white culture in the U.S. stifle the physical and emotional expression of racial minorities." (Note: Moved by the Pulitzer board from the Criticism category.)
2023	Monica Hesse	The Washington Post	"for columns that convey the anger and dread that many Americans felt about losing their right to abortion after the Supreme Court overturned Roe v. Wade.
2024	Vladimir Kara-Murza	The Washington Post	"for passionate columns written under great personal risk from his prison cell, warning of the consequences of dissent in Vladimir Putin's Russia and insisting on a democratic future for his country."
2024	Jay Caspian Kang	The New Yorker	"for original columns that force us to reexamine popular narratives and reframe such critical topics as affirmative action, racial politics and the portrayal of gun violence."
2024	Brian Lyman	Alabama Reflector	"for brave, clear and pointed columns that challenge ever-more-repressive state policies flouting democratic norms and targeting vulnerable populations, written with the command and authority of a veteran political observer."
2025	Mosab Abu Toha	The New Yorker	"for essays on the physical and emotional carnage in Gaza that combine deep reporting with the intimacy of memoir to convey the Palestinian experience of more than a year and a half of war with Israel."
2025	Gustavo Arellano	Los Angeles Times	"for vivid columns reported from across the Southwest that shattered stereotypes and probed complex shifts in politics in an election year when Latinos were pivotal voters."
2025	Jerry Brewer	The Washington Post	"for his perceptive and informed use of sports to examine critical social divisions in America through difficult conversations about race, gender and media bias."
