= Grantham Prize =

The Grantham Prize was an annual journalism award awarded between September 2005 and October 2012. It was established by Jeremy Grantham and Hannelore Grantham and the Metcalf Institute for Marine and Environmental Reporting to annually recognize the work of one journalist or a team of journalists for exemplary reporting on the environment.

== Vision and objectives ==
"The public deserves ready access to the kind of information and news that only outstanding independent journalism can provide," the Granthams said in announcing the prize. They say they want their annual award of $75,000 to "give that kind of reporting the honor, respect, and visibility it needs."

The purpose of the Prize was to encourage outstanding coverage of the environment, to recognize reporting that has the potential to bring about constructive change, and to broadly disseminate the Prize-winning story to increase public awareness and understanding of issues focusing on the environment.

== Eligibility ==
The prize was awarded annually to non-fiction made available to a general audience in the United States or Canada during the previous calendar year in newspapers, magazines, books, television, cable, radio, or online.

Among the criteria jurors consider are the significance of the subject matter, quality and originality of the journalism, and the effort involved in telling the story.

== The Jury ==
The Grantham Prize entries was judged by an independent panel of jurors, chaired by David Boardman, Seattle Times. Other journalists on the jury included Robert B. Semple, Jr., The New York Times; James Hamilton, Charles S. Sydnor Professor of Public Policy at "Duke University"; Susanne Reber, Center for Investigative Reporting; Deborah Potter, NewsLab, Philip Meyer, Professor, emeritus professor at the University of North Carolina School of Journalism and Mass Communication and Diane Hawkins-Cox, formerly of CNN.

== Funding ==
The Grantham Prize was funded by Jeremy Grantham and Hannelore Grantham through The Grantham Foundation for the Protection of the Environment. The foundation seeks to raise awareness of urgent environmental issues and supports individuals and organizations working to find solutions. Their grantmaking supports communication and collaboration in environmental protection, with an emphasis on climate change.

== The metcalf institute ==
The Metcalf Institute for Marine and Environmental Reporting was established in 1997 with funding from three journalism foundations and the Belo Corporation, The Providence Journal Charitable Foundation, and the Philip L. Graham Fund, and also from the Telaka Foundation. The Institute was established as a memorial to Michael Metcalf, a visionary leader in newspaper journalism and, from 1979 to 1987, the Publisher of The Providence Journal Bulletin. The Metcalf Institute provides science and environmental science training for reporters and editors to help improve the accuracy and clarity of reporting on marine and environmental issues.

== Honorees ==
Grantham Prize

- 2012: Brandon Loomis, Rick Egan, & David Noyce, "Our Dying Forests", The Salt Lake Tribune
- 2011: James Astill, "The World's Lungs", The Economist, eight-part special report
- 2010: Alanna Mitchell, Sea Sick: The Global Ocean in Crisis
- 2009: Blake Morrison & Brad Heath, "The Smokestack Effect: Toxic Air and America's Schools", USA Today
- 2008: David Barboza, Keith Bradsher, Howard French, Joseph Kahn, Mark Landler, Chang W. Lee, Jimmy Wang, and Jim Yardley. "Choking on Growth", New York Times, ten-part series
- 2007: Kenneth R. Weiss and Usha Lee McFarling, "Altered Oceans", The Los Angeles Times, five-part series.
- 2006: Jan Barry, Thomas E. Franklin, Mary Jo Layton, Tim Nostrand, Alex Nussbaum, Tom Troncone, Debra Lynn Vial, Lindy Washburn, Barbara Williams, "Toxic Legacy", The Record (Bergen County, NJ)

== See also ==
- Environmental Media Awards
- Global 500 Roll of Honour
- Global Environmental Citizen Award
- Goldman Environmental Prize
- Heroes of the Environment
- Tyler Prize for Environmental Achievement
- List of environmental awards
