= Cannabis policy of the Carter administration =

During the administration of American President Jimmy Carter (1977–1981), the United States gave further consideration to the decriminalization of cannabis (marijuana), with the support of the president. However, law enforcement, conservative politicians, and grassroots parents' groups opposed this measure. The net result of the Carter administration was the continuation of the war on drugs and restrictions on cannabis, while at the same time cannabis consumption in the United States reached historically high levels.

== Campaign position ==
During his presidential campaign, Carter responded to a candidate survey by NORML, and stated that he was in favor of decriminalization of cannabis, as had recently been passed in Oregon in 1973.

== Presidency ==
In a 1977 address to Congress, Carter submitted that penalties for cannabis use should not outweigh the actual harms of cannabis consumption. Carter retained Nixon-era (yet pro-decriminalization) advisor Robert Du Pont, and appointed pro-decriminalization British physician Peter Bourne as his drug advisor (or "drug czar") to head up his newly-formed Office of Drug Abuse Policy.

=== Decriminalization ===
Six months into his administration, Carter was already speaking in support of decriminalization of cannabis, replacing imprisonment with civil fines, and removing federal penalties for possession of one ounce or less of cannabis. Carter supported softer enforcement regarding cannabis and cocaine, while maintaining a stricter stance against the perceived greater dangers of heroin.

=== Opposition ===
Carter's momentum on decriminalization was impeded by the discrediting of Bourne, leading to Bourne's resignation on 20 July, 1978. Bourne came under controversy concerning his efforts to maintain the confidentiality of one of his staff for whom he had written a prescription for methaqualone. Shortly thereafter, Bourne's alleged use of cannabis and cocaine (which Bourne had previously characterized as being "acutely pleasurable" in "The Great Cocaine Myth," a 1974 article for the Drugs and Drug Abuse Education Newsletter) at a party coinciding with the National Organization for the Reform of Marijuana Laws's annual convention was leaked to journalists Gary Cohn and Jack Anderson. NORML executive director Keith Stroup, upset about the Carter administration's continued use of paraquat on Mexican cannabis fields, said he "won't deny" that Bourne used the drugs and said that the refusal to deny was "significant." But he declined to elaborate. "I don't feel comfortable commenting about private drug use by a public person or anyone else," Stroup said.

Grassroots parents' organizations played a role in building popular opinion against cannabis decriminalization. The group Nosy Parents Association met with DuPont in 1977 and impressed upon him that youth cannabis usage was hurting students and families. Following this meeting, DuPont scaled back his support for decriminalization.

Carter was also opposed by conservative politicians. Ex-governor of California and future president Ronald Reagan used his syndicated weekly radio show to attack Carter for being soft on cannabis, and support stricter anti-cannabis policies.

Congress ultimately ignored Carter's support for decriminalization, alarmed by a sharp increase in the use of cocaine, and seeing cannabis as a gateway drug.

=== Compassionate Investigational New Drug program ===
The Compassionate Investigational New Drug program (Compassionate IND) was founded in 1978 by the Carter administration, providing federally-produced cannabis products to a limited number of assigned patients. The program was closed to new applicants in 1992 under the George H. W. Bush administration.

=== Drug War in Mexico ===
Carter spoke in favor of Mexico's program, funded by the United States, to eradicate cannabis in Mexico, stating: ""Marijuana happens to be an illicit drug that's included under the overall drug control program, and I favor this program very strongly."

=== Marijuana in the White House ===
In 1977, singer and songwriter Willie Nelson took a visit to the Carter White House. Nelson, a known pot-smoker says he was approached by Chip Carter, President Carter's son, during his visit. The story goes that Chip knocked on the rock & roll legend's door and took him on an excursion to the roof of the White House. On the roof, the two shared a "fat Austin torpedo" and took in the sights of Washington D.C. in the night.
