= Jack Nelson (journalist) =

American journalist (1929–2009)

- Born: John Howard Nelson; October 11, 1929; Talladega, Alabama, US
- Died: October 21, 2009 (aged 80); Bethesda, Maryland, US
- Occupation: Journalist
- Employer: Los Angeles Times

John Howard Nelson (October 11, 1929 – October 21, 2009) was an American journalist. He was praised for his coverage of the Watergate scandal, in particular, and he was described by New York Times editor Gene Roberts (Note: Gene Roberts was NYT Managing Editor from 1994 to 1997. In the 1960s he and Nelson had been coauthors of The Censors and the Schools (Little, Brown, 1963).) as "one of the most effective reporters in the civil rights era." He won a Pulitzer Prize in 1960.

== Youth ==
Nelson was born in Talladega, Alabama. His father ran a fruit store during the Great Depression. Nelson moved with his family to Georgia and eventually to Biloxi, Mississippi, where he graduated from Notre Dame High School in 1947.

== Early career ==
After graduating from high school Nelson began his journalism career with the Biloxi Daily Herald. There he earned the nickname 'Scoop' for his aggressive reporting. He then worked for the U.S. Army writing press releases before taking a job with the Atlanta Journal-Constitution in 1952. He won the Pulitzer for local reporting under deadline in 1960, citing "the excellent reporting in his series of articles on mental institutions in Georgia."

Nelson appeared on the CBS television program, I've Got a Secret, on the May 4, 1960 episode. His secret was “We all won Pulitzer Prizes this week.”

== Los Angeles Times ==
External videos
- Booknotes interview with Nelson on Terror in the Night: The Klan's Campaign Against the Jews, February 7, 1993, C-SPAN

Nelson joined the Los Angeles Times in 1965. He played an important role in uncovering the truth about the 1968 Orangeburg Massacre, where South Carolina Highway Patrol officers shot and killed African-American students protesting racial segregation in South Carolina. Nelson obtained the victims' medical records, which showed the police had shot some of the black students in the back of the head.

In 1970 he wrote a story about how the Federal Bureau of Investigation and local police in Meridian, Mississippi, shot two Ku Klux Klan members in a sting bankrolled by the local Jewish community. One of the Klan members, a woman, died in the ambush. FBI Director J. Edgar Hoover tried to kill the story, which appeared on the Los Angeles Times front page, by smearing Nelson, falsely, as an alcoholic.

In the early 1970s, Nelson led the LA Times's award-winning coverage of the Watergate scandal, and then served as the paper's Washington Bureau Chief for 21 years, from 1975 to 1996. During that period, he was a frequent guest on television and radio news programs.

== Works ==
- Jack Nelson, Scoop: The Evolution of a Southern Reporter (Jackson, MS: University Press of Mississippi, 2013)

== Death ==
Jack Nelson died of pancreatic cancer at his home in Bethesda, Maryland on October 21, 2009, ten days after his 80th birthday.

External videos
- Gridiron Club's Roast of Jack Nelson 29 March 1996, via C-SPAN
- Jack Nelson Memorial Service 14 November 2009, via C-SPAN
