= Carl Sagan Award for Public Appreciation of Science =

Science communication award

The Carl Sagan Award for Public Understanding of Science is an award presented by the Council of Scientific Society Presidents (CSSP) to individuals who have become “concurrently accomplished as researchers and/or educators, and as widely recognized magnifiers of the public's understanding of science.” The award was first presented in 1993 to astronomer Carl Sagan (1934–1996), who is also the award's namesake.

== Winners ==
- 1993: Carl Sagan, Laboratory for Planetary Studies, Cornell University
- 1994: E. O. Wilson, Curator, Museum of Comparative Zoology, Harvard University
- 1995: National Geographic Society and National Geographic Magazine: Gilbert Hovey Grosvenor and William Allen
- 1996: PBS Nova and Paula Apsell
- 1997: Bill Nye, Bill Nye the Science Guy
- 1998: Alan Alda, John Angier, Graham Chedd, PBS Scientific American Frontiers
- 1999: Richard Harris; Ira Flatow, National Public Radio
- 2000: John Rennie, Scientific American
- 2001: John Noble Wilford, "Science Times" of the New York Times
- 2002: Philip G. Zimbardo, PBS Discovering Psychology
- 2003: Island Press
- 2004: Popular Science
- 2005: Cheryl Heuton and Nicolas Falacci, creators of Numb3rs
- 2006: Court TV
- 2007: Kenneth R. Weiss and Usha Lee McFarling, Los Angeles Times
- 2009: Thomas Friedman, The New York Times
- 2010: Sylvia Earle, National Geographic Society
- 2013: Bassam Shakhashiri, American Chemical Society
- 2017: Charles Bolden, Former Administrator – National Aeronautics and Space Administration
- 2018: Steven Pinker
- 2019: William S. Hammack
