= Tony Messenger =

American columnist and Pulitzer Prize winner

Tony Messenger is a Pulitzer Prize-winning columnist for the St. Louis Post-Dispatch.

== Education and career ==
Messenger is a native of Littleton, Colorado, and attended Loyola University Chicago.

Messenger began his journalism career at the Yuma Pioneer in Yuma, Colorado. He moved to Missouri in 1999 and worked as a columnist and editor at the Columbia Daily Tribune until 2006. He was editorial page editor of the Springfield News-Leader until 2008.

In 2008, Messenger joined the Jefferson City bureau of the St. Louis Post-Dispatch as a capital correspondent and political columnist. He was named editorial page editor for the St. Louis Post-Dispatch in July 2012 and became a metro columnist in September 2016.

Messenger and colleague Kevin Horrigan were named finalists for the 2015 Pulitzer Prize for Commentary. They were cited "for editorials that brought insight and context to the national tragedy of Ferguson, MO, without losing sight of the community's needs."

In 2019, Messenger won the Pulitzer Prize for Commentary "for bold columns that exposed the malfeasance and injustice of forcing poor rural Missourians charged with misdemeanor crimes to pay unaffordable fines or be sent to jail."

Messenger's work has also been recognized by the Society of Professional Journalists, the American Society of New Editors and the Scripps Howard Foundation. In 2016 he was awarded the Missouri Honor Medal for Distinguished Service in Journalism by the University of Missouri School of Journalism.

== Awards ==
- 2019 Pulitzer Prize for Commentary
- 2016 Missouri Honor Medal for Distinguished Service in Journalism
- 2015 Finalist for Pulitzer Prize for Commentary (with Kevin Horrigan)
- 2014 Sigma Delta Chi Award for Editorial Writing
- 2014 American Society of News Editors Burl Osborne Editorial Leadership Award
- 2014 Scripps Howard Foundation Walker Stone Editorial writing Award (with Kevin Horrigan)
