= Usha Lee McFarling =

American science reporter

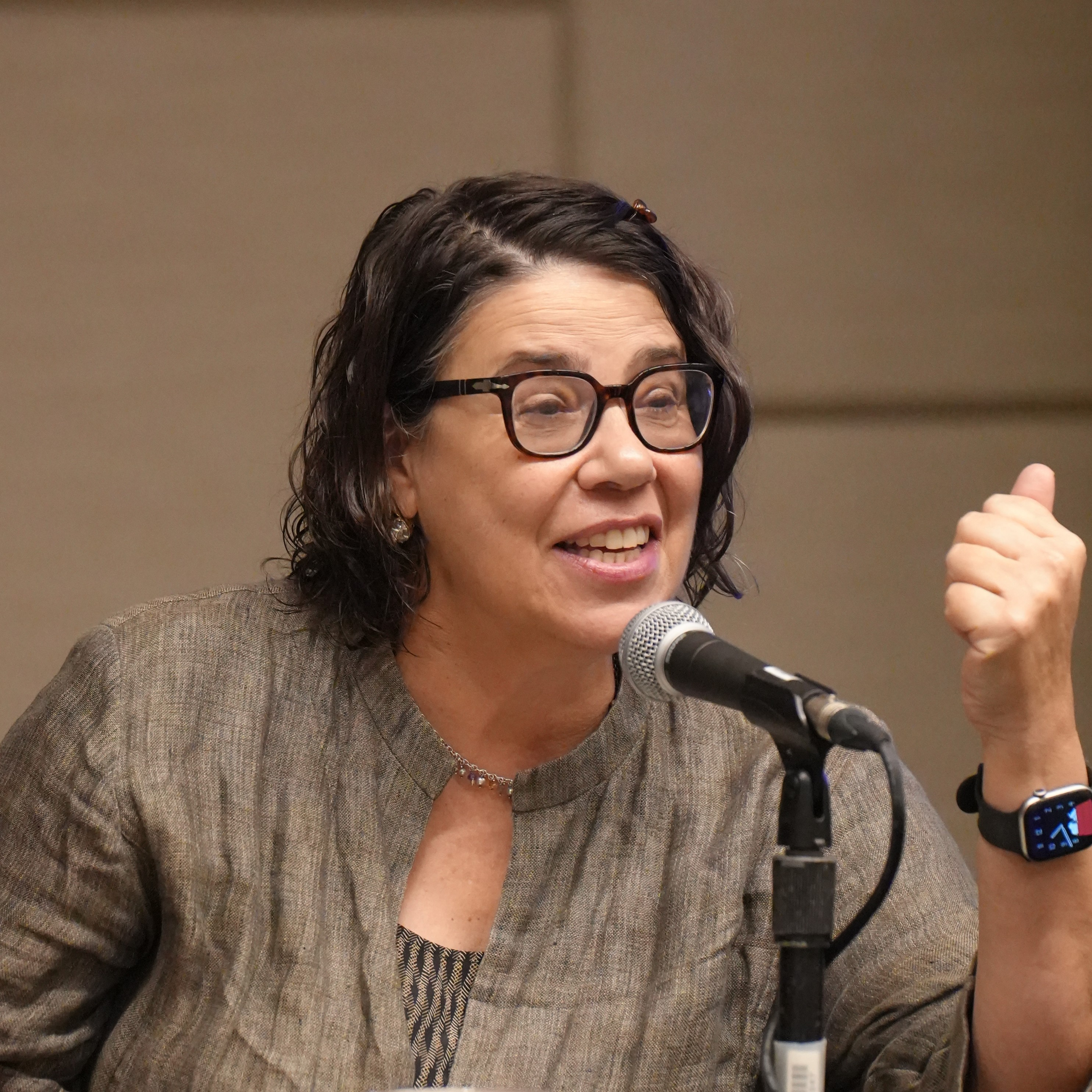
- McFarling in 2026
- Education: Brown University; University of California, Berkeley
- Occupation: science reporter
- Employer: Massachusetts Institute of Technology
- Awards: George Polk Award; Grantham Prize; American Geophysical Union Walter Sullivan Award for Excellence in Science Journalism; Carl Sagan Award for Public Understanding of Science; National Association of Science Writers Science in Society Award

Usha Lee McFarling is an American science reporter who is director of the Knight Science Journalism Fellowship program at MIT. She was formerly an Artist In Residence at the University of Washington Department of Communication. She won a 2007 Pulitzer Prize for Explanatory Reporting. University of Washington Department of Communication.

== Biography ==
McFarling was born in Germany to an Air Force family. She attended elementary school in Los Angeles. McFarling received a B.A. in biology from Brown University in 1989 (where she was a science reporter for the Brown Daily Herald) and an M.A. in biological psychology/animal behavior from the University of California, Berkeley in 1998. McFarling reported for Knight Ridder Washington Bureau, Boston Globe, and San Antonio Light prior to joining the Los Angeles Times, where she was a national science reporter. McFarling has reported on a wide variety of science news, including topics such as astrophysics, seismology, neuroscience, medicine, and climate change. McFarling joined Stat News as their Los Angeles correspondent in April 2016 and was named national science correspondent in 2021.

McFarling was a 1992 Knight Science Journalism Fellow at Massachusetts Institute of Technology (MIT). McFarling and fellow reporter Kenneth R. Weiss won several prizes for their five-part series "Altered Oceans" for the Los Angeles Times, including (with photojournalist Rick Loomis) the 2007 Pulitzer Prize for Explanatory Reporting for the same pieces. The citation read: "for their richly portrayed reports on the world's distressed oceans, telling the story in print and online, and stirring reaction among readers and officials." For the same series, McFarling and Weiss received the 2006 George Polk Award for Environmental Reporting, the 2007 Grantham Prize of the Grantham Foundation for the Protection of the Environment, the 2007 American Geophysical Union Walter Sullivan Award for Excellence in Science Journalism the 2007 Carl Sagan Award for Public Understanding of Science, and the National Association of Science Writers Science in Society Award. McFarling won first place in the beat category for her reporting for STAT on health disparities and structural racism. She showed how systematic racism exists at every level, from medical school admissions to faculty hiring in orthopedics.

In 2023, McFarling and Angus Chen were recognized for three stories on inequality in medicine for STAT with the national Edgar R. Murrow Award for excellence in diversity, equity and inclusion in the large digital news organization category.

In September, 2025, McFarling became director of the Knight Science Journalism Fellowship program at MIT, which offers paid academic-year fellowships to mid-career journalists from around the world.
