= Bill Hammack =

American chemical engineer

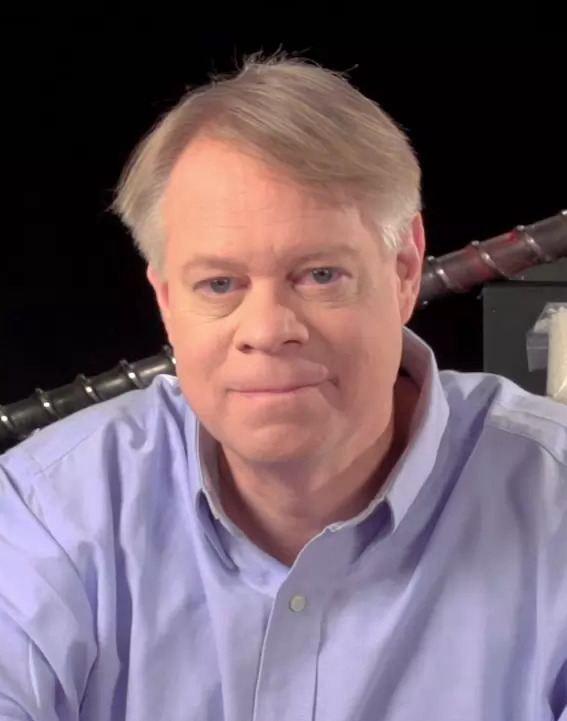
- Hammack in 2015
- Born: 1961 (age 64–65)
- Other name: engineerguy
- Education: Michigan Technological University (BS); University of Illinois, Urbana-Champaign (MS, PhD)
- Awards: Edwin F. Church Medal (2002) Carl Sagan Award for Public Appreciation of Science (2019)
- Scientific career
- Fields: Chemical engineering Biomolecular engineering
- Doctoral advisor: Harry George Drickamer
- Website: engineerguy.com

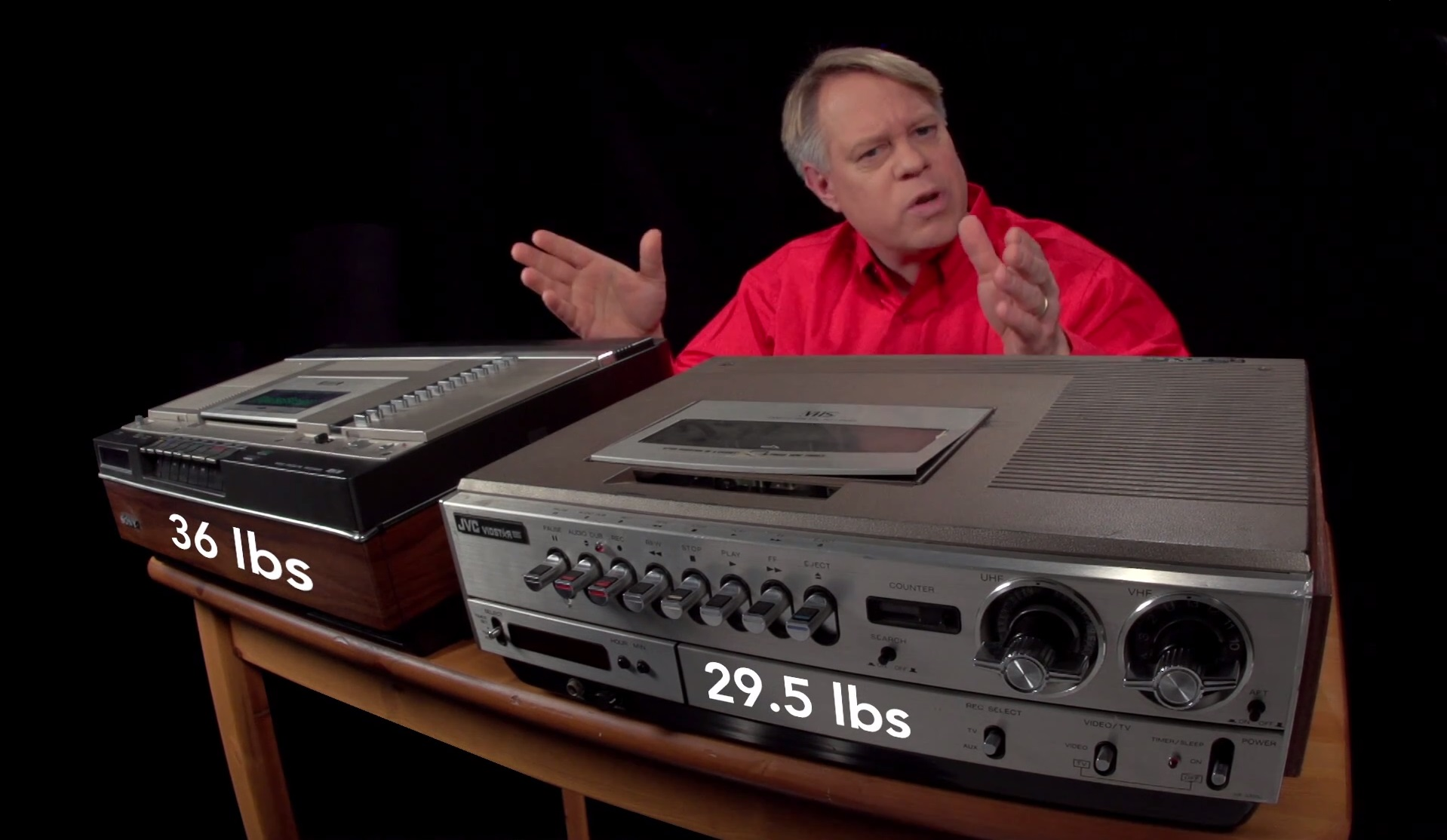
Bill Hammack explaining the difference between Betamax and VHS recorders

Video of Bill Hammack explaining how a film projector works

William (Bill) S. Hammack (born 1961) is an American chemical engineer, and professor in the department of chemical engineering at the University of Illinois at Urbana–Champaign.

Hammack is well known for his ventures in science communication as the persona Engineer Guy: between 1999 and 2005 he produced radio commentaries for Illinois Public Media, and starting in 2010, he produced a regular series of videos on YouTube explaining the engineering of everyday objects. He is one of the authors of the book Eight Amazing Engineering Stories. He also authored the book The Things We Make: The Unknown History of Invention from Cathedrals to Soda Cans, as well as the book Fatal Flight: The True Story of Britain's Last Great Airship, which was also recorded as an audiobook read by the author.

== Education ==
Hammack received his Ph.D. in chemical engineering in 1988 from University of Illinois, Urbana-Champaign under the guidance of Harry Drickamer. He completed his masters from the same university in 1986. Hammack's bachelor degree was from Michigan Technological University in the Upper Peninsula of Michigan. At Michigan he earned his B.S. in chemical engineering in 1984.

== Awards ==
In 2002, Hammack was awarded the Edwin F. Church Medal. In 2019, he was awarded with the Carl Sagan Award for Public Appreciation of Science.

- National Science Board Public Service Award (2021)

In 2022, Hammack was elected to the National Academy of Engineering.
