= Alissa J. Rubin =

American journalist

- Born: New York City, US
- Education: Brown University; Columbia University

Alissa Johannsen Rubin is a Pulitzer Prize–winning American journalist, and the Baghdad Bureau chief for The New York Times. She has spent much of her career covering the wars in Iraq, Afghanistan and the Balkans.

== Early life and education ==
Alissa Johannsen Rubin was born and raised in New York City. She attended Brown University, graduating in 1980 with a Bachelor of Arts degree in renaissance studies. She received a Mellon Fellowship to study at Columbia University, where she received her M.A. in 1986.

== Career ==
In 1997 Rubin joined the Los Angeles Times. With the paper, she covered Iraq, Afghanistan and, France, and the Balkans.

In August 2007, Rubin was named deputy bureau chief in the Baghdad bureau of The New York Times. In 2009, Rubin became the chief of The Times's bureau in Kabul, Afghanistan.

Rubin was seriously injured in a helicopter crash covering the war in northern Iraq on August 16, 2014. She suffered multiple fractures but was able to dictate a report of the accident. The crash killed the helicopter's pilot and injured others, including Vian Dakhil, a Yazidi member of the Council of Representatives of Iraq.

== Awards ==
Rubin won the 2016 Pulitzer Prize for International Reporting for "thoroughly reported and movingly written accounts giving voice to Afghan women who were forced to endure unspeakable cruelties."

In 2015, she won the John Chancellor Award from the Columbia Journalism School for her career of 35 years reporting on Iraq, Afghanistan and the Balkans.

Rubin won an Alicia Patterson Journalism Fellowship in 1992 writing about the reality versus politics of abortion in the 1990s.
