= Gary Cohn (journalist) =

American investigative reporter and academic (1952–2024)

- Born: March 9, 1952; New York City, U.S.
- Died: December 23, 2024 (aged 72); Los Angeles, California, U.S.
- Education: B.A., State University of New York, Buffalo
- Title: Freelance Journalist
- Awards: 1998 Pulitzer Prize Winner

Gary Cohn (March 9, 1952 – December 23, 2024) was an American Pulitzer Prize-winning investigative reporter and adjunct professor at the University of Southern California Annenberg School for Communication and Journalism.

Cohn won the 1998 Pulitzer Prize for Investigative Reporting, with Will Englund, while at The Baltimore Sun, and had been a Pulitzer finalist on two other occasions. Cohen had won numerous additional journalism awards, including the 1997 George Polk Award, and the Investigative Reporting & Editors (IRE) gold medal.

== Early life and education ==
Cohn was born on March 9, 1952, and was a native of Brooklyn, New York. He graduated summa cum laude from the State University of New York at Buffalo, with a BA in psychology and political science and studied law, for a year, at University of California, Berkeley.

He was Atwood Professor of Journalism at the University of Alaska Anchorage from 2001 to 2003 and taught, as an adjunct professor, in Journalism, at the University of Southern California Annenberg School of Journalism.

In October 2020, Cohn was awarded a McGraw Fellowship for Business Journalism, with Eric Pape, a fellow professor at the Annenberg School of Journalism. The prize was awarded so they could "look into the fast-growing anti-vaccine movement and its implications for people and science in the age of Covid-19."

== Career ==
Cohn reported for the Baltimore Sun, Philadelphia Inquirer, Los Angeles Times, Lexington Herald-Leader, Wall Street Journal, and for the columnist Jack Anderson in Washington. He worked as a freelance journalist from 2010, and his stories appeared in numerous publications and online sites such as the Huffington Post, Salon, Capital & Main, and Juvenile Justice Information Exchange.

in 1975, after a year of law school at the University of California, Cohn went to work as an investigator at the Southern Research Council. He also began working as a reporter for the columnist, Jack Anderson, who had been a target for assassination by senior staff of Richard Nixon administration. Cohn left in 1980 to work as a reporter for The Wall Street Journal and the Lexington Herald-Leader specializing in investigative reporting.

Cohn worked for The Philadelphia Inquirer from 1986 to 1993 before leaving to work under John Carroll of the Baltimore Sun, at a time when the Inquirer was struggling to keep from losing its staff. While at the Sun, Cohn and fellow journalist, Will Englund, won the Pulitzer Prize for Investigative Reporting under Carroll, having been given 18 months to travel and investigate the environmental dangers and hazardous conditions that shipbreakers faced in the mostly unregulated industry.

Cohn worked under Carroll again, from 2003 to 2007, at the Los Angeles Times, as an investigative reporter. He reported for a short time, in sports, before leaving to work as a Senior Writer for Bloomberg Markets, (2007–2008) where he won the Bartlett and Steele award with Darrell Preston.

== Death ==
Cohn died in Los Angeles on December 23, 2024, at the age of 72.

== Awards ==
Cohn won more than 30 prizes for journalism. Some of his awards are listed below.

- 1995 The Eric & Amy Burger Award from the Overseas Press Club for "Battalion 316," with Ginger Thompson, The Baltimore Sun, for reporting on the Honduran army unit responsible for political assassinations and torture and exposing the CIA involvement in support and training of the Honduran Army in the 1980s
- 1996 The Seldon Ring Award for "Battalion 316," with Ginger Thompson, The Baltimore Sun
- 1997 The George Polk Award for Environmental Reporting for "Shipbreakers," with Will Englund and Perry Thorsvik, The Baltimore Sun, for reporting on the hazardous conditions that shipbreakers faced due to lack of training and the effects on the environment.
- 1997 The Investigative Reporters and Editors Medal, for Newspapers – Circulation More Than 250,000, reporting on "Shipbreakers," with Will Englund, The Baltimore Sun.
- 1997 The Whitman Bassow Award from the Overseas Press Club for "Shipbreakers," with Will Englund and Perry Thorsvik, The Baltimore Sun
- 1998 the Seldon Ring Award for "Shipbreakers," with Will Englund, The Baltimore Sun
- 1998 The Pulitzer Prize for Investigative Reporting for "Shipbreakers," with Will Englund, The Baltimore Sun
- 2009 The Barlett & Steele Silver Award for "AARP's Stealth Fees," with Darrell Preston of Bloomberg Markets
