= Suzanne Daley =

American journalist

- Born: October 9, 1956 (age 70)
- Occupation: Journalist
- Notable credit: The New York Times
- Spouse: Donald McNeil Jr. (1980-2003)
- Partner: David E. McCraw (2008-present)
- Children: 2

Suzanne M. Daley is an American journalist who is the associate managing editor for international print for The New York Times. She was national editor from 2005 to 2010. In early 2010 she returned to reporting, with responsibility for special assignment feature writing across Europe.

== Career ==
Daley joined the Times in 1978 after graduating from Hampshire College.

Daley's posts at the Times have included:

- reporter, metropolitan desk (1982–94)
- deputy metropolitan editor (1994–95)
- South Africa bureau chief, based in Johannesburg (1995–99)
- Paris bureau chief (1999–2002)
- education editor (2002–2005)
- national editor (2005–2010)
- European correspondent (2010–2016)

== Personal ==
Daley was previously married to Donald G. McNeil Jr., then a science reporter for the Times. They have two daughters, Avery and Galen.

Her father Robert and grandfather Arthur were both sports writers for the Times. Her grandfather won a Pulitzer Prize for a Sports of the Times column in 1956.
