= Arthur Daley (sportswriter) =

Columnist for The New York Times

- Born: July 31, 1904; New York City, U.S.
- Died: January 3, 1974 (aged 69); New York City, U.S.
- Resting place: Gate of Heaven Cemetery
- Education: Fordham University, 1926
- Occupation: Sportswriter
- Spouse: Betty Daley
- Children: 4

Arthur John Daley (July 31, 1904 – January 3, 1974) was an American sports journalist. As a reporter and columnist, he wrote for The New York Times for almost fifty years. In 1956, he was awarded a Pulitzer Prize for reporting and commentary.

== Early life and education ==
Arthur Daley was born on July 31, 1904, in New York City. He attended Fordham Preparatory School and continued his education at Fordham University. He was a multifaceted athlete, participating in baseball, basketball, football, swimming, and track. He wrote for the university newspaper, The Fordham Ram, and served as its sports editor in his senior year.

== Career ==
After graduating in 1926, Daley was hired almost immediately as a field reporter for The New York Times, and for the rest of his life the newspaper would be "his one and only employer". Among his first major assignments was the 1927 heavyweight championship boxing match between Gene Tunney and Jack Dempsey – the infamous "Long Count Fight". He reported from the 1932 Summer Olympics in Los Angeles, and when he was chosen to repeat that role at the 1936 Olympics in Berlin, he became the first Times correspondent to be sent overseas for a sports assignment. In later years, Daley covered Olympics in Rome, Tokyo, Mexico City and Munich.

In 1942, he succeeded John Kieran as the sports columnist for the Times, a position he held for the next 32 years. As the daily writer of "Sports of The Times", he composed over 10,000 columns, with an estimated 20 million words. He also authored numerous books, including a collaboration with Kieran called The Story of the Olympic Games.

His writing earned him a Pulitzer Prize in 1956 for "outstanding coverage and commentary on the world of sports" in the category of "Local Reporting, No Edition Time". The National Sportscasters and Sportswriters Association named him "Sportswriter of the Year" in 1963, and inducted him into its Hall of Fame in 1976. Beginning in 1969, he served on the board of directors of the Pro Football Writers Association, and was a recipient of its Dick McCann Memorial Award. In 1972, he was inducted into the Fordham University Athletic Hall of Fame.

== Personal life ==
With his wife Betty, Daley lived in Old Greenwich, Connecticut; the couple had four children and fifteen grandchildren. A son, Robert, and a granddaughter, Suzanne, followed in Daley's footsteps by also working as writers for the Times.

Daley died of a heart attack on January 3, 1974, on West 42nd Street as he walked toward his Times Square office. With a crowd of sporting world celebrities in attendance, his Roman Catholic funeral Mass was held at St. Patrick's Cathedral. He is interred at Gate of Heaven Cemetery in Hawthorne, New York.

== Books ==
Daley was the author of several books, including

- The Story of the Olympic Games, with John Kieran (1941; r.1977)
- Times At Bat: A Half Century of Baseball (1950)
- Kings of the Home Run (1962)
- Pro Football's Hall of Fame (1965)
- Sports of the Times: the Arthur Daley years, collected columns (1975)
