= David Leonhardt =

American journalist and columnist (born 1973)

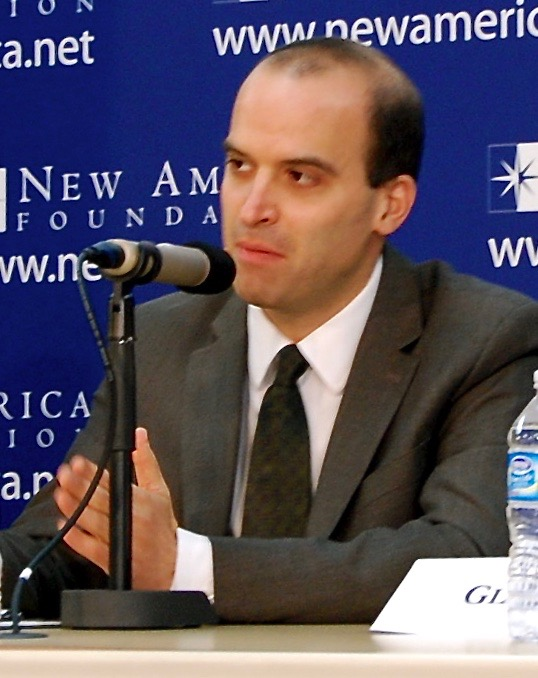
- Born: January 1, 1973 (age 53); New York City, New York, U.S.
- Education: Yale University (BS)
- Occupations: Journalist, columnist
- Employer: The New York Times
- Known for: Washington bureau chief, The New York Times (2011–2013)
- Awards: Pulitzer Prize for Commentary, 2011

David Leonhardt (born January 1, 1973) is an American journalist and columnist. Since April 30, 2020, he has written the daily "The Morning" newsletter for The New York Times. He also contributes to the paper's Sunday Review section. His column previously appeared weekly in The New York Times. He previously wrote the paper's daily e-mail newsletter, which bore his own name. As of October 2018, he also co-hosted "The Argument", a weekly opinion podcast with Ross Douthat and Michelle Goldberg.

Leonhardt was previously the head of an internal strategy group, known as the 2020 group, that made recommendations to Times executives in January 2017 about changing the newsroom and the news report in response to the rise of digital media. Prior to that, he was the managing editor of The Upshot, a then-new Times venture focusing on politics, policy, and economics, with an emphasis on data and graphics. Before The Upshot, he was the paper's Washington bureau chief and an economics columnist. He joined the Times in 1999 and wrote the "Economics Scene" column, and for the Times Sunday Magazine. He is the author of a short e-book published by the Times in February 2013: Here's the Deal: How Washington Can Solve the Deficit and Spur Growth. Before coming to the Times, he wrote for Business Week and The Washington Post.

In April 2011 he was awarded a Pulitzer Prize for Commentary "for his graceful penetration of America's complicated economic questions, from the federal budget deficit to health care reform".

== Early life and education ==
Leonhardt was born in Manhattan, the son of Joan (née Alexander) and Robert Leonhardt. His father was Jewish and his mother was Protestant. His father was the head of the French-American School of New York. Leonhardt graduated from Horace Mann School in Riverdale, New York, in 1990, and then continued his studies at Yale University, graduating in 1994 with a Bachelor of Science degree in applied mathematics. At Yale, Leonhardt served as editor-in-chief of the Yale Daily News.

== Career ==
In 1998, he won a Peter Lisagor Award for Exemplary Journalism in the Business Journalism category from the Chicago Headline Club for a Business Week story he wrote about problems at McDonald's. Leonhardt has been writing about economics for the Times since 2000. In 2004, he founded an analytical sports column, "Keeping Score," which ran on Sundays. He was one of the writers who produced the paper's 2005 series on social class in the United States. His economics column, "Economic Scene," appeared on Wednesdays from 2006 until 2011.

In 2003, he was part of a team of Times reporters whose coverage of corporate scandals was a finalist for the Pulitzer Prize. He won the Gerald Loeb Award for magazine writing in 2009 for a New York Times Magazine article, "Obamanomics." He was a winner of the Society of American Business Editors and Writers "Best in Business Journalism Contest" for his The New York Times column in 2009 and 2007. In 2010, he was a finalist for the Pulitzer Prize for Commentary for his economic columns. In 2011, he won the Pulitzer Prize for Commentary.

On July 22, 2011, Leonhardt was appointed chief of the Washington bureau of the Times. He began that editorial role on September 6, 2011. After this announcement, he published what he referred to as his final Economic Scene column, "Lessons from the Malaise," on July 26, 2011. However, after he began his editing assignment, Leonhardt continued publishing economic news analyses.

On November 20, 2013, it was announced that Leonhardt would step down as Washington Bureau Chief to become Managing Editor of a new Times "venture," later given the name "The Upshot," "which will be at the nexus of data and news and will produce clear analytical reporting and writing on opinion polls, economic indicators, politics, policy, education, and sports". The Upshot was created to fill the void of Nate Silver's departure from The New York Times.

In early 2016, it was announced that Leonhardt would be the head of an internal strategy group at the Times. In announcing the group, Dean Baquet, Executive Editor of the Times, wrote, "We need to develop a strategic plan for what The New York Times should be, and determine how to apply our timeless values to a new age." On January 17, 2017, Baquet released a report from the 2020 group with its recommendations. "The members of the 2020 group have emerged from this process both optimistic and anxious. We are optimistic, deeply so, because The Times is better positioned than any other media organization to deliver the coverage that millions of people are seeking," the report read. "But we must not fall prey to wishful thinking and believe that such an outcome is inevitable. It is not. We also face real challenges — journalism challenges and business challenges."

Leonhardt launched the NYTimes morning newsletter, The Morning, in May 2020. His newsletter originally focused on COVID-19 and attempted to find positive news, which some doctors and healthcare professionals argued helped minimize the pandemic and some of the mitigation responses.

=== Books and interviews ===
In February 2013, The New York Times and Byliner published a 15,000-word book by Leonhardt on the federal budget deficit and the importance of economic growth, titled Here's the Deal: How Washington Can Solve The Deficit and Spur Growth. The book is part of a new series of short e-books from the newspaper and Byliner. Matthew Yglesias, of Slate, wrote in a review of Here's the Deal: "if you're not a member of Congress and just want to understand the budgetary landscape on the merits, this is a great place to start." Ezra Klein, of The Washington Post, called the book "one of the calmest, clearest looks you'll find at the deficit — both what it is and how to fix it."

He was interviewed on The Colbert Report on January 6, 2009, about the gold standard. He was interviewed again on The Colbert Report on February 14, 2013, to speak about his new e-book.

In 2023, Leonhardt published Ours Was the Shining Future: The Story of the American Dream, which argued that since the mid-1970s, the American economic system had failed and that, unlike in previous generations, many 21st-century Americans could not expect to be economically better off than their parents.

== Awards ==
- 1998: Peter Lisagor Award for Exemplary Journalism, from the Chicago Headline Club.
- 2009: Gerald Loeb Award for Magazines
- 2010: Pulitzer Prize finalist, as a columnist.
- 2011: Pulitzer Prize winner, for commentary.
