= George Goodwin (journalist) =

George Evans Goodwin (June 20, 1917 – January 21, 2015) was an American journalist who won a Pulitzer Prize in 1948 for his work at The Atlanta Journal.

== Life, education, and career ==
Goodwin was born in Atlanta, Georgia. He graduated in 1939 with an A.B. degree and a certificate in journalism from Washington and Lee University in Lexington, Virginia. During World War II he served for three years in the United States Navy, including twenty months on operations as an intelligence officer. During his long career in journalism he reported for The Atlanta Journal and Atlanta Georgian (both of which James M. Cox had acquired in December 1939), the Washington Times-Herald and The Miami Daily News (another Cox property). The Georgia chapter of the Public Relations Society of America's annual award for volunteer service in named in his honor. An authority on public relations, Goodwin advised civic leaders including former Atlanta mayors Maynard Jackson and Shirley Franklin, as well as Ambassador Andrew Young. He had also been a Rotarian Senior Counselor. He died at the age of 97 on January 21, 2015.

== Pulitzer Prize ==
During the 1947 Three governors controversy in Georgia, a last-minute box of unexplained write-in votes for Herman Talmadge in the gubernatorial election from his home county Telfair made it possible for the Georgia legislature to elect him as successor to his father Eugene Talmadge (Note: The supreme court would later reject the theory and the election of the successor by the legislature in this situation outright.), who passed away before being sworn in as governor. Goodwin covered the fraudulent election in Telfair for The Atlanta Journal, after noticing that a surprising 34 of the 58 ballots in question were alphabetical in order. He won the next annual Pulitzer Prize for Local Reporting citing that work.
