= Edwin A. Roberts Jr. =

American journalist (1932–2019)

Edwin Albert Roberts Jr. (November 14, 1932 – August 8, 2019) was an American journalist. He won the 1974 Pulitzer Prize for Commentary.

== Life and career ==
Edwin Albert Roberts Jr. was born in Weehawken, New Jersey on November 14, 1932. He attended The College of William and Mary, and New York University. Roberts received an honorary degree from Saint Petersburg Junior College. He died in Tampa, Florida on August 8, 2019, at the age of 86.
