= Cynthia Tucker (journalist) =

American journalist

- Born: March 13, 1955 (age 71); Monroeville, Alabama, US
- Education: Auburn University
- Occupation: Syndicated columnist
- Known for: Commentary
- Children: 1
- Website: Tucker's political commentary at The Atlanta Journal-Constitution

Cynthia Tucker (born March 13, 1955) is an American journalist whose weekly column is syndicated by Universal Uclick. She received a Pulitzer Prize for Commentary in 2007 for her work at the Atlanta Journal-Constitution, where she served as editorial page editor. She was also a Pulitzer finalist in 2004 and 2006.

Tucker is on the board of jurors for the Peabody Awards.

== Early life and education ==
Tucker was born March 13, 1955, in Monroeville, Alabama, the daughter of Mary Louise Marshall Tucker, a high school English teacher, and John Tucker, a middle-school principal. She was born during the early years of the Civil Rights Movement, in an era of racial segregation; she did not attend an integrated school until she was 16. She attended Auburn University, where she majored in English and journalism and wrote for the student newspaper, The Auburn Plainsman.

== Career ==
After graduation in 1976, she began work for the Atlanta Journal-Constitution (AJC) as a reporter. In 1980, she left Atlanta and the AJC for a job at The Philadelphia Inquirer. Shortly thereafter, Tucker decided that she wanted to be a foreign correspondent in Africa, but the Inquirer considered her too inexperienced for the assignment. Tucker set out on her own, traveling around Africa and freelancing for six months. She then returned to Atlanta, where she was rehired as a columnist by the AJC.

Tucker was a Nieman Fellow by Harvard University in 1988. She was promoted to editorial page editor of the AJC in 1990.

Tucker blogged regularly and wrote two columns a week for both the print and web versions of the AJC. Her columns were syndicated to over 40 U.S. newspapers. Those columns earned her nominations for the Pulitzer Prize for commentary in 2004 and 2006 before her win in 2007. She is regarded as politically liberal.

In 2006, Tucker was named Journalist of the Year by the National Association of Black Journalists. In July 2009, Tucker moved to Washington, D.C., as the Atlanta Journal-Constitution's political columnist. She is also a columnist for The 74, a news website focusing on education in the United States.

In 2014, Tucker moved to Mobile, Al. She is currently Journalist-in-Residence at the University of South Alabama, where she teaches classes in communication and political science.

== Personal life ==
In 2008, Tucker adopted a baby girl, who is her only child.
