= Donald G. McNeil Jr. =

American science and health journalist

Donald McNeil Jr.
- Born: Donald Gerard McNeil Jr. February 1, 1954 (age 72); San Francisco, California, U.S.
- Education: University of California, Berkeley (BA)
- Occupation: Journalist
- Spouse: Suzanne Daley (m. 1980; div. 2003)
- Writing career
- Years active: 1976–present
- Subjects: Science and health reporting
- Notable work: Zika: The Emerging Epidemic (2016)

Donald Gerard McNeil Jr. (born February 1, 1954) is an American journalist. He was a science and health reporter for The New York Times where he reported on epidemics, including HIV/AIDS and the COVID-19 pandemic. His reporting on COVID-19 earned him widespread recognition for being one of the earliest and most prominent voices covering the pandemic.

In February 2021, McNeil resigned under pressure from The New York Times following reports that high-school students on a trip to Peru organized by the Times accused McNeil of making racially offensive remarks. After his resignation, McNeil published a lengthy response, disputing the high-school students' accusations and criticizing the Times.

== Early life and education ==
McNeil was born on February 1, 1954, in San Francisco. He graduated summa cum laude from the University of California, Berkeley, in 1975 with a bachelor's degree in rhetoric.

== Career ==
McNeil started at The New York Times in 1976 as a copy boy. He left in 1979 to teach journalism at Columbia University while studying history. In 1984, his play "Chip Shot" was produced off-off-Broadway by the Pan Asian Repertory Theater. From 1995 to 2002, he was a foreign correspondent based in South Africa and France. It was during this time that McNeil began covering HIV/AIDS and took an interest in vaccine-preventable diseases.

In 2002, McNeil joined the science staff of The New York Times and was assigned to cover global health. McNeil's later work on a series of stories about diseases on the brink of eradication was awarded the top prize by the Robert F. Kennedy Memorial Prize in Journalism in 2006.

In 2013, he was featured in an acclaimed documentary about AIDS drugs, Fire in the Blood.

In late 2015, McNeil began covering the outbreak of the Zika virus for The New York Times. He gained attention for his coverage of viral outbreaks.

During the COVID-19 pandemic, he became known for his early and persistent warnings about the severity of the situation. McNeil appeared on The Daily to discuss COVID-19 on February 27, 2020, marking him as one of the first to bring widespread attention to the COVID-19 virus in the United States. He also interviewed Dr. Anthony Fauci about Fauci's working relationship with President Donald Trump. His early coverage and acclaimed writing made him one of the prominent journalists covering COVID-19. He was the author of two of the fifteen articles about the coronavirus pandemic that won the 2021 Pulitzer Prize for Public Service for the Times.

=== Contract negotiations with The New York Times ===
McNeil was part of a brief walkout during contract negotiations between newsroom members of the Newspaper Guild of New York and the management of The New York Times. During negotiations on October 12, 2012, McNeil reported that 375 union members had walked out of the New York City offices and another 23 had walked out of the Washington D.C. newsroom. At the time, union members had been without a contract for 18 months and talks over pension payments were at a standstill. McNeil was joined by many other prominent reporters and editors in directing harsh criticism at the paper.

=== Dismissal from The New York Times ===
In 2019 McNeil accompanied a group of high school students on a New York Times sponsored trip to Peru. The purpose of the trip was for the students to learn about community-based healthcare in Peru. On January 28, 2021, The Daily Beast reported that multiple participants accused McNeil of repeatedly making racist and sexist remarks, including having used the word "nigger" in the context of discussing racist language, as well as "[using] stereotypes about Black teenagers". McNeil initially released a very short statement to The Washington Post, saying "Don't believe everything you read", which led to 150 Times employees signing an internal letter on February 3, demanding an apology from McNeil.

The New York Times said they had "disciplined Donald for statements and language that had been inappropriate and inconsistent with our values" after initial complaints in 2019, writing that the Times "found [McNeil] had used bad judgment by repeating a racist slur in the context of a conversation about racist language". On February 5, 2021, The New York Times announced that McNeil would be leaving. In the announcement McNeil apologized, saying that he had been "asked at dinner by a student whether [he] thought a classmate of hers should have been suspended for a video she had made as a 12-year-old in which she used a racial slur. To understand what was in the video, [he] asked if she had called someone else the slur or whether she was rapping or quoting a book title. In asking the question, [he] used the slur itself."

In March 2021, McNeil published an essay on Medium contesting the students' allegations and criticizing the Times' handling of his case. Describing his interactions with the high school students on the trip to Peru, McNeil wrote, "I thought I was generally arguing in favor of open-mindedness and tolerance — but it clearly didn't come across that way. And my bristliness makes me an imperfect pedagogue for sensitive teenagers."

=== Later career ===
In 2025, McNeil began writing occasional op-ed pieces for The Washington Post about Robert F. Kennedy Jr. and vaccine policy under the Trump administration.

== Personal life ==
McNeil was previously married to Suzanne Daley, also a journalist for the Times. He has two daughters.

== Books ==
- Zika: The Emerging Epidemic (2016, W. W. Norton & Company)
- The Wisdom of Plagues: Lessons from 25 Years of Covering Pandemics. Simon & Schuster. 2024. ISBN 9781668001394., favourably reviewed by the Lancet.

== Awards ==
- 2002 – First Place, International Reporting (Over 150,000), National Association of Black Journalists
- 2006 – Madeline Dane Ross Award, Overseas Press Club
- 2007 – Robert F. Kennedy Journalism Award
- 2012 – Third Place, Beat Reporting, Association of Health Care Journalists
- 2013 – Third Place, Beat Reporting, Association of Health Care Journalists
- 2020 – John Chancellor Award
