= Liz Balmaseda =

Cuban-American writer and journalist

Liz Balmaseda (born January 17, 1959) is a Cuban-American journalist who writes for The Palm Beach Post.

Balmaseda was born in Puerto Padre, Cuba, amidst the Cuban Revolution. Her family emigrated to the United States, and she grew up in Miami, Florida. She received an associate's degree from Miami Dade College, and then a bachelor's degree from Florida International University in communications in 1981. She had been an intern for the Miami Herald in 1980, and was hired upon her graduation in 1981 to write for El Herald, the Miami Herald's Spanish-language sister paper. She worked in this and several other reporting assignments at the Herald until 1985, when she left to become Central America bureau chief, based in El Salvador, for Newsweek. She moved to NBC News as a field producer based in Honduras before returning to the Miami Herald in November 1987 as a feature writer.

Balmaseda was awarded her first Pulitzer Prize for Commentary in 1993 for her writings on the plight of Cuban and Haitian refugees. Her second was awarded for breaking-news reporting in 2001, for her role in covering the story of Elián González. That same year, she won the Hispanic Heritage Award for Literature.
