= Mike Toner =

American journalist

Mike Toner is an American journalist who was awarded the 1993 Pulitzer Prize for Explanatory Journalism.

== Background ==
Toner was born in 1944 in Le Mars, Iowa, and grew up in northwest and north central Iowa. He lives in Atlanta, Georgia.

== Education ==
Toner attended Humboldt High School (Iowa), leaving in 1962. He received a B.A degree in journalism and mass communications from the University of Iowa in 1966 and participated in the University of Oklahoma H.H. Herbert School of Journalism field study in Peru in 1966. He received an M.S. from the Medill School of Journalism at Northwestern University in 1967. He was a professional journalism fellow at Stanford University in 1973.

== Professional ==
Toner worked as a photographer for The Daily Iowan from 1962 to 1966. He was a night desk editor for United Press International in Chicago in 1966. He was the Key West bureau chief for the Miami Herald in 1966 and a general assignment reporter, copy editor, assistant city editor and science/environment/aerospace reporter at the Herald from 1967 to 1984. He was the science editor for The Atlanta Journal-Constitution from 1984 to 1991 and a science writer for the newspaper there until he retired in 2004. He has written for American Archaeology, Archaeology, the Nation, Science Digest, Discover, National and International Wildlife magazines, Cure, and AARP:The Magazine.

His reporting is included in Bruce Garrison's "Professional Feature Writing" (1994), Bruce J. Evensen's The Responsible Reporter (1995), William David Sloan's Masterpieces of Reporting (1997) and in the National Association of Science Writers' A Field Guide for Science Writers (1997).

== Awards ==
In 1993 Toner won the Pulitzer Prize for Explanatory Journalism for a series of articles about antibiotic and pesticide resistance. The 10-part series, "When Bugs Fight Back", was published by the Atlanta Journal-Constitution in 1992. In 2001, Toner received the Gene S. Stuart Award from the Society for American Archaeology (SAA) for a two-year series of stories about archaeological looting and the international traffic in illicit antiquities. The series, "The Past in Peril", was published by The Atlanta Journal-Constitution in 2000 and 2001. The articles were republished in book form by the National Park Service's Southeast Archaeological Center in 2002. The SAA awarded Toner a second Gene S. Stuart award in 2012 for an article in American Archaeology magazine, "The Battle for the Dunkirk Schooner". The article was described by the SAA as "an ethically responsible and engaging view on the issues of antiquity ownership and the dangers of raising a shipwreck" that "brought an archaeological find and preservation issues to the attention of the public in a way all archaeologists can be proud of".
