= John Noble Wilford =

American journalist (1933–2025)

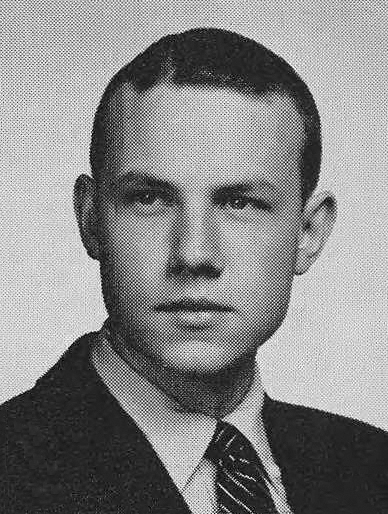
- University yearbook portrait, 1955
- Born: October 4, 1933; Murray, Kentucky, U.S.
- Died: December 8, 2025 (aged 92); Charlottesville, Virginia, U.S.
- Education: University of Tennessee, Syracuse University
- Occupations: Journalist, author
- Writing career
- Genre: Science journalism
- Notable awards: Pulitzer Prize (1984); Carl Sagan Award for Public Appreciation of Science (2001)

John Noble Wilford (October 4, 1933 – December 8, 2025) was an American author and science journalist for The New York Times. He wrote the front-page article in the Times about the Apollo 11 landing. Wilford was a Pulitzer Prize for National Reporting winner.

== Early life and career ==
Wilford was born October 4, 1933, in Murray, Kentucky, and attended Grove High School across the border in nearby Paris, Tennessee. After graduating from high school, he attended Lambuth College for a year before transferring to the University of Tennessee in the fall of 1952. He received a B.S. in journalism from UT in 1955 and an M.A. in political science from Syracuse University in 1956. After completing his master's degree, Wilford spent two years with the U.S. Army Counterintelligence Corps in West Germany.

Wilford's professional career began at The Commercial Appeal in Memphis, Tennessee, where he was a summer reporter in 1954 and 1955. He briefly served as a general assignment reporter at The Wall Street Journal in 1956. Following his military service, he was a medical reporter at the Journal from 1959 to 1961. In 1962, he held an Advanced International Reporting Fellowship at the Columbia University Graduate School of Journalism. That year, he also joined Time as a contributing editor specializing in science before moving in 1965 to The New York Times to be a science reporter (1965–1973) and science correspondent (1979–2008). While at the NYT he also worked as assistant national news editor (1973–1975) and director of science news (1975–1979).

In 1969, he wrote the newspaper's front-page article about the Apollo 11 landing. His was the only byline on the front page, beneath the headline "Men Walk On Moon" and under the subheading "A Powdery Surface is Closely Explored." On the 40th anniversary of the mission, Wilford's article was lauded by journalist Stephen Dubner, co-author of Freakonomics, who emphasized Wilford's skillful use of data. For example, Wilford wrote, "Although Mr. Armstrong is known as a man of few words, his heartbeats told of his excitement upon leading man's first landing on the moon. At the time of the descent rocket ignition, his heartbeat rate registered 110 a minute—77 is normal for him—and it shot up to 156 at touchdown." Dubner argues that this is one of the most elegant uses of data to have been ever used in journalism. His obituaries for Neil Armstrong and John Glenn were later published in the Times in the 2010s.

Wilford received the 1984 Pulitzer Prize for National Reporting for work on "scientific topics of national import". He also contributed to the staff entry that received a 1987 National Reporting Pulitzer for coverage of the Space Shuttle Challenger disaster and its implications. He has also won the G.M. Loeb Achievement Award from the University of Connecticut, the National Space Club Press Award and two awards from the Aviation-Space Writers Association. Wilford was recipient of the 2001 Carl Sagan Award for Public Appreciation of Science. He was the 2008 recipient of the University of Tennessee's Hileman Distinguished Alumni Award.

== Personal life and death ==
Wilford married twice; his first wife, Nancy Watts Paschall, died in 2015. He remarried to Janet St. Amant in 2018.

Wilford died from prostate cancer on December 8, 2025, at the age of 92.

== Bibliography ==
The following is a partial bibliography:

- Wilford, John Noble (1969).We Reach the Moon: The New York Times Story of Man's Greatest Adventure. New York: Bantam Books. OCLC 29123.ASIN B00005X54B
- The Mapmakers (1981, ISBN 0-394-46194-0)
- ‘’The_Mapmakers: Revised Edition’’ (2000,ISBN 0-375-40929-7)
- The Riddle of the Dinosaur (1985, ISBN 0-394-52763-1)
- Mars Beckons: The Mysteries, the Challenges, the Expectations of our Next Great Adventure in Space (1990, ISBN 0-394-58359-0)
- The Mysterious History of Columbus: An Exploration of the Man, the Myth, the Legacy (1991, ISBN 0-679-40476-7)
