= Politics Daily =

Former political news site

- Website type: Online political news daily
- Owner: AOL News
- Creator: Melinda Henneberger
- Website: http://www.politicsdaily.com
- Commercial: Yes
- Registration: No
- Launched: April 27, 2009
- Current status: Defunct

Politics Daily was an American political journalism web site launched by AOL News in April 2009. It described itself as a "political news magazine for the general reader." Melinda Henneberger, a former Newsweek and New York Times reporter, was Editor in Chief. Carl M. Cannon was the Executive Editor and senior Washington correspondent. Former Baltimore Sun reporter David Wood was chief military correspondent. Politics Daily columnist Jill Lawrence was a national political correspondent for USA Today. Washington Post columnist Donna Britt and Chicago Sun-Times reporter Lynn Sweet wrote for the web site. Bucking the general trend of layoffs in the media industry due to declining advertising revenue in the late-2000s recession, Politics Daily had hired 22 professional writers and journalists by the end of April 2009, with some reportedly earning salaries over US$100,000 annually.

On March 10, 2011, Melinda Henneberger and other top Politics Daily staffers were among 200 editorial employees laid off at AOL. It was later merged into The Huffington Post's Politics section.
