= Kenneth R. Weiss =

American journalist

- Born: May 28, 1957 (age 68); Covina, California, U.S.
- Education: B.A. in Folklore, University of California, Berkeley
- Occupation: Investigative journalist
- Employer: Los Angeles Times
- Notable work: Reporting on ocean degradation and global population issues
- Awards: Pulitzer Prize for Explanatory Reporting (2007); George Polk Award (2006); Grantham Prize (2007); Carl Sagan Award for Public Understanding of Science (2007)

Kenneth R. Weiss (born May 28, 1957) is an investigative journalist for the Los Angeles Times.

Weiss was born in Covina, California, and he graduated from University of California, Berkeley in 1981 with a B.A. in Folklore. There he was editor-in-chief for the college newspaper, The Daily Californian, during his senior year.

Weiss, reporter Usha Lee McFarling, and photographer Rick Loomis of the L.A. Times shared the Pulitzer Prize for Explanatory Reporting in 2007, citing "their richly portrayed reports on the world's distressed oceans, telling the story in print and online, and stirring reaction among readers and officials."

== Awards ==
- 2006 George Polk Award
- 2007 Pulitzer Prize for Explanatory Reporting
- 2007 Grantham Prize Winner
- 2007 Carl Sagan Award for Public Understanding of Science

== Selected works ==
- "Fish Farms Become Feedlots of the Sea", The Los Angeles Times, KENNETH R WEISS, 9 December 2002
- "Bush to Protect Island Waters ", The Los Angeles Times, June 15, 2006
- "Cruise Line Pollution Prompts Legislation", The Los Angeles Times, KENNETH R WEISS, 18 August 2003
- "The rise of slime", The New Internationalist, January 2007, Issue 397
- "Beyond 7 billion""Five Part Series on Challenges Posed by Rising World Population] The Los Angeles Times, KENNETH R WEISS, 22 July 2012
