= The Race Beat =

2006 book by Gene Roberts and Hank Klibanoff

- Author: Gene Roberts and Hank Klibanoff
- Genre: Non-fiction
- Publisher: Knopf
- Publication date: October 31, 2006
- Pages: 528
- ISBN: 0-679-40381-7 (hardcover)
- OCLC: 66393706

The Race Beat: The Press, the Civil Rights Struggle, and the Awakening of a Nation is a 2006 nonfiction book by journalists Gene Roberts and Hank Klibanoff. The book is about the Civil Rights Movement in the United States, specifically about the role of newspapers and television. Roberts was familiar with the Civil Rights Movement based on his journalism for the New York Times, and similarly Klibanoff from his work with the Atlanta Journal-Constitution. Roberts and Klibanoff's book brings to light the impact national journalists had on the march towards passage of the Civil Rights and Voting Rights Acts, respectively.

The Race Beat centers on how groups and organizations arranged legal protests as a means to ignite enough violence that would be newsworthy. Once seen as sympathetic in the news, the thought was that powerful third parties would side with the protesters and change the political conversation in order to change discriminatory laws. A quote from Civil Rights icon John Lewis in 2005 sums up the book's thesis well: “If it hadn’t been for the media—the print media and television—the civil rights movement would have been like a bird without wings, a choir without a song."

Roberts and Klibanoff start their story in the 1940s, explaining that one of the main reasons segregation persisted in the South was because the media refused to cover it. The book notes that changes in the way Civil Rights were covered in the media came after the 1955 murder of black teenager, Emmett Till, in Mississippi. Roberts and Klibanoff cite Little Rock as "a turning point in how the gathering racial storm was presented to the American people and the world."

The authors focused mainly on the first half of the 1960's, prior to the passage of the significant Civil Rights acts.

The Race Beat refers to reporters whose beat reporting covered issues of race.

The book received the 2007 Pulitzer Prize for History.

It was necessary reading for the University Interscholastic League's Social Studies Competition in 2019.
