= The Atlanta Journal-Constitution =

Daily digital newspaper in Atlanta, Georgia

- Front page of The Atlanta Journal-Constitution from January 27, 2024
- Type: Online newspaper
- Format: Digital
- Owner: Cox Enterprises
- Publisher: Andrew Morse
- Editor: Leroy Chapman
- Founded: Constitution: 1868; 158 years ago; Journal: 1883; Journal-Constitution: 1960 (Sundays); 1976 (Saturday–Sunday); 2001 (Every day; merger of weekday morning Constitution and afternoon Journal)
- Ceased publication: December 31, 2025 (print)
- Headquarters: Midtown Atlanta, Georgia, U.S.
- Circulation: 100,000 (digital subscriptions)
- ISSN: 1539-7459
- OCLC number: 48488341
- Website: ajc.com

Logo until 2021

Logo in 2005

Logo of The Atlanta Constitution in 2001

The Atlanta Journal-Constitution (sometimes known as The AJC) is an American online newspaper based in Atlanta, Georgia. It is the flagship publication of Cox Enterprises. The Atlanta Journal-Constitution is the result of the merger between The Atlanta Journal and The Atlanta Constitution. The two staffs were combined in 1982. Separate publication of the morning Constitution and the afternoon Journal ended in 2001 in favor of a single morning paper under the Journal-Constitution name.

The Atlanta Journal-Constitution has its headquarters in Midtown Atlanta. It was formerly co-owned with television flagship WSB-TV and six radio stations, which are located separately in Midtown Atlanta; the newspaper remained part of Cox Enterprises, while WSB became part of an independent Cox Media Group.

The Atlanta Journal-Constitution published its last print edition on December 31, 2025, and moved to a digital-only online newspaper.

== The Atlanta Constitution ==
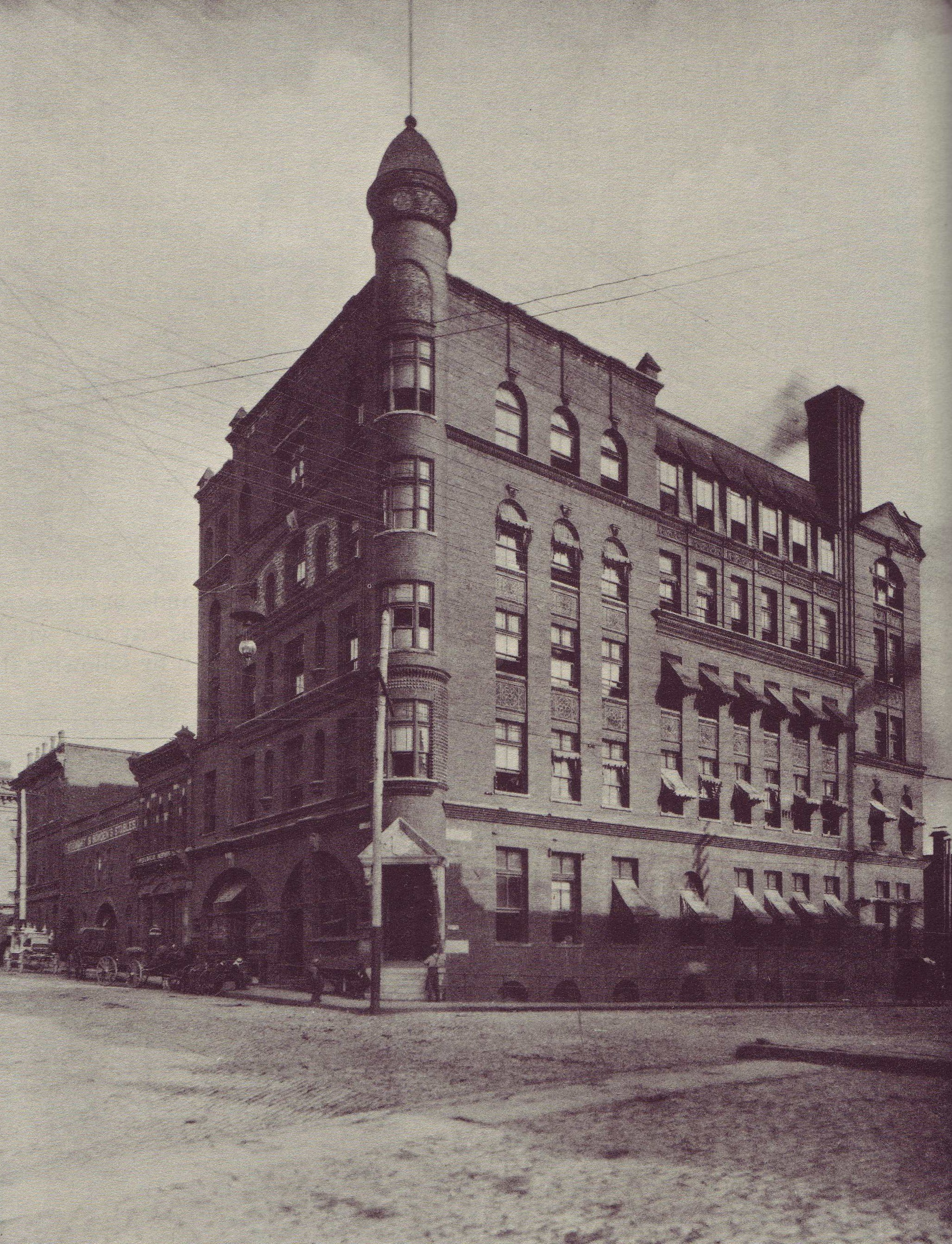
Constitution building, 1890

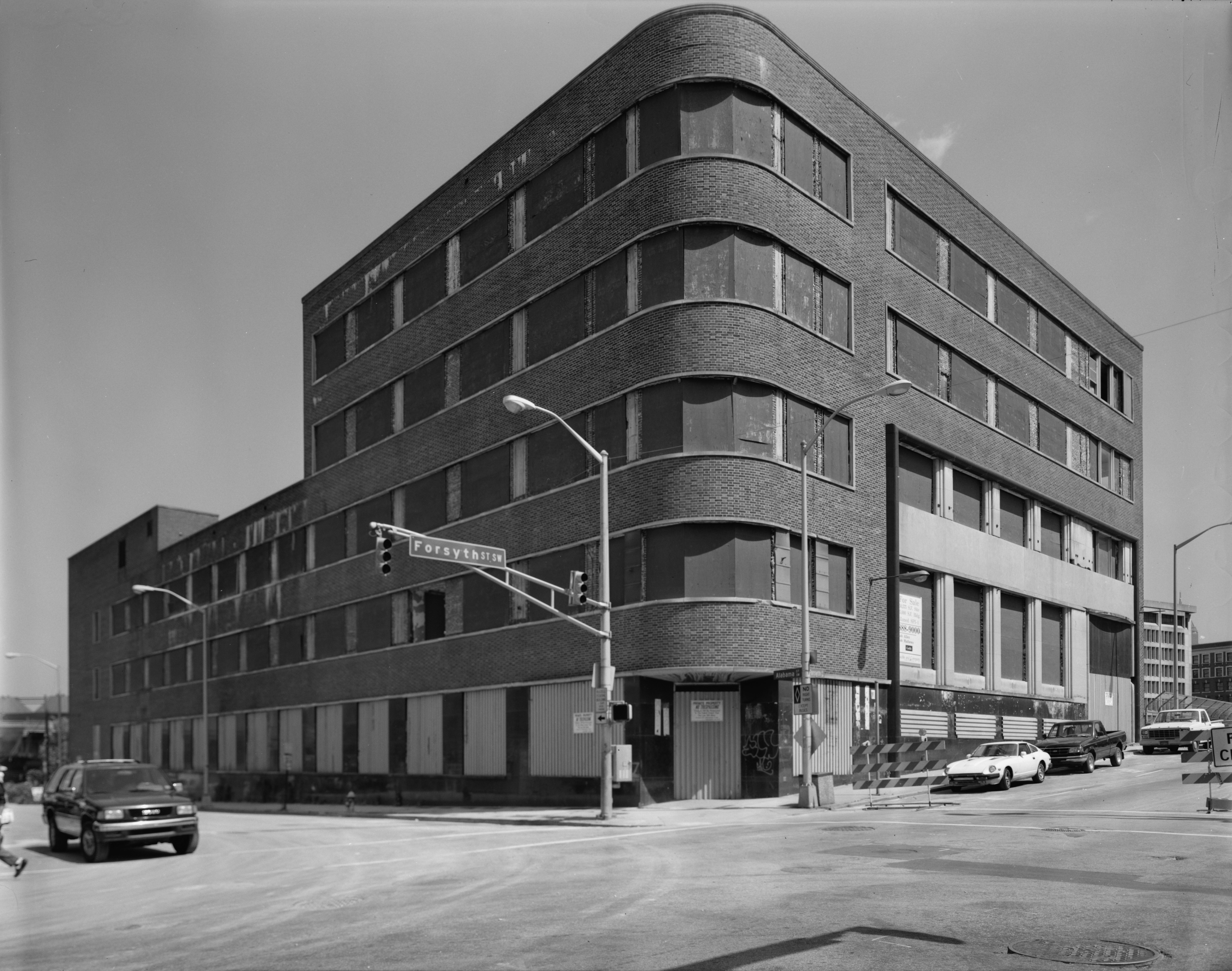
Atlanta Constitution Building, in abandoned state, 1995. Historic American Buildings Survey image.

In 1868, Carey Wentworth Styles, along with his joint venture partners James Anderson and (future Atlanta mayor) William Hemphill purchased a small newspaper, the Atlanta Daily Opinion, which they renamed The Constitution, as it was originally known, was first published on June 16, 1868. Its name changed to The Atlanta Constitution in October 1869. Hemphill became the business manager, a position he retained until 1901. When Styles was unable to liquidate his holdings in an Albany newspaper, he could not pay for his purchase of the Constitution. He was forced to surrender his interest in the paper to Anderson and Hemphill, who each owned one half. In 1870, Anderson sold his one-half interest in the paper to Col. E. Y. Clarke. In active competition with other Atlanta newspapers, Hemphill hired special trains (one engine and car) to deliver newspapers to the Macon marketplace. The newspaper became such a force that by 1871 it had overwhelmed the Daily Intelligencer, the only Atlanta paper to survive the American Civil War. In August 1875, its name was changed to The Atlanta Daily Constitution for two weeks, then to The Constitution again for about a year. In 1876, Captain Evan Howell (a former Intelligencer city editor) purchased the 50 percent interest in the paper from E. Y. Clarke and became its editor-in-chief. That same year, Joel Chandler Harris began writing for the paper. He soon created the character of Uncle Remus, a black storyteller, to recount stories from African-American culture. The Howell family eventually owned full interest in the paper from 1902 until 1950.

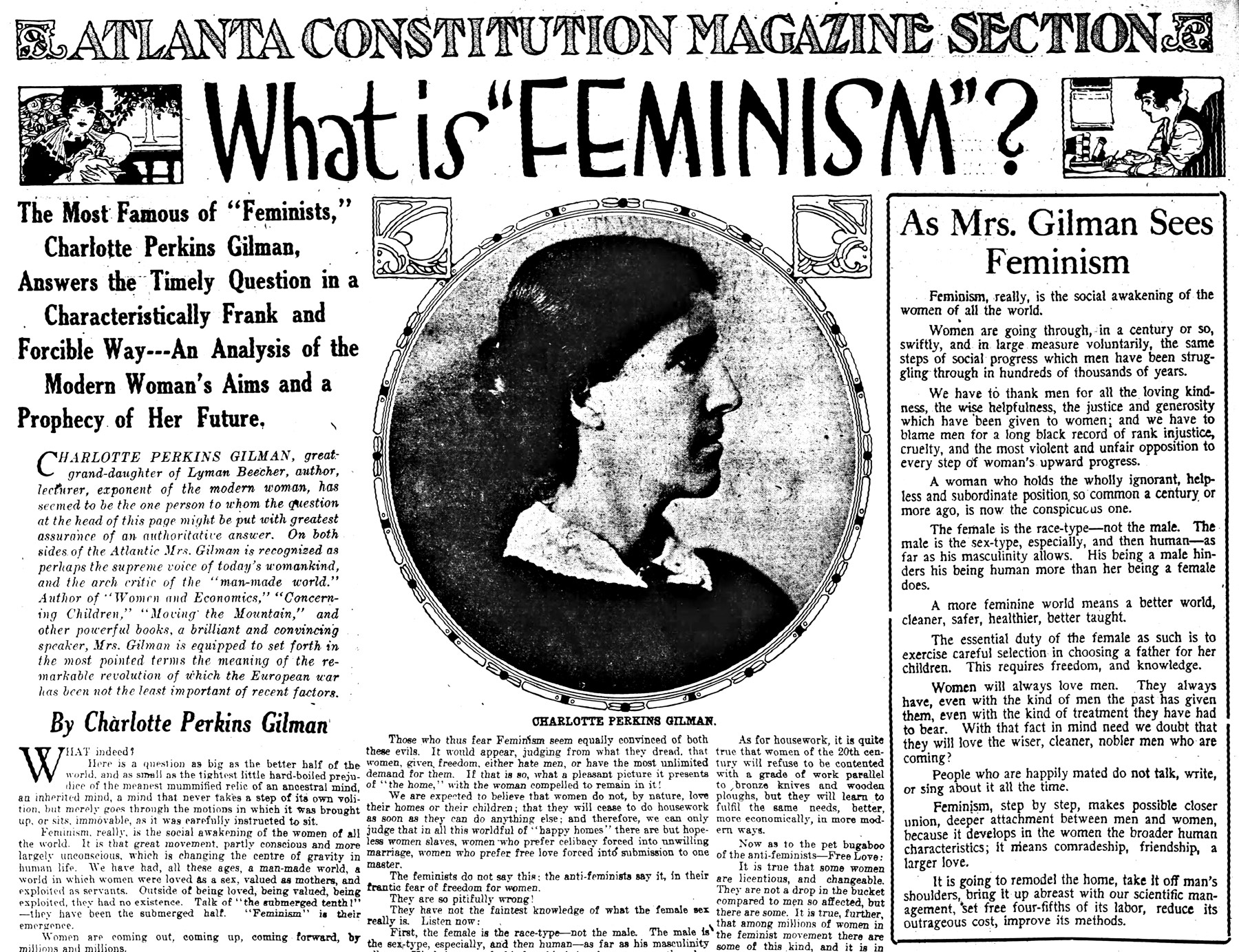
Charlotte Perkins Gilman (pictured) wrote these articles about feminism for the Atlanta Constitution, published on December 10, 1916.

In October 1876, the newspaper was renamed The Daily Constitution before settling on the name The Atlanta Constitution in September 1881. During the 1880s, editor Henry W. Grady was a spokesman for the "New South", encouraging industrial development as well as the founding of Georgia Tech in Atlanta. Evan Howell's family would come to own The Atlanta Constitution from 1902 to 1950.

The Constitution established one of the first radio broadcasting stations, WGM, which began operating on March 17, 1922, two days after the debut of the Journal's WSB. However, WGM ceased operations after just over a year. Its equipment was donated to what was then known as Georgia School of Technology, which used it to help launch WBBF (later WGST, now WGKA AM 920) in January 1924.

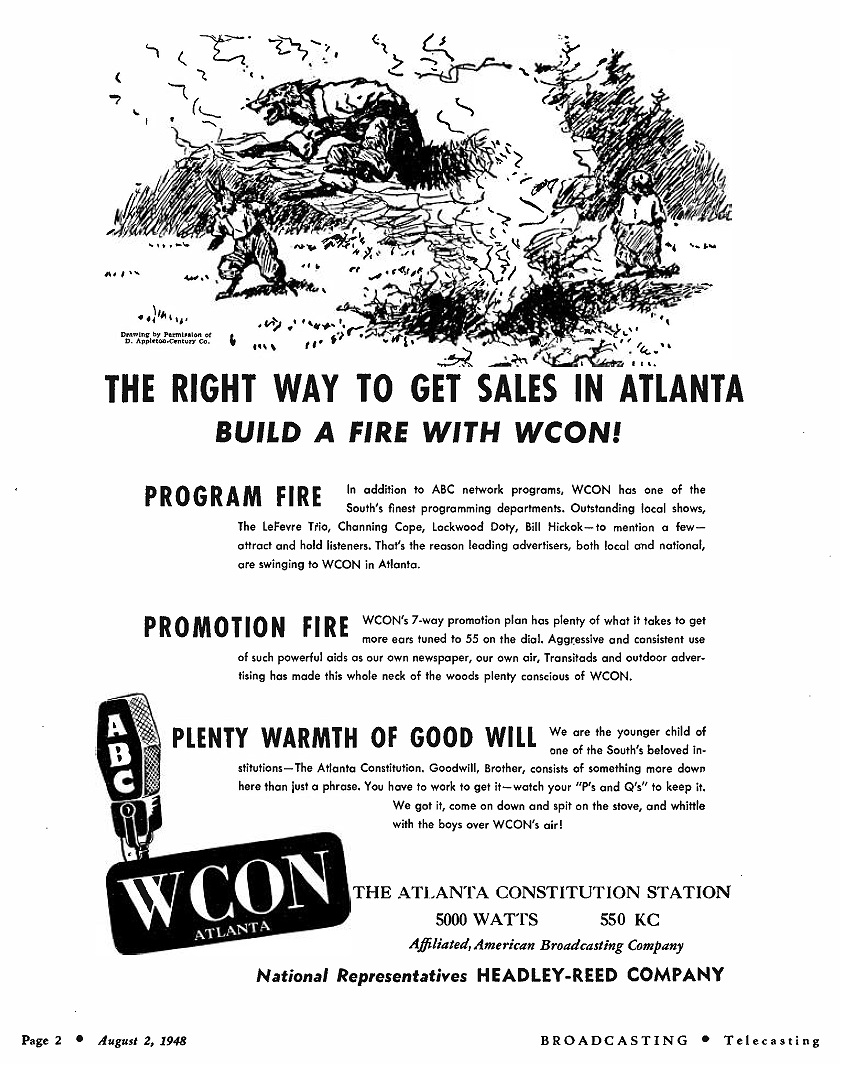
1948 advertisement for the Constitution's AM radio station WCON

In late 1947, the Constitution established radio station WCON (AM 550). Subsequently, it received approval to operate an FM station, WCON-FM 98.5 mHz, and a TV station, WCON-TV, on channel 2.

But the 1950 merger with the Journal required major adjustments. Contemporary Federal Communications Commission "duopoly" regulations disallowed owning more than one AM, FM, or TV station in a given market, and the Atlanta Journal already owned WSB AM 750 and WSB-FM 104.5, as well as WSB-TV on channel 8. WCON and the original WSB-FM were shut down to comply with the duopoly restrictions. The WCON-TV construction permit was canceled, and WSB-TV was allowed to move from channel 8 to channel 2. To standardize with its sister stations, WCON-FM's call letters were changed to WSB-FM.

Ralph McGill, editor for the Constitution in the 1940s, was one of the few southern newspaper editors to support the American Civil Rights Movement. Other noteworthy editors of The Atlanta Constitution include J. Reginald Murphy. "Reg" Murphy gained notoriety after being kidnapped in 1974. Murphy later moved to the West Coast and served as editor of the San Francisco Examiner.

Celestine Sibley was an award-winning reporter, editor, and beloved columnist for the Constitution from 1941 to 1999 and wrote 25 fiction and nonfiction books about Southern life. After her death, the Georgia House of Representatives named its press gallery in her honor as a mark of affection and respect.

From the 1970s until he died in 1994, Lewis Grizzard was a popular humor columnist for the Constitution. He portrayed Southern "redneck" culture with a mixture of ridicule and respect.

The Constitution won numerous Pulitzer Prizes. In 1931, it won a Pulitzer Prize for Public Service for exposing corruption at the local level. In 1959, The Constitution won a Pulitzer Prize for Editorial Writing for Ralph McGill's editorial "A Church, A School..." In 1967, it was awarded another Pulitzer Prize for Eugene Patterson's editorials. (Patterson later left his post as editor over a dispute over an op-ed piece.) In 1960, Jack Nelson won the Pulitzer Prize for local reporting by exposing abuses at Milledgeville State Hospital for the mentally ill.

The papers were published in independent editions even after newsrooms were combined in 1982. In 1988 the Pulitzer Prize for Editorial Cartooning went to the Constitution's Doug Marlette. Editorial cartoonist Mike Luckovich received Pulitzer Prizes in 1995 and 2006. Cynthia Tucker received a 2007 Pulitzer Prize for Commentary.

== The Atlanta Journal ==
The Atlanta Journal was established in 1883. Founder E. F. Hoge sold the paper to Atlanta lawyer Hoke Smith in 1887. After the Journal supported presidential candidate Grover Cleveland in the 1892 election, Smith was named as Secretary of the Interior by the victorious Cleveland. As a successful candidate in the 1906 Georgia gubernatorial election, Smith campaigned for Black disfranchisement, calling the races "different, radically different" and supporting separate taxes for Black and white schools calling it "folly to spend the money of white men to give negroes a book education." Smith's demagogic diatribes on behalf of white supremacy in the election, and a series of articles alleging rapes by Blacks, are considered a primary cause of the 1906 Atlanta Race Riot. Violent attacks by armed mobs of Whites against Blacks in Atlanta began after his Journal published several unsubstantiated and luridly detailed reports of the alleged rapes of four white local women by black men. The final death toll of the conflict is unknown and disputed, but officially at least 25 African Americans and two Whites died. Unofficial reports ranged from 10 to 100 black Americans killed during the massacre.

Reacting to the Atlanta Race Riot, The New York Times reported on September 28, 1906,

The Fulton County Grand Jury today made the following presentment:

"Believing that the sensational manner in which the afternoon newspapers of Atlanta have presented to the people the news of the various criminal acts recently committed in this county has largely influenced the creation of the spirit animating the mob of last Saturday night; and that the editorial utterances of The Atlanta News for some time past have been calculated to create a disregard for the proper administration of the law and to promote the organization of citizens to act outside of the law in the punishment of crime;

...Resolved, That the sensationalism of the afternoon papers in the presentation of the criminal news to the public prior to the riots of Saturday night... deserves our severest condemnation..."

Pulitzer Prize-winning novelist Margaret Mitchell worked for the Journal from 1922 to 1926. Essential for the development of her 1936 Gone with the Wind was the series of profiles of prominent Georgia Civil War generals she wrote for The Atlanta Journal's Sunday magazine, the research for which, scholars believe, led her to her work on the novel.

In 1922, the Journal founded one of the first radio broadcasting stations in the South, WSB.

The radio station and the newspaper were sold in 1939 to James Middleton Cox, founder of Cox Enterprises.

The Journal carried the motto "Covers Dixie like the Dew".

== Merger ==
Cox Enterprises bought the Constitution in June 1950, bringing both newspapers under one ownership and combining sales and administrative offices. Separate newsrooms were kept until 1982. Both newspapers continued to be published for another two decades, with much of the same content except for timely editing. The Journal, an afternoon paper, led the morning Constitution until the 1970s when afternoon papers began to fall out of favor with subscribers. In November 2001, the two papers, once fierce competitors, merged to produce one daily morning paper, The Atlanta Journal-Constitution. The two papers had published a combined edition on weekends and holidays for years previously.

Before the merger, both papers planned to start TV stations: WSB-TV on channel 8 for the Journal, and WCON-TV on channel 2 for the Constitution. Only WSB got on the air, beginning in 1948 as the first TV station in the Deep South. It moved from channel 8 to WCON's allotment on channel 2 in 1951 to avoid TV interference from the nearby channel 9. (WROM-TV since moved, leaving WGTV on 8, after it was also used by WLWA-TV, now WXIA-TV 11.) This was also necessary to satisfy Federal Communications Commission (FCC) rules preventing the excessive concentration of media ownership, preventing the combined paper from running two stations.

In 1989, Bill Dedman received the Pulitzer Prize for Investigative Reporting for The Color of Money, his exposé on racial discrimination in mortgage lending, or redlining, by Atlanta banks. The newspapers' editor, Bill Kovach, had resigned in November 1988 after the stories on banks and others had ruffled feathers in Atlanta and among corporate leadership, some of whom complained of a "take-no-prisoners" editorial approach.

In 1993, Mike Toner received the Pulitzer Prize for Explanatory Reporting for When Bugs Fight Back, his series about organisms and their resistance to antibiotics and pesticides.

In 2002, Julia Wallace was the first woman to become editor of The Atlanta Journal-Constitution. She was named Editor of the Year 2004 by Editor & Publisher magazine.

Mike Luckovich won the Pulitzer Prize for editorial cartooning a second time in 2006. He had first received it in 1995 under The Atlanta Constitution banner.

== Circulation ==
The paper used to cover all 159 counties in Georgia and the bordering counties of western North Carolina, where many Atlantans vacation or have second homes. In addition, it had some circulation in other bordering communities, such as Tallahassee, Florida, where the Sunday Atlanta Journal-Constitution was available. Due to the downturn in the newspaper industry and competing media sources, The Atlanta Journal-Constitution contracted distribution dramatically in the late 2000s to serve only the metro area. From Q1 of 2007 to Q1 of 2010, daily circulation plunged over 44%.

In August 2025, The AJC announced it would stop publishing a print edition at the end of the year and go digital only. At the time of the announcement, The AJC had roughly 40,000 print subscribers, a reduction from 94,000 in 2020 and a high of 630,000 in 2004.

== Sustainability ==
The AJC's president, Andrew Morse, has set a goal of 500,000 paid digital subscribers by the end of 2026 to make the business sustainable. However, as of August 2025 the paper reported only 75,000 digital-only subscriptions, an increase from 55,000 in 2023. At its present rate, the AJC is will not meet the 500,000 paid subscriber goal.

Morse has stated that traffic from Google has dropped 40 percent in the last year, and The AJC is facing challenges from artificial intelligence and changing consumption patterns for news readers.

Thirty-four days after ending its print edition, on February 3, 2026, The AJC announced that it was laying off 50 staffers. Approximately half the layoffs are from its newsroom.

== Headquarters ==
The Atlanta Journal-Constitution is based in Midtown Atlanta. It previously had its headquarters in Perimeter Center, an office district of Dunwoody, Georgia. Before that, its headquarters were in Downtown Atlanta near the Five Points district.

In August 2009, The AJC occupied less than 30 percent of its downtown building, becoming outdated and costly. Later that year, The AJC consolidated its printing operations by merging its downtown production center with its Gwinnett County facility. In 2010, the newspaper relocated its headquarters to leased offices in Dunwoody, a northern suburb of Atlanta. In November 2010, the company donated its former downtown headquarters to the city of Atlanta, which plans to convert the building into a fire and police training academy.

In February 2024, the newspaper announced it would return its headquarters to Midtown Atlanta after nearly 14 years, citing a desire "to be at the beating heart of the city" it is named for. The company signed a lease on 21,000 square feet of newsroom and studio space in the Promenade Central building on Peachtree Street, planning to complete its relocation by the end of the year.

== Controversy ==
In 1988, The Atlanta Journal-Constitutions' editor, Bill Kovach, resigned in November after the stories on banks and others had ruffled feathers in Atlanta and among corporate leadership, some of whom complained of a "take-no-prisoners" editorial approach.

In 1996, The AJC was the first newspaper to report on Centennial Olympic Park bombing hero Richard Jewell being accused of actually being the bomber, citing leaked information from the Federal Bureau of Investigation. Even after Jewell was cleared of any accusations by the FBI, The AJC refused to issue an apology and remains the only paper to have not retracted their story by Kathy Scruggs and Ron Martz falsely accusing him of terrorism. The court case regarding this has been dropped after the death of both Richard Jewell and the initial reporter. Jewell died in 2007 at age 44 from diabetes due to poor eating habits that escalated after he was accused.

In 2023, The AJC fired reporter Alan Judd and issued a correction related to his reporting on violence involving the University of Georgia's football program. Judd was a 25-year veteran of The AJC, and a two-time finalist for the Pulitzer Prize. The AJC initially defended Judd, but issued the correction after an internal investigation. The newspaper said it did not find any fabrications in the article. Judd has previously resigned from the Louisville Courier-Journal in 1988 after a series he co-reported misquoted sources and required the paper to issue at least 10 corrections in print.

== Organization of the newspaper ==
The Atlanta Journal-Constitution has four major sections daily. Although the AJC ceased all print publication on December 31, 2025, it still publishes a digital version of traditional newspaper sections and pages.

== Pulitzer Prizes ==
Pulitzer Prizes awarded to journalists at the former Atlanta newspapers:

1931, Public service, The Atlanta Constitution, for exposing graft in city government.

1948, Local reporting, George Goodwin, The Atlanta Journal, for exposing vote fraud in Telfair County during the 1946 gubernatorial campaign.

1959, Editorial writing, Ralph McGill, The Atlanta Constitution. The best known of 10 “editorials,” really front-page columns, was about the 1958 Hebrew Benevolent Congregation Temple bombing.

1960, Local reporting under deadline pressure, Jack Nelson, The Atlanta Constitution, for exposing abuses at Milledgeville State Hospital for the insane.

1967, Editorial writing, Eugene Patterson, The Atlanta Constitution. The editorials discussed the ambush shooting of James Meredith, Julian Bond’s exclusion from the Georgia House of Representatives and other topics.

1988, Editorial cartooning, Doug Marlette, The Atlanta Constitution, shared with The Charlotte Observer, where four of his 10 prize-winning cartoons were published.

1989, Investigative reporting, Bill Dedman, The Atlanta Journal-Constitution, “The Color of Money,” a series about racial discrimination in lending practices in middle-income neighborhoods in metro Atlanta.

1993, Explanatory journalism, Mike Toner, The Atlanta Journal-Constitution, “When Bugs Fight Back,” a series about how organisms have developed resistance to antibiotics and pesticides.

1995, Editorial cartooning, Mike Luckovich, The Atlanta Journal-Constitution, for cartoons on topics including U.S. House Speaker Newt Gingrich, basketball great Dominique Wilkins, and the 1996 Summer Olympics mascot.

2006, Editorial cartooning, Mike Luckovich, The Atlanta Journal-Constitution, for cartoons on topics including U.S. soldiers who died in Iraq.

2007, Commentary, Cynthia Tucker, The Atlanta Journal-Constitution, for editorial columns.

2007, History, Hank Klibanoff, managing editor of The Atlanta Journal-Constitution, for his book, The Race Beat: The Press, the Civil Rights Struggle, and the Awakening of a Nation, written with Gene Roberts.

== Notable people ==
- Furman Bisher
- James M. Cox
- Bill Dedman
- George Goodwin
- Henry W. Grady
- Lewis Grizzard
- Joel Chandler Harris
- Hank Klibanoff
- Bill Kovach
- Mike Luckovich
- Doug Marlette
- Ralph McGill
- Margaret Mitchell
- Jack Nelson
- Maude Andrews Ohl
- Eugene Patterson
- Wallace Putnam Reed
- Celestine Sibley
- Hoke Smith
- Mike Toner
- Cynthia Tucker

== See also ==
- Atlanta Constitution Building (former headquarters)
- Richard Jewell
- Media in Atlanta
- List of newspapers in Georgia (U.S. state)
