= Ginger Thompson =

American journalist

- Ginger Thompson at the 2026 conference of the National Association of Hispanic Journalists
- Education: Purdue University; George Washington University
- Occupations: Journalist; reporter

Ginger Thompson is an American journalist and a senior reporter at ProPublica. A 2001 Pulitzer Prize Winner in National Reporting and finalist for the National Magazine Award, she spent 15 years at The New York Times, including time as a Washington correspondent and as an investigative reporter whose stories revealed Washington’s secret, sometimes tragic, role in Mexico’s fight against drug traffickers.

Thompson served as the Mexico City Bureau Chief for both The Times and The Baltimore Sun, and, for her work in the region, she was a finalist for the Pulitzer’s Gold Medal for Public Service and the winner of the Maria Moors Cabot Prize, the Selden Ring Award for investigative reporting, an InterAmerican Press Association Award, and an Overseas Press Club Award.

Prior to going to Mexico City for The Times, Thompson was part of a team of national reporters there that was awarded a 2000 Pulitzer Prize for the series "How Race is Lived in America".

== Life ==
Thompson graduated from Purdue University, where she was the school newspaper’s managing editor, and George Washington University, with a Master of Public Policy with a focus on human rights law.

After 15 years with The New York Times, Thompson now works for ProPublica. Her work has also appeared in The Atlantic and National Geographic. She teaches at Columbia Journalism School.
