= Gene Roberts (journalist) =

American journalist (born 1932)

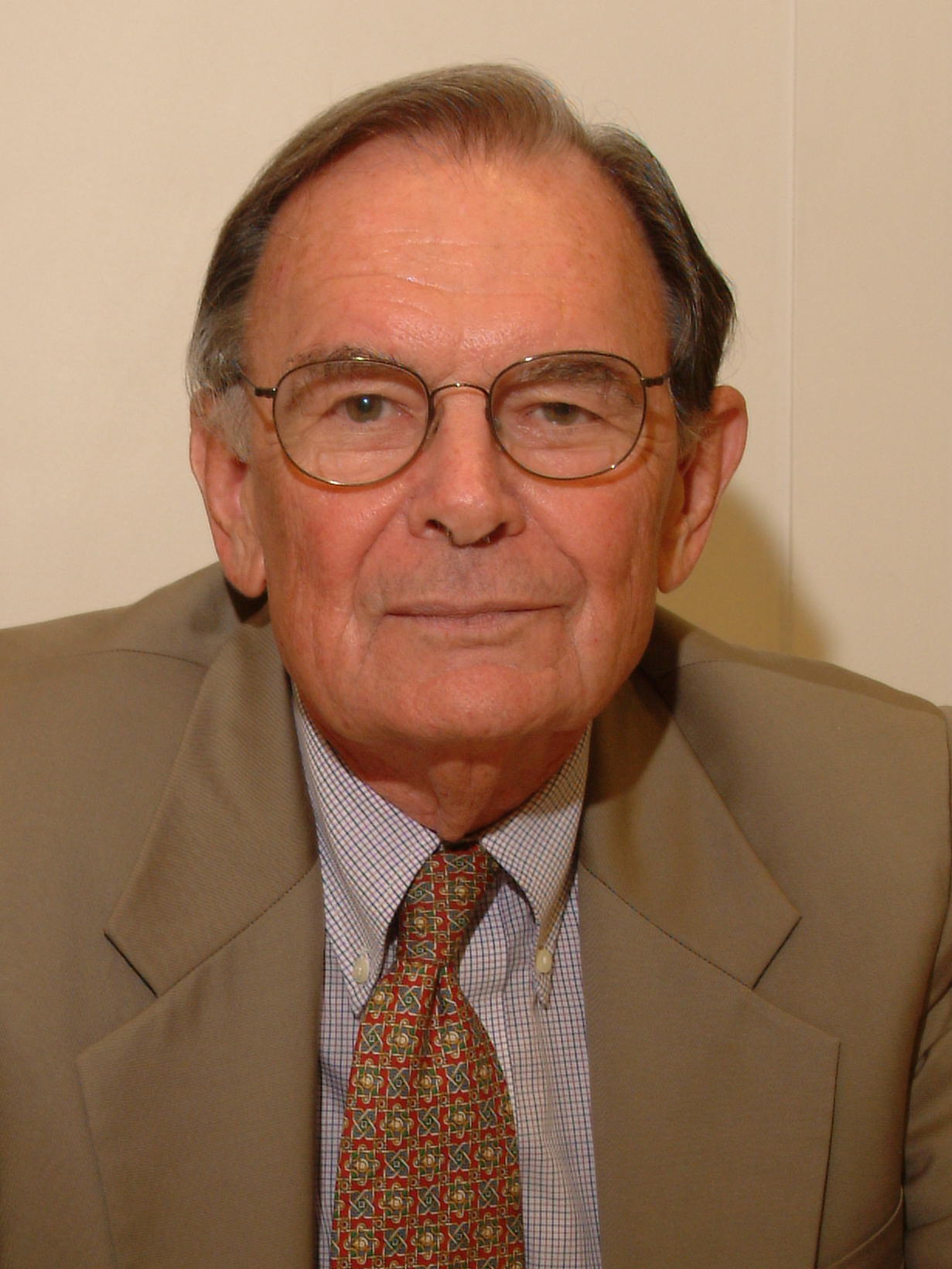
- Roberts in 2007
- Born: Eugene Leslie Roberts Jr. June 15, 1932 (age 94); Goldsboro, North Carolina, U.S.
- Occupations: Journalist, professor of journalism
- Notable credit(s): The New York Times; The Philadelphia Inquirer; books: The Race Beat with Hank Klibanoff; The Censors and the Schools with Jack Nelson; Assignment America: A Collection of Outstanding Writing from the New York Times, editor, with David R. Jones; Leaving Readers Behind: the age of corporate newspapering with Thomas Kunkel and Charles Layton; and Breach of Faith: a crisis of coverage in the age of corporate newspapering with Thomas Kunkel
- Title: Professor of Journalism, Philip Merrill College of Journalism, University of Maryland, College Park, Maryland
- Spouse: Susan McLamb Roberts
- Children: Leslie Roberts, Maggie Roberts, Elizabeth Roberts, Polly Roberts
- Relatives: sister, Peggy Ellis; grandchildren, Emma Roberts Zevin; Wiley Roberts Guillot
- Awards: Pulitzer Prize for History; National Press Club award

Eugene Leslie Roberts Jr. (born June 15, 1932) is an American journalist and professor of journalism. He has been a national editor of The New York Times, executive editor of The Philadelphia Inquirer from 1972 to 1990, and managing editor of The New York Times from 1994 to 1997. Roberts is most known for presiding over The Inquirer's "Golden Age", a time in which the newspaper was given increased freedom and resources, won 17 Pulitzer Prizes in 18 years, displaced The Philadelphia Bulletin as the city's "paper of record", and was considered to be Knight Ridder's crown jewel as a profitable enterprise and an influential regional paper. As an author, Roberts received the Pulitzer Prize for history.

== Career ==
Roberts was born in Pikeville in the Goldsboro, North Carolina Metropolitan Area. He grew up in North Carolina and worked for newspapers in Goldsboro, North Carolina; Norfolk, Virginia; Raleigh, North Carolina; and Detroit. He covered the Kennedy Assassination in Dallas for the Detroit Free Press and subsequently covered the civil rights movement as a correspondent for The New York Times, where he also served as Saigon bureau chief in 1968 during the Vietnam War. After serving as national editor at The Times from 1969 to 1972, he was hired by John S. Knight to head The Inquirer. He retired in 1990 and returned to the Times as managing editor from 1994 to 1998.

Roberts taught journalism from 1991 to 1994 and from 1998 to 2010 at the Philip Merrill College of Journalism, University of Maryland.

Roberts is on the board of directors of the Committee to Protect Journalists and served five years as its chairman; he has also served as chairman of the Pulitzer Prize Board, the International Press Institute, and the Board Of Visitors of the School of Communications at the University of North Carolina at Chapel Hill.

== Pulitzer Prizes ==
The Inquirer had never won any Pulitzer Prize (established 1917) before Roberts became executive editor but won them under his leadership.

- 1975, national reporting
- 1976, editorial cartoons
- 1977, local reporting
- 1978, public service journalism
- 1979, international reporting
- 1980, local reporting
- 1985, investigative reporting
- 1985, feature photography
- 1986, feature photography
- 1986, national reporting
- 1987, feature writing
- 1987, investigative reporting
- 1987, investigative reporting
- 1988, national reporting
- 1989, national reporting
- 1989, feature writing
- 1990, public service journalism

== Awards ==
Roberts and Hank Klibanoff, managing editor of the Atlanta Journal-Constitution, won the 2007 Pulitzer Prize for History recognizing their book The Race Beat as the year's best published in the U.S. In it, Roberts and Klibanoff chronicled the civil rights struggle in America and the role the press played in bringing it to the forefront. The book's major contributions were an analysis of Gunnar Myrdal and Ralph Bunche's 1944 treatise, An American Dilemma: The Negro Problem and Modern Democracy, which had explained the problem of racial inequality and its possible resolution, and a close examination of the contribution of the black press to the Civil Rights Movement.

In 1980, he received the Golden Plate Award of the American Academy of Achievement.

In 1984, Roberts was inducted into the N.C. Journalism Hall of Fame.

Roberts received the National Press Club's Fourth Estate Award for Distinguished Contributions to Journalism in 1993.

Roberts was awarded the Order of the Long Leaf Pine by the state of North Carolina on January 30, 2015.

== Personal ==
Roberts earned an Associate degree from Mars Hill College in North Carolina. He went on to receive his B.A. in journalism from the University of North Carolina at Chapel Hill in 1954 and was later a Nieman Fellow at Harvard University.

== Books as co-author or co-editor ==
- The Censors and the Schools (Little, Brown, 1963; Greenwood Press, 1977, ISBN 0837196876), by Roberts and Jack Nelson
- Assignment America: A Collection of Outstanding Writing from the New York Times (Quadrangle, 1974; ISBN 0812903846), eds. Roberts and David R. Jones
- Leaving Readers Behind: the age of corporate newspapering (University of Arkansas Press, 2001; ISBN 1557287716), editor-in-chief, with Thomas Kunkel and Charles Layton
- Breach of Faith: a crisis of coverage in the age of corporate newspapering (University of Arkansas Press, 2002; ISBN 1557287090), editor-in-chief, with Thomas Kunkel
- The Race Beat: The Press, the Civil Rights Struggle, and the Awakening of a Nation (Alfred A. Knopf, 2006; ISBN 0679403817), by Roberts and Hank Klibanoff
