= Hank Klibanoff =

American journalist (born 1949)

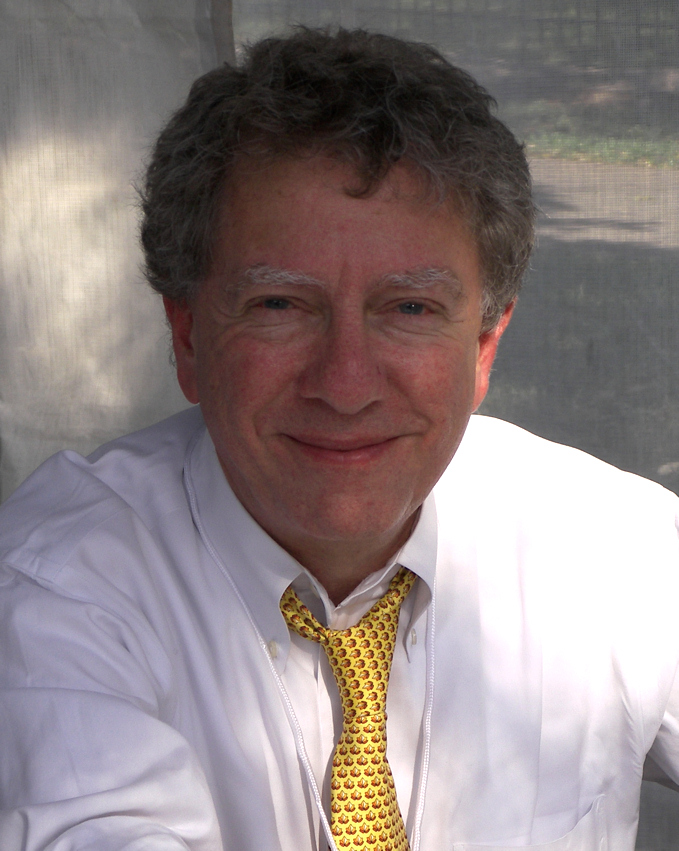
- Hank Klibanoff in 2007
- Born: March 26, 1949 (age 77); Florence, Alabama, U.S.
- Education: Coffee High School; Washington University in St. Louis (BA); Medill School of Journalism
- Occupations: Journalist; professor
- Spouse: Laurie Leonard
- Children: 3
- Awards: Peabody Award (2018)

Hank Klibanoff (born March 26, 1949, in Florence, Alabama) is an American journalist, now a professor at Emory University. He and Gene Roberts won the 2007 Pulitzer Prize for History for the book The Race Beat: The Press, the Civil Rights Struggle, and the Awakening of a Nation.

== Early life and education ==
Hank Klibanoff was born and raised in Florence, Alabama. He got an early start in journalism delivering newspapers by bicycle. He graduated from Coffee High School in Florence and attended Washington University in St. Louis, where he studied under Howard Nemerov and received his B.A. in English. He subsequently received a master's degree in journalism from the Medill School of Northwestern University.

== Career ==
He was managing editor of the Atlanta Journal-Constitution until June 24, 2008, when he stepped down. He had been deputy managing editor for The Philadelphia Inquirer, where he worked for 20 years. He had also been a reporter for six years in Mississippi and three years at The Boston Globe.

Klibanoff is currently the director of the journalism program at Emory University in Atlanta, Georgia, as well as the project managing editor of the Civil Rights Cold Case Project.

He hosts a podcast called "Buried Truths" about racial tensions in Georgia during and after the 1948 election. The podcast won a 2018 Peabody Award.

== Family ==
Klibanoff is father to 3 girls, Eleanor, Caroline and Corinne; he is married to Laurie Leonard.
