= 2011 Pulitzer Prize =

Awards for journalism and related fields

The 2011 Pulitzer Prizes were announced on Monday, April 18, 2011. The Los Angeles Times won two prizes, including the highest honor for Public Service. The New York Times also won two awards. No prize was handed out in the Breaking News category. The Wall Street Journal won an award for the first time since 2007. Jennifer Egan's A Visit From the Goon Squad picked up the Fiction prize after already winning the 2010 National Book Critics Circle Award. Photographer Carol Guzy of The Washington Post became the first journalist to win four Pulitzer Prizes.

In December 2010, three rules changes were revealed for the 2011 Awards. The first allows print and online outlets that publish at least weekly to use a number of media to report the news "including text reporting, videos, databases, multimedia or interactive presentations or any combination of those formats". The second rule change allows up to five people to be named in an award citation; the previous limit was three. The final rule change allows for digital submission of images to the judges in the two photography categories.

The winner(s) in each category are:

== Journalism ==
- Pulitzer Prize for Public Service to the Los Angeles Times "for its exposure of corruption in the small California city of Bell, where officials tapped the treasury to pay themselves exorbitant salaries, resulting in arrests and reforms."
- Pulitzer Prize for Breaking News Reporting was not awarded because no single entry received the necessary majority for the prize.
- Pulitzer Prize for Investigative Reporting to Paige St. John (Sarasota Herald-Tribune) "for her examination of weaknesses in the murky property-insurance system vital to Florida homeowners, providing handy data to assess insurer reliability and stirring regulatory action."
- Pulitzer Prize for Explanatory Reporting to Mark Johnson, Kathleen Gallagher, Gary Porter, Lou Saldivar, and Alison Sherwood (Milwaukee Journal Sentinel) "for their lucid examination of an epic effort to use genetic technology to save a 4-year-old boy imperiled by a mysterious disease, told with words, graphics, videos and other images."
- Pulitzer Prize for Local Reporting to Frank Main, Mark Konkol, and John J. Kim (Chicago Sun-Times) "for their immersive documentation of violence in Chicago neighborhoods, probing the lives of victims, criminals and detectives as a widespread code of silence impedes solutions."
- Pulitzer Prize for National Reporting to Jesse Eisinger and Jake Bernstein ProPublica "for their exposure of questionable practices on Wall Street that contributed to the nation's economic meltdown, using digital tools to help explain the complex subject to lay readers."
- Pulitzer Prize for International Reporting to Clifford J. Levy and Ellen Barry (The New York Times) "for their dogged reporting that put a human face on the faltering justice system in Russia, remarkably influencing the discussion inside the country."
- Pulitzer Prize for Feature Writing to Amy Ellis Nutt (The Star-Ledger, Newark, N.J.) "for her deeply probing story of the mysterious sinking of a commercial fishing boat in the Atlantic Ocean that drowned six men."
- Pulitzer Prize for Commentary to David Leonhardt (The New York Times) "for his graceful penetration of America's complicated economic questions, from the federal budget deficit to health care reform."
- Pulitzer Prize for Criticism to Sebastian Smee (The Boston Globe) "for his vivid and exuberant writing about art, often bringing great works to life with love and appreciation."
- Pulitzer Prize for Editorial Writing to Joseph Rago (The Wall Street Journal) "for his well crafted, against-the-grain editorials challenging the health care reform advocated by President Obama."
- Pulitzer Prize for Editorial Cartooning to Mike Keefe (The Denver Post) "for his widely ranging cartoons that employ a loose, expressive style to send strong, witty messages."
- Pulitzer Prize for Breaking News Photography to Carol Guzy, Nikki Kahn, and Ricky Carioti (The Washington Post) "for their up-close portrait of grief and desperation after a catastrophic earthquake struck Haiti."
- Pulitzer Prize for Feature Photography to Barbara Davidson (Los Angeles Times) "for her intimate story of innocent victims trapped in the city's crossfire of deadly gang violence."

== Letters, Drama and Music ==
- Pulitzer Prize for Fiction to A Visit From the Goon Squad (Alfred A. Knopf) by Jennifer Egan, "an inventive investigation of growing up and growing old in the digital age, displaying a big-hearted curiosity about cultural change at warp speed."
- Pulitzer Prize for Drama to Clybourne Park by Bruce Norris, "a powerful work whose memorable characters speak in witty and perceptive ways to America's sometimes toxic struggle with race and class consciousness."
- Pulitzer Prize for History to The Fiery Trial: Abraham Lincoln and American Slavery W. W. Norton & Company by Eric Foner, "a well orchestrated examination of Lincoln's changing views of slavery, bringing unforeseeable twists and a fresh sense of improbability to a familiar story."
- Pulitzer Prize for Biography to Washington: A Life by Ron Chernow The Penguin Press, "a sweeping, authoritative portrait of an iconic leader learning to master his private feelings in order to fulfill his public duties."
- Pulitzer Prize for Poetry to The Best of It: New and Selected Poems by Kay Ryan (Grove Atlantic), "a body of work spanning 45 years, witty, rebellious and yet tender, a treasure trove of an iconoclastic and joyful mind."
- Pulitzer Prize for General Nonfiction to The Emperor of All Maladies: A Biography of Cancer (Scribner by Siddhartha Mukherjee, "an elegant inquiry, at once clinical and personal, into the long history of an insidious disease that, despite treatment breakthroughs, still bedevils medical science."
- Pulitzer Prize for Music to Zhou Long for Madame White Snake (libretto by Cerise Lim Jacobs)(Oxford University Press), "a deeply expressive opera that draws on a Chinese folk tale to blend the musical traditions of the East and the West".

== Special Citation ==
Not awarded in 2011.
