= Pulitzer Prize for Explanatory Reporting =

American journalism award

The Pulitzer Prize for Explanatory Reporting has been presented since 1998, for a distinguished example of explanatory reporting that illuminates a significant and complex subject, demonstrating mastery of the subject, lucid writing and clear presentation. From 1985 to 1997, it was known as the Pulitzer Prize for Explanatory Journalism.

The Pulitzer Prize Board announced the new category in November 1984, citing a series of explanatory articles that seven months earlier had won the Pulitzer Prize for Feature Writing. The series, "Making It Fly" by Peter Rinearson of The Seattle Times, was a 29,000-word account of the development of the Boeing 757 jetliner. It had been entered in the National Reporting category, but judges moved it to Feature Writing to award it a prize. In the aftermath, the Pulitzer Prize Board said it was creating the new category in part because of the ambiguity about where explanatory accounts such as "Making It Fly" should be recognized. The Pulitzer Committee issues an official citation explaining the reasons for the award.

== List of winners for Pulitzer Prize for Explanatory Journalism (1985–1997) ==
Year	Name(s)	Publication	Rationale
1985	Jon Franklin	The Baltimore Sun	"for his seven-part series 'The Mind Fixers,' about the new science of molecular psychiatry."
1985	Rob Orcutt	Wausau Daily Herald	"for a special section on Wausau's growing Indochinese refugee population, the Hmong."
1985	Pam Sprague	Wausau Daily Herald	"for a special section on Wausau's growing Indochinese refugee population, the Hmong."
1985	Staff	Greensboro News and Record	"for its series on the complex role tobacco plays in North Carolina."
1986	Staff	The New York Times	"for a six-part comprehensive series on the Strategic Defense Initiative, which explored the scientific, political and foreign policy issues involved in 'Star Wars.'"
1986	Larry Batson	The Minnesota Star Tribune	"for his seven-part series on the water crisis in America and his analysis of proposed remedies."
1986	Robert Cooke	The Atlanta Journal-Constitution	"for their series that examined new developments in genetic engineering and the legal, moral and social ramifications of biotechnology."
1986	Robert Hotz	The Atlanta Journal-Constitution	"for their series that examined new developments in genetic engineering and the legal, moral and social ramifications of biotechnology."
1987	Peter Gorner	Chicago Tribune	"for their series on the promises of gene therapy, which examined the implications of this revolutionary medical treatment."
1987	Jeff Lyon	Chicago Tribune	"for their series on the promises of gene therapy, which examined the implications of this revolutionary medical treatment."
1987	Leon Dash	The Washington Post	"for his six-part series on teen-age pregnancy, which examined in compelling detail the complex realities behind a national problem."
1987	Georgia Tasker	Miami Herald	"for her special report on the vanishing rain forest, which detailed the rapid destruction of one of the earth's oldest and most fragile ecosystems."
1988	Daniel Hertzberg	The Wall Street Journal	"for their stories about an investment banker charged with insider trading and the critical day that followed the October 19, 1987 stock market crash."
1988	James B. Stewart	The Wall Street Journal	"for their stories about an investment banker charged with insider trading and the critical day that followed the October 19, 1987 stock market crash."
1988	Athelia Knight	The Washington Post	"for her account of a year in the life of an urban high school, an in-depth portrait that examined many of the problems facing American education."
1988	Tim Weiner	The Philadelphia Inquirer	"for his series of reports on a secret Pentagon budget used by the government to sponsor defense research and an arms buildup."
1989	Karen Blessen (artist)	The Dallas Morning News	"for their special report on a 1985 airplane crash, the follow-up investigation, and the implications for air safety."
1989	David Hanners (reporter)	The Dallas Morning News	"for their special report on a 1985 airplane crash, the follow-up investigation, and the implications for air safety."
1989	William Snyder (photographer)	The Dallas Morning News	"for their special report on a 1985 airplane crash, the follow-up investigation, and the implications for air safety."
1989	David Shaw	Los Angeles Times	"for his candid and thorough reporting on media practices and practitioners."
1989	Bernard Wysocki	The Wall Street Journal	"for stories about America's struggle to maintain its technological superiority over international competitors, especially Japan."
1990	Steve Coll	The Washington Post	"for stories scrutinizing the U.S. Securities and Exchange Commission and the way it has been affected by the policies of its former chairman, John Shad."
1990	David A. Vise	The Washington Post	"for stories scrutinizing the U.S. Securities and Exchange Commission and the way it has been affected by the policies of its former chairman, John Shad."
1990	Eric Nalder	The Seattle Times	"for a revealing series about oil tanker safety and the failure of industry and government to adequately oversee the shipping of oil."
1990	Staff	The Dallas Morning News	"for a series about five 'hidden wars' being waged around the world, primarily in Third World countries."
1990	Staff	Daily Times-Advocate	"for its coverage of a shooting spree by a local mail carrier and the subsequent examination of the problems and stress faced by postal service workers."
1991	Susan Faludi	The Wall Street Journal	"for a report on the leveraged buy-out of Safeway Stores, Inc., that revealed the human costs of high finance."
1991	Peter Gorner	Chicago Tribune	"for their series about the promises and quandaries of genetic research."
1991	Ronald Kotulak	Chicago Tribune	"for their series about the promises and quandaries of genetic research."
1991	Charles Hite	The Roanoke Times	"for insightful stories about life-and-death decisions at a local intensive care unit."
1992	Eric Lipton	Hartford Courant	"for a series about the flawed Hubble Space Telescope that illustrated many of the problems plaguing USA's space program."
1992	Robert S. Capers	Hartford Courant	"for a series about the flawed Hubble Space Telescope that illustrated many of the problems plaguing USA's space program."
1992	Andrew Boyd	The Times-Picayune	"for 'Louisiana in Peril,' articles about the toxic waste and pollution that threaten the future of the state."
1992	James O'Byrne	The Times-Picayune	"for 'Louisiana in Peril,' articles about the toxic waste and pollution that threaten the future of the state."
1992	Mark Schleifstein	The Times-Picayune	"for 'Louisiana in Peril,' articles about the toxic waste and pollution that threaten the future of the state."
1992	Rob Carson	The News Tribune	"for comprehensive coverage of a controversial and ultimately unsuccessful special initiative on the state's 1991 ballot that would have granted terminally ill individuals the right to have a physician end their lives."
1992	Suki Dardarian	The News Tribune	"for comprehensive coverage of a controversial and ultimately unsuccessful special initiative on the state's 1991 ballot that would have granted terminally ill individuals the right to have a physician end their lives."
1992	Geff Hinds	The News Tribune	"for comprehensive coverage of a controversial and ultimately unsuccessful special initiative on the state's 1991 ballot that would have granted terminally ill individuals the right to have a physician end their lives."
1993	Mike Toner	The Atlanta Journal-Constitution	"for 'When Bugs Fight Back', a series that explored the diminishing effectiveness of antibiotics and pesticides."
1993	Dennis Farney	The Wall Street Journal	"for 'The American Civilization,' a series of articles examining Jeffersonian ideals in contemporary America."
1993	Staff	The Post-Standard	"for its series about the inadequate medical care given New York state prison inmates."
1994	Ronald Kotulak	Chicago Tribune	"for his lucid coverage of current developments in neurological science."
1994	Staff	The Dallas Morning News	"for its series examining the epidemic of violence against women in many nations."
1994	Staff	Newsday	"for its exhaustive investigation of breast cancer in the community, which included a probe of the environmental factors that may contribute to its spread."
1995	Leon Dash (staff writer)	The Washington Post	"for their profile of a District of Columbia family's struggle with destructive cycles of poverty, illiteracy, crime and drug abuse."
1995	Lucian Perkins (photographer)	The Washington Post	"for their profile of a District of Columbia family's struggle with destructive cycles of poverty, illiteracy, crime and drug abuse."
1995	Ron Suskind	The Wall Street Journal	"for his stories about inner-city honor students in Washington, D.C. and their determination to survive and prosper."
1995	Staff	Montgomery Advertiser	"for its probe of questionable management practices and self-interest at the Southern Poverty Law Center, the nation's best-endowed civil rights charity."
1996	Laurie Garrett	Newsday	"for her courageous reporting from Zaire on the Ebola virus outbreak there." (Note: Moved by the Pulitzer board from the International Reporting category.)
1996	Adam Bryant	The New York Times	"for their coverage of deficient safety regulation of commuter air traffic."
1996	Stephen Engelberg	The New York Times	"for their coverage of deficient safety regulation of commuter air traffic."
1996	Matthew Wald	The New York Times	"for their coverage of deficient safety regulation of commuter air traffic."
1996	Michael Hiltzik	Los Angeles Times	"for reporting on problems stemming from the lack of regulation in California's booming managed health care industry and the implications for the rest of the country."
1996	Barbara Marsh	Los Angeles Times	"for reporting on problems stemming from the lack of regulation in California's booming managed health care industry and the implications for the rest of the country."
1996	David Olmos	Los Angeles Times	"for reporting on problems stemming from the lack of regulation in California's booming managed health care industry and the implications for the rest of the country."
1996	Chris Lester	The Kansas City Star	"for their series on the impact of spreading suburban growth."
1996	Jeffrey Spivak	The Kansas City Star	"for their series on the impact of spreading suburban growth."
1997	Ron Cortes (photographer)	The Philadelphia Inquirer	"for a series on the choices that confronted critically ill patients who sought to die with dignity."
1997	April Saul (photographer)	The Philadelphia Inquirer	"for a series on the choices that confronted critically ill patients who sought to die with dignity."
1997	Michael Vitez (reporter)	The Philadelphia Inquirer	"for a series on the choices that confronted critically ill patients who sought to die with dignity."
1997	John Crewdson	Chicago Tribune	"for a series of reports that illustrated through dramatic examples the need for training of personnel and installation of special equipment by U.S. airlines to cope with medical emergencies in the air."
1997	Gregory Kane	The Baltimore Sun	"for their portrait of the complex practices of slavery in the Sudan."
1997	Gilbert Lewthwaite	The Baltimore Sun	"for their portrait of the complex practices of slavery in the Sudan."

== List of winners for Pulitzer Prize for Explanatory Reporting (1998–present) ==
Year	Name(s)	Publication	Rationale
1998	Paul Salopek	Chicago Tribune	"for his enlightening profile of the Human Genome Diversity Project, which seeks to chart the genetic relationship among all people."
1998	David Barstow	St. Petersburg Times	"for his narrative portrait of the legal struggle against the tobacco industry, centered on the personalities who were key in reaching a tentative settlement of billions of dollars."
1998	Linda Greenhouse	The New York Times	"for her consistently illuminating coverage of the United States Supreme Court." (Note: Moved by the Pulitzer board to the Beat Reporting category.)
1999	Richard Read	The Oregonian	"for vividly illustrating the domestic impact of the Asian economic crisis by profiling the local industry that exports frozen french fries."
1999	Tom Brune	The Seattle Times	"for his revealing analysis of the Washington state initiative on affirmative action that challenged accepted notions about practices that had been in place for three decades."
1999	William Carlsen	San Francisco Chronicle	"for their compelling series chronicling the epidemic of health risks associated with the reckless use of unsafe hypodermic needles."
1999	Reynolds Holding	San Francisco Chronicle	"for their compelling series chronicling the epidemic of health risks associated with the reckless use of unsafe hypodermic needles."
2000	Eric Newhouse	Great Falls Tribune	"for his vivid examination of alcohol abuse and the problems it creates in the community."
2000	Alex Pulaski	The Oregonian	"for their series on how politics influences pesticide regulation."
2000	Brent Walth	The Oregonian	"for their series on how politics influences pesticide regulation."
2000	Michael Winerip	The New York Times	"for his profile of a mentally ill man who pushed a woman to her death before an onrushing subway train, a case used by the writer for a broad overview of deficiencies in the mental health care system."
2001	Staff	Chicago Tribune	"for 'Gateway to Gridlock,' its clear and compelling profile of the chaotic American air traffic system."
2001	Louise Kiernan	Chicago Tribune	"for her moving and humane portrait of a young mother killed by a falling skyscraper window, its effect on her three-year-old daughter, and the negligence of the company involved."
2001	Staff	The New York Times	"for its insightful coverage of the completed deciphering of the human genome, which explained the scientific context for understanding the chemical string that makes up DNA, as well as the discovery's implications for the future."
2002	Staff	The New York Times	"for its informed and detailed reporting, before and after the September 11th attacks on the USA, that profiled the global terrorism network and the threats it posed."
2002	David Finkel	The Washington Post	"for his illuminating series of articles on the lives and journeys of international migrants."
2002	Staff	The New York Times	"for its sustained explanatory reporting on the nature of the structural damage at 'Ground Zero,' the lower Manhattan area where the World Trade Center towers collapsed."
2003	Staff	The Wall Street Journal	"for its clear, concise and comprehensive stories that illuminated the roots, significance and impact of corporate scandals in the US." (Note: Moved by the Pulitzer board from the Public Service category.)
2003	Jim Haner	The Baltimore Sun	"for 'Justice Undone,' their in-depth examination of the city's disturbingly low conviction rate in murder cases."
2003	John B. O'Donnell	The Baltimore Sun	"for 'Justice Undone,' their in-depth examination of the city's disturbingly low conviction rate in murder cases."
2003	Kimberly Wilson	The Baltimore Sun	"for 'Justice Undone,' their in-depth examination of the city's disturbingly low conviction rate in murder cases."
2003	Staff	Milwaukee Journal Sentinel	"for its painstaking explanation of chronic wasting disease among deer in Wisconsin, and the impact of the affliction on the state's citizens, communities and culture."
2004	Thomas Burton	The Wall Street Journal	"for their groundbreaking examination of aneurysms, an often overlooked medical condition that kills thousands of Americans each year."
2004	Kevin Helliker	The Wall Street Journal	"for their groundbreaking examination of aneurysms, an often overlooked medical condition that kills thousands of Americans each year."
2004	William Heisel	The Orange County Register	"for their ambitious exploration of the quality of care at 26 local hospitals and the creation of a 'report card' to help consumers make medical decisions."
2004	Chris Knap	The Orange County Register	"for their ambitious exploration of the quality of care at 26 local hospitals and the creation of a 'report card' to help consumers make medical decisions."
2004	Bernard Wolfson	The Orange County Register	"for their ambitious exploration of the quality of care at 26 local hospitals and the creation of a 'report card' to help consumers make medical decisions."
2004	Erika Niedowski	The Baltimore Sun	"for her illuminating account of how one of America's best hospitals let an infant die of a preventable condition and how the devastated mother joined with the hospital to spare other families such heartache."
2005	Gareth Cook	The Boston Globe	"for explaining, with clarity and humanity, the complex scientific and ethical dimensions of stem cell research."
2005	William Broad	The New York Times	"for their aggressive reporting and lucid writing that cast light on the shadowy process of nuclear proliferation."
2005	David E. Sanger	The New York Times	"for their aggressive reporting and lucid writing that cast light on the shadowy process of nuclear proliferation."
2005	Staff	Newsday	"for its serious, energetic and substantive series examining three decades of hip-hop music in American life."
2006	David Finkel	The Washington Post	"for his ambitious, clear-eyed case study of the United States government's attempt to bring democracy to Yemen."
2006	Debbie Cenziper	Miami Herald	"for her deeply researched examination of breakdowns in hurricane forecasting that often endanger lives."
2006	Mark Johnson	Milwaukee Journal Sentinel	"for their riveting chronicle of a teenage girl's miraculous recovery from a rabies infection that medicine had previously considered fatal."
2006	Kawanza Newson	Milwaukee Journal Sentinel	"for their riveting chronicle of a teenage girl's miraculous recovery from a rabies infection that medicine had previously considered fatal."
2007	Usha Lee McFarling	Los Angeles Times	"for their richly portrayed reports on the world's distressed oceans, telling the story in print and online, and stirring reaction among readers and officials."
2007	Rick Loomis	Los Angeles Times	"for their richly portrayed reports on the world's distressed oceans, telling the story in print and online, and stirring reaction among readers and officials."
2007	Kenneth R. Weiss	Los Angeles Times	"for their richly portrayed reports on the world's distressed oceans, telling the story in print and online, and stirring reaction among readers and officials."
2007	Joanne Kimberlin	The Virginian-Pilot	"for their provocative examination of the United States' increasing reliance on private military personnel."
2007	Bill Sizemore	The Virginian-Pilot	"for their provocative examination of the United States' increasing reliance on private military personnel."
2007	Staff	The New York Times	"for its multi-faceted explanation of the growing menace of diabetes, especially among the poor and vulnerable, that elicited a range of public and private responses."
2008	Amy Harmon	The New York Times	"for her striking examination of the dilemmas and ethical issues that accompany DNA testing, using human stories to sharpen her reports."
2008	Beth Daley	The Boston Globe	"for her evocative exploration of how global warming affects New Englanders, from ice fishermen to blueberry farmers."
2008	Staff	The Oregonian	"for its richly illustrated reports on a breakthrough in producing the microprocessors that are a technological cornerstone of modern life."
2009	Bettina Boxall	Los Angeles Times	"for their fresh and painstaking exploration into the cost and effectiveness of attempts to combat the growing menace of wildfires across the western United States."
2009	Julie Cart	Los Angeles Times	"for their fresh and painstaking exploration into the cost and effectiveness of attempts to combat the growing menace of wildfires across the western United States."
2009	Brady Dennis	The Washington Post	"for their vivid, richly documented explanation of why AIG, the insurance industry giant, nearly collapsed and what lessons the crisis holds for the nation's policymakers."
2009	Robert O'Harrow	The Washington Post	"for their vivid, richly documented explanation of why AIG, the insurance industry giant, nearly collapsed and what lessons the crisis holds for the nation's policymakers."
2009	Adam Liptak	The New York Times	"for his lucid exposition of how the cornerstones of the American judicial system differ from those in other democratic nations, awakening readers to the benefits and drawbacks of those differences."
2010	Michael Moss	The New York Times	"for relentless reporting on contaminated hamburger and other food safety issues that, in print and online, spotlighted defects in federal regulation and led to improved practices." (Note: Moved by the Pulitzer board from the Investigative Reporting category.)
2010	Staff	The New York Times	"for relentless reporting on contaminated hamburger and other food safety issues that, in print and online, spotlighted defects in federal regulation and led to improved practices."
2010	Dan Egan	Milwaukee Journal Sentinel	"for his path-breaking coverage of how invasive aquatic creatures have disrupted the ecosystem of the Great Lakes and other bodies of water, illuminating the science and politics of an important national issue."
2010	Kirsten Grind	Puget Sound Business Journal	"for their meticulous examination of the collapse of Washington Mutual, the biggest bank failure in U.S. history, plumbing causes and raising troubling questions about federal regulation."
2010	Jeanne Lang Jones	Puget Sound Business Journal	"for their meticulous examination of the collapse of Washington Mutual, the biggest bank failure in U.S. history, plumbing causes and raising troubling questions about federal regulation."
2010	Alwyn Scott	Puget Sound Business Journal	"for their meticulous examination of the collapse of Washington Mutual, the biggest bank failure in U.S. history, plumbing causes and raising troubling questions about federal regulation."
2010	Gina Kolata	The New York Times	"for their exploration of the lack of progress in the 40-year war on cancer, combining explanation of scientific complexity and the exposure of myths with an empathetic portrayal of the human suffering caused by the disease."
2010	Staff	The New York Times	"for their exploration of the lack of progress in the 40-year war on cancer, combining explanation of scientific complexity and the exposure of myths with an empathetic portrayal of the human suffering caused by the disease."
2011	Kathleen Gallagher	Milwaukee Journal Sentinel	"for their lucid examination of an epic effort to use genetic technology to save a 4-year-old boy imperiled by a mysterious disease, told with words, graphics, videos and other images."
2011	Mark Johnson	Milwaukee Journal Sentinel	"for their lucid examination of an epic effort to use genetic technology to save a 4-year-old boy imperiled by a mysterious disease, told with words, graphics, videos and other images."
2011	Gary Porter	Milwaukee Journal Sentinel	"for their lucid examination of an epic effort to use genetic technology to save a 4-year-old boy imperiled by a mysterious disease, told with words, graphics, videos and other images."
2011	Lou Saldivar	Milwaukee Journal Sentinel	"for their lucid examination of an epic effort to use genetic technology to save a 4-year-old boy imperiled by a mysterious disease, told with words, graphics, videos and other images."
2011	Alison Sherwood	Milwaukee Journal Sentinel	"for their lucid examination of an epic effort to use genetic technology to save a 4-year-old boy imperiled by a mysterious disease, told with words, graphics, videos and other images."
2011	Staff	The Wall Street Journal	"for its penetration of the shadowy world of fraud and abuse in Medicare, probing previously concealed government databases to identify millions of dollars in waste and corrupt practices."
2011	Staff	The Washington Post	"for its exploration of how the military is using trauma surgery, brain science and other techniques both old and new to reduce fatalities among the wounded in warfare, telling the story with words, images and other tools."
2012	David Kocieniewski	The New York Times	"for his lucid series that penetrated a legal thicket to explain how the nation's wealthiest citizens and corporations often exploited loopholes and avoided taxes."
2012	Tom Frank	USA Today	"for his sharply focused exploration of inflated pensions for state and local employees, enhancing stories with graphic material to show how state legislators pump up retirement benefits in creative but unconscionable ways."
2012	Staff	The Wall Street Journal	"for its tenacious exploration of how personal information is harvested from the cellphones and computers of unsuspecting Americans by corporations and public officials in a largely unmonitored realm of modern life."
2013	Staff	The New York Times	"for its penetrating look into business practices by Apple and other technology companies that illustrates the darker side of a changing global economy for workers and consumers."
2013	Tony Bartelme	The Post and Courier	"for his stories that helped readers understand the complex factors driving up their insurance bills."
2013	Dan Egan	Milwaukee Journal Sentinel	"for his exhaustive examination of the struggle to keep Asian carp and other invasive species from reaching the Great Lakes and ultimately all of the nation's inland waters, a story enhanced by animated graphics."
2014	Eli Saslow	The Washington Post	"for his unsettling and nuanced reporting on the prevalence of food stamps in post-recession US, forcing readers to grapple with issues of poverty and dependency."
2014	Dennis Overbye	The New York Times	"for his authoritative illumination of the race by two competing teams of 3,000 scientists and technicians over a seven-year period to discover what physicists call the 'God particle.'"
2014	Les Zaitz	The Oregonian	"for chilling narratives that, at personal risk to him and his sources, revealed how lethal Mexican drug cartels infiltrated Oregon and other regions of the country."
2015	Zachary Mider	Bloomberg News	"for a painstaking, clear and entertaining explanation of how so many U.S. corporations dodge taxes and why lawmakers and regulators have a hard time stopping them."
2015	Joe Amon	The Denver Post	"for an intimate and troubling portrayal of how Colorado's relaxed marijuana laws have drawn hundreds of parents to the state to seek miracle cures for desperately ill children."
2015	John Ingold	The Denver Post	"for an intimate and troubling portrayal of how Colorado's relaxed marijuana laws have drawn hundreds of parents to the state to seek miracle cures for desperately ill children."
2015	Lindsay Pierce	The Denver Post	"for an intimate and troubling portrayal of how Colorado's relaxed marijuana laws have drawn hundreds of parents to the state to seek miracle cures for desperately ill children."
2015	Joan Biskupic	Reuters	"for using data analysis to reveal how an elite cadre of lawyers enjoy extraordinary access to the U.S. Supreme Court, raising doubts about the ideal of equal justice."
2015	Janet Roberts	Reuters	"for using data analysis to reveal how an elite cadre of lawyers enjoy extraordinary access to the U.S. Supreme Court, raising doubts about the ideal of equal justice."
2015	John Shiffman	Reuters	"for using data analysis to reveal how an elite cadre of lawyers enjoy extraordinary access to the U.S. Supreme Court, raising doubts about the ideal of equal justice."
2016	Ken Armstrong	The Marshall Project	"for a startling examination and exposé of law enforcement's enduring failures to investigate reports of rape properly and to comprehend the traumatic effects on its victims."
2016	T. Christian Miller	ProPublica	"for a startling examination and exposé of law enforcement's enduring failures to investigate reports of rape properly and to comprehend the traumatic effects on its victims."
2016	Peter Loftus	The Wall Street Journal	"for a lucid explanation of how pharmaceutical companies employ secretive tactics to raise drug prices relentlessly, at great cost to patients and taxpayers."
2016	Jonathan Rockoff	The Wall Street Journal	"for a lucid explanation of how pharmaceutical companies employ secretive tactics to raise drug prices relentlessly, at great cost to patients and taxpayers."
2016	Ed Silverman	The Wall Street Journal	"for a lucid explanation of how pharmaceutical companies employ secretive tactics to raise drug prices relentlessly, at great cost to patients and taxpayers."
2016	Joseph Walker	The Wall Street Journal	"for a lucid explanation of how pharmaceutical companies employ secretive tactics to raise drug prices relentlessly, at great cost to patients and taxpayers."
2016	Jeanne Whalen	The Wall Street Journal	"for a lucid explanation of how pharmaceutical companies employ secretive tactics to raise drug prices relentlessly, at great cost to patients and taxpayers."
2016	Colin Woodard	Portland Press Herald	"for a compelling account of dramatic ecological changes occurring in the warming ocean region from Nova Scotia to Cape Cod."
2017	Staff	International Consortium of Investigative Journalists	"for the Panama Papers, a series of stories using a collaboration of more than 300 reporters on six continents to expose the hidden infrastructure and global scale of offshore tax havens."
2017	Staff	McClatchy	"for the Panama Papers, a series of stories using a collaboration of more than 300 reporters on six continents to expose the hidden infrastructure and global scale of offshore tax havens."
2017	Staff	Miami Herald	"for the Panama Papers, a series of stories using a collaboration of more than 300 reporters on six continents to expose the hidden infrastructure and global scale of offshore tax havens."
2017	Julia Angwin	ProPublica	"for a rigorous examination that used data journalism and lucid writing to make tangible the abstract world of algorithms and how they shape our lives in realms as disparate as criminal justice, online shopping and social media."
2017	Lauren Kirchner	ProPublica	"for a rigorous examination that used data journalism and lucid writing to make tangible the abstract world of algorithms and how they shape our lives in realms as disparate as criminal justice, online shopping and social media."
2017	Jeff Larson	ProPublica	"for a rigorous examination that used data journalism and lucid writing to make tangible the abstract world of algorithms and how they shape our lives in realms as disparate as criminal justice, online shopping and social media."
2017	Surya Mattu	ProPublica	"for a rigorous examination that used data journalism and lucid writing to make tangible the abstract world of algorithms and how they shape our lives in realms as disparate as criminal justice, online shopping and social media."
2017	Terry Parris	ProPublica	"for a rigorous examination that used data journalism and lucid writing to make tangible the abstract world of algorithms and how they shape our lives in realms as disparate as criminal justice, online shopping and social media."
2017	Joan Garrett McClane	Chattanooga Times Free Press	"for an examination of the income inequality hiding behind Chattanooga's rise as the shining star of the South—reporting that combined data, research and human stories to render a full picture of poverty."
2017	Joy Lukachick Smith	Chattanooga Times Free Press	"for an examination of the income inequality hiding behind Chattanooga's rise as the shining star of the South—reporting that combined data, research and human stories to render a full picture of poverty."
2017	Staff	National Geographic	"for a deep and sensitive exploration of gender worldwide, using remarkable photography, moving video and clear writing to illuminate a subject that is at once familiar and misunderstood."
2018	Staff	The Arizona Republic	"for vivid and timely reporting that masterfully combined text, video, podcasts and virtual reality to examine, from multiple perspectives, the difficulties and unintended consequences of fulfilling President Trump's pledge to construct a wall along the U.S. border with Mexico."
2018	Staff	USA Today	"for vivid and timely reporting that masterfully combined text, video, podcasts and virtual reality to examine, from multiple perspectives, the difficulties and unintended consequences of fulfilling President Trump's pledge to construct a wall along the U.S. border with Mexico."
2018	Michael Kimmelman	The New York Times	"for an ambitious series that explained with verve, lyricism and exceptional clarity the complex impact of climate change on cities around the world."
2018	Staff	ProPublica	"for a sobering examination of why the United States has one of the highest rates of maternal deaths in the developed world, and why at least half are preventable."
2019	David Barstow	The New York Times	"for an exhaustive 18-month investigation of President Donald Trump's finances that debunked his claims of self-made wealth and revealed a business empire riddled with tax dodges."
2019	Russ Buettner	The New York Times	"for an exhaustive 18-month investigation of President Donald Trump's finances that debunked his claims of self-made wealth and revealed a business empire riddled with tax dodges."
2019	Susanne Craig	The New York Times	"for an exhaustive 18-month investigation of President Donald Trump's finances that debunked his claims of self-made wealth and revealed a business empire riddled with tax dodges."
2019	Aaron Glantz	The Center for Investigative Reporting (Note: Under Reveal in collaboration with the Associated Press, Public Radio Exchange and PBS News Hour.)	"for an exposé of redlining that analyzed more than 30 million mortgage records to uncover discrimination in the banking system, highlighting how skin color still shuts out millions of people from home ownership."
2019	Emmanuel Martinez	The Center for Investigative Reporting	"for an exposé of redlining that analyzed more than 30 million mortgage records to uncover discrimination in the banking system, highlighting how skin color still shuts out millions of people from home ownership."
2019	Kyra Gurney	Miami Herald	"for an ambitious explanation of a far-reaching criminal operation in which South American gold mining fueled international money laundering, urban street crime, environmental degradation, child exploitation, drug trafficking and a thriving precious metals industry in Miami."
2019	Nicholas Nehamas	Miami Herald	"for an ambitious explanation of a far-reaching criminal operation in which South American gold mining fueled international money laundering, urban street crime, environmental degradation, child exploitation, drug trafficking and a thriving precious metals industry in Miami."
2019	Jay Weaver	Miami Herald	"for an ambitious explanation of a far-reaching criminal operation in which South American gold mining fueled international money laundering, urban street crime, environmental degradation, child exploitation, drug trafficking and a thriving precious metals industry in Miami."
2019	Jim Wyss	Miami Herald	"for an ambitious explanation of a far-reaching criminal operation in which South American gold mining fueled international money laundering, urban street crime, environmental degradation, child exploitation, drug trafficking and a thriving precious metals industry in Miami."
2019	Staff	The Washington Post	"for exhaustive data analysis and haunting storytelling that revealed the vast number of unsolved homicide cases in America's major cities."
2020	Staff	The Washington Post	"for a groundbreaking series that showed with scientific clarity the dire effects of extreme temperatures on the planet."
2020	Terry Castleman	Los Angeles Times	"for a deeply researched examination of the difficult choices Californians must make as climate change erodes precious coastline."
2020	Swetha Kannan	Los Angeles Times	"for a deeply researched examination of the difficult choices Californians must make as climate change erodes precious coastline."
2020	Rosanna Xia	Los Angeles Times	"for a deeply researched examination of the difficult choices Californians must make as climate change erodes precious coastline."
2020	Staff	The Center for Investigative Reporting (Note: Under Reveal.)	"for its industrious reporting on worker injuries and the human toll of robotics technology at Amazon warehouses across the United States."
2021	Jackie Botts	Reuters	"for an exhaustive examination, powered by a pioneering data analysis of U.S. federal court cases, of the obscure legal doctrine of 'qualified immunity' and how it shields police who use excessive force from prosecution."
2021	Andrew Chung	Reuters	"for an exhaustive examination, powered by a pioneering data analysis of U.S. federal court cases, of the obscure legal doctrine of 'qualified immunity' and how it shields police who use excessive force from prosecution."
2021	Jaimi Dowdell	Reuters	"for an exhaustive examination, powered by a pioneering data analysis of U.S. federal court cases, of the obscure legal doctrine of 'qualified immunity' and how it shields police who use excessive force from prosecution."
2021	Lawrence Hurley	Reuters	"for an exhaustive examination, powered by a pioneering data analysis of U.S. federal court cases, of the obscure legal doctrine of 'qualified immunity' and how it shields police who use excessive force from prosecution."
2021	Andrea Januta	Reuters	"for an exhaustive examination, powered by a pioneering data analysis of U.S. federal court cases, of the obscure legal doctrine of 'qualified immunity' and how it shields police who use excessive force from prosecution."
2021	Ed Yong	The Atlantic	"for a series of lucid, definitive pieces on the COVID-19 pandemic that anticipated the course of the disease, synthesized the complex challenges the country faced, illuminated the U.S. government's failures and provided clear and accessible context for the scientific and human challenges it posed."
2021	Christo Buschek	BuzzFeed News	"for a series of clear and compelling stories that used satellite imagery and architectural expertise, as well as interviews with two dozen former prisoners, to identify a vast new infrastructure built by the Chinese government for the mass detention of Muslims."
2021	Alison Killing	BuzzFeed News	"for a series of clear and compelling stories that used satellite imagery and architectural expertise, as well as interviews with two dozen former prisoners, to identify a vast new infrastructure built by the Chinese government for the mass detention of Muslims."
2021	Megha Rajagopalan	BuzzFeed News	"for a series of clear and compelling stories that used satellite imagery and architectural expertise, as well as interviews with two dozen former prisoners, to identify a vast new infrastructure built by the Chinese government for the mass detention of Muslims."
2022	Natalie Wolchover	Quanta Magazine	"for coverage that revealed the complexities of building the James Webb Space Telescope, designed to facilitate groundbreaking astronomical and cosmological research."
2022	Staff	Quanta Magazine	"for coverage that revealed the complexities of building the James Webb Space Telescope, designed to facilitate groundbreaking astronomical and cosmological research."
2022	Staff	The Philadelphia Inquirer	"for a richly reported series that, with compelling writing and photography, tackled the complex roots of gun violence in the city, centering on the people and communities most affected by it."
2022	Staff	The Wall Street Journal	"for stories that vividly reconstructed the 1921 Tulsa race massacre and illuminated its enduring effects, describing how the destruction of Black wealth and property burdened future generations."
2023	Caitlin Dickerson	The Atlantic	"for deeply reported and compelling accounting of the Trump administration policy that forcefully separated migrant children from their parents, resulting in abuses that have persisted under the current administration."
2023	Duaa Eldeib	ProPublica	"for poignant, comprehensive reporting that clearly demonstrated how the U.S. healthcare system has failed to lower the number of preventable stillbirths in the country."
2023	Terrence McCoy	The Washington Post	"for his sweeping examination of the destruction of the Amazon, using rich data and images, that explores the conflicts between those people who see it as their birthright to exploit the area, those who seek to preserve indigenous communities and those desperate to protect the earth."
2024	Sarah Stillman	The New Yorker	"for a searing indictment of our legal system's reliance on the felony murder charge and its disparate consequences, often devastating for communities of color."
2024	Staff	Bloomberg News	"for rigorous, far-reaching reporting that holds corporate water profiteers to account and exposes how they willfully exacerbate the effects of climate change at the expense of less powerful communities."
2024	Staff	Frontline	"for advancing understanding of law enforcement's catastrophic response to the mass shooting at a Uvalde, Texas elementary school and also for documenting the political and policy shortcomings that have led to similar deadly police failures across the country."
2024	Staff	ProPublica	"for advancing understanding of law enforcement's catastrophic response to the mass shooting at a Uvalde, Texas elementary school and also for documenting the political and policy shortcomings that have led to similar deadly police failures across the country."
2024	Staff	The Texas Tribune	"for advancing understanding of law enforcement's catastrophic response to the mass shooting at a Uvalde, Texas elementary school and also for documenting the political and policy shortcomings that have led to similar deadly police failures across the country."
2025	Azam Ahmed	The New York Times	"for an authoritative examination of how the United States sowed the seeds of its own failure in Afghanistan, primarily by supporting murderous militia that drove civilians to the Taliban."
2025	Matthieu Aikins	The New York Times	"for an authoritative examination of how the United States sowed the seeds of its own failure in Afghanistan, primarily by supporting murderous militia that drove civilians to the Taliban."
2025	Christina Goldbaum	The New York Times	"for an authoritative examination of how the United States sowed the seeds of its own failure in Afghanistan, primarily by supporting murderous militia that drove civilians to the Taliban."
2025	Alexia Campbell	Center for Public Integrity	"for using innovative technology, archival research and personal storytelling to reveal how land titles granted to formerly enslaved Black men and women in the wake of the Civil War were unjustly revoked."
2025	Pratheek Rebala	Center for Public Integrity	"for using innovative technology, archival research and personal storytelling to reveal how land titles granted to formerly enslaved Black men and women in the wake of the Civil War were unjustly revoked."
2025	April Simpson	Center for Public Integrity	"for using innovative technology, archival research and personal storytelling to reveal how land titles granted to formerly enslaved Black men and women in the wake of the Civil War were unjustly revoked."
2025	Nadia Hamdan	Reveal	"for using innovative technology, archival research and personal storytelling to reveal how land titles granted to formerly enslaved Black men and women in the wake of the Civil War were unjustly revoked."
2025	Roy Hurst	Mother Jones	"for using innovative technology, archival research and personal storytelling to reveal how land titles granted to formerly enslaved Black men and women in the wake of the Civil War were unjustly revoked."
2025	Max Blau	ProPublica	"for a deep and haunting examination of how insurance companies quietly, and with little public scrutiny, deny mental health services to those in need."
2025	Duaa Eldeib	ProPublica	"for a deep and haunting examination of how insurance companies quietly, and with little public scrutiny, deny mental health services to those in need."
2025	Maya Miller	ProPublica	"for a deep and haunting examination of how insurance companies quietly, and with little public scrutiny, deny mental health services to those in need."
2025	Annie Waldman	ProPublica	"for a deep and haunting examination of how insurance companies quietly, and with little public scrutiny, deny mental health services to those in need."
2026	Sara DiNatale	San Francisco Chronicle	"for their series 'Burned,' which showed how insurance companies using algorithmic tools have failed Californians who lost their homes to fire by systematically undervaluing their properties, denying claims and making it impossible for them to rebuild."
2026	Megan Fan Munce	San Francisco Chronicle	"for their series 'Burned,' which showed how insurance companies using algorithmic tools have failed Californians who lost their homes to fire by systematically undervaluing their properties, denying claims and making it impossible for them to rebuild."
2026	Susie Neilson	San Francisco Chronicle	"for their series 'Burned,' which showed how insurance companies using algorithmic tools have failed Californians who lost their homes to fire by systematically undervaluing their properties, denying claims and making it impossible for them to rebuild."
2026	Anna Maria Barry-Jester	ProPublica	"for an authoritative and consequential examination of the Trump administration's freeze of humanitarian aid through the U.S. Agency for International Development, coverage that illuminated how the dismantling of the agency placed hundreds of thousands of people at risk, contradicted official assurances that lifesaving programs remained active and led to preventable deaths."
2026	Brett Murphy	ProPublica	"for an authoritative and consequential examination of the Trump administration's freeze of humanitarian aid through the U.S. Agency for International Development, coverage that illuminated how the dismantling of the agency placed hundreds of thousands of people at risk, contradicted official assurances that lifesaving programs remained active and led to preventable deaths."
2026	Staff	Bloomberg News	"for reporting on a new generation of so-called 'revolutionary' cancer drugs that revealed how pharmaceutical companies, lobbyists and medical entrepreneurs have reaped huge profits while failing to show that the drugs have extended people's lives."

== See also ==
- List of journalism awards
