= 1994 Pulitzer Prize =

Awards for journalism and related fields

The following are the Pulitzer Prizes for 1994.

== Journalism awards ==
- Public Service:
  - Akron Beacon Journal, for its broad examination of local racial attitudes and its subsequent effort to promote improved communication in the community.
- Spot News Reporting:
  - Staff of The New York Times, for its comprehensive coverage of the bombing of Manhattan's World Trade Center.
- Investigative Reporting:
  - Staff of The Providence Journal-Bulletin, for thorough reporting that disclosed pervasive corruption within the Rhode Island court system.
- Explanatory Journalism:
  - Ronald Kotulak of the Chicago Tribune, for his lucid coverage of current developments in neurological science.
- Beat Reporting:
  - Eric Freedman and Jim Mitzelfeld of The Detroit News, for dogged reporting that disclosed flagrant spending abuses at Michigan's House Fiscal Agency.
- National Reporting:
  - Eileen Welsome of The Albuquerque Tribune, for stories that related the experiences of Americans who had been used unknowingly in government radiation experiments nearly 50 years ago.
- International Reporting:
  - Dallas Morning News Team of The Dallas Morning News, for its series examining the epidemic of violence against women in many nations.
- Feature Writing:
  - Isabel Wilkerson of The New York Times, for her profile of a fourth-grader from Chicago's South Side and for two stories reporting on the Midwestern flood of 1993.
- Commentary:
  - William Raspberry of The Washington Post, for his compelling commentaries on a variety of social and political topics.
- Criticism:
  - Lloyd Schwartz of the Boston Phoenix, a weekly, for his skillful and resonant classical music criticism.
- Editorial Writing:
  - R. Bruce Dold of the Chicago Tribune, for his series of editorials deploring the murder of a 3-year-old boy by his abusive mother and decrying the Illinois child welfare system.
- Editorial Cartooning:
  - Michael P. Ramirez of The Commercial Appeal, Memphis, Tennessee, for his trenchant cartoons on contemporary issues.
- Spot News Photography:
  - Paul Watson of the Toronto Star, for his photograph, published in many American newspapers, of a U.S. soldier's body being dragged through the streets of Mogadishu by a mob of jeering Somalis.
- Feature Photography:
  - Kevin Carter, a freelance photographer, for a picture first published in The New York Times of a starving Sudanese girl who collapsed on her way to a feeding center while a vulture waited nearby.

== Letters awards ==
- Fiction:
  - The Shipping News by E. Annie Proulx (Charles Scribner's Sons)
- History:
  - no award
- Biography or Autobiography:
  - W.E.B. Du Bois: Biography of a Race 1868-1919 by David Levering Lewis (Henry Holt)
- Poetry:
  - Neon Vernacular: New and Selected Poems by Yusef Komunyakaa (Wesleyan University Press)
- General Nonfiction:
  - Lenin's Tomb: The Last Days of the Soviet Empire by David Remnick (Random House)

== Arts awards ==
- Drama:
  - Three Tall Women by Edward Albee (Dutton)
- Music:
  - Of Reminiscences and Reflections by Gunther Schuller (Associated Music Publishers)

Premiered on December 2, 1993, in Louisville, Kentucky. Performed and commissioned by The Louisville Orchestra.
