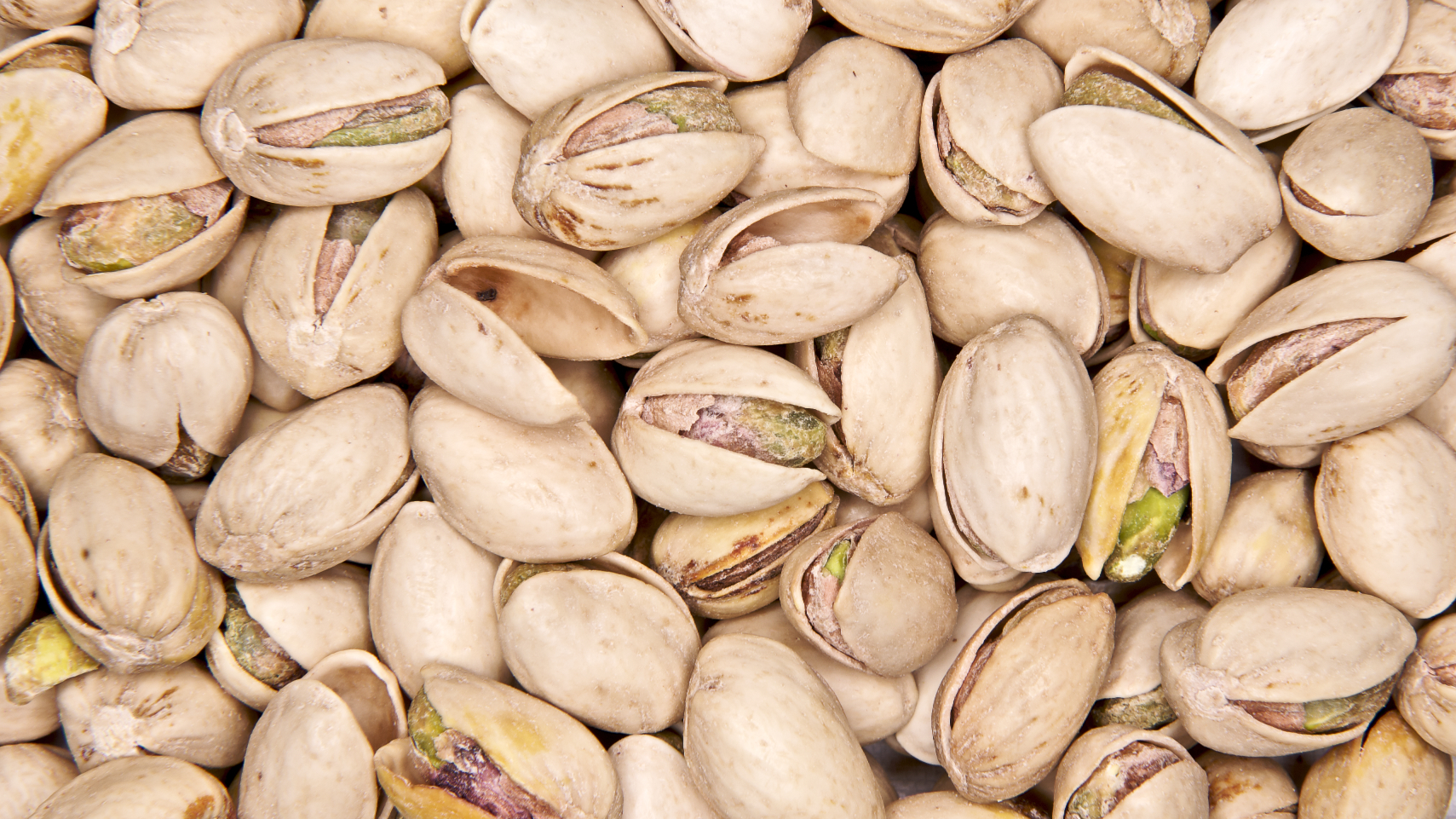

Conservation status
- Near Threatened (IUCN 3.1)

Scientific classification
- Kingdom: Plantae
- Clade: Tracheophytes
- Clade: Angiosperms
- Clade: Eudicots
- Clade: Rosids
- Order: Sapindales
- Family: Anacardiaceae
- Genus: Pistacia
- Species: P. vera

Binomial name
- Pistacia vera L.

= Pistachio =

Member of the cashew family

The pistachio (/pɪˈstɑːʃioʊ, -ˈstæʃ-/, UK also /pɪˈstætʃ(i)oʊ/; Pistacia vera) is a small to medium-sized tree of the cashew family. The tree produces seeds that are widely consumed as food. Pistachios can be used as an ingredient in desserts, chocolate, candy, ice cream, and as a paste or butter. As a tree nut, pistachios are considered a priority allergen that may induce allergic reactions in susceptible people.

In 2024 the world production of pistachios was 1.4 million tonnes, with the United States, Iran, and Turkey combined accounting for 87% of the total.

== Description ==
The tree grows up to 10 metres (33 feet) tall. It has deciduous, pinnate leaves 10–20 centimetres (4–8 inches) long. The plants are dioecious, with separate male and female trees. The flowers are apetalous and unisexual and borne in panicles.

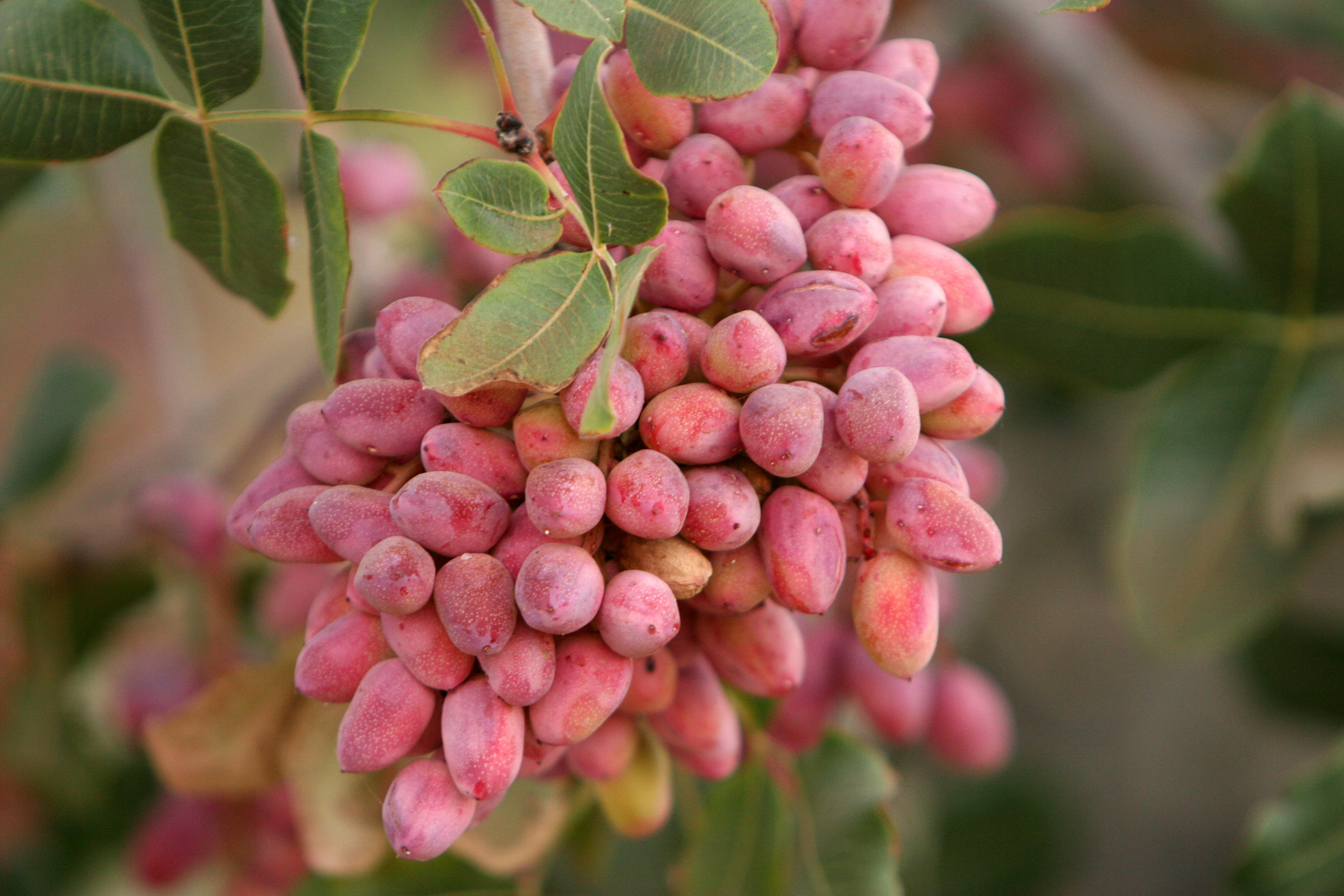
Pistachios growing in Iran in 2007. The fruits have not yet begun to open.

The fruit is a drupe, containing an elongated seed, which is the edible portion. The seed, commonly thought of as a nut, is a culinary nut, not a botanical nut. The fruit has a hard, cream-colored exterior shell. The seed has a mauve-colored skin and light green flesh, with a distinctive flavor. When the fruit ripens, the shell changes from green to an autumnal yellow/red and abruptly splits partly open. This is known as dehiscence and happens with an audible pop. Humans selected the trait of splitting open. Commercial cultivars vary in how consistently they split open.

Each mature pistachio tree averages around 50 kilograms (110 pounds) of seeds, or around 50,000 seeds, every two years.

== Etymology ==
Pistachio is from late Middle English pistace, from Old French, superseded in the 16th century by forms from Italian pistacchio, via Latin from Greek πιστάκιον pistákion, ultimately deriving from Middle Persian pistakē, meaning "pestle" (cf. pesto).

== Distribution and habitat ==
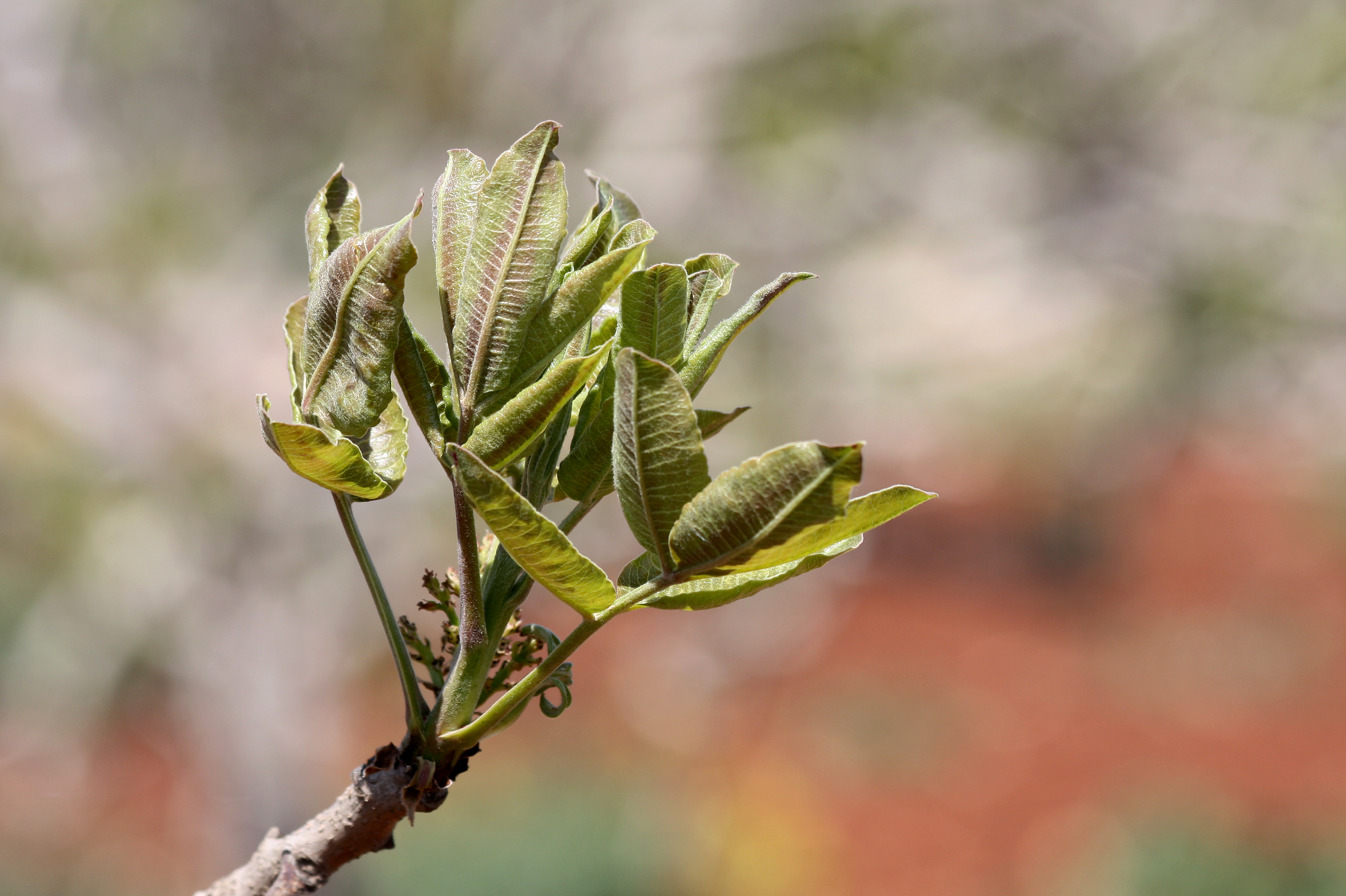
Leaves of the pistachio tree

Pistachio is a desert plant and is highly tolerant of saline soil. It has been reported to grow well when irrigated with water having 3,000–4,000 ppm of soluble salts. Pistachio trees are fairly hardy in the right conditions and can survive temperatures ranging between −10 °C (14 °F) in winter and 48 °C (118 °F) in summer. They need a sunny position and well-drained soil. Pistachio trees do poorly in high humidity conditions and are susceptible to root rot in winter if they get too much water and the soil is not sufficiently free-draining. Long, hot summers are required for proper ripening of the fruit.

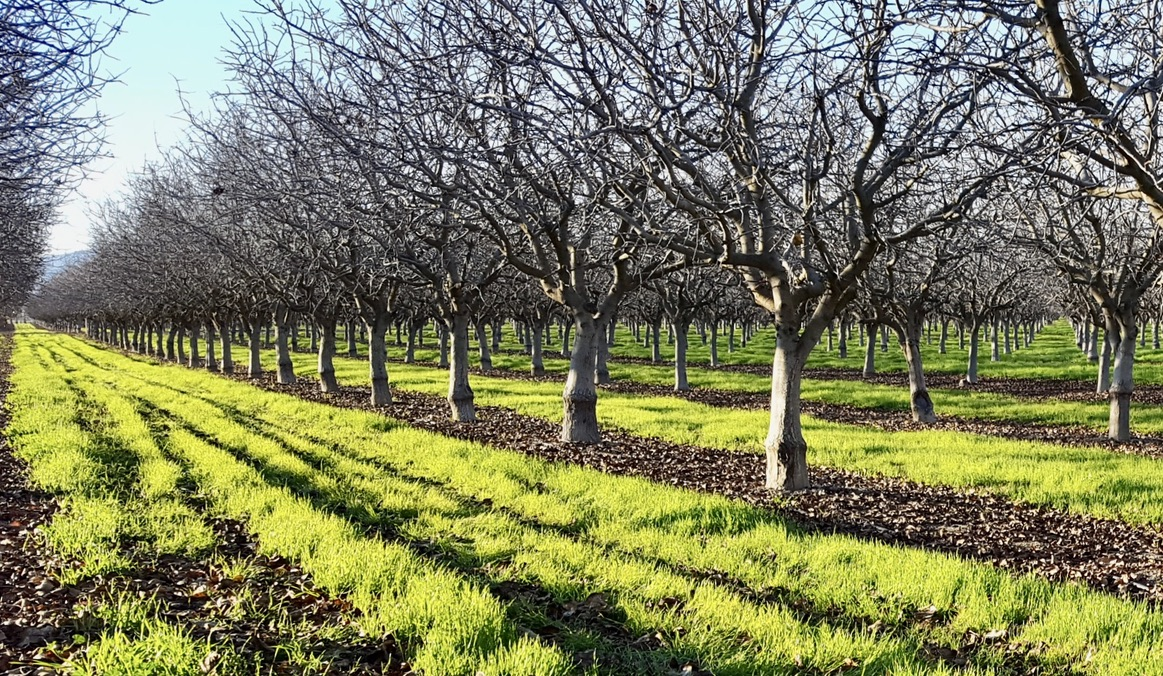
Dormant pistachio trees, California

== Cultivation ==
The pistachio tree may live up to 300 years. The trees are planted in orchards, and take around 7 to 10 years to reach significant production. Production is alternate-bearing (biennial-bearing), meaning the harvest is heavier in alternate years. Peak production is reached around 20 years. Trees are usually pruned to size to make the harvest easier. One male tree produces enough pollen for 8 to 12 drupe-bearing females. In the United States and Greece, the fruit is often harvested with equipment to shake the drupes off the tree. After hulling and drying, pistachios are sorted according to open-mouth and closed-mouth shells, then roasted or processed by special machines to produce pistachio kernels.

=== Diseases and environment ===
Pistachio trees are vulnerable to numerous diseases and infestation by insects such as Leptoglossus clypealis in North America. Among these is infection by the fungus Botryosphaeria, which causes panicle and shoot blight (symptoms include death of the flowers and young shoots), and can damage entire pistachio orchards. In 2004, the rapidly growing pistachio industry in California was threatened by panicle and shoot blight first discovered in 1984. In 2011, anthracnose fungus caused a sudden 50% loss in the Australian pistachio harvest. Several years of severe drought in Iran around 2008 to 2015 caused significant declines in production.

== Production ==
Pistachio production 2024, tonnes
United States	498,950
Turkey	383,000
Iran	316,142
Syria	83,796
China	78,986
World	1,380,321
Source: FAOSTAT of the United Nations

In 2024, world production of pistachios (in shells) was 1.4 million tonnes (3.1 billion pounds), with the United States, Turkey, and Iran together accounting for 87% of the total (table).

In 2023, the state of California produced 99% of the pistachios grown in the United States, with more than 428,000 acres (173,000 ha) devoted to the crop in 2022.

Production of pistachios

Pistachio yield

=== Water needs ===
In a typical California orchard of 1 acre (0.40 ha), pistachios require over 1,000,000 US gal (3,800,000 L) of water per year, an amount adding stress to the state's water problem. Nearly all California pistachios grow in state regions classified as having extremely high water stress.

== Toxicity ==
As with other tree seeds, aflatoxin is found in poorly harvested or processed pistachios. Aflatoxins are potent carcinogens produced by molds such as Aspergillus flavus and A. parasiticus. The mold contamination may occur from soil or poor storage and be spread by pests. High levels of mold growth typically appear as gray to black filament-like growth. Eating mold-infected and aflatoxin-contaminated pistachios is unsafe. Aflatoxin contamination is a frequent risk, particularly in warmer and humid environments. Food contaminated with aflatoxins has caused frequent outbreaks of acute illnesses in parts of the world. In some cases, such as in Kenya, this has led to several deaths.

Pistachio shells typically split naturally before harvest, with a hull covering the intact seeds. The hull protects the kernel from invasion by molds and insects, but this hull protection can be damaged in the orchard by poor orchard management practices, by birds, or after harvest, which makes exposure to contamination much easier. Some pistachios undergo a so-called "early split", wherein both the hull and the shell split. Damage or early splits can lead to aflatoxin contamination. In some cases, a harvest may be treated to keep contamination below strict food safety thresholds; in other cases, an entire batch of pistachios must be destroyed because of aflatoxin contamination.

Like other members of the family Anacardiaceae (which includes poison ivy, sumac, mango, and cashew), pistachios contain urushiol, an irritant that can cause allergic skin reactions.

Large quantities of pistachios are self-heating in the presence of moisture due to their high oil content in addition to naturally occurring lipases, and can spontaneously combust if stored with a combustible fabric such as jute.

=== Priority allergen ===
Pistachios are included among other tree nuts as a priority allergen that may cause severe allergic reactions in susceptible people. An allergic reaction to pistachio consumption may lead to anaphylaxis, having symptoms such as hives or swelling of the face, lips, or tongue, coughing or shortness of breath, and upset stomach, among other effects.

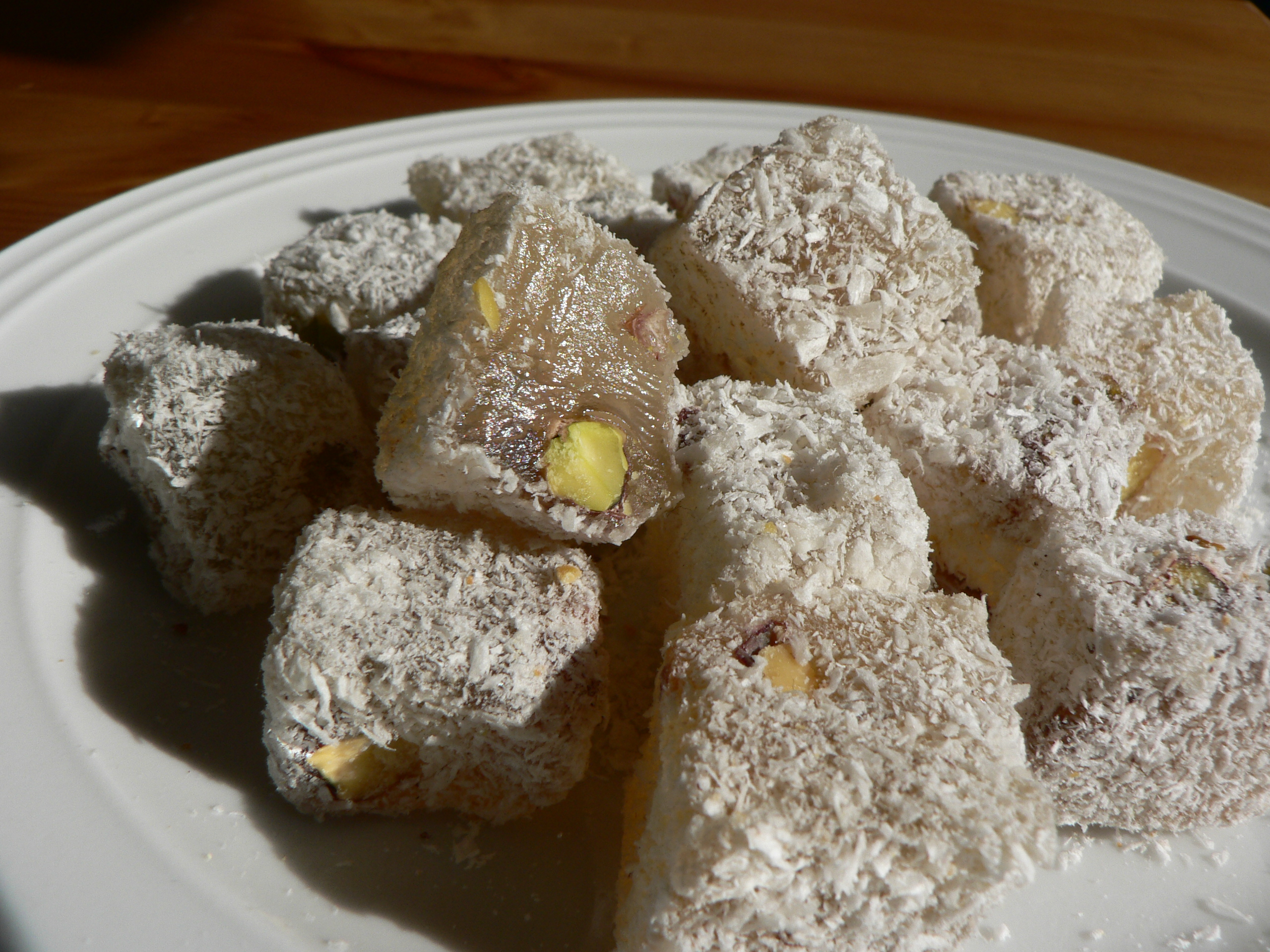
Turkish delight

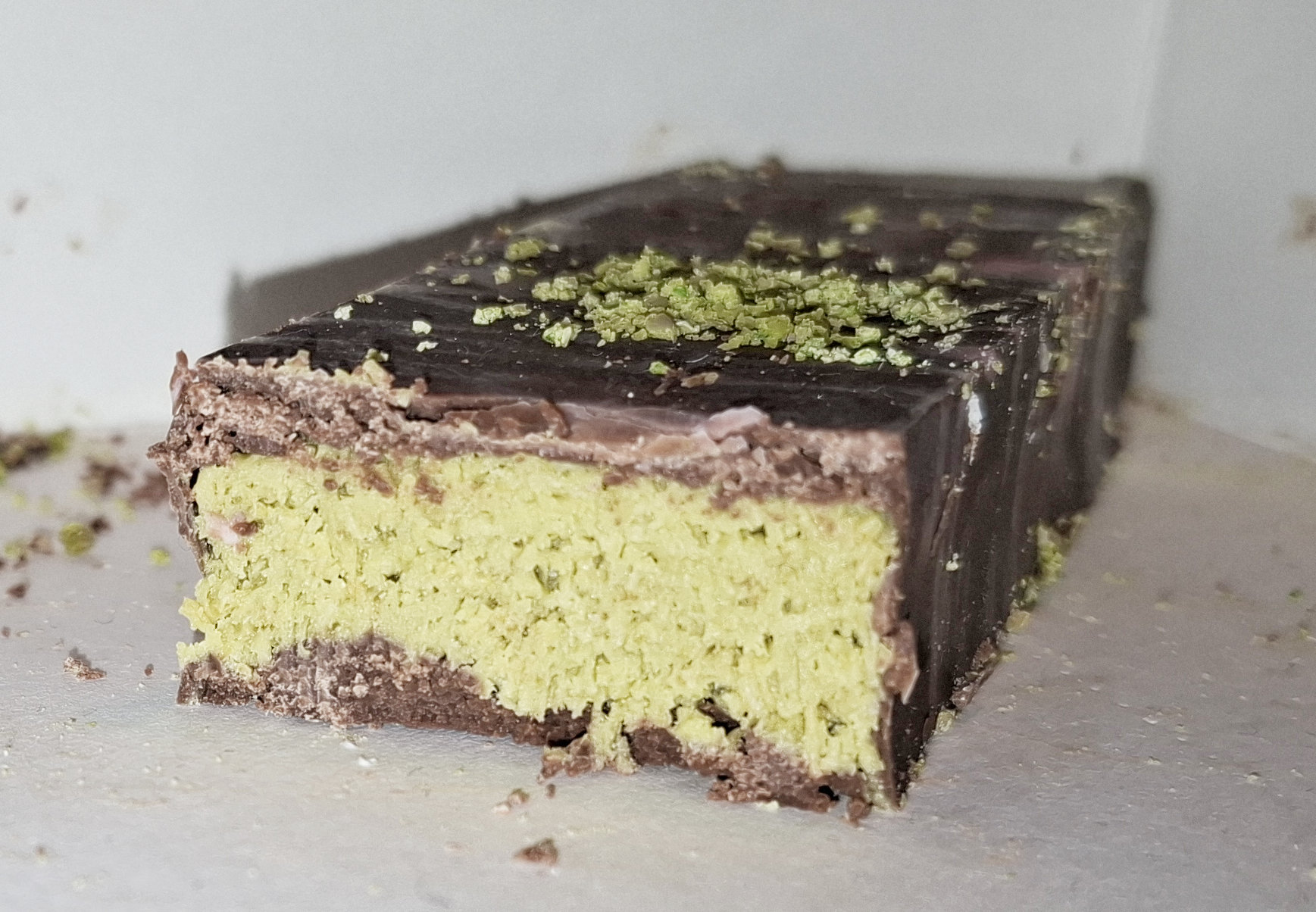
Dubai chocolate showing pistachio filling

== Uses ==
The kernels are often eaten whole, either fresh or roasted and salted, and are also used in Turkish delight candy, pistachio ice cream, traditional Persian ice cream, kulfi, spumoni, pistachio butter, pistachio paste, and confections such as baklava, pistachio chocolate, pistachio halva, pistachio lokum or biscotti, and cold cuts, such as mortadella. Americans make pistachio salad, which includes fresh pistachios or pistachio pudding, whipped cream, and canned fruit. Indian cooking uses pounded pistachios with grilled meats, and in pulao rice dishes.

The shell of the pistachio is naturally a beige color, but it may be dyed red or green in commercial pistachios. Originally, dye was applied to hide stains on the shells caused when the nuts were picked by hand. In the 21st century, most pistachios are harvested by machine and the shells remain unstained.

== Nutrition ==
Pistachio nuts, raw
Nutritional value per 100 g (3.5 oz)
- Energy: 2,351 kJ (562 kcal)
- Carbohydrates: 27.51 g
- Sugars: 7.66 g
- Dietary fiber: 10.3 g
- Fat: 45.39 g
- Saturated: 5.556 g
- Monounsaturated: 23.820 g
- Polyunsaturated: 13.744 g
- Protein: 20.27 g
Vitamins and minerals
Vitamins	Quantity %DV^{†}
Vitamin A equiv. lutein zeaxanthin	1205 μg
Thiamine (B1)	73% 0.87 mg
Riboflavin (B2)	12% 0.160 mg
Niacin (B3)	8% 1.300 mg
Pantothenic acid (B5)	10% 0.52 mg
Vitamin B6	100% 1.700 mg
Folate (B9)	13% 51 μg
Vitamin C	6% 5.6 mg
Vitamin D	0% 0 μg
Vitamin E	15% 2.3 mg
Vitamin K	11% 13.2 μg
Minerals	Quantity %DV^{†}
Calcium	8% 105 mg
Iron	22% 3.92 mg
Magnesium	29% 121 mg
Manganese	52% 1.2 mg
Phosphorus	39% 490 mg
Potassium	34% 1025 mg
Zinc	20% 2.2 mg
- Other constituents: Quantity
- Water: 4 g
- Link to USDA database entry
- ^{†}Percentages estimated using US recommendations for adults, except for potassium, which is estimated based on expert recommendation from the National Academies.

Raw pistachios are 4% water, 45% fat, 28% carbohydrates, and 20% protein (table). In a 100-gram reference amount, pistachios provide 2,351 kilojoules (562 kcal) of food energy. They are a rich source (20% or more of the Daily Value or DV) of protein, dietary fiber, several dietary minerals, and the B vitamins thiamin (73% DV) and vitamin B_{6} (100% DV) (table). Pistachios are a moderate source (10–19% DV) of riboflavin, vitamin B_{5}, folate, vitamin E, and vitamin K (table).

The fat profile of raw pistachios consists mainly of monounsaturated fats and polyunsaturated fats, with a small amount of saturated fats (table). Saturated fatty acids include palmitic acid (10% of total) and stearic acid (2%) (table). Oleic acid is the most common monounsaturated fatty acid (52% of total fat), and linoleic acid, a polyunsaturated fatty acid, is 30% of total fat.

Relative to other tree nuts, pistachios have a lower amount of fat and food energy, but higher amounts of potassium, vitamin K, γ-tocopherol, and certain phytochemicals such as carotenoids, and phytosterols.

=== Research and health effects ===
In July 2003, the United States Food and Drug Administration approved the first qualified health claim specific to consumption of seeds (including pistachios) to lower the risk of heart disease: "Scientific evidence suggests but does not prove that eating 1.5 ounces (42.5 g) per day of most nuts, such as pistachios, as part of a diet low in saturated fat and cholesterol may reduce the risk of heart disease". Although a typical serving of pistachios supplies substantial food energy (nutrition table), their consumption in normal amounts is not associated with weight gain or obesity.

One review found that pistachio consumption lowered blood pressure in persons without diabetes mellitus.

A 2021 review found that pistachio consumption for three months or less significantly reduced triglyceride levels.

== History ==
The pistachio tree is native to Iran and Central Asia.

Archaeological evidence shows that pistachio seeds were a common food as early as 6750 BCE. The earliest archeological evidence of pistachio production goes back to the Bronze Age Central Asia and comes from Djarkutan, modern Uzbekistan.

The Hanging Gardens of Babylon were said to have contained pistachio trees during the reign of King Marduk-apla-iddina II about 700 BCE.

The Romans introduced pistachio trees from Asia to Europe in the first century CE. They are cultivated across Southern Europe and North Africa.

Theophrastus described it as a terebinth-like tree with almond-like nuts from Bactria.

It appears in Dioscorides' writings as pistákia (πιστάκια), recognizable as P. vera by its comparison to pine nuts.

Pliny the Elder wrote in his Natural History that pistacia, "well known among us", was one of the trees unique to Syria, and that the seed was introduced into Italy by the Roman proconsul in Syria, Lucius Vitellius the Elder (in office in 35 CE), and into Hispania at the same time by Flaccus Pompeius.

The manuscript De observatione ciborum (On the Observance of Foods) by Anthimus, from the early sixth century, implies that pistacia remained well-known in Europe in late antiquity.

An article on pistachio tree cultivation was brought down in Ibn al-'Awwam's 12th-century agricultural work, Book on Agriculture.

Archaeologists have found evidence from excavations at Jarmo in northeastern Iraq for the consumption of Atlantic pistachio.

=== Modern ===
In the 19th century, the pistachio was cultivated commercially in parts of the English-speaking world, including Australia and the United States, in the states of New Mexico and California, where it had been introduced as a garden tree in 1854.

In 1904 and 1905, David Fairchild of the United States Department of Agriculture introduced hardier cultivars to California collected from China, but it was not promoted as a commercial crop until 1929. Walter T. Swingle's pistachios from Syria had already fruited well at Niles, California, by 1917.

The first commercial pistachio harvest in California took place in 1976. By 2008, U.S. pistachio production rivaled that of Iran. Drought and cold weather in Iran led to severe declines in production, while U.S. production was increasing. At that time, pistachios were Iran's second-most important export product, after the oil and gas sector.

By 2020, there were 150,000 pistachio farmers in Iran, approximately 70% of whom were small-scale producers using inefficient manual picking and processing techniques. There were 950 far larger U.S. producers, using highly efficient mechanized production techniques.

== See also ==
- List of culinary nuts
- Pistacia lentiscus
