= William Snyder (photojournalist) =

American photojournalist

William Snyder is an American photojournalist who has received three Pulitzer Prizes for his journalism.

In 1989, Snyder won a Pulitzer Prize for Explanatory Journalism, along with reporter David Hanners and artist Karen Blessen, for their special report on a 1985 airplane crash, the follow-up investigation, and the implications for air safety. In 1991, he won the Pulitzer Prize for Feature Photography for his pictures of ill and orphaned children living in desperate conditions in Romania. In 1993, Snyder and Ken Geiger won the Pulitzer Prize for Spot News Photography for their photographic coverage of the 1992 Summer Olympics in Barcelona, Spain.

As director of photography for The Dallas Morning News, he oversaw the photo staff's 2006 Pulitzer-winning coverage of Hurricane Katrina. In 2008, Snyder took a buyout at the newspaper.

He returned to his alma mater, the Rochester Institute of Technology, where he served as the chair in the Photojournalism BFA program, then as the Undergraduate Program Director for Advertising Photography.
