= Gregory Kane (journalist) =

American journalist (d. 2014)

- Born: Gregory Phillip Kane c. 1951; Baltimore, Maryland, U.S.
- Died: February 18, 2014 (aged 62); Baltimore, Maryland, U.S.
- Education: Baltimore City College; Franklin & Marshall College; University of Maryland; Towson University; American University
- Occupation(s): Journalist, commentator
- Notable credit(s): The Baltimore Sun; The Baltimore Examiner; The Washington Examiner
- Spouse: Veronica White Kane (m. 1984)
- Children: 3

Gregory Phillip Kane (c. 1951 – February 18, 2014) was an American journalist and political and social commentator.

== Background ==
Kane was born in Baltimore and grew up in West Baltimore. He attended Baltimore City Public Schools and graduated from the Baltimore City College high school in 1969.

== Career ==
Kane began his journalism career in 1984 as a freelance writer for The Baltimore Sun, and became a staff writer for the newspaper from 1993 to 2008. In 2008, The Baltimore Examiner hired him as a columnist. After The Baltimore Examiner closed in 2009, he began writing for its sister newspaper, The Washington Examiner, where he wrote until his death. Kane was also a visiting professor at the Writing Seminars at Johns Hopkins University. Kane died on February 18, 2014, after a battle with cancer.

=== Awards ===
In 1997, Kane was nominated along with Baltimore Sun reporter Gilbert Lewthwaite for the Pulitzer Prize in Explanatory Journalism for a three-part series about slavery in Sudan. Both men won the Overseas Press Club award for best reporting on human rights and an award from the National Association of Black Journalists for the series.

Kane has also won several awards from Baltimore magazine, the Press Club of Atlantic City, and the Maryland chapter of the Society of Professional Journalists.

A moving letter-tribute to Kane appeared in the February 22, 2014, Baltimore Sun.
