= 1989 Pulitzer Prize =

Awards for journalism and related fields

Below are the winners of the 1989 Pulitzer Prize by category.

== Journalism awards ==
- Public Service:
  - Anchorage Daily News, for reporting about the high incidence of alcoholism and suicide among native Alaskans in a series that focused attention on their despair and resulted in various reforms.
- General News Reporting:
  - Staff of Louisville Courier-Journal, for its exemplary initial coverage of a bus crash that claimed 27 lives and its subsequent thorough and effective examination of the causes and implications of the tragedy.
- Investigative Reporting:
  - Bill Dedman of The Atlanta Journal-Constitution, for his investigation of the racial discrimination practiced by lending institutions in Atlanta, reporting which led to significant reforms in those policies.
- Explanatory Journalism:
  - David Hanners, reporter, William Snyder, photographer, and Karen Blessen, artist of The Dallas Morning News, for their special report on a 1985 airplane crash, the follow-up investigation, and the implications for air safety.
- Specialized Reporting:
  - Edward Humes of the Orange County Register, for his in-depth reporting on the military establishment in Southern California.
- National Reporting:
  - Donald L. Barlett and James B. Steele of The Philadelphia Inquirer, for their 15-month investigation of rifle shot provisions in the Tax Reform Act of 1986, a series that aroused such widespread public indignation that Congress subsequently rejected proposals giving special tax breaks to many politically connected individuals and businesses.
- International Reporting:
  - Bill Keller of The New York Times, for resourceful and detailed coverage of events in the U.S.S.R.
- International Reporting:
  - Glenn Frankel of The Washington Post, for sensitive and balanced reporting from Israel and the Middle East.
- Feature Writing:
  - David Zucchino of The Philadelphia Inquirer, for his richly compelling series, Being Black in South Africa.
- Commentary:
  - Clarence Page of the Chicago Tribune, for his provocative columns on local and national affairs.
- Criticism:
  - Michael Skube of the News & Observer, Raleigh, North Carolina, for his writing about books and other literary topics.
- Editorial Writing:
  - Lois Wille of the Chicago Tribune, for her editorials on a variety of local issues.
- Editorial Cartooning:
  - Jack Higgins of the Chicago Sun-Times.
- Spot News Photography:
  - Ron Olshwanger, a freelance photographer, for a picture published in the St. Louis Post-Dispatch of a firefighter giving mouth-to-mouth resuscitation to a child pulled from a burning building.
- Feature Photography:
  - Manny Crisostomo of the Detroit Free Press, for his series of photographs depicting student life at Southwestern High School in Detroit.

== Letters, Drama and Music Awards ==
- Fiction:
  - Breathing Lessons by Anne Tyler (Alfred A. Knopf)
- Drama:
  - The Heidi Chronicles by Wendy Wasserstein (Fireside Theatre)
- History:
  - Battle Cry of Freedom: The Civil War Era by James M. McPherson (Oxford University Press)
- History:
  - Parting the Waters: America in the King Years 1954-1963 by Taylor Branch (Simon & Schuster)
- Biography or Autobiography:
  - Oscar Wilde by Richard Ellmann (Alfred A. Knopf)
- Poetry:
  - New and Collected Poems by Richard Wilbur (Harcourt Brace Jovanovich)
- General Nonfiction:
  - A Bright Shining Lie: John Paul Vann and America in Vietnam by Neil Sheehan (Random House)
- Music:
  - Whispers Out of Time by Roger Reynolds (C. F. Peters)
    premiered on December 11, 1988, at Buckley Recital Hall, Amherst College, Massachusetts.
