= John M. Crewdson =

American journalist

John M. Crewdson (born December 15, 1945) is an American journalist. He won a Pulitzer Prize for The New York Times, where he worked for 12 years. He subsequently spent 26 years in a variety of positions at the Chicago Tribune.

== Early life ==
He attended public schools in Albany, California. In 1970, Crewdson graduated from the University of California at Berkeley with a bachelor's degree in economics, awarded with Great Distinction. He also received the annual Undergraduate Prize reserved for the most outstanding student of economics. Following his graduation from Berkeley he spent a year as an intern in The New York Times' Washington bureau, followed by a year of graduate study in politics and American constitutional history at Oxford University.

== Career ==
Crewdson joined The New York Times as a staff reporter in Washington after his graduate work at Oxford, and covered the Watergate scandal and later various scandals related to the CIA and the FBI. In 1977 he became a national correspondent based in the newspaper's Houston bureau, where he won the 1981 Pulitzer Prize in national reporting for his coverage of immigration.

In 1982 Crewdson joined the Chicago Tribune as that paper's national news editor, and then its metropolitan editor. After two years in Chicago Crewdson was made the Tribune's chief West Coast correspondent, based in Los Angeles. His coverage of the early days of the AIDS epidemic led, in 1989, to a 55,000-word history of the discovery of the AIDS virus, which won the George Polk Award for medical reporting and prompted several investigations of the claim by the U.S. National Cancer Institute to have discovered HIV as the cause of AIDS. That claim was later discredited, with the Nobel Prize for HIV being awarded instead in 2008 to researchers from the Pasteur Institute of Paris. The U.S.National Institutes of Health agreed to pay the Pasteur Institute several million dollars in royalties from sales of the HIV blood test that Gallo's laboratory had produced with a sample of the virus sent to him for study by Pasteur scientists. In 1990, Crewdson left California to join the Chicago Tribune's Washington bureau. In 1994, he wrote about a scandal in breast cancer research that led to strengthening government scrutiny of clinical trials.

In 1996, Crewdson authored a 12-page special report for the Tribune about commercial airplanes' inadequate medical equipment for passenger health emergencies. That report, which prompted the commercial airlines to begin carrying portable defibrillators and other emergency medical equipment, eventually saved dozens of lives and was one of three finalists for the 1997 Pulitzer Prize for Explanatory Reporting.

Following 9/11 Crewdson published numerous Tribune articles about terrorism, including more than a dozen revealing previously unpublished details of the CIA’s illegal "rendition" of Abu Omar, a Milanese Imam, from Italy to Egypt. AS a result of Crewdson's reporting, Abu Omar was released after four years in an Egyptian prison where he had been held without charges and tortured. More than two dozen American and Italian intelligence officers, including several senior officials, were later convicted of kidnapping in that case by an Italian court.

Crewdson's work and subsequent 2002 book has been used as fodder by a number of HIV/AIDS denialists, including Henry H. Bauer and in the pseudo-documentary House of Numbers despite opening with the line reading "This is not a book about AIDS". The book describes the fall out between Robert Gallo of the National Cancer Institute and scientists at the Pasteur Institute after Gallo claimed credit for the discovery of the HIV virus he received in 1991 and does not contend that HIV/AIDS is a conspiracy or exaggerated.

In 2007, Crewdson wrote an in-depth report on the Israeli attack on the USS Liberty that killed 34 Americans and injured over 170. The piece was entitled, "Tribune Special Report: The Strike on the USS Liberty: New revelations in attack on American spy ship," and the drop deck said, "Veterans, documents suggest U.S., Israel didn't tell full story of deadly '67 incident."

In 2012, Crewdson joined the investigative team at the Project On Government Oversight, a non-partisan government watchdog nonprofit. While there, he helped write a report entitled "Drug Problems: Dangerous Decision-Making at the FDA." The report and its associated work won the Society of Professional Journalists' 2015 Sigma Delta Chi Award for excellence in journalism for independent non-deadline journalism.

== Pulitzer Prize ==
Crewdson was the recipient of the 1981 Pulitzer Prize for National Reporting "For his coverage of illegal aliens and immigration" while writing for the New York Times, making him at that time the second-youngest Pulitzer recipient in the paper's history (after David Halberstam). Crewdson was a Pulitzer finalist in 1986 for his exhaustive reporting on the inadequacy of in-flight medical supplies aboard commercial airliners. His coverage prompted most major airlines to begin carrying portable defibrillators and emergency medical kits. In addition to the Pulitzer and the Polk awards, Crewdson's other journalistic prizes include the Sigma Delta Chi bronze medallion, the New York Deadline Club's Goldberg award, the New York Newspaper Guild's Page One Award, and the American Bar Association's Silver Gavel award. After 28 years at the Chicago Tribune, Crewdson joined the Washington-based investigative reporting team at Bloomberg News, where he produced exclusive stories on campaign finance which garnered the National Press Foundation’s Dirksen Award for coverage of congress, the National Press Club’s Lee Walczak Award for Political Analysis, and honorable mention for the Toner Prize for Excellence in Political Reporting. In 2015, Crewdson shared the Sigma Delta Chi award for non-deadline reporting for “Dangerous Decision-making at the FDA." He was also awarded second place in the Association of Health Care Journalists' annual award for excellence for his reporting on the FDA's flawed drug approval process. The Society of American Business Editors and Writers also honored Crewdson as a finalist for his “Exhaustive reconstruction of the FDA’s failures, misjudgments, and blind eye to conflicts of interest.”

== Books ==
John Crewdson has written three books.

- The Tarnished Door: The New Immigrants and the Transformation of America ISBN 978-0-8129-1042-1 (Times Books, 1983) Looks at the world of illegal aliens residing in the United States and explores topics including the chaos, inadequacy, and corruption of American immigration policy and service (New York Times Notable Book for 1983).
- By Silence Betrayed: Sexual Abuse of Children in America (Little Brown & Co: 1988) ISBN 978-0-316-16094-0 Interviews with experts and victims (New York Times Notable Book for 1988).
- Science Fictions: A Scientific Mystery, a Massive Cover-Up, and the Dark Legacy of Robert Gallo ISBN 978-0-316-13476-7 (Little Brown & Co. 2002). Reprint ISBN 978-0-316-09004-9 (Back Bay Books, 2003)
