= Michael Vitez =

American journalist and author

Michael Thomas Vitez
- Born: April 11, 1957 (age 69); Washington, D.C.
- Occupations: Director of Narrative Medicine, Lewis Katz School of Medicine, Temple University
- Spouse: Maureen Fitzgerald
- Children: 3 children
- Awards: 1997 Pulitzer prize, explanatory reporting

Michael Thomas Vitez (born April 11, 1957) is an American Pulitzer Prize-winning journalist and author. He is the son of immigrants, his father having fled from Budapest, Hungary in 1939, and his mother came to America from Europe as a German Jew in 1941; both leaving their homeland to escape from Hitler's reign. He is the director of narrative medicine at the Lewis Katz School of Medicine at Temple University, after serving as a journalist over a three decade career (1985–2015) with The Philadelphia Inquirer.

His work at the Inquirer was focused on human-interest stories. In 1997, Vitez, along with Inquirer photographers April Saul and Ron Cortes, was awarded the Pulitzer Prize in Explanatory Journalism for a series of articles he wrote on end-of-life care, telling the stories of terminally ill patients who wished to die with dignity. He has authored four books, one based on his Pulitzer Prize-winning stories, Final Choices.

== Biography ==
=== Background and education ===
Vitez was born on April 11, 1957, in Washington, DC and grew up in North Springfield, in northern Virginia. He is the son of immigrants, his father, Thomas Vitez, fled Budapest, Hungary in 1939, and his mother, Marianne, came to America from Europe as a German Jew in 1941; both leaving their homeland to escape from Hitler's reign. His parents met in New York City, eventually moving to the Washington area. Even though his parents both wrote their own biographies, he told their stories in his book, Great Americans. He is married to Maureen Fitzgerald, and they have three children.

=== Career ===
Vitez gained his first experience in journalism, as editor in chief of his school newspaper, The Cavalier Daily, at the University of Virginia, from 1978 to 1979. After graduating from the University of Virginia in 1979, Vitez found positions at a series of middle-sized newspapers; first as a staff member at the Virginian-Pilot/LedgeStarr (1979–80), and on the staff of The Washington Star (1980–1981). He was on the staff of the Hartford Courant before being offered and accepting a position at the Inquirer in 1985.

Vitez has had a long career in Philadelphia, as a general-assignment feature writer. After completing eight months as a Knight-Wallace Fellow at the University of Michigan in 1994–95, Vitez began to focus on aging, and end-of-life decisions. In 1997, Vitez, along with Inquirer photographers April Saul and Ron Cortes, was awarded the Pulitzer Prize in Explanatory Journalism for a series of articles he wrote on end-of-life care, telling the stories of terminally ill patients who wished to die with dignity.

As a result of his work leading up to his Pulitzer Prize win, Vitez wrote Final Choices, a book, based on his award-winning articles, focusing on individuals in pursuit of a noble death that was published in 1997. Vitez noted that he tries "to celebrate ordinary people around us by showing how ordinary people sometimes do extraordinary things."

In November 2006, Vitez published Rocky Stories, a collection of stories about people who came to Philadelphia to run the famous Rocky Steps at the Philadelphia Museum of Art. The book features glossy, color photos by Inquirer photographer and fellow Pulitzer Prize-winner Tom Gralish, and an introduction by the star of the Rocky movies, Sylvester Stallone.

"You can't borrow Superman's cape. You can't use the Jedi laser sword. But the steps are there. The steps are accessible. And standing up there, you kind of have a piece of the Rocky pie."

— from the Foreword by Sylvester Stallone

His focus on end-of-life care continued, and Vitez was granted access, for 18-months, to Abington Memorial Hospital, in Pennsylvania. in 2010, Vitez wrote a story about palliative care, "A look at the New Field of Palliative Care." His second article, "One 's Simple Measure to Defeat Infections," described how a simple hand-washing campaign, could save lives and prevent needless infections.

In 2015, Vitez left the Inquirer to serve as the director of narrative medicine at the Lewis Katz School of Medicine at Temple University. He also teaches elective courses at the university.

== Bibliography ==
- Final Coices: Seeking the Good Death, Camino Books, 1997.
- Rocky Stories: Tales of Love, Hope and Happiness at America's Most Famous Steps, Paul Dry Books, 2006.
- The Road Back: A Journey of Grace and Grit, CreateSpace Publishing Platform, 2012.
- Great Americans: Stories of Resilience and Joy in Everyday Life, CreateSpace Independent Publishing Platform, 2016.

== Awards and recognition ==
- 1997 Pulitzer Prize for Explanatory Journalism, with photographers April Saul and Ron Cortez, for his series on end-of-life care.
- 1997 Excellence in Media Award, by the American Association of Homes and Services for the Aging.
- 2008 Finalist for the Vigoda Award.
- 2010 Honorable Mention, Barlett & Steele Awards, for "Inside the Health-Care Crucible: Reports from a Hospital in a time of Upheaval."
- 2015 Best Journalism of 2015, by SI.com, for his story, "Emerging from a tragic, battered childhood, hope, in a college future."
