= Kevin Helliker =

American journalist

Kevin P. Helliker (born January 25, 1959) is an American journalist, formerly a senior writer and editor on the New York sports desk of The Wall Street Journal. After spending over 25-years with the Journal, he joined the Brunswick Group, in February 2017.

In 2004, Helliker and Thomas M. Burton shared the 2004 Pulitzer Prize for Explanatory Reporting, citing "their groundbreaking examination of aneurysms, an often overlooked medical condition that kills thousands of Americans each year." The articles demonstrably saved lives and changed medical protocol by showing that, contrary to conventional medical wisdom, aortic aneurysms are preventable, treatable and not so rare.

Helliker is a graduate of the Department of English at the University of Kansas.
