= Bettina Boxall =

American journalist

- Born: 1952 (age 73–74)
- Education: B.A., University of Maine
- Occupation: Journalist
- Years active: 1985–present
- Awards: Pulitzer Prize for Explanatory Reporting

Bettina Boxall (born 1952) is an American journalist who covered water issues and the environment for the Los Angeles Times. She is a recipient of a Pulitzer Prize for Explanatory Reporting. She graduated in 1974, with honors, from the University of Maine in Orono. Boxall retired from the Times on May 3, 2022, after 34 years at the paper.

Boxall, who is openly gay, has written about civil rights issues and joined in panel discussions about the role of LGBT journalists and writing about the issues that involve the LGBT community.

== Background and education ==
When she was growing up, Boxall did not have a deep desire to become a reporter, but in high school she became editor of The Maine Campus which was why she chose journalism as her major in university. At that point, she developed an interest in photojournalism.

She also enjoyed her geology class with Professor Stephen Norton. It was some of that early study that laid the groundwork for her Pulitzer Prize. She explained, "on both the exams and field trips, he demanded that his students think rather than regurgitate information. The facts were just the foundation for critical thinking. That was a valuable lesson to learn as a journalist."

Boxall graduated in 1974, summa cum laude, with a Bachelor's degree in journalism from the University of Maine.

== Career ==
Boxall began her journalistic career (1976–1977) as a staff photographer and writer at the San Marcos Daily Record – a small daily paper in Texas, and the Bennington Banner, (1978–1982) in Vermont and a small newspaper in New Jersey.

=== On environmental issues ===
Boxall began working at the Los Angeles Times in 1987 covering environmental and natural resources, focusing on fire and water issues. In 2009, Boxall and her colleague, Julie Cart, won the Pulitzer Prize for Explanatory Reporting (see Awards below). Her work dovetails with her personal efforts to conserve resources, and her views on the environmental issues she reports on. In one 2014 interview, she talked about the pride she has in conserving water saying:

"I'm very proud that I do not have a blade of grass in my property. I have decomposed granite and succulents in my front yard. I put in native California plants. My peak water consumption has gone down by half. During the winter, I'm really not irrigating at all. I have high-efficiency water appliances. There was one water bill last year during the winter when I wasn’t irrigating at all that was down to 25 gallons per day and I went, Yes!"

In a 2016 interview, she spoke about the issues in the community of Monterey, and how local government needs to step up to prevent wildfires, saying "This area has burned over and over again and maybe we shouldn't have [houses] there."

=== On civil rights and equality ===
In the 1990s, Boxall gained recognition for her work as she began covering gay rights and AIDS in California, at the time "gay marriage and other issues were bubbling to the surface, signaling profound social shifts."

In 2013, Boxall, who is openly gay, joined a panel of openly gay and lesbian journalists in a discussion of "Out in the Newsroom: A look at LGBT coverage and careers in journalism." In 2019, she participated in another panel discussion, hosted by the Los Angeles LGBT Center titled "Breaking News, Breaking Barriers," focusing on the coverage of, and representation of, LGBT people beginning in the 1960s.

In 2020, Boxall was among six journalists to sue the Los Angeles Times over pay disparities due to race and gender bias. The civil suit was settled after numerous staffers, both current and former employees, joined in a writing campaign; social media protested the disparate treatment as black journalists called out the Times using the hashtag #BlackatLAT.

== Awards ==
Boxall received the Pulitzer Prize for Explanatory Reporting in 2009 with her colleague Julie Cart. The prize was for their 15-month investigation, leading up to the series of "Big Burn" stories, exploring the cost and effectiveness of fighting wildfires in the western United States. During their investigation, they examined US Forest Service records obtained by using the Freedom of Information Act, and traveled to Australia, investigating the country's different firefighting activities.

The Pulitzer board noted that the series was a "fresh and painstaking exploration into the cost and effectiveness of attempts to combat the growing menace of wildfires." The series of stories are listed below.

- "Big Burn: Out of control?" Los Angeles Times, Bettina Boxall and Julie Cart, July 27, 2008.
- "Big Burn: Just for show?" Los Angeles Times, Bettina Boxall and Julie Cart, July 29, 2008.
- "A politician gets his way," Los Angeles Times, Julie Cart, July 29, 2008.
- "Big Burn: In harms way," Los Angeles Times, Bettina Boxall, July 31, 2008.
- "Big Burn: Small trees, large threat," Los Angeles Times, Bettina Boxall, July 31, 2008.
- "Big Burn: Beige plague," Los Angeles Times, Bettina Boxall, August 2, 2008.
- "Big Burn: On their own," Los Angeles Times, Julie Cart, August 3, 2008.

In 2009, Boxall was given Northern Arizona University's Robert R. Eunson Distinguished Lecturer Award.
