= Leon Dash =

American journalist

- Born: March 16, 1944 (age 82); New Bedford, Massachusetts, U.S.
- Education: Howard University
- Occupation: journalist
- Notable credit: Pulitzer Prize-winner

Leon Dash (born March 16, 1944, in New Bedford, Massachusetts) is a professor emeritus of journalism at the University of Illinois at Urbana-Champaign. A former reporter for the Washington Post, he is the author of Rosa Lee: A Mother and Her Family in Urban America, which grew out of the eight-part Washington Post series for which he won the Pulitzer Prize.

== Biography ==
=== Early life and education ===
Dash was born about 1944 and grew up in Harlem and the Bronx. He attended Howard University, studying history. In 1969-1970, he served as a Peace Corps high school teacher in Kenya.

=== Journalism career ===
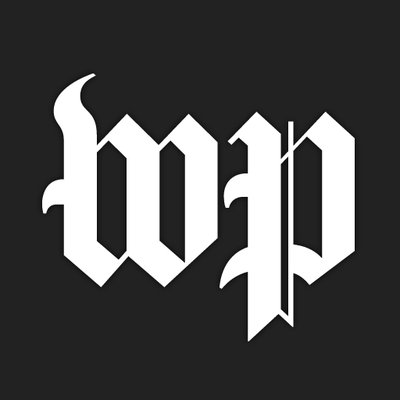
Washington Post logo

Dash joined the Washington Post in 1965 as a copy boy. He worked on the state department desk, on the city desk, and as the West Africa Bureau Chief.

In 1972, Dash was one of 7 black reporters dubbed the "Metro Seven" who filed a discrimination complaint against The Washington Post with the Equal Opportunity Employment Commission (EEOC) on March 23, 1972. It was he first action against a major metropolitan American newspaper.

Dash spent 10 weeks with rebel forces in Angola in 1973 and was named by the Overseas Press Club of America as the 1974 winner of the George Polk Memorial Award “for best reporting from abroad, in any medium, requiring exceptional courage and enterprise.”

External videos
- Booknotes interview with Dash on Rosa Lee: A Mother and Her Family in Urban America, November 10, 1996, C-SPAN

From 1988 and 1992, Dash embedded himself with the Cunningham family in Washington DC. The result was Rosa Lee, an eight-part series for the Washington Post published in September 1994, about one woman and her family's struggle to escape the urban underclass poverty in the city's projects. The eight-part series won a Pulitzer Prize for Explanatory Journalism in 1995. The series also and the Robert F. Kennedy Journalism Award. The series became the basis for Dash's 1996 book, Rosa Lee: A Mother and Her Family in Urban America. The series was later chosen as one of the best 100 pieces in 20th-century American Journalism by New York University's journalism department.

Dash lived in the inner city of Washington, D.C. for a year researching teenage pregnancy among black youths for a six-part series in the Post in 1986. The series later became a book, When Children Want Children: The Urban Crisis of Teenage Childbearing. The book challenges common beliefs that inadequate birth control and lack of sex education classes are the causes of teenage pregnancy. Instead, Dash's findings were "that some urban teens view motherhood as an achievement in a life devoid of other accomplishments and as an indication they had reached adulthood."

Leon retired in 2025.

=== Academic career ===
In 1998, Dash joined the University of Illinois as a professor of journalism, as well as Afro-American Studies. In 2000, he was named the Swanlund Chair, the highest endowed title bestowed upon faculty at the University of Illinois.

Three years later, he was made a permanent faculty member in the University's Center for Advanced Study. Dash served as director of the center from 2009 to 2014.

== Critical reception ==
Of his book Rosa Lee: A Mother and Her Family in Urban America, the Detroit Free Press called it a "stark, sobering chronicle of an impoverished, black Washington DC family" and said while "Dash's chronicle sometimes lacks the flow of a neatly tied tale, his sparse, clean writing is easy to read. Particularly touching are the scenes in which hope comes at the most unexpected times".

Of his book When Children Want Children: The Urban Crisis of Teenage Childbearing, the Baltimore Sun said "The problem of teenage pregnancy and unwed motherhood is so complex [...] that reading this book is almost suffocatingly depressing. [...] Dash takes us disconcertingly close to these families and lets them answer in their own voices. Unfortunately, Dash too often leaves the compelling stories of his adopted neighbours [...] to journey downtown to the shining, glamour world of the Post".

Of his series on teenage pregnancy, the Press of Atlantic City said "As in his other reports, Dash did not offer possible solutions to the problems he investigates. While it might infuriate some readers, [...] that's not Dash's style."

== Awards ==
- Overseas Press Club of America's George Polk Memorial Award 1974 “for best reporting from abroad, in any medium, requiring exceptional courage and enterprise” for his work in Angola.
- A Pulitzer Prize for Explanatory Journalism with Lucien Perkins for the 1994 eight-part Washington Post series, Rosa Lee
- Emmy Award from the National Academy of Television Arts and Sciences in 1996 for a documentary series in the public affairs category of complex issues.
- Inducted into the NABJ's Hall of Fame on August 9, 2019 with the other members of Washington Post's Metro Seven
