= Natalie Wolchover =

Science journalist

Natalie Ann Wolchover (born October 16, 1986) is a science journalist. She is a senior writer and editor for Quanta Magazine, and has been involved with Quanta's development since its inception in 2013. In 2022 she won a Pulitzer Prize for Explanatory Reporting.

== Early life ==
Wolchover was born in London, England and later moved to Blanco, Texas.

== Writing career ==
Wolchover began her career freelancing for Make magazine and Seed, then worked as an intern for Science Illustrated. She then became a staff writer for Life's Little Mysteries where she answered science questions, debunked paranormal claims and fake videos and wrote about new research.

Wolchover has written for publications including Quanta Magazine, Nature, The New Yorker, Popular Science, and LiveScience. Her articles are often syndicated to sites such as Wired, Business Insider, Nautilus, and The Atlantic.

Awards judges have recognized Wolchover's ability to communicate complex ideas such as Bayesian statistics to a general audience.

=== Selected writing ===
Wolchover writes on topics within the physical sciences, such as high-energy physics, particle physics, AdS/CFT, quantum computing, gravitational waves, astrophysics, climate change, and Gödel's incompleteness theorems. Notable interviews include the highly cited theorists in high energy physics Ed Witten, Lisa Randall, Eva Silverstein, Juan Maldecena, Joe Polchinski, and Nima Arkani-Hamed.

== Education ==
Wolchover obtained a bachelor's degree in physics from Tufts University, during which time she co-authored several publications in non-linear optics. In 2009, Wolchover went on to study graduate-level physics at the University of California, Berkeley. She left graduate school during the first year in order to pursue a career in science journalism.

== Awards and honors ==
- 2022 Pulitzer Prize for Explanatory Reporting
- 2017 Science Communication Award, American Institute of Physics.
- 2017 Director's Visitor, Institute for Advanced Study.
- 2016 Excellence in Statistical Reporting Award, American Statistical Association.
- 2016 Evert Clark / Seth Payne Award, Council for the Advancement of Science Writing.
- Writing featured in The Best Writing on Mathematics 2015.

== Personal life ==
Wolchover lives in Brooklyn, New York with her wife.
