= Quanta Magazine =

Nonprofit online science magazine

- Editor: Samir Patel
- Categories: Physics, mathematics, biology, computer science
- Publisher: Simons Foundation
- First issue: 2012
- Country: United States
- Website: www.quantamagazine.org
- ISSN: 2640-2661
- OCLC: 914339324

Quanta Magazine is an editorially independent online publication of the Simons Foundation covering developments in physics, mathematics, biology and computer science.

== History ==
Quanta Magazine was initially launched as Simons Science News in October 2012, but it was renamed to its current title in July 2013.

It was founded by the former New York Times journalist Thomas Lin, who was the magazine's editor-in-chief until 2024. The deputy editor is Michael Moyer, formerly of Scientific American, and the art director is Samuel Velasco. In 2024, Samir Patel became the magazine's second editor in chief.

== Content ==
The articles in the magazine are freely available to read online. Scientific American, Wired, The Atlantic, and The Washington Post, as well as international science publications like Spektrum der Wissenschaft, have reprinted articles from the magazine. Articles from the magazine have been translated into German, Spanish, French, Chinese, Italian and Japanese.

In November 2018, MIT Press published two collections of articles from Quanta Magazine, Alice and Bob Meet the Wall of Fire and The Prime Number Conspiracy.

The magazine's YouTube channel has more than one million subscribers and publishes award-winning animated explainer videos and short documentaries.

The magazine also has three podcasts, two of which are hosted by Steven Strogatz. Janna Levin joined as cohost of The Joy of Why for the third season in 2024.

== Reception ==
Undark Magazine described Quanta Magazine as "highly regarded for its masterful coverage of complex topics in science and math." The science news aggregator RealClearScience ranked Quanta Magazine first on its list of "The Top 10 Websites for Science in 2018."

In 2020, the magazine received a National Magazine Award for General Excellence from the American Society of Magazine Editors for its "willingness to tackle some of the toughest and most difficult topics in science and math in a language that is accessible to the lay reader without condescension or oversimplification."

In May 2022, the magazine's staff, notably Natalie Wolchover, were awarded the Pulitzer Prize for Explanatory Reporting for an article Wolchover wrote about the James Webb Space Telescope and an accompanying short documentary by Emily Buder.
