= Julie Cart =

American journalist

- Born: Louisiana
- Education: B.S., Arizona State University
- Occupation: Journalist
- Employer: CalMatters
- Awards: 2009 Pulitzer Prize

Julie Cart, born in Louisiana, is an American journalist. She won the 2009 Pulitzer Prize for Explanatory Reporting, with her colleague, Bettina Boxall, for their series of stories looking at the cost and effectiveness of combating wildfires in the western United States. She has worked for the Los Angeles Times and several other news organizations. She currently covers environmental issues in the California state capitol as a writer with CalMatters

While attending Arizona State University, she was a track and field athlete. She held the ninth all-time record in the discus throw in 1980, and won the women's championship at the 1976 Intermountain Conference Championships; she also made the U.S. Olympic trials.

== Education and background ==
Cart began showing an interest in writing during her high school years when she was editor of the school newspaper. At the same time, she was writing news briefs as an unpaid student for her local paper.

Cart graduated from Arizona State University, with a B.S., in Journalism, in 1980. She attended on an athletic scholarship and was one of the first women's conference champion's in Arizona State's track and field history, winning the 1976 Intermountain Conference Championships for the discus throw. Cart held the university's 9th all-time discus throw record in 1980, at 52.04 meters. Cart was inducted into the Cronkite School Alumni Hall of Fame in 1988.

She is married to an Australian journalist, whom she met in Melbourne at the Australian Open.

== Career ==
Following her time in high school as a mainly unpaid reporter, Cart took on the role of "copy kid" at The Arizona Republic, and thereafter joined United Press International (UPI) in Phoenix, Arizona as a reporter.

In 1983, she became a reporter for the Metro Section at the Los Angeles Times, later becoming national correspondent. As an award-winning sportswriter, she covered the 1990 FIFA World Cup in Italy, Winter Olympic Games, Summer Olympic Games, Wimbledon, boxing in China, soccer in Argentina and apartheid athletes in South Africa.

Eventually, she left the sports department to become the bureau chief with the Times National staff in Denver, Colorado. In 2003, Cart joined the environmental staff, reporting on public lands and endangered species.

Throughout her career at the LA Times, Cart has focused on investigations and special projects. Cart has covered multiple topics in her LA Times reporting including Utah polygamy, the Columbine High School massacre, post-911 and the recovery of Hurricane Katrina.

In 2009, Cart and fellow journalist Bettina Boxall were awarded the Pulitzer Prize for Explanatory Reporting. The prize was for their 15-month investigation, leading up to the series of "Big Burn" stories, exploring the cost and effectiveness of fighting wildfires in the western United States. The series of stories are listed below.

- "Big Burn: Out of control?" Los Angeles Times, Bettina Boxall and Julie Cart, July 27, 2008.
- "Big Burn: Just for show?" Los Angeles Times, Bettina Boxall and Julie Cart, July 29, 2008.
- "A politician gets his way," Los Angeles Times, Julie Cart, July 29, 2008.
- "Big Burn: In harms way," Los Angeles Times, Bettina Boxall, July 31, 2008.
- "Big Burn: Small trees, large threat," Los Angeles Times, Bettina Boxall, July 31, 2008.
- "Big Burn:Beige plague," Los Angeles Times, Bettina Boxall, August 2, 2008.
- "Big Burn: On their own," Los Angeles Times, Julie Cart, August 3, 2008.

In 2015 Cart joined CALmatters, a journalism organization covering California's state capitol. She covers the environment beat.

== Awards ==
- 1983 Third place for Investigative Reporting, from the Associated Press Sports Editors award
- 1984 First place for Best Sports Story and Best News Story from the UPI-California Nevada Association
- 1987 The Greater Los Angeles Press Club awarded her first place for the Best Sports Story
- 1990 Honorable mention for Enterprise Reporting and two years later fifth place for Enterprise Reporting
- 1993 The Women's Sports Foundation Award
- 1995 Second place for Enterprise Reporting
- 2005 Second place, the Kevin Carmody Award for Outstanding Investigative Reporting awarded by the Society of Environmental Journalists
- 2006 Honorable mention from the Columbia Graduate School of Journalism in the John B. Oakes Award for Distinguished Environmental Journalism
- 2009 The Pulitzer Prize for explanatory reporting with colleague Bettina Boxall, Los Angeles Times
- 2010 The Mary Garber Pioneer Award from the Association for Women in Sports Media, and third place for Outstanding Explanatory Reporting for "Writing on the Wall," from the Society of Environmental Journalists.
- 2018 Recipient of the SEAL Environmental Journalism Award in recognition of her environmental coverage
