= Susie Neilson =

American investigative and data journalist

- Education: Northwestern University; UC Berkeley Graduate School of Journalism
- Occupations: Investigative and data journalist
- Employer: San Francisco Chronicle
- Known for: Fast and Fatal; Burned
- Awards: Pulitzer Prize for Explanatory Reporting (2026)

Susie Neilson is an American investigative and data journalist for the San Francisco Chronicle. Her reporting has focused on criminal justice, housing, public health, policing and the insurance industry.

Neilson, Megan Fan Munce and Sara DiNatale won the 2026 Pulitzer Prize for Explanatory Reporting for Burned, a series investigating how insurance-industry practices and algorithmic valuation tools left California wildfire survivors unable to rebuild their homes. Neilson and Jennifer Gollan had previously been finalists for the 2025 Pulitzer Prize for National Reporting for Fast and Fatal, an investigation of deaths caused by police vehicle pursuits in the United States.

== Education ==
Neilson studied journalism at Northwestern University's Medill School of Journalism, graduating with a Bachelor of Science in journalism in 2015.

As an undergraduate, she received recognition in the Hearst Journalism Awards Program's feature-writing competition. After graduating, she received support from the Creative Visions Foundation for Yellowbone, a documentary project about skin-lightening products and colorism in South Africa.

Neilson later attended the UC Berkeley Graduate School of Journalism, where she studied investigative, multimedia, science and data reporting. She graduated in 2019. She contributed to Unseen: Working in the Shadow of the Golden State, a multimedia project about workers in California's informal economy, producing a report titled On the Line.

== Career ==
Before joining the San Francisco Chronicle, Neilson worked in print, radio and investigative journalism. She reported for NPR, KQED, Business Insider, Reveal from the Center for Investigative Reporting and the Investigative Reporting Program at UC Berkeley. She also worked for Nautilus magazine and as a private investigator for the Mintz Group.

At KQED, she covered the COVID-19 pandemic and criminal justice. She subsequently became a science fellow at Business Insider, reporting on science, medicine, space policy and public health.

Neilson joined the San Francisco Chronicle in 2021 as a member of its newly established data team. The team was created to use statistical analysis, public records and computational methods in the newspaper's reporting. Her reporting for the team included investigations and data projects concerning housing, public health, crime, policing and the treatment of incarcerated people.

In 2024, Neilson moved from the data team to the newspaper's investigative reporting team.

== Investigative reporting ==
=== Jail health care ===
In 2023, Neilson investigated Wellpath, a private company contracted to provide medical services in California jails. Her reporting examined allegations of inadequate treatment, staffing problems, lawsuits involving preventable deaths and limited state oversight of private jail health-care providers.

The investigation was later cited by members of the United States Senate seeking information from Wellpath and its private-equity owner about medical care and deaths in correctional facilities.

=== Voice-stress analysis investigation ===
Neilson and fellow Chronicle reporter Matthias Gafni investigated California law-enforcement agencies' use of the Computer Voice Stress Analyzer, a technology marketed as a method of detecting deception through vocal patterns. Their reporting documented the lack of scientific evidence supporting the device's accuracy and examined cases in which results from the technology had been used when evaluating complaints made by incarcerated people.

Following the investigation, the California Department of Corrections and Rehabilitation announced that it was developing regulations to prohibit the technology's use in state prisons and parole offices.

=== Fast and Fatal ===
Neilson and investigative reporter Jennifer Gollan spent approximately a year producing Fast and Fatal, a seven-part investigation into deaths and injuries caused by police vehicle pursuits. The reporters assembled five databases using federal records, local police data, news reports, court documents and public-records requests.

The investigation found that police pursuits caused more than 3,300 deaths in the United States between 2017 and 2022. Those killed included passengers, pedestrians, other motorists and police officers, as well as the drivers being pursued. Neilson and Gollan also found hundreds of deaths that were absent from data maintained by the National Highway Traffic Safety Administration.

The series reported that many fatal chases began over traffic violations or other low-level suspected offenses. It also examined the use of intentional vehicle-ramming manoeuvres and the limited disciplinary or legal consequences faced by officers who initiated pursuits that resulted in deaths.

After receiving the Chronicle's data, the National Highway Traffic Safety Administration revised parts of its records. The investigation also contributed to proposals for standardized national pursuit policies and improved collection of information about pursuit-related deaths and injuries.

Fast and Fatal received a 2024 Investigative Reporters and Editors Award in the print and online category. It won the 2025 Hillman Prize for Newspaper Journalism, was a finalist for the Goldsmith Prize for Investigative Reporting and made Neilson and Gollan finalists for the 2025 Pulitzer Prize for National Reporting.

=== Burned ===
In 2025, Neilson and climate reporter Megan Fan Munce began reporting on the difficulties faced by California wildfire survivors whose insurance payments were insufficient to rebuild their homes. Their investigation examined software and algorithmic tools used by insurance companies to estimate replacement costs and establish policy limits.

The reporters examined 360Value, a property-estimation system used by several major insurers. They reported that the system relied on outdated or incomplete information and could underestimate rebuilding costs by hundreds of thousands of dollars. The investigation drew on court and regulatory records, interviews with insurance and construction professionals, and direct testing of the software.

The initial investigation won the 2025 Barlett & Steele Gold Award in the regional and local category for investigative business journalism.

Neilson, Munce and Sara DiNatale later expanded the reporting into the series Burned. The series examined underinsurance, the handling and denial of claims, disputes over smoke damage and other obstacles faced by Californians attempting to rebuild after wildfires.

In 2026, Neilson, Munce and DiNatale received the Pulitzer Prize for Explanatory Reporting for the series. The Pulitzer citation credited the reporters with demonstrating how insurers' use of algorithmic tools and other practices systematically undervalued damaged homes and prevented some fire survivors from rebuilding.

== Awards and recognition ==
In 2024, Neilson and Jennifer Gollan received an Investigative Reporters and Editors Award for Fast and Fatal.

In 2025, Fast and Fatal received the Hillman Prize for Newspaper Journalism and was a finalist for the Goldsmith Prize for Investigative Reporting. Neilson and Gollan were also finalists for the Pulitzer Prize for National Reporting for the investigation.

Also in 2025, Neilson and Megan Fan Munce received the Barlett & Steele Gold Award in the regional and local category for their investigation of the insurance-estimation systems that contributed to the underinsurance of California homeowners.

In 2026, Neilson, Munce and Sara DiNatale won the Pulitzer Prize for Explanatory Reporting for Burned.
