= Kathleen Gallagher =

American journalist

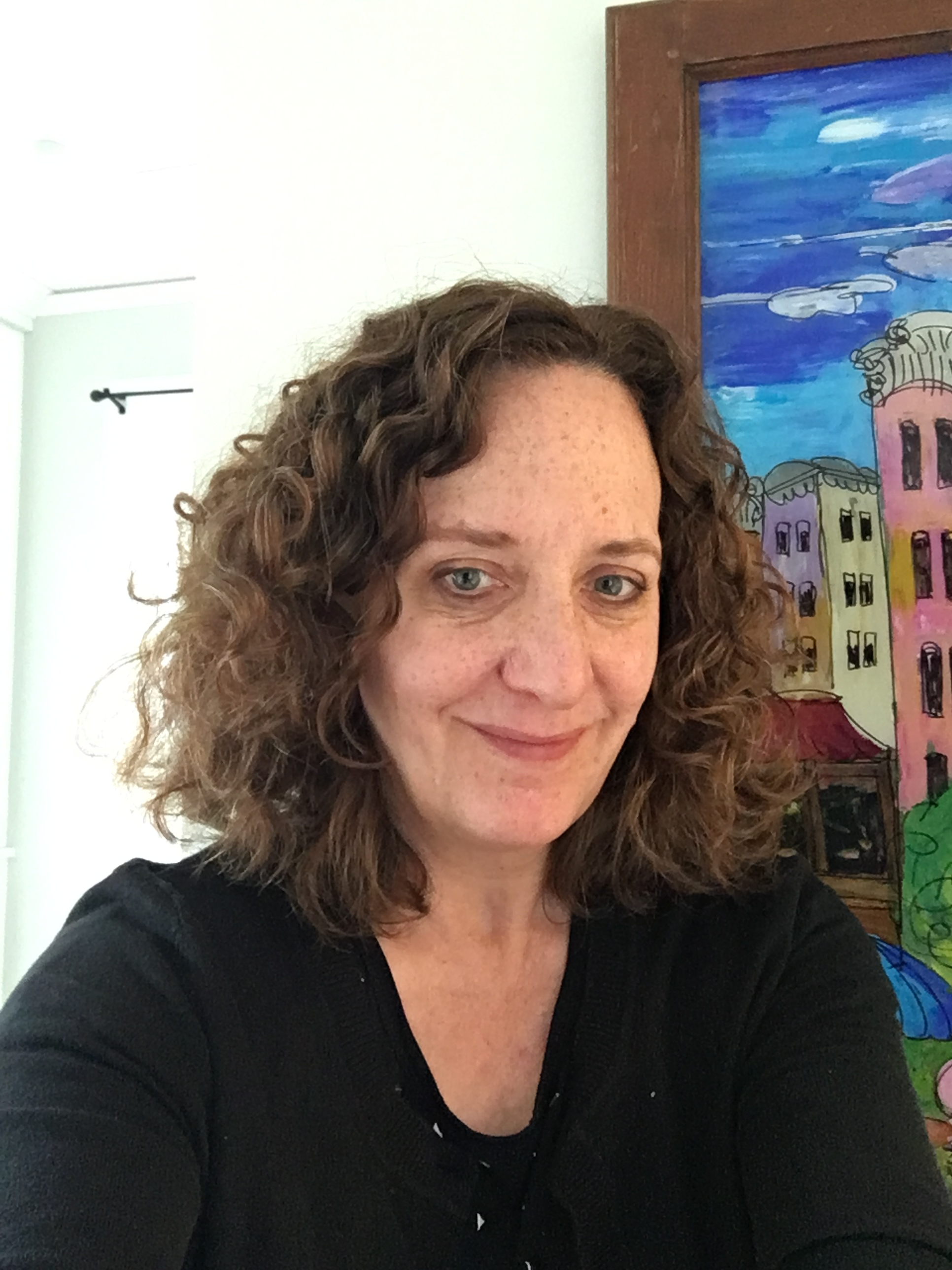
- Occupation: Journalist
- Notable awards: Science Journalism Award - Large Newspapers, Pulitzer Prize for Explanatory Reporting

Kathleen Gallagher is a Wisconsin-based non-profit executive who was awarded the 2011 Pulitzer Prize for Explanatory Reporting. Gallagher wrote with Mark Johnson, a reporter at the Milwaukee Journal Sentinel, a book based on the Pulitzer Prize-winning series called "One in a Billion: The Story of Nic Volker and the Dawn of Genomic Medicine." Gallagher is now Executive Director of 5 Lakes Institute, a non-profit that promotes technology and innovation. She is also Executive in Residence for Investment Communications at the University of Wisconsin-Milwaukee.

== Education ==
Gallagher earned her Bachelor's in Journalism from the University of Wisconsin-Madison and her MA in English from the University of Illinois.

== Professional history ==
From 1990 to 1993, Gallagher held the role of Communications Consultant at the Federal Reserve Bank of Chicago and was also a Writing Instructor at the American Institute of Banking in Chicago. Following that, she began working as a business reporter for the Milwaukee Journal Sentinel. She left the Journal Sentinel in 2017 to become Executive Director of 5 Lakes Institute (previously called the Milwaukee Institute).

== Journalism ==
While Gallagher worked at the Milwaukee Journal Sentinel, she undertook several investigations. They included: the investigation of a multistate cattle Ponzi scheme operator, travelling by helicopter with professional investors to visit oil rigs in the Gulf of Mexico, and reporting on a firm selling stem cell-derived heart cells to pharmaceutical companies. She covered investments, life sciences and other emerging, high-growth industries in the Wisconsin area.

In 2011, Gallagher won the Pulitzer Prize for Explanatory Reporting with Mark Johnson, Gary Porter, Lou Saldivar, and Alison Sherwood for their “lucid examination of an epic effort to use genetic technology to save a 4-year-old boy imperiled by a mysterious disease, told with words, graphics, videos and other images.” The title was: ‘One in a Billion: A Boy’s Life, a Medical Mystery.’
