= The Baltimore Examiner =

Defunct daily newspaper in Baltimore, Maryland, US

- Type: Daily newspaper
- Format: Tabloid
- Owner: Clarity Media Group
- Publisher: Michael Beatty
- Editor: Frank Keegan
- Founded: 2006
- Ceased publication: 2009
- Headquarters: 400 E. Pratt Street; Baltimore, Maryland 21202; United States
- Circulation: 236,000 daily (as of 2007)
- Website: thebaltimoreexaminer.com

The Baltimore Examiner was a free daily newspaper in Baltimore, Maryland. It launched in 2006 and ceased publication in 2009.

== History ==
The Baltimore Examiner was launched as a new daily newspaper in the city in 2006 by the Philip Anschutz-owned Clarity Media Group as part of a new national newspaper chain of several publications in numerous cities named "Examiner", that at the time began with and included the old The San Francisco Examiner (founded 1863 and owned since 1880 by founder William Randolph Hearst (1863–1951), and his successors, the Hearst Communications longtime media syndicate until sold in 2000). It also included Anschutz and his San Francisco-based staff and its new expansion start-up of The Washington Examiner and later additional daily paper 40 miles northeast to Baltimore. Unlike The Baltimore Sun or The Washington Post, the new Examiners for Baltimore and Washington were free newspapers funded solely by advertisement support.

After an unsuccessful effort to find a buyer, the paper folded three years into its publication.

Three years after it shattered, the former managing editor of The Baltimore Examiner, Len Lazarick announced along with several others from various national newspapers, about then starting what was originally called The Baltimore Post-Examiner three years later in April 2012, according to a press release.

The Examiner's prominent logo sign adorned the Downtown Baltimore skyline on the top south facade of its former editorial headquarters skyscraper building at 400 East Pratt Street, facing the famed Inner Harbor waterfront until 2013, when it was replaced with that signage of technology marketing firm R2integrated. The naming rights for the skyscraper office building were later acquired in 2022 by the law firm Silverman, Thompson, Slutkin & White.

== Conservative tone ==
Editorially, The Examiner was often viewed as taking a more conservative tone than The Baltimore Sun.
