= Ronald Kotulak =

American journalist

Ronald Kotulak (born 1935) is an American author and Pulitzer Prize-winning journalist.

== Education and career ==
Kotulak attended Wayne State University from 1953 to 1954. He earned a bachelor's degree from the University of Michigan in 1959.

He began working at the Chicago Tribune in 1959 and became science editor for the newspaper in 1965. After graduating from the University of Michigan, he joined the staff as a school board reporter from 1961 to 1963. He was also president of the National Association of Science Writers from 1972 to 1973. His book, Inside the Brain: Revolutionary Discoveries of How the Mind Works, was published in 1996.

== Awards and accolades ==
Kotulak won the Pulitzer Prize for Explanatory Journalism in 1994 for his "lucid coverage of current developments in neurological science." His winning articles, Research Unraveling Mysteries of the Brain and Lost Lives and the Roots of Violence both explore environmental effects on early brain development.

He received honorable mention at the Science Journalism Awards in 1964 for his article Plasma Physics.
