= Of Reminiscences and Reflections =

Orchestral work by Gunther Schuller

- by Gunther Schuller
- Commissioned by: Louisville Orchestra
- Published: 1993: Associated Music Publishers

Of Reminiscences and Reflections is an orchestral composition by the American composer Gunther Schuller. It was composed on a commission from the Louisville Orchestra as an elegy to Schuller's wife Marjorie, who died in November 1992. The composition was written over a 17-day period in September 1993 and has a duration of roughly 20 minutes. The piece was awarded the 1994 Pulitzer Prize for Music.
