= Jake Bernstein (market analyst) =

American businessman

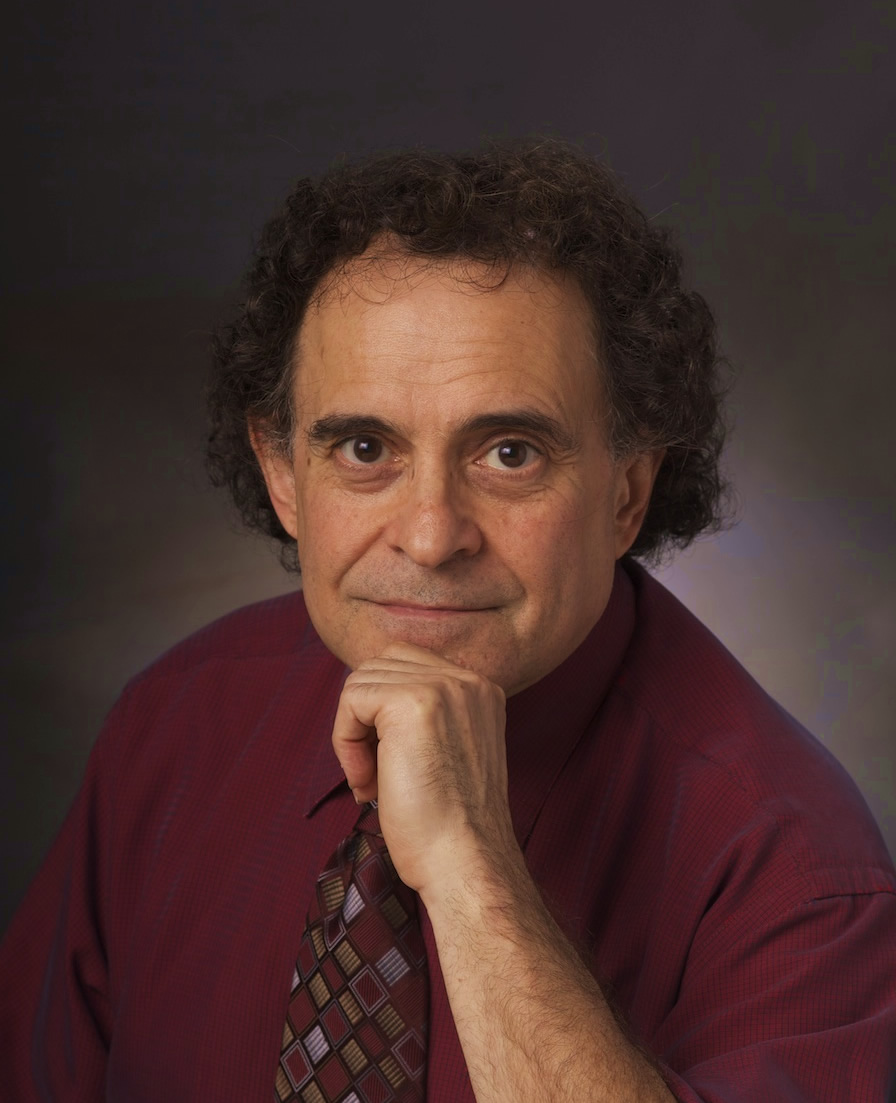

President & CEO Network Press Inc. and MBH Commodity Advisors Inc.

Personal details
- Born: 20 September 1946 (age 79) Garmisch-Partenkirchen, Bavaria, Germany
- Education: University of Illinois; Roosevelt University
- Profession: Market Analyst

Jake Bernstein is President of Network Press, Inc. in Santa Cruz, California. Bernstein claims expertise in seasonal trading and has developed methods of trading in futures markets, and has been a featured speaker at many investment conferences and trading seminars. In 1999, Bernstein was fined by the National Futures Association $200,000 and permanently barred from NFA membership for not using proper disclaimers in his materials rendering the ruling "using misleading and deceptive Promotional Material".

== Early life and education ==
Bernstein graduated from University of Illinois in 1966 with a bachelor of arts degree in Clinical and Experimental Psychology.

== Publisher and author ==
Bernstein is publisher of the "Jake Bernstein Weekly Futures Trading Letter," "Bernstein on Stocks," "The Letter of Long-Term Trends, and "COT Analysis". Jake Bernstein has written more than 42 books and research studies on futures trading, stock trading, trader psychology and economic forecasting. Articles by Bernstein have appeared in Futures Magazine, Money Maker, Stocks and Commodities, Barron’s Financial Weekly, Stocks, Futures and Options Magazine, and FarmFutures.

== Bibliography ==
Bernstein has authored a large number of book, including:

• The Ultimate Day Trader (Adams Media Corp)
• Beyond the Investor’s Quotient (Wiley and Sons)
• Strategic Futures Trading (Dearborn Publishing)
• The New Prosperity (New York Inst. of Finance)
• Why Traders Lose How Traders Win (Probus)
• Facts on Futures (Probus/MBH)
• How to Trade the International Futures Markets (New York Inst of Finance)
• The Compleat Guide to Day Trading Stocks (McGraw-Hill)
• Stock Market Strategies that Work (with Elliott Bernstein) - McGraw-Hill
• How to Trade the Single Stock Futures Market (Sep 2002) - Dearborn
• No Bull Investing (Mar 2003) - Dearborn

Bernstein has also authored a series of webinars.
