= April Saul =

American journalist

April Saul is an American journalist. She specializes in documentary photojournalism.

Saul has photographed and written for The Philadelphia Inquirer since 1981. In 1997, Saul, along with Inquirer reporter Michael Vitez and photographer Ron Cortes, was awarded the Pulitzer Prize in Explanatory Journalism for a series of articles on end-of-life care, telling the stories of terminally-ill patients who wished to die with dignity.

== Biography ==
Saul was born on May 27, 1955, in Brooklyn, New York and grew up in East Brunswick Township, New Jersey. She received her BA in English from Tufts University and her MA in Mass Communication from the University of Minnesota. Saul is the daughter of journalist Louise Saul (1921-2015).

Saul became a photographer at The Baltimore Sun in 1980, and the following year, joined the staff of The Philadelphia Inquirer. She was the first recipient of the Nikon/ NPPA Documentary Sabbatical Grant for her work on Hmong refugees in 1985.

Over the last twenty-five years, she has won numerous honors, including the Robert F. Kennedy Journalism Award, the World Press Photo Budapest Award for Humanistic Photography and on various occasions, been named Photographer of the Year by the Northern Short Course, the Pennsylvania Press Photographers Association and the New Jersey Press Photographers Association.

In January 2006, Saul "vowed to document in words and photos the death of every child by gun in the eight-county Philadelphia region in 2006." The resulting column in the Philadelphia Inquirer was called "Kids, Guns and a Deadly Toll."
