= Karen Blessen =

American graphic artist

Karen Blessen (born 1951) is an American graphic artist. She won the Pulitzer Prize for Explanatory Reporting in 1989 for work together with David Hanners and William Snyder on a special section called "Anatomy of an Air Crash." She was the first graphic artist to win a Pulitzer Prize.

== Background ==
Karen Blessen was born in 1951. She lives in Dallas, TX. She has also lived in Lincoln, NE and Columbus, NE. She has been married to Kelly G. Nash since February 6, 2003.

== Education ==
After graduating Columbus High School, Blessen graduated with a BFA from the University of Nebraska–Lincoln.

== Honors and achievements ==
In 1989, was a graphic artist at The Dallas Morning News. Beginning a decade later she started adding writing to her art work at the journal. This included 'One Bullet,' which was both a story and art package following the emotional aftermath of a murder that took place outside of her home in 2003. For this she was given an Honorable Mention in the Texas Associated Press Managing Editor's competition.

In 1994 she received the distinct honor by New York City's Times Square Business Improvement District to create a signature look for the New Times Square.

In 1999-2000 New Year's Eve, Blessen headed a crew team of 'Times Square Confetti and Airborne Materials Engineers,' dropping three tons of confetti onto the crowd of celebrants below. Again she both wrote and illustrated a story detailing the experience, entitled 'Diary of a Confetti Engineer,' which appeared on January 16, 2000 in The Dallas Morning News. She won a Katie Award at the Advocate for a cover she did in October 2007 illustrating the Trinity Tollroad story.

Blessen set up 29 Pieces which is an art organization that mounted the largest public art project in Dallas' history as a tribute to President John F. Kennedy. She also co-founded Today Marks the Beginning – a not-for-profit organization that uses art to generate awareness of social issues.

In 2010, Blessen was selected by the Dallas Observer as one of three MasterMinds of the Arts in Dallas, as part of the publication's first MasterMinds competition. In 2015, she was on the panel of judges for the District 30 Congressional Art Competition held at the Janette Kennedy Gallery.

== Publications ==
Blessen illustrated Peace One Day, published by G. P. Putnam's Sons Books for Young Readers in 2005, which is a book for children about the creation of World Peace Day, in reference to 9/11. She also was the graphic artist for the book Be An Angel, published by Simon and Schuster in 1994.

== Humanitarian effort ==
Blessen went to Africa to work with Save the Children. In 2002, she went to Malawi, Mozambique and South Africa, interviewing women dealing with HIV/AIDS, producing 'Faces of a Plague' – a story and illustration of what she discovered – that was published in The Dallas Morning News and thereafter adapted for the Today Marks the Beginning theatrical production that raised more than $40,000 to "adopt" two villages in Malawi.

Blessen represented Texas in Absolut Statehood – a series of artworks commissioned by Absolut Vodka, benefiting the Design Industries Foundation for AIDS.
