= Water scarcity in the United States =

Water scarcity in the United States is an increasing issue. It's estimated that 2.2 million people in the U.S. do not have running water, and over 44 million people are using water systems that do not meet standards for water quality.

Water scarcity is the condition where the demand for fresh water exceeds the supply of fresh water resources. A country or region is considered to have water scarcity when the availability of natural hygienic water falls below 1000 meters cubed per person per year. Water scarcity is an issue that affects a large population within a certain region and a large timescale. Water scarcity affects many different aspects in Americans' daily lives, including the economy, health, electricity, hydraulic power plants, agriculture, and drinking water. This issue has been present for decades, but is becoming more prevalent due to climate change, pollution, and an increased demand for water through urbanization and agricultural practices.

== Causes of water scarcity ==
=== Pollution ===
Pollution is one of the main contributing factors to the increase in water scarcity in the U.S.. Water pollution is defined as the contamination of bodies of water and affects the availability of safe, clean drinking water for humans. Water pollution also causes harm to aquatic animals both in fresh and saltwater. There are two different types of water pollutants: point source and non-point source pollutants. A point source pollutant reaches a body of water from a single source, such as a discharge pipe or a leaking underground tank. A non-point source pollutant travels to the water indirectly, like runoff and sediment. Urbanization and population growth are two of the main factors that increase water pollution due to the increase in contaminated storm runoff, improper sewage treatment, and combined sewer overflow.

=== Climate change ===
Climate change is one of the other main factors that is increasing water scarcity in the U.S.. Climate change has caused the patterns of the hydraulic cycle一such as precipitation, runoff, and evaporation一to shift, leading to changes in the availability of water in certain areas. When the patterns of the hydraulic cycle change, this can cause the water supply to decrease. The U.S. is also experiencing an increase in urbanization, causing rivers such as the Colorado and the Rio Grande to be extremely exploited. This leads to a decrease in river flow to the ocean. Regions that are dependent on water availability are more likely to see an increase in water scarcity due to climate change, such as the West Coast. Uncertainties in the patterns of the hydraulic cycle are causing concern for those who plan around water flow, leading to skepticism in future water storage, like reservoirs and aquifers. Reservoirs have been impacted by climate change, demonstrating low levels of water storage, which is causing concern for the continued decline of water availability. Two particular reservoirs that are affected are Lake Mead in Nevada and Arizona and Lake Powell in Utah and Arizona. These two reservoirs are reaching deadpool status, which means they are at risk of being unable to flow downhill and power hydroelectric power stations. These two reservoirs are some of the largest in America, constructed in the early to mid-1900s, and provide power to a majority of the states along the West Coast, like Nevada, Arizona, California, Wyoming, Colorado, and New Mexico.

== Impact ==
Water scarcity impacts different aspects of America's society, economy, and environment, affecting sectors such as public health, agriculture, industry, and biodiversity.

=== Agriculture ===
Water scarcity impacts agricultural productivity, creating challenges for farmers and food production. The largest use of water for agriculture is irrigation, which is affected by an increase in salinity. Farming with water that has high salinity levels causes a reduction in crop yields and can increase water scarcity in certain areas. This can also cause reduced yields of water-intensive crops such as rice, soybeans, wheat, sugarcane, and cotton. Reduced agricultural output can lead to food insecurity and higher food prices due to a dependence on food imports.

=== Economic ===
Water scarcity plays a significant role in the economy. The quality and supply of water affects certain economic systems such as energy, transportation, and manufacturing. An increase in water scarcity can cause a decrease in the production of goods in those sectors, leading to the change in consumption for certain goods. Another factor that can impact the economy is the uncertainty that water scarcity can cause. With the increase in climate change, the hydraulic cycle is more unpredictable, which affects the amount of water that is available at any given time. This can cause uncertainty among economic decision makers, which can impact economic decisions that are made and their outcome.

=== Societal ===
Water scarcity can impact the health and wellbeing of civilians in areas that lack clean water. It is estimated that 2.2 million Americans do not have access to clean water in their homes. This can lead to minor health issues, such as headaches and digestion issues, but can also cause long-term health issues, such as kidney failure and cancer. Water insecurity has been demonstrated to disproportionately affect Latino, Black, and Indigenous communities, as well as immigrants, people in low-income housing, and people in rural areas. This issue can cause financial insecurities due to the cost of treating illnesses, the inability to work, and the cost to supply clean drinking water through alternate sources.

=== Biodiversity ===
Water scarcity poses a threat to ecosystems and biodiversity, primarily through its impact on aquatic habitats, rivers, wetlands, and lakes. Decreased water flows and water sources drying up disrupts the delicate balance of ecosystems, affecting a range of species, including fish, amphibians, and water-dependent plants. Animals can also experience habitat loss and fragmentation, affecting their reproduction and survival. The decline in biodiversity can also disrupt various ecosystem services such as water filtration, flood regulation, and nutrient cycling, leading to further ecological imbalances.

== Efforts ==
=== Desalination ===
Desalination is one method used to solve water scarcity around the world. Desalination is the process of filtering water that contains salt and other minerals so that it can be used for drinking water and other processes that require fresh water. The U.S. receives around 30% of their water from aquifers, which is too brackish when initially extracted, so desalination allows this water to be used for human consumption. There are two different types of desalination; thermal desalination and membrane-based desalination. Thermal desalination is a process that heats water so it evaporates and turns into water vapor, leaving behind minerals that were contaminating the water. The water vapor is then condensed, turning back into liquid form that is then available for human consumption. Membrane-based desalination is the process in which brackish water passes through a semipermeable material, filtering out any minerals from the water. The main issue surrounding desalination is the amount of energy required. The estimated energy consumption for the desalination of saltwater is over 25 times the amount required for freshwater. While new developments have been made to increase the energy efficiency of desalination technology, much of the desalination effort still use fossil fuels, which in turn contributes to an increase in water scarcity.

=== Water Pipelines ===
One of the main factors that impacts water scarcity is the lack of access to fresh water. Water pipelines are a set of pipes that allow for water that has been desalinated to be transported from the source to areas with low availability of fresh water. Aqueduct systems function in a similar way. In the American West, water scarcity is mainly caused by droughts, which are reducing the supply of freshwater available for human consumption. However, in the American Northwest, freshwater is more abundant. Water pipelines can be used to transport water from areas of abundance to areas with a lack of freshwater, reducing water scarcity in those areas. An example of this technique is how the Croton River in Upstate New York was diverted via the New Croton Dam during the 19th century. During the 20th century, more projects were undertaken to continue to divert water from areas of high availability and low need to New York City, where the availability of clean water in the area could not meet the demand. The Catskill Aqueduct System, which began construction in 1907, built over 160 miles of aqueducts. Following the completion of the Catskill Aqueduct System, city planners looked for other sources of water to supply the city in preparation for future increases in demand. The city planners identified the Delaware Aqueduct System, which built around 115 miles of aqueducts to transport water from the Delaware River to New York City.

=== Reducing & Reusing ===
With the increase in water usage, it is important to develop technologies and techniques to reduce and reuse the freshwater that is consumed. Constructed Wetlands (CWs) are a system that mimics the natural process of wetlands by incorporating vegetation, soils, and microbial flora to remove pollutants from the water. CWs have been effective in removing 90% of sediments and other organic materials from water, providing an effective method for filtering water. In February 2020, the Environmental Protection Agency released the National Water Reuse Action Plan (WRAP), which is promoting the development of reusing water to improve the sustainability of the freshwater consumed in the U.S..The WRAP aims to facilitate the sharing of knowledge between federal, state, local, and tribal governments to increase the reuse of freshwater from local communities to a national level. Technological headways in nanofiltration, oxidation-reduction, and reverse osmosis use filtering membranes in high pressurized systems to remove small contaminants, allowing for that water to be reused.

== State and regional management ==
=== Texas ===
According to the Texas Commission on Environmental Quality (TCEQ), at least 70 public water systems reported implementing water use restrictions in 2025. Texas has implemented measures to address the drought impacts to its water systems for several decades. In response to severe droughts across the state in the mid 1950s, Texas passed a constitutional amendment establishing the creation of the Texas Water Development Board (TWDB). The TWDB was initially authorized to issue $200 million in state bonds to local jurisdictions in the form of loans. Texas continued to address needs for water resources in terms of long-term planning and funding water projects including a $2 billion investment into the State Water Implementation Fund for Texas (SWIFT). In 2023, voters approved the creation of the Texas Water Fund and authorized a $1 billion one-time investment. Texas voters approved another state amendment pertaining to long-term funding of water projects in November 2025. More than 70% of the votes cast were in favor of Proposition 4 which requires the investment of up to $1 billion into the Texas Water Fund annually from collected state sales taxes that exceed $46.5 billion.
