= 1979 Pulitzer Prize =

Awards for journalism and related fields

The following are the Pulitzer Prizes for 1979.

== Journalism awards ==
- Public Service:
  - The Point Reyes Light, a California weekly. For its investigation of Synanon, (written by Dr. Richard Ofshe).
- Local General or Spot News Reporting:
  - The San Diego Evening Tribune, for its coverage of the collision of a Pacific Southwest air liner with a small plane over its city.
- Local Investigative Specialized Reporting:
  - Gilbert M. Gaul and Elliot G. Jaspin of the Pottsville Republican (Pennsylvania), for stories on the destruction of the Blue Coal Company by men with ties to organized crime.
- National Reporting:
  - James Risser of the Des Moines Register, for a series on farming damage to the environment.
- International Reporting:
  - Richard Ben Cramer of The Philadelphia Inquirer, for reports from the Middle East.
- Feature Writing:
  - Jon D. Franklin, science writer of The Baltimore Evening Sun, for an account of brain surgery.
- Commentary:
  - Russell Baker of The New York Times.
- Criticism:
  - Paul Gapp, architecture critic of the Chicago Tribune.
- Editorial Writing:
  - Edwin M. Yoder Jr. of the Washington Star.
- Editorial Cartooning:
  - Herbert Lawrence Block (Herblock) of The Washington Post, for the body of his work.
- Spot News Photography:
  - Thomas J. Kelly III of the Pottstown Mercury (Pennsylvania), for a series called Tragedy on Sanatoga Road.
- Feature Photography:
  - Staff Photographers of the Boston Herald American, for photographic coverage of the blizzard of 1978.

== Letters, Drama and Music Awards ==
- Fiction:
  - The Stories of John Cheever by John Cheever (Alfred A. Knopf)
- Drama:
  - Buried Child by Sam Shepard (Urizen)
- History:
  - The Dred Scott Case by Don E. Fehrenbacher (Oxford University Press)
- Biography or Autobiography:
  - Days of Sorrow and Pain: Leo Baeck and the Berlin Jews by Leonard Baker (Macmillan Publishers (United States))
- Poetry:
  - Now and Then by Robert Penn Warren (Random House)
- General Nonfiction:
  - On Human Nature by Edward O. Wilson (Harvard University Press)
- Music:
  - Aftertones of Infinity by Joseph Schwantner (C. F. Peters)
    first performed by the American Composers Orchestra on January 29, 1979, in Alice Tully Hall New York City.
