= 1997 Pulitzer Prize =

Awards for journalism and related fields

A listing of the Pulitzer Prize award winners for 1997:

== Journalism awards ==
| Public Service | The Times-Picayune (New Orleans) | " ... for its comprehensive series analyzing the conditions that threaten the world's supply of fish." |
| Beat Reporting | Byron Acohido of The Seattle Times | " ... for his coverage of the aerospace industry, notably an exhaustive investigation of rudder control problems on the Boeing 737, which contributed to new FAA requirements for major improvements." |
| Spot News Photography | Annie Wells of The Press Democrat (Santa Rosa, California) | " ... for her dramatic photograph of a local firefighter rescuing a teenager from raging floodwaters." |
| Breaking News Reporting | Staff of Newsday | " ... for its enterprising coverage of the crash of TWA Flight 800 and its aftermath." |
| Commentary | Eileen McNamara of The Boston Globe | " ... for her many-sided columns on Massachusetts people and issues." |
| Criticism | Tim Page of The Washington Post | " ... for his lucid and illuminating music criticism." |
| Editorial Cartooning | Walt Handelsman of The Times-Picayune (New Orleans) | |
| Editorial Writing | Michael Gartner of the Ames Tribune (Ames, Iowa) | " ... for his common sense editorials about issues deeply affecting the lives of people in his community." |
| Explanatory Journalism | Michael Vitez, reporter, and April Saul and Ron Cortes, photographers of The Philadelphia Inquirer | " ... for a series on the choices that confronted critically ill patients who sought to die with dignity." |
| Feature Photography | Alexander Zemlianichenko of the Associated Press | " ... for his photograph of Russian president Boris Yeltsin dancing at a rock concert during his campaign for re-election." (Moved by the Board from the Spot News Photography category) |
| Feature Writing | Lisa Pollak of The Baltimore Sun | " ... for her compelling portrait of a baseball umpire who endured the death of a son while knowing that another son suffers from the same deadly genetic disease." |
| International Reporting | John F. Burns of The New York Times | " ... for his courageous and insightful coverage of the harrowing regime imposed on Afghanistan by the Taliban." |
| Investigative Reporting | Eric Nalder, Deborah Nelson and Alex Tizon of The Seattle Times | " ... for their investigation of widespread corruption and inequities in the federally-sponsored housing program for Native Americans, which inspired much-needed reforms." |
| National Reporting | Staff of The Wall Street Journal | " ... for its coverage of the struggle against AIDS in all of its aspects, the human, the scientific and the business, in light of promising treatments for the disease." |

== Letters, Drama and Music Awards ==
- Biography or Autobiography:
  - Angela's Ashes: A Memoir by Frank McCourt (Scribner)
- Fiction:
  - Martin Dressler: The Tale of an American Dreamer by Steven Millhauser (Crown)
- History:
  - Original Meanings: Politics and Ideas in the Making of the Constitution by Jack N. Rakove (Alfred A. Knopf)
- General Nonfiction:
  - Ashes to Ashes: America's Hundred-Year Cigarette War, the Public Health, and the Unabashed Triumph of Philip Morris by Richard Kluger (Alfred A. Knopf)
- Poetry:
  - Alive Together: New and Selected Poems by Lisel Mueller (Louisiana State University Press)
- Drama:
  - No award given.
- Music;
  - Blood on the Fields by Wynton Marsalis (Boosey & Hawkes), premiered on January 28, 1997, at Woolsey Hall, Yale University, New Haven, Connecticut
