= An American Opera =

- Film poster
- Directed by: Tom McPhee
- Produced by: Tom McPhee
- Narrated by: Tom McPhee
- Edited by: Scott M. Lynch
- Animation by: Michael Frelick
- Distributed by: Man Smiling Moving Pictures
- Release date: January 2007 (Park City Film Music Festival)
- Running time: 77 minutes
- Country: United States
- Language: English

An American Opera is a 2007 documentary film by Tom McPhee chronicling the events following Hurricane Katrina in New Orleans, Louisiana, when pet owners were forced to evacuate without their pets. An American Opera follows the pets, vets, owners, officials, rescuers, and adopters of animals as they try to remedy the situation, revealing that not everyone had the same goal of saving animals. McPhee directed, narrated, and produced the film with the production companies Man Smiling Moving Pictures and Cave Studio.

== Synopsis ==
Interviewing leaders of animal organizations and volunteers who went to New Orleans after Hurricane Katrina, it is revealed that at the beginning, everyone had different ideas about how things should be done, but no one was willing to take charge because the problem was bigger than anyone could have imagined. The film champions the volunteers whose only concern was saving animals, unlike the animal organizations who were more concerned with the chain of command.

After about a month, the state put the Louisiana Society for the Prevention of Cruelty to Animals in charge who told the volunteers to stop rescuing. Anyone not with the LA/SPCA was considered ‘rogue’ and operating outside the authority. Meanwhile, the police in St. Bernard Parish were shooting dogs in what they say was a form of mercy.

Months after Katrina, many owners are still not reunited with their pets because they do not know where they are and do not have the means to find them. Some people have found that their animals have been adopted out and cannot get them back.

The film ends with Barkus, a Louisiana pet parade, indicating New Orleans was not washed away with the hurricane.

== History ==
McPhee and his girlfriend at the time left Bloomfield Hills, Michigan with two video cameras and still cameras and drove to the Lamar Dixon Expo Center in Gonzales, Louisiana after hearing Mayor Ray Nagin pleading for help on September 1, 2005. They did not know how they were going to help until they heard barking behind the Lamar Dixon Expo Center. McPhee spent the next four days taking thousands of photographs of displaced animals. Then McPhee decided to pick up his video camera and film the chaos as volunteers worked to save the animals while federal and state agencies tried to tie them down with bureaucratic red tape.

“A lot of local newscasters wanted to focus on rescues and reunions, but that’s not what I was really interested in doing,” McPhee said. “I wanted to tell a story of what was happening. ... I really wanted to see the human spirit.”

== Interviewees ==
- Jane Garrison single-handedly saved over 1,300 animals during Katrina. Jane is a long time animal activist and she founded Animal Rescue New Orleans (ARNO) as a response to Hurricane Katrina.
- Susan Benezeck and Lamonte Chenevert are residents of Louisiana who were forced to evacuate without their dog.
- Wayne Pacelle, chief executive officer of the Humane Society of the United States, tried to balance the bureaucracy of the authorities with the animal activism of the rescuers.
- Dr. Maxwell A. Lea, Jr., the State Veterinarian of the Louisiana Department of Agriculture, was a voice of authority during the crisis even though his expertise is eliminating livestock disease.
- Mark Steinway, co-founder and humane investigator of Pasado Safe Haven.
- Laura Maloney is the executive director of the LA/SPCA (Louisiana Society for the Prevention of Cruelty to Animals). A controversial figure, she is hailed as a hero by some and a hindrance to rescue operations by others.
- Chris Acosta is a resident of St. Bernard Parish, Louisiana who rescued many families during Katrina, including those left behind in St. Rita's Nursing Home.
- David Leeson is a Pulitzer Prize winning staff photographer at the Dallas Morning News who got footage of the St. Bernard Parish sheriff deputies shooting dogs in the street.
- Mimi Hunley is the Louisiana Assistant Attorney General with the Criminal Division who investigated the animal abuse that occurred during Katrina.

== Music ==
An American Opera features a soundtrack of mostly alternative rock, pop rock, ambient, grunge, indie, folk, and punk rock styles of music.

"The footage is set to a soundtrack of rock, punk and folk songs, often creating a seamless marriage between the lyrics, music and the events onscreen." Darren Schwindaman

== Reception ==
The film has received many positive reviews. The Detroit Free Press gave it 3 stars out of 4.

" This film is both heartbreaking and inspiring... Perhaps the biggest legacy this film will leave is the need to make a difference it imparts to those who view it." FilmGuru.net

"An American Opera is a moving, effective documentary which deserves some more attention." Choking on Popcorn

Aaron Lafferty from WOOD-TV calls it "powerful" and puts it on his Academy Award watch list.

An American Opera is also the "Dog People's Choice" on Woof Report.

=== Awards ===
An American Opera: The Greatest Pet Rescue Ever! has been the official film selection of 24 film festivals on four continents in 2007. It won the Gold Remi for Feature Documentary at the 40th Houston Worldfest, the Gold Camera for Public Issues and Concerns at the 40th U.S. International Film Festival, was the Jury's pick for Best Feature Documentary at the Sacramento Film and Music Festival, the Bronze for Feature Documentary at the ReelHeART International Film Festival in Toronto, and the Director's Choice Silver Medal in Best Impact of Music in a Documentary at the Park City Film and Music Festival.

== See also ==
- List of documentaries
