= Sergey Ponomarev (photographer) =

Russian photographer (born 1980)

- Сергей Игоревич Пономарёв
- Born: Sergey Igorevich Ponomarev; 11 December 1980 (age 45); Moscow, Russia
- Education: Moscow State University; Academy of Labour and Social Relations
- Occupation: Photographer
- Awards: Pulitzer Prize for Breaking News Photography (2016); Robert Capa Gold Medal (2017)
- Website: www.sergeyponomarev.com

Sergey Igorevich Ponomarev (Russian: Сергей Игоревич Пономарёв, 11 December 1980) is a Russian photographer.

In 2016 he shared a Pulitzer Prize for Breaking News Photography for coverage of the European migrant crisis. In 2017, he was awarded the Robert Capa Gold Medal (shared with Bryan Denton) for his coverage of the war in Iraq. He won World Press Photo awards in 2015, 2016 and 2017.

== Life and work ==
Ponomarev was born in Moscow and graduated from Moscow State University and from Academy of Labour and Social Relations. Between 2003 and 2012, Ponomarev worked for Associated Press, subsequently starting his career as a freelance photographer.

He is a frequent contributor to The New York Times. In 2015, The New York Times asked Ponomarev to go to Greece and photograph the landing of refugees. Subsequently, he followed refugees on their way to Western Europe, spending in total of five months on the project.

Ponomarev previously covered the Moscow theater hostage crisis in 2002, the Beslan school siege in 2004, the Euromaidan in Kyiv, the war in Donbas, and the Syrian Civil War.

According to James Nachtwey, "Sergey (Ponomarev')s visual perception operates at a very high level. He has the ability to organize what he perceives in a compelling, complex manner using the full range of photographic vocabulary with great mastery."

He sees his role "as simply developing stories that are meant to disturb the world", and he notes that restrictions imposed on viewing disturbing images diminishes their impact because "(t)he more people see injustice, the more they are willing to change it."

Ponomarev opposes the Russian invasion of Ukraine and left Russia on 1 March 2022, flying to Istanbul.

== Awards ==
- 2015: A double runner-up for a Pulitzer Prize for Breaking News Photography as a contributor to two of the three finalist portfolios, both for The New York Times. With Mauricio Lima, he was cited "for photographs that portrayed the conflict in Ukraine in an intimate way," specifically the Euromaidan protests and ensuing war, and for "capturing key moments in the human struggle in Gaza, and providing a fresh take on a long, bloody conflict."
- 2015: third prize of the World Press Photo award in the General News category for his photos of Gaza conflict.
- 2016: first prize, General News category, World Press Photo for the European migrant crisis photos.
- 2016: Shared a Pulitzer Prize for Breaking News Photography with Mauricio Lima, Tyler Hicks, and Daniel Etter "For photographs that captured the resolve of refugees, the perils of their journeys and the struggle of host countries to take them in." Specifically, their coverage of the European migrant crisis, produced for The New York Times, was cited. He became the second Pulitzer Prize winner from Russia, after Alexander Zemlianichenko (1997).
- 2017: Robert Capa Gold Medal (shared with Bryan Denton) for his coverage of the war in Iraq.
- 2017: Second prize stories, General News category, World Press Photo.
