= 1982 Pulitzer Prize =

Awards for journalism and related fields

The Pulitzer Prizes for 1982 are:

== Journalism awards ==
- Public Service:
  - The Detroit News, for exposing a cover-up in the U.S. Navy, which led to reforms in the Navy.
- Local General or Spot News Reporting:
  - Staff of The Kansas City Star and The Kansas City Times, for coverage of the disaster at the Hyatt Regency Hotel.
- Local Investigative Specialized Reporting:
  - Paul Henderson of The Seattle Times for proving a man's innocence in a rape investigation.
- National Reporting:
  - Rick Atkinson of The Kansas City Times, for maintaining a high quality of reporting on issues of national interest.
- International Reporting:
  - John Darnton of The New York Times, for his reporting from Poland.
- Feature Writing:
  - Saul Pett of the Associated Press, for an article on federal bureaucracy
- Commentary:
  - Art Buchwald of Los Angeles Times Syndicate, for his outstanding commentary.
- Criticism:
  - Martin Bernheimer of the Los Angeles Times, for his classical music criticism.
- Editorial Writing:
  - Jack Rosenthal of The New York Times
- Editorial Cartooning:
  - Ben Sargent of the Austin American-Statesman
- Spot News Photography:
  - Ron Edmonds of the Associated Press, for his photographs covering the assassination attempt of Ronald Reagan.
- Feature Photography:
  - John H. White of the Chicago Sun-Times, for his consistently excellent photographs.

== Letters, Drama and Music Awards ==
- Fiction:
  - Rabbit Is Rich by John Updike (Knopf)
- Drama:
  - A Soldier's Play, by Charles Fuller (Hill and Wang)
- History:
  - Mary Chesnut's Civil War, edited by C. Vann Woodward (Yale U. Press)
- Biography or Autobiography:
  - Grant: A Biography by William McFeely (Norton)
- Poetry:
  - The Collected Poems by Sylvia Plath (a posthumous publication) (Harper & Row)
- General Nonfiction:
  - The Soul of a New Machine by Tracy Kidder (Atlantic-Little )
- Music:
  - Concerto for Orchestra, by Roger Sessions (E. B. Marks Music)
