= Willard Straight Hall =

- Cornell University
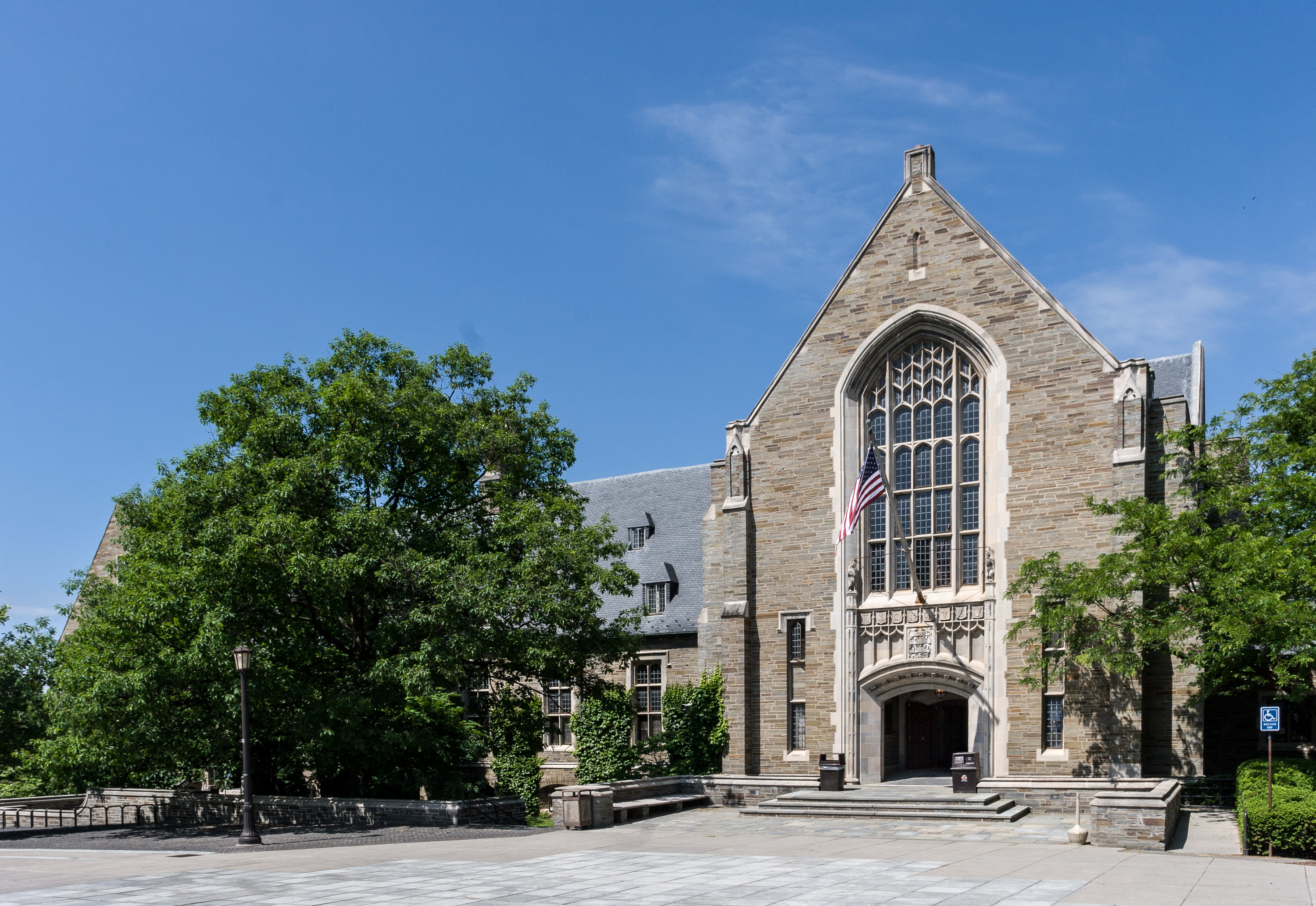
- Willard Straight Hall at Cornell University in June 2007
- Alternative names: "The Straight”

General information
- Type: Student union
- Architectural style: College Gothic
- Location: Ithaca, New York, U.S., Ho Plaza
- Coordinates: 42.4465°N 76.4855°W
- Opened: 1925
- Owner: Cornell University

Design and construction
- Architect: Delano & Aldrich

Website
- scl.cornell.edu/residential-life/housing/community-centers/willard-straight-hall-student-union

Willard Straight Hall is the student union building on the central campus of Cornell University in Ithaca, New York. Conceived as a memorial to Willard Dickerman Straight, its construction was initiated by his widow, Dorothy Payne Whitney Straight, with the aim of enriching student life. Designed by architect William Adams Delano in a Gothic Revival style and built from local "llenroc" bluestone, the hall opened in November 1925 after 20 months of construction. From its inception, the building has housed social, cultural, and recreational spaces for students, and its policies have been set by a student-led governing board.

The hall has been the site of notable events in Cornell's history, including the April 1969 protest by African-American students during a period of racial tension on campus, which influenced the creation of the University Senate, changes to the Board of Trustees, a new judicial system, and the establishment of the Africana Studies and Research Center. It has continued to serve as a hub for student activities, evolving to include dining facilities, performance and meeting spaces, and offices for student organizations.

== History ==
=== 19th century ===
Willard Straight Hall's construction was initiated by Willard Straight's widow, Dorothy Payne Whitney as a memorial to her husband. The building was intended to lead to "the enrichment of the human contacts of student life," according to remarks given by Straight at the hall's dedication. Cornell historian Corey Earle notes that, at the time, "it was unusual to have a building with no academic purpose." The concept of a student union building initiated in 1896 with the opening of Houston Hall at the University of Pennsylvania in Philadelphia.

=== 20th century ===
In 1918, recently widowed, Dorothy Whitney Straight met a Cornell Agriculture student, Leonard Knight Elmhirst, who persuaded her to visit the campus. Elmhirst and Straight together with certain faculty members decided that the best realization of Willard Straight's wish that some of his estate be used to make Cornell a more "human place" was to build a student union building. Elmhirst graduated from Cornell and left for India in 1921.

For the next three years, Dorothy Straight oversaw planning for Willard Straight Memorial Hall, which was to be built with part of her Whitney family fortune in addition to Willard Straight's bequest. The cornerstone was laid on June 15, 1924, and the dedication ceremony was held on November 25, 1925. Elmhirst and Dorothy Straight married in April 1925.

When Willard Straight Hall opened its doors in 1925, it was still one of only a few such structures in the country dedicated to student life. However, Cornell provided on-campus space for student organizations since its earliest days. In January 1870, Andrew Dickson White allocated a large room in the middle section of White Hall to be used as a "Society Hall." White donated $1,000 to furnish it subject to $300 in matching gifts from student organizations. Barnes Hall was later built to house the Students’ Christian Association in 1888.

Leonard Elmhirst came from a land-owning family in Yorkshire, England. The seeds for his study of agriculture in Ithaca, New York, and subsequent Dartington Hall School and "Institute for Rural Reconstruction' in the agriculturally impoverished England of the 1920s were sown on his first visit to India during World War I.

== Design ==
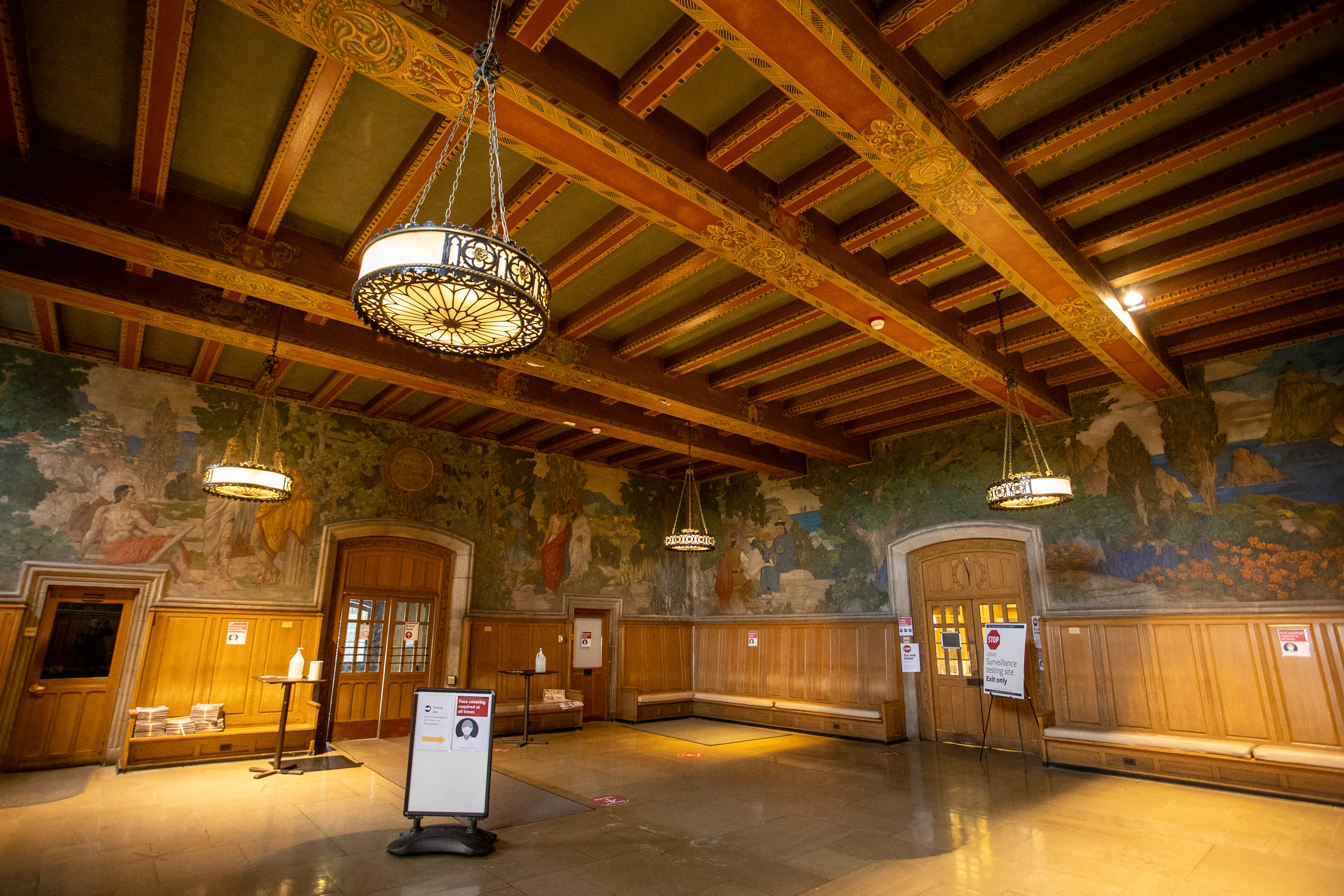
Murals in the North lobby

Willard Straight Memorial Hall was designed by a noted architect of the day, William Adams Delano, and constructed from the local "llenroc" bluestone, a feldspathic sandstone; the architectural model for its Gothic Revival style may have been the 14th-century Dartington Hall in Devon, which the newlyweds purchased in 1925.

Murals in the lobby by Ezra Winter date from 1926 and represent Willard Straight's business interests in China, and his enthusiasm for the arts. The murals depict virtues as chivalry, adventure, diplomacy, creativity, and optimism.

Above the main entrance of the building, unofficial shields of the colleges are displayed. While the shields are not used as official graphic material or as visual identity for each college, similar inspired designs are employed in symbolic banners used at commencement ceremonies.

Shields of the Colleges
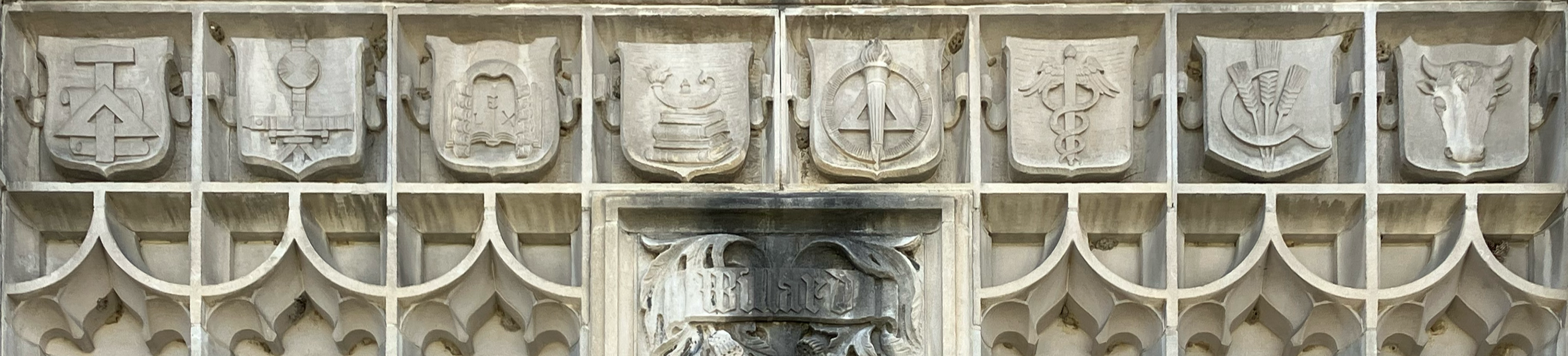

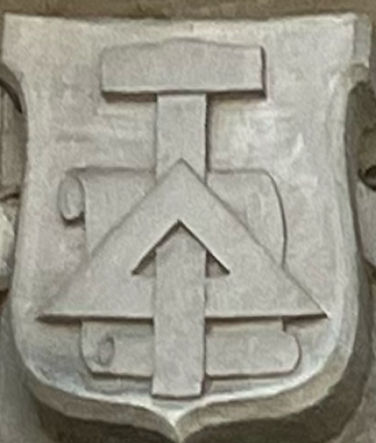
Architecture Art and Planning

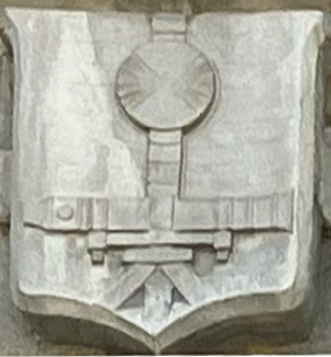
Engineering

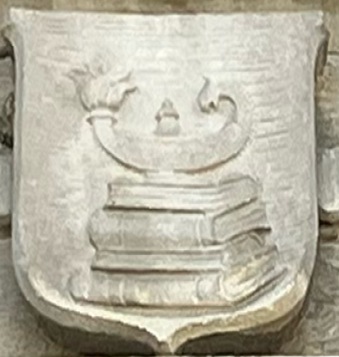
Arts and Sciences

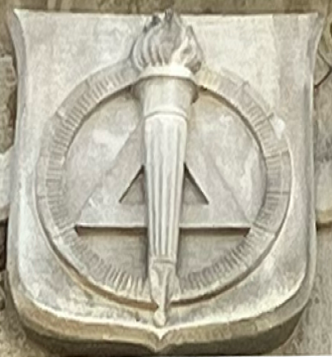
Graduate School

== History ==
=== Opening ===
Willard Straight Hall opened in November 1925, following 20 months of construction at a cost of $1.5 million to construct, and $100,000 to furnish. 4,800 people streamed into the building to see it on opening day, and 3,000 more on the following day. Access to the building was by membership only. All undergraduates were automatically members, but faculty, trustees, and grad students could pay for the privilege at $8 per year, and alumni could join for $5 per year.

=== Access for women ===
Willard Straight Hall

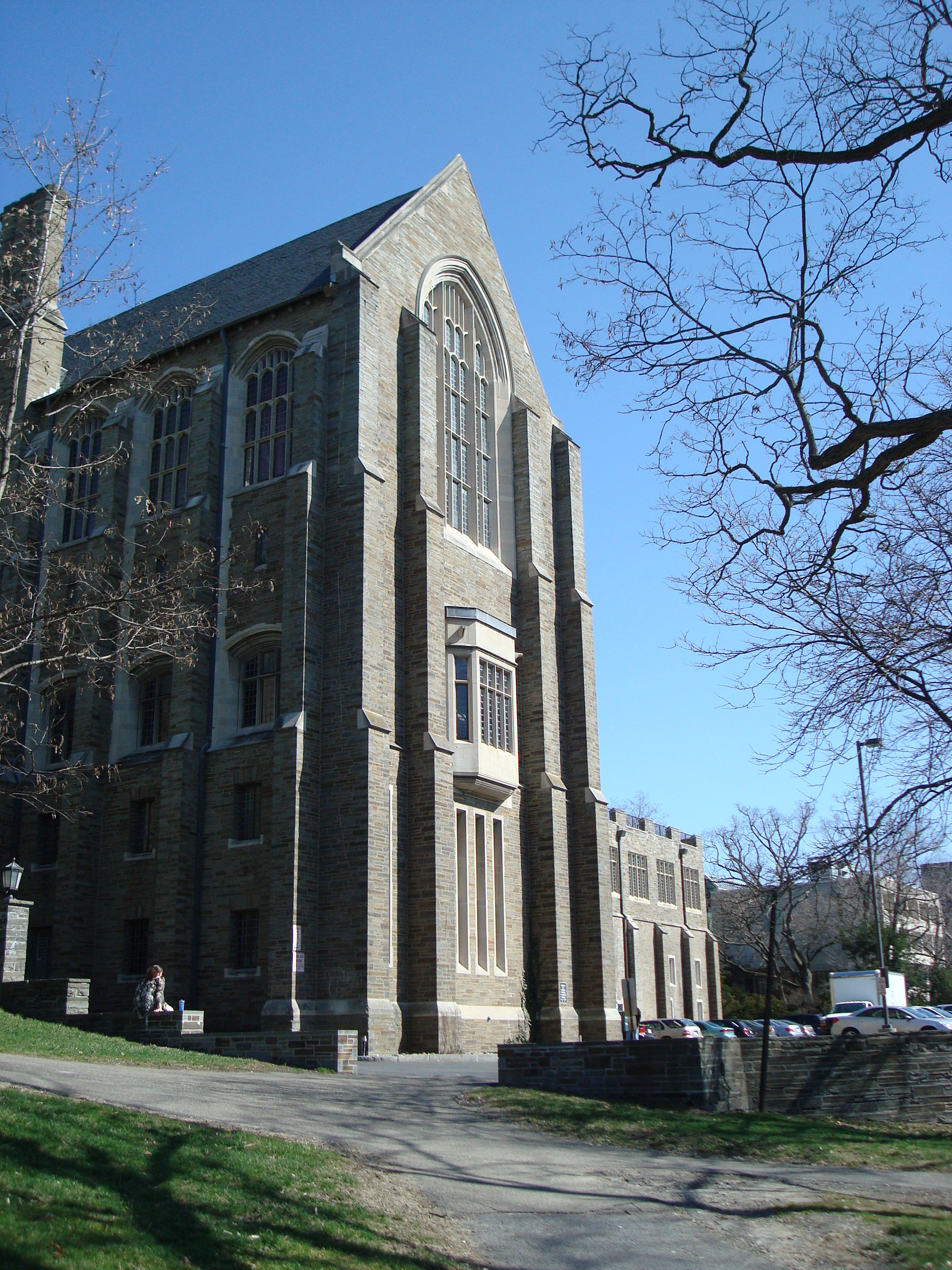
Western façade on Libe Slope

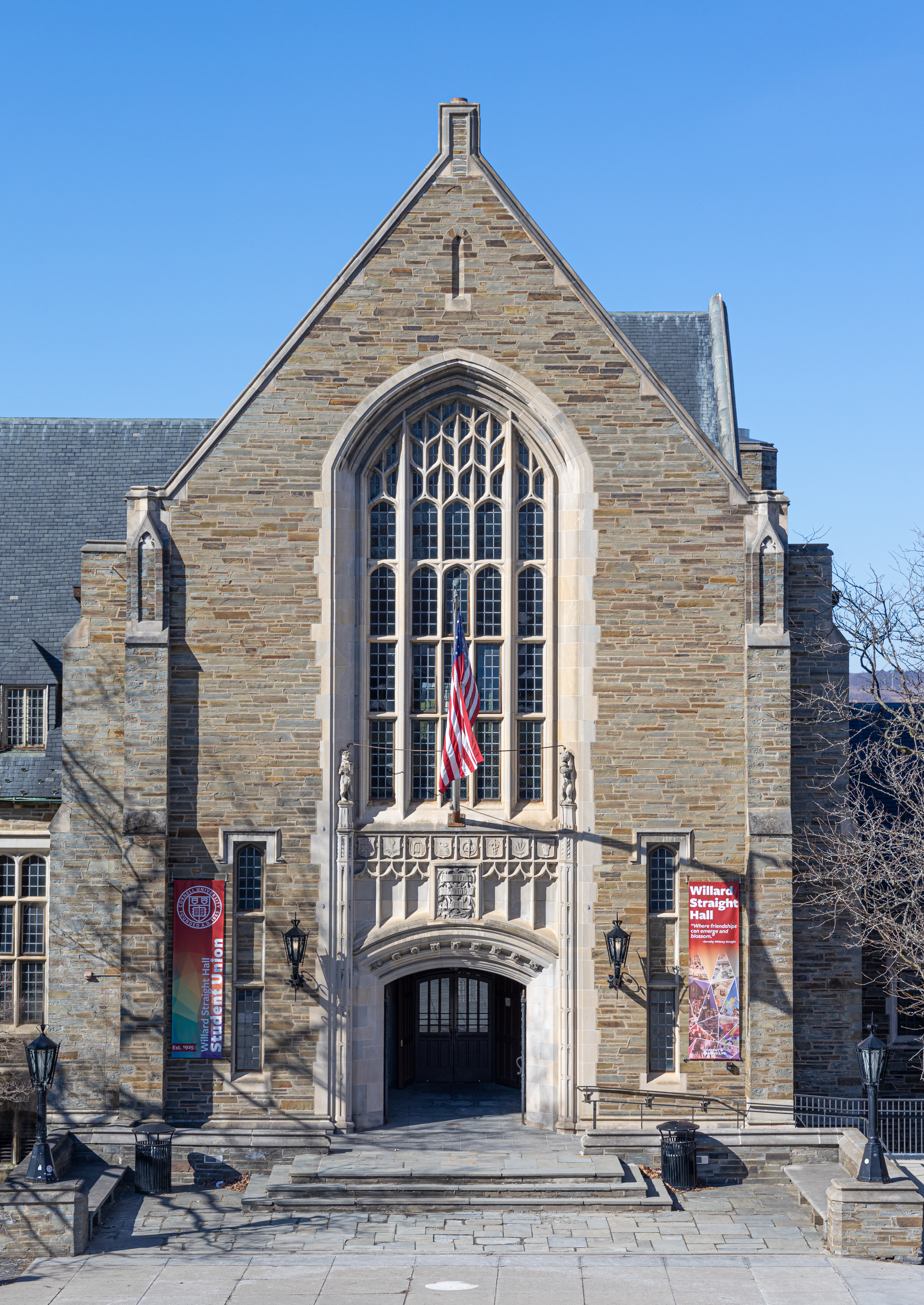
The North Lobby entrance on the eastern side of the building on Ho Plaza. This entrance was previously limited to use by men.

Dorothy Straight's preference was for the building to be equally accessible to men and women, but she encountered strong faculty opposition. As a compromise, the larger main entrance would be restricted to men, and women would be permitted to enter via the smaller south entrance; Straight's hope was that women would subsequently have access to the main central area of the building. However, on the building's opening in 1925, women were restricted to the use to two lounges and a rest room near the south entrance. Ten years later, the food service areas were opened to women. During World War II, women were given access to the entire building except the barber shop. It was not until 1977 that the barber shop, and thus the whole building, was finally integrated to both sexes.

From Willard Straight Hall's opening, the main desk was staffed by undergraduate students. In addition, the building's policies are set, updated, and enforced by the student-led Willard Straight Hall Board of Governors, more commonly known on campus as the Willard Straight Hall Student Union Board (SUB).

Prior to 1969, the upper floors of the Straight served as a hotel for Cornell's visitors and guests. The broadcast studios of the WVBR Radio station were in a lower level. The building also housed the University Theatre, where until 1988 the Cornell Dramatic Club (formed in 1925 from the merger of the Dramatic Club and the Women's Dramatic Club) staged almost 50 performances a year.

As Cornell built more dormitories on the West Campus and the North Campus, two additional buildings supplemented the Straight to serve students: Noyes Center on West Campus and the North Campus Union (now Robert Purcell Community Center) on North Campus. The combined operation constituted the Department of University Unions. In 1970, with the advent of the University Senate, University Unions became a part of the new Division of Campus Life. In order to end duplication and tensions between the University Unions and the Dean of Students Office, University Unions merged into the latter department.

=== 1969 building takeover ===
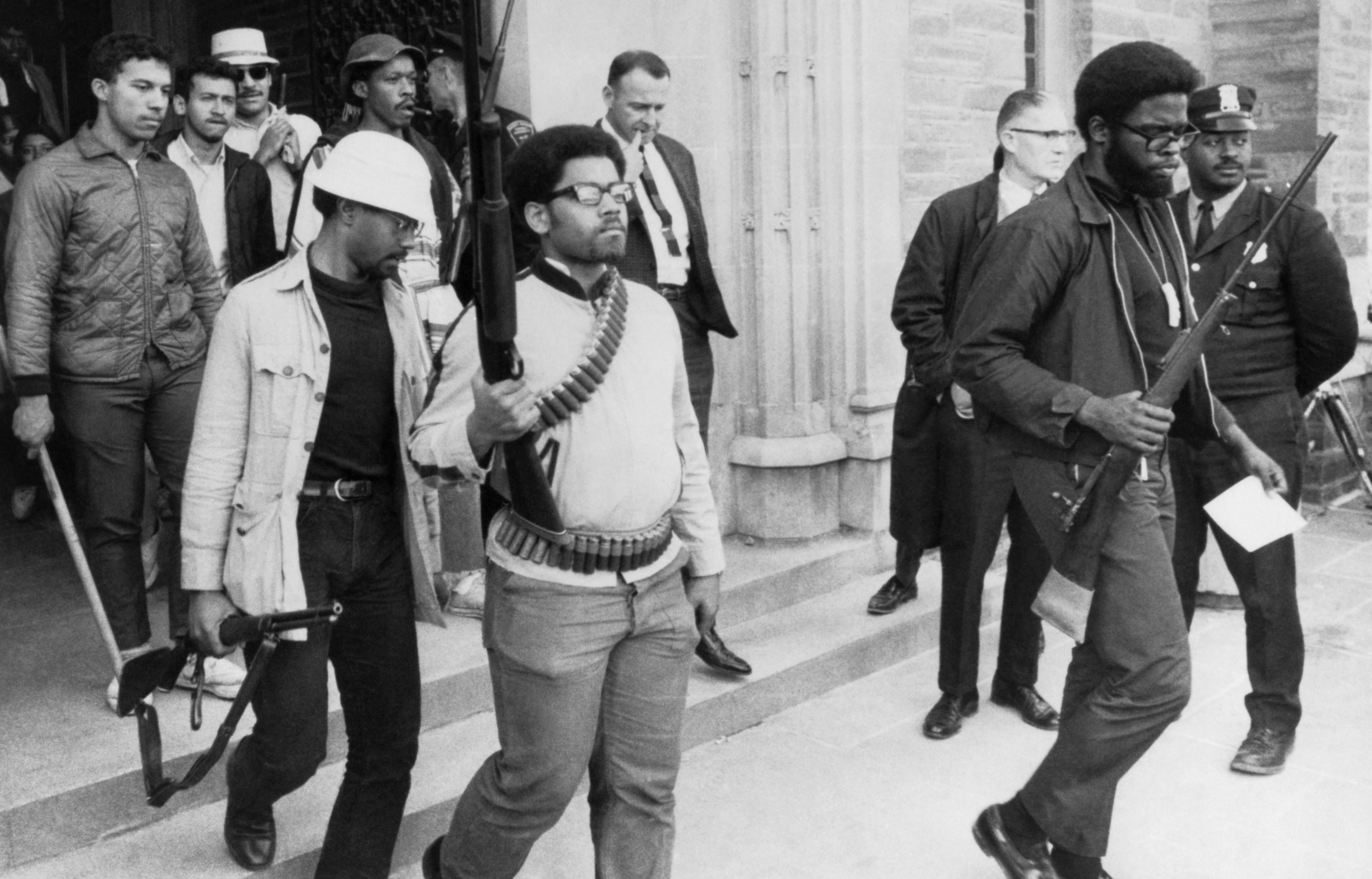
Armed protestors leave Willard Straight Hall after negotiating an end to their 1969 takeover of the building; the following year, this photograph of the protesters was awarded the 1970 Pulitzer Prize for photography.

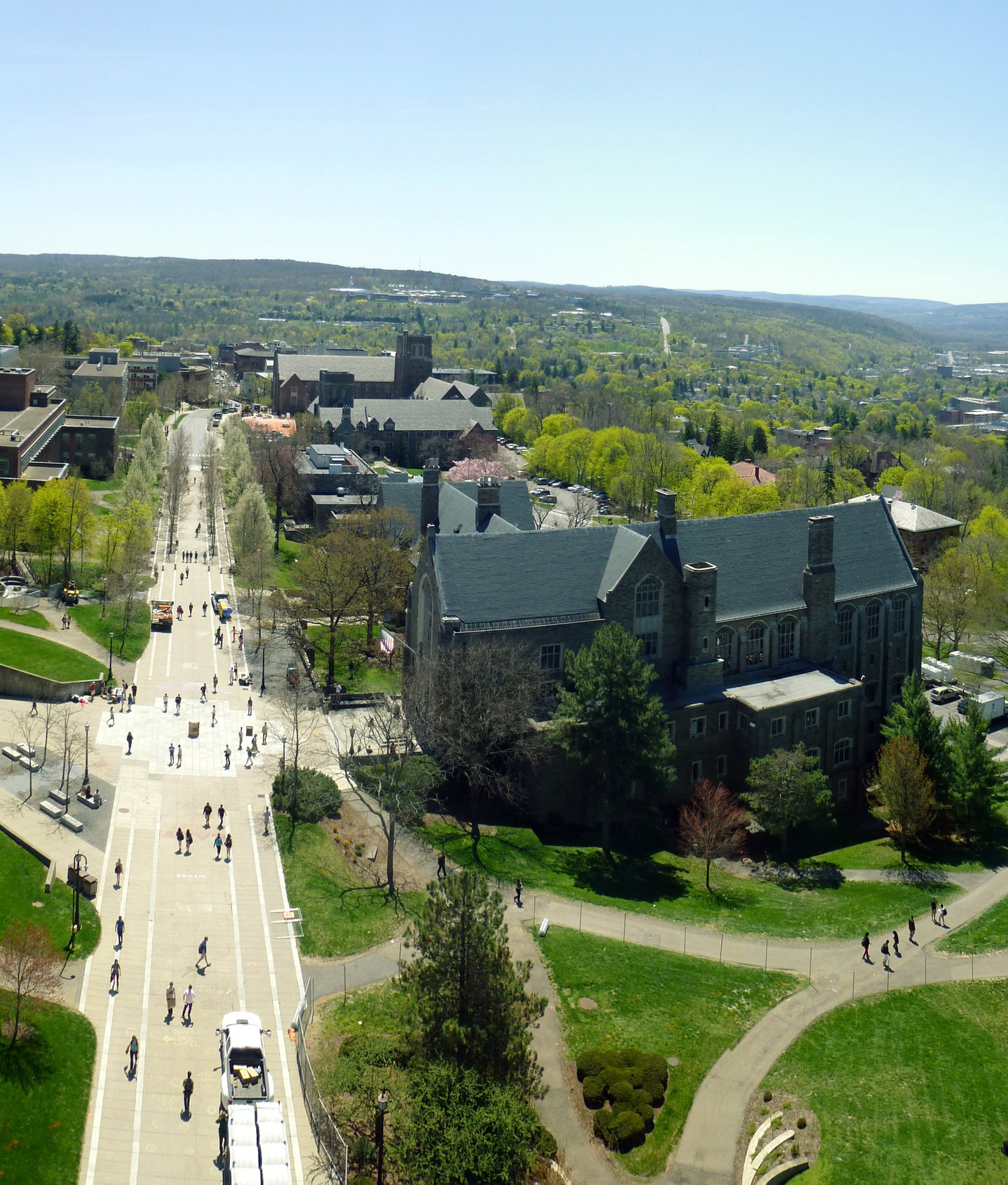
Willard Straight Hall and Ho Plaza as seen from McGraw Tower

In the 1968–69 school year, the university judicial system was the center of a controversy in connection with the disciplining of African-American students who had engaged in a protest. It was also directly related to the burning of a cross on the lawn of the Wari House, the dormitory for African-American women on campus. (Ithaca police reportedly suspected, but never proved, that the cross was burned by members of the campus Afro-American Society as a pretext for further protest). As racial tensions escalated, some African-American students demanded amnesty for the accused protesters as well as the establishment of an Africana Studies center. On April 19, 1969, some of them occupied Willard Straight Hall, ejecting parents who were visiting for "Parents Weekend" from the hotel rooms on the upper floors. Subsequently, white students from Delta Upsilon fraternity unsuccessfully attempted to retake the building by force. Some of the occupying students left the building and returned with firearms in case of a further attack.

During much of that day and into the evening, the Students for a Democratic Society (SDS), led by C. David Burak, organized continuous, supportive picketing in front of the Hall's main entrance, consisting of a circle of about 50 marchers at a time. Late that evening, the picketing was replaced by having a limited number of volunteers form a protective cordon outside the building, overnight. The idea, according to a sympathetic faculty member, Professor Douglas F. Dowd, who recommended it, was to promote calm into the morning, by selecting volunteers "for their ability to keep calm in a crisis situation."

Ultimately, the Cornell, particularly Vice President Steven Muller, negotiated an end to the building takeover. The photos of the students marching out of the Straight carrying rifles and wearing bandoleers made the national news and won a Pulitzer Prize for Associated Press photographer Steve Starr.

On campus, the Straight takeover led to the formation of the University Senate, a restructuring of the Board of Trustees, a new campus judicial system, and the foundation of the Africana Studies and Research Center. By the end of the academic year, Cornell President James Perkins resigned. It also led to the creation of the Cornell Africana Studies and Research Center in late 1969, but the building it was housed in was burned down by a racially motivated arson attack less than a year after its creation.

Beyond Cornell, the Straight takeover led to the New York State Legislature enacting the Henderson Law, which required each college to adopt "Rules of the Maintenance of Public Order." Vice President Spiro Agnew referred to the Straight Takeover in speeches as an example of the excess of college students. Economist Thomas Sowell would later refer to the takeover as the result of policies intended to "increase minority student enrollment... by admitting students who would not meet the existing academic standards at Cornell." In Sowell's opinion, some of the militants accepted "turned out to be hoodlums who terrorized other black students".

=== 2017 protest ===
In a move reminiscent of the 1969 takeover, 300 marchers again occupied Willard Straight Hall for a few hours after presenting a list of demands to president Martha Pollack. The protest, led by Black Students United, was a response in part to the assault of a black Cornell student a few days earlier.

== Facilities ==
Willard Straight Hall has always served as a space for socializing and informal connection between students. Over the years, the building has evolved and changed significantly. At various times the building has featured an information desk, a Game Room with billiards and ping pong, a Browsing Library, a tea room (for women), a barber shop, movie theater, dining halls, an Art Room, a Music Room, a lost-and-found, a newsstand, a live performance theatre with orchestra pit and rotating stage, a ceramics studio, an ice cream shop, television lounges, spaces for meetings and coffeehouses, and offices for student organizations.

The building once held guest rooms on the fifth floor for alumni and visitors. A photographic darkroom opened in 1939, was expanded in 1973, and closed its doors in 2006. Celebrations were held to observe the building's 25th anniversary in 1950, and its 75th anniversary in 2000.

The Ivy Room was originally built as a mess hall for servicemen during World War II. In 2020, the Ivy Room closed. In 2021, its space permanently merged into Okenshields to offer expanded seating.

=== Current facilities ===
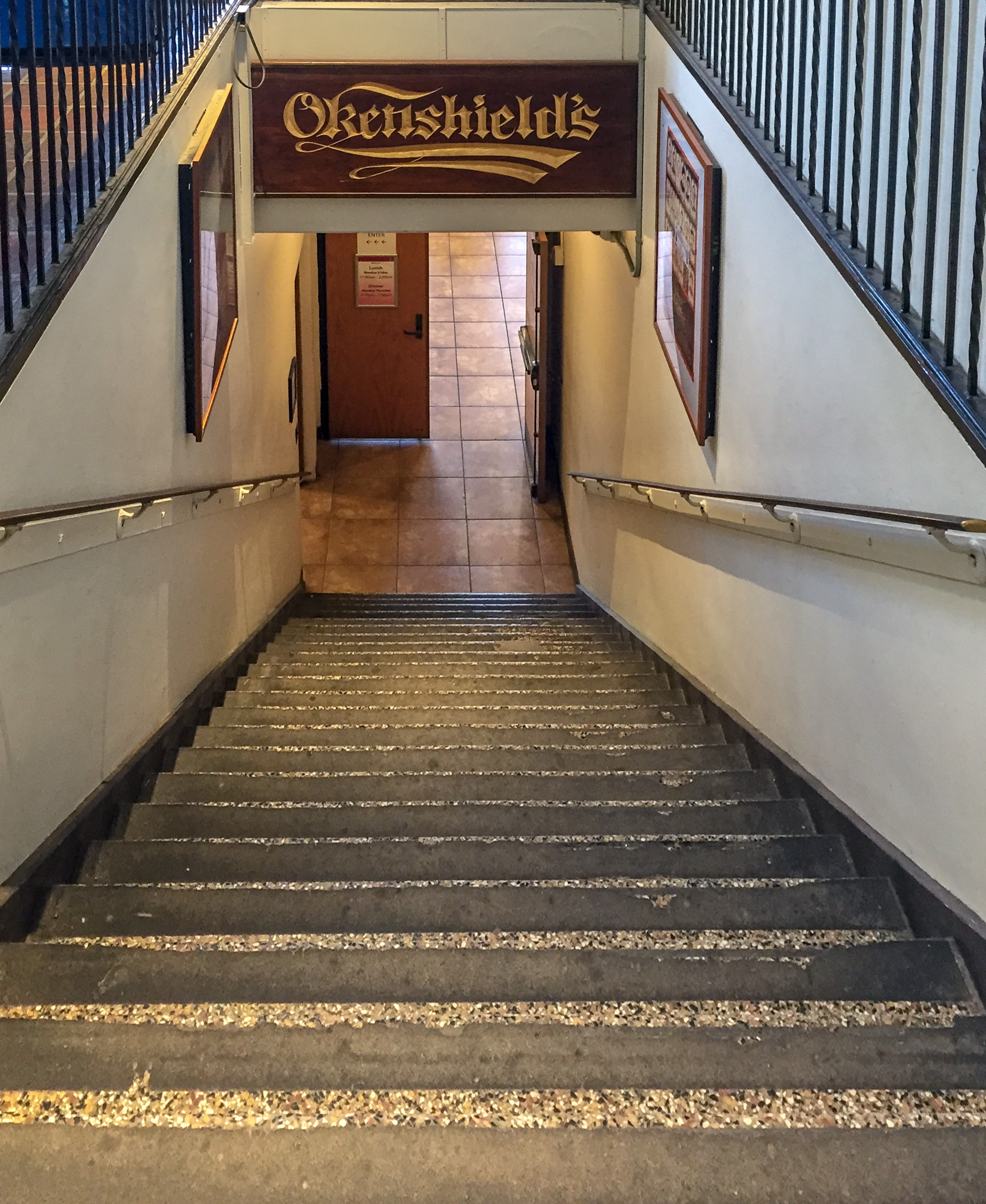
Okenshields Dining, located at the bottom of a stairwell

The building currently encloses two dining facilities, Okenshields and Straight from the Market, along with lounge spaces for students. A lounge on the south end of the building is named in honor of Leonard Elmhirst. Special facilities include: Several multi-purpose rooms used for dance and performance troupes, Cornell Cinema (in the Straight Theater), a full service digital computer lab, newly remodeled 2nd floor Elizabeth Staley Office of Student Support and Diversity Education, 5th floor Student Activities Office, Office of Fraternity and Sorority Affairs, offices and mailboxes for student organizations, the 4th Floor WSH Art Gallery, and the Browsing Library, International Lounge, and Music Room. It formerly housed the Cornell Ceramics Studio, which closed in May 2011. A long-running joke among students concerns the placement of a power outlet on the ceiling of the staircase leading down to the Ivy Room.

The offices of Cornell Cinema and the Dean of Students Office are also in the building.

During the Fall 2020 Semester, a COVID-19 surveillance testing facility opened on the 4th floor of the building.

=== Considered renovations ===
By the late 2010s, university officials had identified several constraints on Willard Straight Hall’s continued use as Cornell’s central student union. The building’s reservable spaces were described as insufficient for a campus that had grown from about 5,600 students in 1925 to more than 24,000 students. Its aging heating, ventilation, electrical, and acoustic systems also limited modern uses, including videoconferencing and air conditioning. The building’s historic layout created accessibility challenges, with limited elevator service and some floors reachable only by stairs. Cornell has considered a major renovation and expansion to modernize the building while preserving its historic character.
