= Oded Balilty =

Israeli documentary photographer (born 1979)

Oded Balilty עודד בלילטי
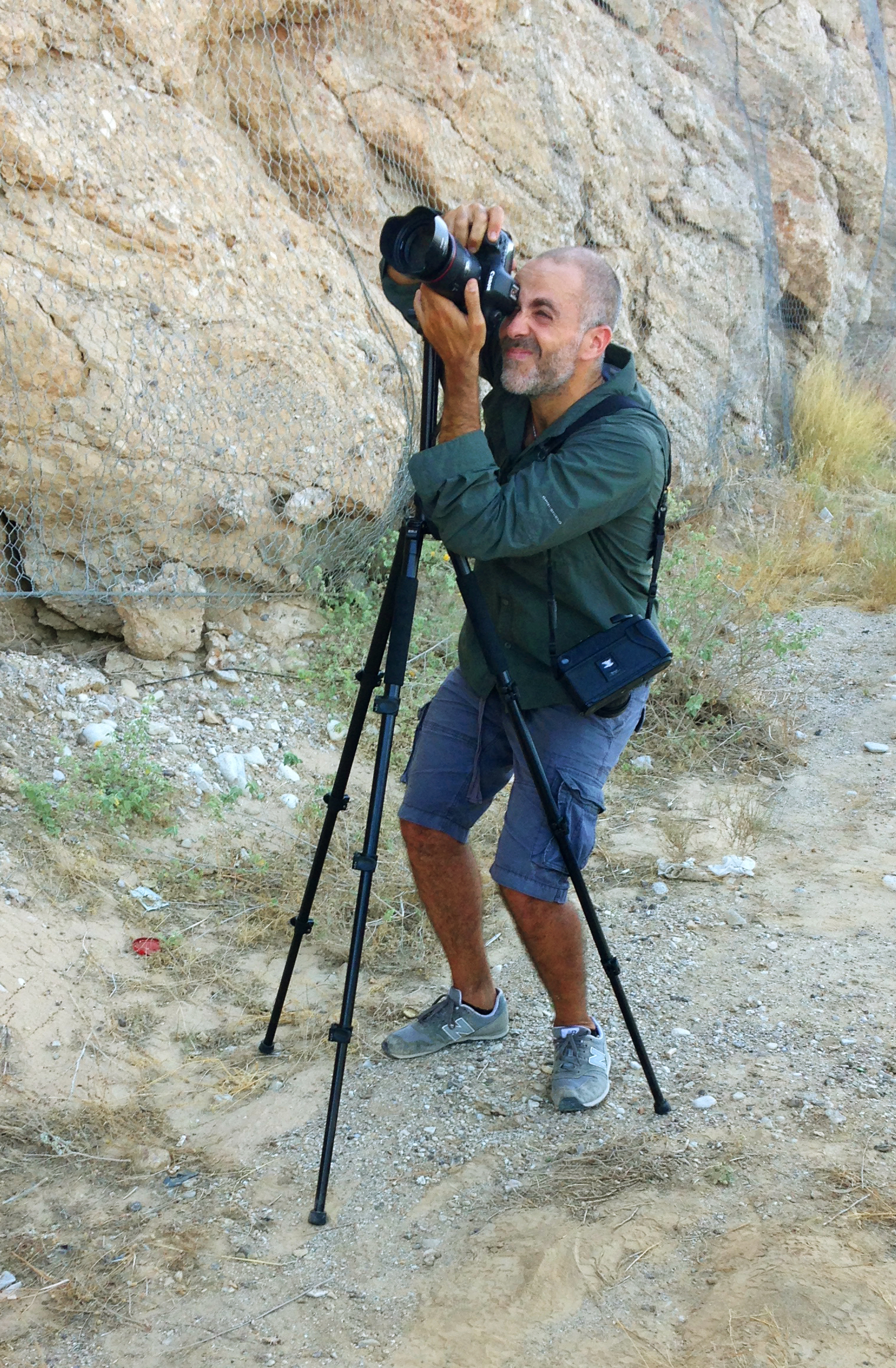
- Balilty at work, Israel 2016
- Born: 30 March 1979 (age 47); Jerusalem
- Occupation: Documentary photographer

Oded Balilty (Hebrew: עודד בלילטי; born March 30, 1979, Jerusalem) is an Israeli documentary photographer. He is an Associated Press (AP) photographer and won the Pulitzer Prize for Breaking News Photography in 2007.

== Biography ==
Oded Balilty is a Pulitzer Prize-winning Israeli photographer. Born and raised in Jerusalem, he began his career as a photographer for the Israeli army magazine Bamahane. In 2002, at the height of the second Palestinian uprising, he joined The Associated Press. In 2007, he won the Pulitzer Prize for his photograph of a lone Jewish settler confronting Israeli security officers during the evacuation of a West Bank settlement outpost. He is the only Israeli photographer to ever receive the Pulitzer Prize. From 2007–2008, he was based in Beijing for AP. Balilty lives in Tel Aviv and photographs current events and documentary features for AP in Israel, Palestine, and around the world.

== Solo exhibitions ==
- 2015 “Sabra Traces” Eretz Israel Museum" Tel Aviv
- 2014 “In Observation” Projex Connect, San Francisco
- 2013 “Restraint,” N&N Gallery, Tel Aviv, Israel
- 2013 “Israel, Soviet Style,” Russian Photo Forum, Moscow, Russia
- 2011 "Marginal Notes" N&N Amana Gallery, Tel Aviv
- 2009 POV Photo festival in Tel Aviv
- 2009 "Hide and Seek" at the Artist House in Jerusalem
- 2008 "China", photo festival of Gijon, Spain
- 2007 “Chernobyl Today”, Coalmine photo gallery, Zurich, Switzerland
- 2007 Lucca Digital Photo Festival, Italy
- 2007 Musée d'ethnographie de Neuchâtel, Switzerland
- 2005 Coalmine photo gallery, Zurich, Switzerland
- 2006 “Chernobyl Today”, festival du Scoop, Angers, France
- 2000 "Reflected Reality" (with artist Anna Shapira), Z.O.A House, Tel-Aviv

== Selected group exhibitions ==
- 2014 “The Double Exposure Project” Shpilman Institute For Photography, Tel Aviv
- 2012 International Photography Festival, Tel Aviv, Israel
- 2011 Ashdod Museum – A road to nowhere
- 2008 Yad Vashem Holocaust museum, Jerusalem, portraits of Holocaust survivors
- 2005 joint exhibition of Israeli and Palestinian photographers, War photography museum, Dubrovnik, Croatia
- 2004 "AP Jerusalem", VISA pour L'image Perpignan, France

== Awards ==
- 2014 National Headliner Award (1st place portrait category)
- 2014 NPPA Awards (Honorable Mention portrait category)
- 2014 Picture of the Year International (2nd place, Portrait series)
- 2013 Atlanta Photojournalism Seminar (1st place portrait and 2nd place sport feature)
- 2013 Overseas Press Club of America (Feature Photography)
- 2012 China International Press Photo Contest (1st place in daily life category, 2nd place in daily life and sports feature categories)
- 2012 Atlanta Photojournalism Seminar (1st place, pictorial category)2012 Picture of the Year International (1st place, portrait)
- 2012 Henri Nannen Prize Nomination2009 PX3 (3rd place in photojournalism general news)
- 2009 Pulitzer Prize finalist (with group of Associated Press photographers for photos of Sichuan earthquake)
- 2009 Picture of the Year International (Award of Excellence for “Ping Pong Nation” and coverage of Sichuan earthquake)
- 2009 PGB Award (1st place for coverage of Sichuan earthquake)
- 2009 National Headliner Awards (Photography Portfolio)
- 2009 NPPA Awards (Honorable Mention, Natural Disaster)
- 2008 World Press Photo (3rd place, People in the News)
- 2008 Picture of the Year International (3rd place, news picture story)
- 2008 APME (for coverage of Sichuan earthquake)
- 2008 UNICEF Photo of the Year (2nd place, coverage of Sichuan earthquake)
- 2008 Atlanta Photojournalism Seminar (awards in five categories for China photography)
- 2007 National Geographic All Roads Photography Program
- 2007 Pulitzer Prize for Breaking News Photography
- 2007 World Press Photo (1st place, People in the News)
- 2007 Germany Lead Awards (1st place, Photography Category)
- 2007 Picture of the Year International (1st place, Human Conflict)
- 2007 International Headliner Award (1st place)
- 2007 NPPA (1st and 2nd place)
- 2007 National Headliner Award (1st prize for Magazines, News Services, Syndicates – Spot News Photography)
- 2007 Sigma Delta Chi Award (Spot News Photography)
- 2007 APME Award (with group of photographers, for coverage of 2006 Israel-Lebanon War)
- 2006 UNICEF Photo of the Year (Honorable Mention, Single Picture)
- 2006 Atlanta Photojournalism Seminar (1st place, Best in Show)
- 2006 Atlanta Photojournalism Seminar (1st place, Spot News)
- 2006 Editor and Publisher Award (1st place for Multiple Images Photo Essay, Honorable Mention for Single Picture)
- 2004 Editor and Publisher Award (1st place for multiple images/photo essays)
- 2003 APME News Photography Award (with AP photographers, for coverage of violence in the Middle East)
