= Steve Starr =

American photographer

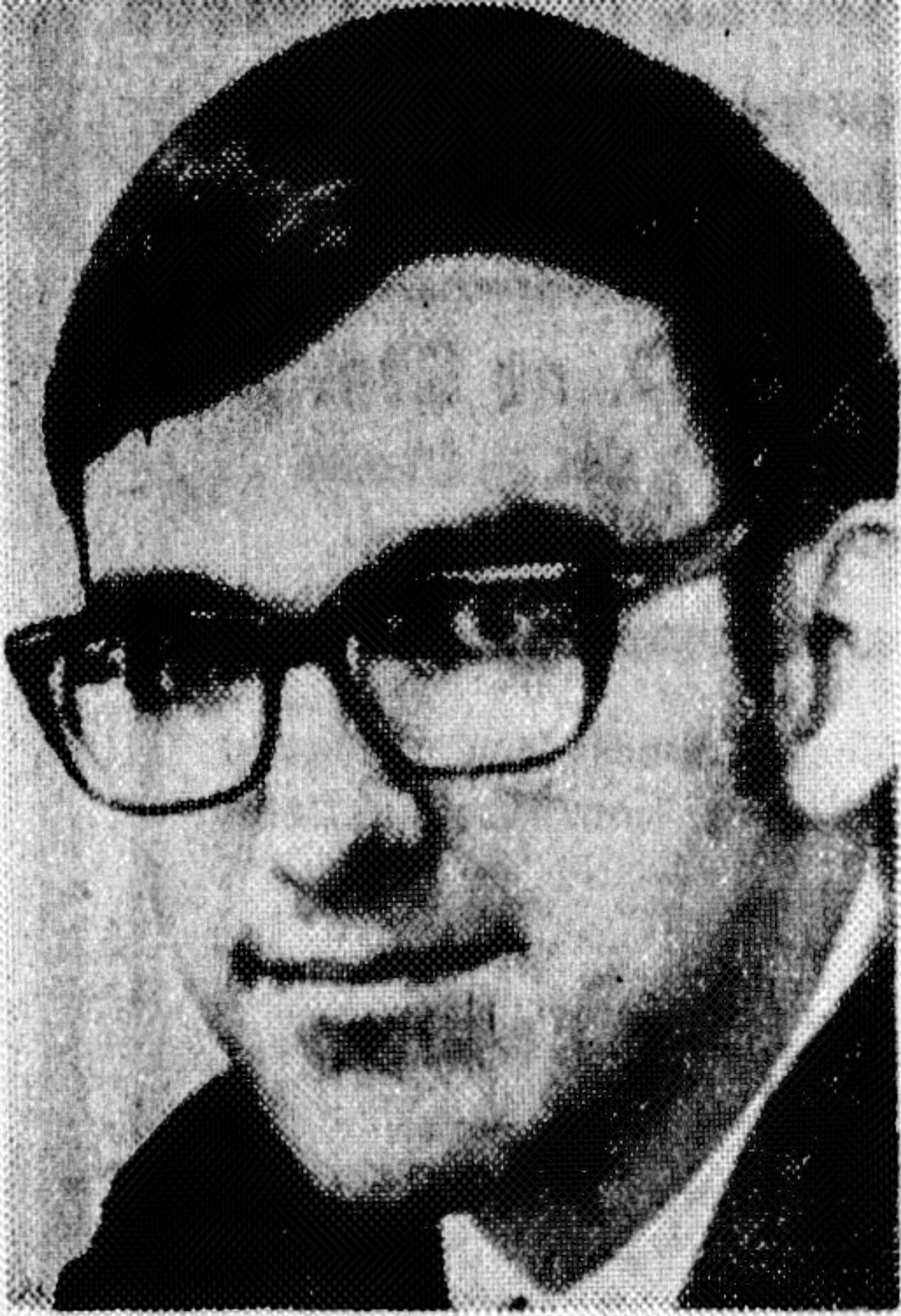
- Starr c. 1970
- Education: San José State University
- Occupation: Photographer
- Awards: Pulitzer Prize for Breaking News Photography, 1970

Steve Starr is a Pulitzer Prize-winning American photographer. He has since retired from photography, and since 2014, has served as a Third Order Franciscan Brother at Grace and St. Stephen's Episcopal Church in Colorado Springs.

== Education ==
Starr attended San José State University, and graduated with a Bachelor of Arts degree in journalism in 1967.

== Career ==
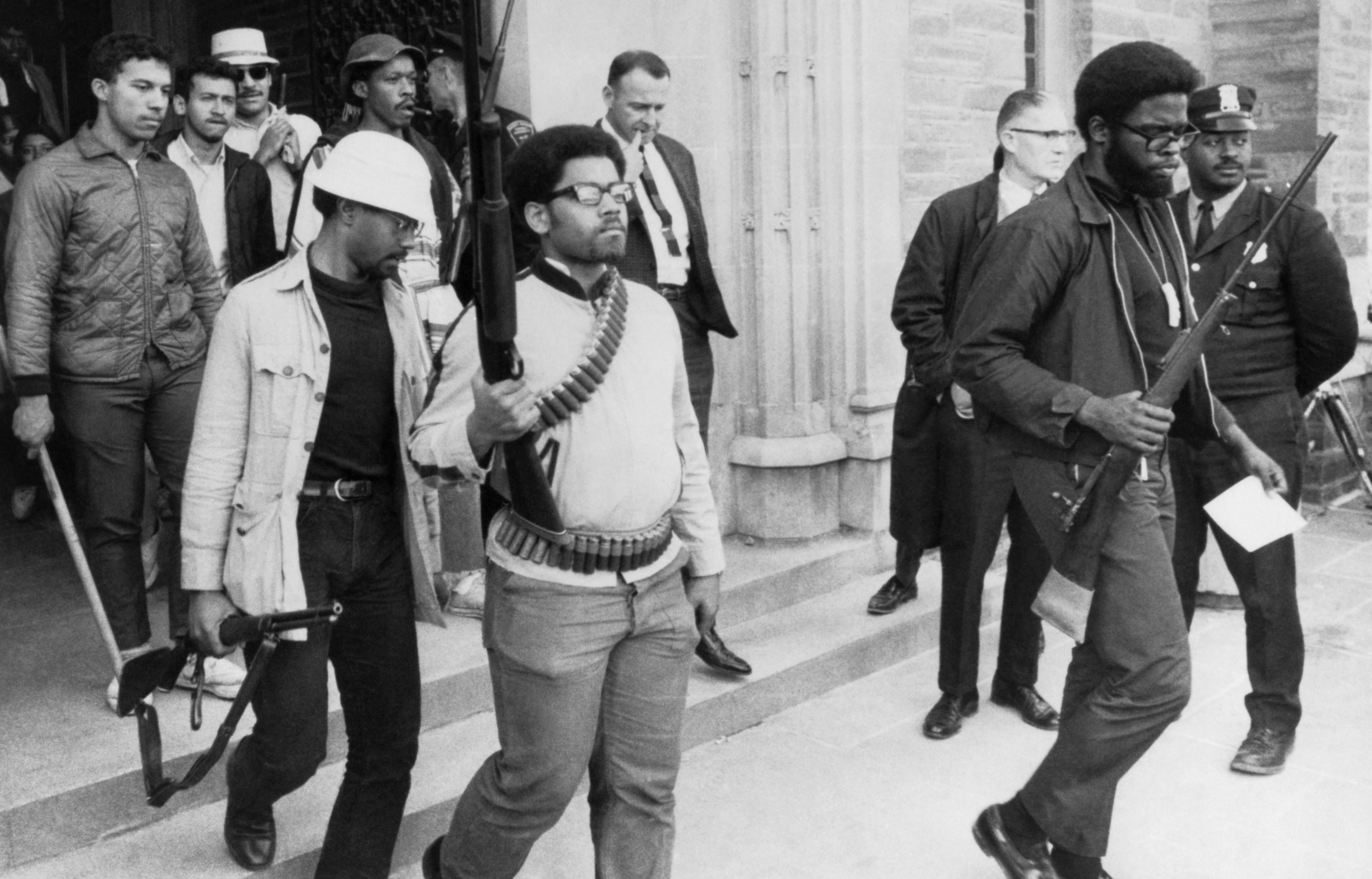
Starr's April 1969 photo of armed African-American student Vietnam War protesters at Cornell University was awarded the 1970 Pulitzer Prize for Breaking News Photography

Starr worked at Associated Press bureaus in Los Angeles, New York City, Albany, New York, and Miami.

In 1970, his photograph the prior year, "Campus Guns", of armed African-American protesters leaving Willard Straight Hall at Cornell University after negotiating an end to their occupation of the building, was awarded the Pulitzer Prize for Breaking News Photography.

== Personal life ==
Starr married Marilynne Starr, whom he met as a San Jose State University student. He lives in Colorado Springs, Colorado. In 2020, he began work on an autobiography about his career and experiences as a photojournalist and as a Franciscan brother.

== Awards ==
- May 4, 1970: Pulitzer Prize for Spot News Photography

== Works ==
- "Guns on Campus", 1969
- "Mourners at the Columbine Memorial", 1999
