= Leonard Baker =

American writer (1931–1984)

- Born: January 24, 1931; Pittsburgh, Pennsylvania, U.S.
- Died: November 23, 1984 (aged 53); Washington, D.C., U.S.
- Education: University of Pittsburgh
- Writing career
- Notable works: Days of Sorrow and Pain: Leo Baeck and the Berlin Jews

Leonard S. Baker (January 24, 1931 – November 23, 1984) was an American writer.

He won the 1979 Pulitzer Prize for Biography or Autobiography for Days of Sorrow and Pain: Leo Baeck and the Berlin Jews (Oxford University Press, ISBN 0-19-502800-7), a book about Leo Baeck.

His other published works include The Johnson Eclipse: A President's Vice Presidency, Back to Back: The Duel Between FDR and the Supreme Court, John Marshall: A Life in Law, Brandeis and Frankfurter: A Dual Biography, Brahmin in Revolt, Roosevelt and Pearl Harbor, and The Guaranteed Society.

A 1952 graduate of the University of Pittsburgh's School of Arts and Sciences, Baker was a reporter for the St. Louis Globe-Democrat from 1955 to 1956 and for Newsday from 1956 to 1965. He was married to Liva Baker (1930–2007), author of The Justice From Beacon Hill: The Life and Times of Oliver Wendell Holmes and other books, and had two children, David Baker and Sara Baker.
