= Elliot G. Jaspin =

American journalist

- Born: May 27, 1946; Mineola, New York
- Education: Colby College
- Occupation: Journalist
- Spouse: Janet Gail Thomas

Elliot G. Jaspin (born May 27, 1946) is a Pulitzer Prize-winning American journalist.

Jaspin graduated from Baldwin Senior High School in 1964 and Colby College in 1969.

While writing for the Pottsville, Pennsylvania Republican & Herald, he won the 1979 Pulitzer Prize for Investigative Reporting with Gilbert M. Gaul for stories on the destruction of the Blue Coal Company by men with ties to organized crime.

In the same year, Jaspin won a Scripps Howard Foundation Edward J. Meeman Award and an American Bar Association Silver Gavel Award.

== Published works ==
- Jaspin, Elliot (2006). Buried in the Bitter Waters: The Hidden History of Racial Cleansing in America. New York: Basic Books. ISBN 0-465-03636-8.
