= Tyler Hicks =

American photojournalist

- Born: São Paulo, São Paulo, Brazil
- Education: Staples High School (Connecticut)
- Alma mater: Boston University College of Communication
- Occupation: Photojournalist
- Awards: Robert Capa Gold Medal (2013); Pulitzer Prize for Breaking News Photography (2014, 2016)

Tyler Portis Hicks is a photojournalist who works as a staff photographer for The New York Times. Based in Kenya, he covers foreign news for the newspaper with an emphasis on conflict and war.

== Early life and education ==
Hicks was born in São Paulo, Brazil. He graduated from Staples High School in Westport, Connecticut, in 1988, and went on to Boston University College of Communication, where he earned a degree in Journalism in 1992.

== Life and work ==
Hicks was a freelance photographer based in Africa and the Balkans and worked for newspapers in North Carolina and Ohio. He has worked in Syria, Libya, Afghanistan, Pakistan, India, Iraq, Russia, Bosnia, Lebanon, Israel, Gaza, Chechnya, and many countries in Africa, including South Sudan during the 2011 independence referendum.

In 2010, his photographs from the wars in Iraq and Afghanistan, along with the war correspondence of his colleagues Dexter Filkins and C.J. Chivers, with whom he often worked, were selected by New York University as being among the Top Ten Works of Journalism of the Decade.

Hicks was reported missing on March 16, 2011, while covering the revolution in Libya for The New York Times. The New York Times reported on March 18, 2011 that Libya had agreed to free Hicks, Anthony Shadid, Lynsey Addario and Stephen Farrell. Hicks and his three colleagues were released on March 21, 2011, six days after being captured by pro-Gaddafi forces.

He returned to Boston University in 2011 to deliver the commencement address at the College of Communication.

On February 16, 2012, Anthony Shadid suffered a fatal asthma attack while covering civil unrest in Syria with Hicks. Hicks assisted in carrying Shadid's body across the border into Turkey.

Hicks was present during the deadly Westgate shopping mall attack by terrorists in Nairobi on September 21, 2013. As injured victims tried to escape, Hicks entered the mall and followed Kenyan army and police as they searched for Al-Shabaab militants. For this work, he was awarded the 2014 Pulitzer Prize for Breaking News Photography as well as the Robert Capa Gold Medal. In 2016, he received another Pulitzer Prize for Breaking News Photography for his coverage of the European migrant crisis, sharing it with Mauricio Lima, Sergey Ponomarev, and Daniel Etter "for photographs that captured the resolve of refugees, the perils of their journeys and the struggle of host countries to take them in."

== Awards ==
- 2007: Newspaper Photographer of the Year, Pictures of the Year International, Missouri School of Journalism
- 2011: George Polk Award for Foreign Reporting
- 2014: Pulitzer Prize for Breaking News Photography for his coverage of the Westgate shopping mall attack
- 2014: Robert Capa Gold Medal, from the Overseas Press Club of America, for his coverage of the Westgate shopping mall attack
- 2016: Pulitzer Prize for Breaking News Photography, shared with Mauricio Lima, Sergey Ponomarev, and Daniel Etter for his coverage of the European migrant crisis
