= Douglas Fitzgerald Dowd =

American economist

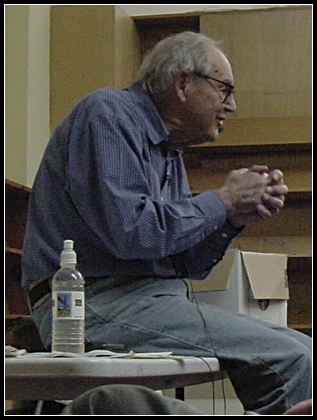

Personal details
- Born: December 7, 1919 San Francisco, California, U.S.
- Died: September 8, 2017 (aged 97) Bologna, Italy

Douglas Fitzgerald Dowd (December 7, 1919 – September 8, 2017) was an American political economist, economic historian and political activist.

== Academic career ==
From the late 1940s to the late 1990s, Dowd taught at Cornell University, the University of California, Berkeley and other universities. He has authored books that criticize capitalism in general, and US capitalism in particular.

He was awarded a Guggenheim Fellowship in the field of economic history for the academic year 1959–1960.

Many of his writings and audio transcripts are available on his website.

== Personal life ==
Dowd was the son of a Jewish mother and a Catholic father. The strong dislike for each side of the family for the other side led him during his youth to embrace an antireligious attitude.

Dowd claimed to be "non-religious" without saying if he was an agnostic or atheist.

== Politics ==
Dowd was one of the nominees of the Peace and Freedom Party for Vice President in the 1968 US presidential election. He agreed to be on the ticket in New York in order to prevent the selection of Jerry Rubin. The party's presidential candidate that year was Black Panther Eldridge Cleaver, who finished a distant fifth in the election.

During the protest-occupation of Willard Straight Hall at Cornell University on April 19, 1969, Dowd was sympathetic with the efforts of the Students for a Democratic Society (SDS), who organized continuous picketing that day in front of the Hall's main entrance, in support of the African-American protesters in the building. With Professor Dowd's encouragement, the picketing was replaced around midnight, with about 20 volunteers who circled the building in a quiet vigil until morning. Dowd recommended selecting the volunteers "for their ability to keep calm in a crisis situation."

Dowd was a sponsor of the War Tax Resistance project, which practiced and advocated tax resistance as a form of protest against the Vietnam War.

Dowd was the faculty sponsor of the West Tennessee Voters Project in Fayette County, Tennessee, that inspired a sizable number of Cornell students to become more active in civil rights work in the South one year after the gruesome murders of activists Andrew Goodman, Michael Schwerner and James Chaney in Philadelphia, Mississippi in 1964.

== Bibliography ==
- Step by step (1965)
- Modern Economic Problems in Historical Perspective (1965)
- Thorstein Veblen: A Critical Reappraisal; Lectures and Essays Commemorating the Hundredth Anniversary of Veblen's Birth (1965)
- America's role in the world economy:the challenge to orthodoxy (1966)
- The Twisted Dream: Capitalist Development in the United States Since 1776 (1974) ISBN 978-0-87626-881-0 2nd edition (1977)
- Waste of Nations: Dysfunction in the World Economy (1989) ISBN 978-0-8133-0810-4
- U.S. Capitalist Development Since 1776: Of, By, and for Which People? (1993)
- Blues for America: A Critique, a Lament, and Some Memories (1997) ISBN 978-0-85345-982-8
- Against the Conventional Wisdom: A Primer for Current Economics Controversies and Proposals (1997) ISBN 978-0-8133-2796-9
- Capitalism and Its Economics: A Critical History (2000) ISBN 978-0-7453-1643-7
- Understanding Capitalism: Critical Analysis from Karl Marx to Amartya Sen (2002) ISBN 978-0-7453-1782-3
- At the Cliffs Edge: World Problems and U.S. Power (Peninsula Peace and Justice Center, 2007)
- Inequality and the Global Economic Crisis (2009)

Preceded by —	Peace and Freedom nominee for Vice President of the United States; 1968	Succeeded by Julius Hobson (People's Party)
