= Joseph Schwantner: New Morning for the World; Nicolas Flagello: The Passion of Martin Luther King =

1995 album by the Oregon Symphony

Studio album by Oregon Symphony
- Released: January 16, 1995
- Recorded: September 1994
- Venue: Arlene Schnitzer Concert Hall, Portland, Oregon
- Genre: Classical
- Length: 58:54
- Label: Koch International Classics
- Producer: Michael Fine

Oregon Symphony chronology
| Roman Festivals (1993) | Joseph Schwantner: New Morning for the World; Nicolas Flagello: The Passion of Martin Luther King (1995) | Centennial Collection (1995) |

Joseph Schwantner: New Morning for the World; Nicolas Flagello: The Passion of Martin Luther King is a classical music album by the Oregon Symphony under the artistic direction of James DePreist, released by Koch International Classics in 1995. Recorded at the Arlene Schnitzer Concert Hall in Portland, Oregon, in September 1994, the album is a tribute to Martin Luther King Jr. and was released in his honor on the following holiday in his name.

The album features two works by American composers, each with text from speeches by King: Joseph Schwantner's New Morning for the World ("Daybreak of Freedom") and Nicolas Flagello's cantata The Passion of Martin Luther King. Both works include performances by Raymond Bazemore, who serves as narrator on the former and provides bass vocals on the latter. On the album's release date, more than 30 United States radio stations broadcast the album version of Schwantner's composition to commemorate the civil rights leader. Proceeds from the album's sale benefited the King Center for Nonviolent Social Change. Produced by Michael Fine and engineered by Fred Vogler, the recording reached a peak position of number three on Billboard's Classical Albums chart and remains the Oregon Symphony's best-selling album as of 2013.

== Composition ==
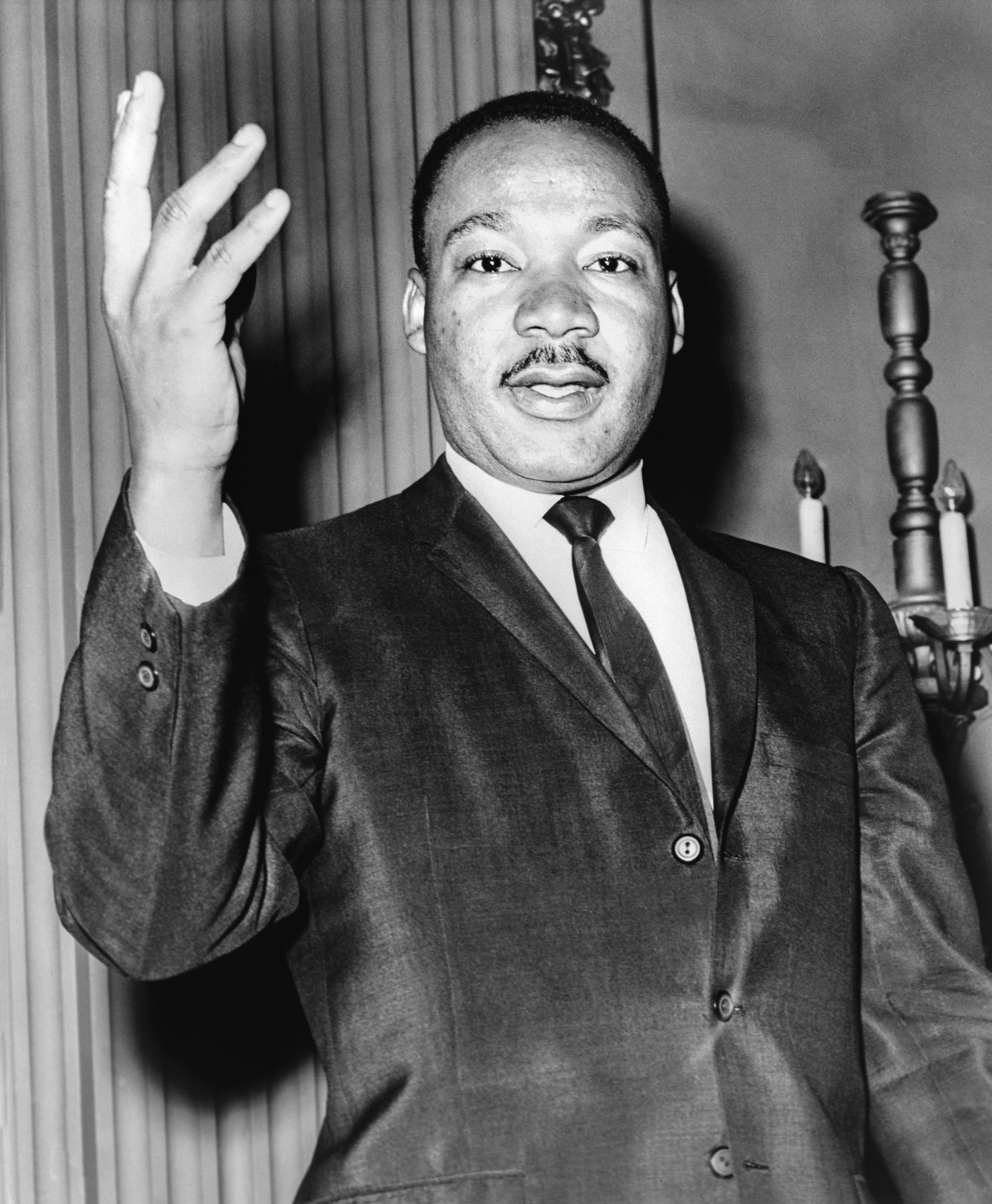
Works on the album feature text by Martin Luther King Jr. (pictured in 1964).

The album, 58 minutes and 54 seconds in length, contains two compositions: Joseph Schwantner's New Morning for the World ("Daybreak of Freedom") and Nicolas Flagello's cantata The Passion of Martin Luther King. Both compositions contain text from speeches by King delivered during the civil rights movement. The first track, 23 minutes and 27 seconds in length, features Schwantner's work. The Passion of Martin Luther King, 35 minutes and 17 seconds in length, is separated into nine tracks. The album was produced by Michael Fine and engineered by Fred Vogler. Coretta Scott King wrote the introduction for the album's liner notes.

New Morning for the World, composed in 1982 on commission from AT&T, premiered on January 15, 1983 (King's birthday) at the John F. Kennedy Center for the Performing Arts; David Effron conducted the Eastman Philharmonia, and Willie Stargell, then first baseman and team captain of the Pittsburgh Pirates, served as narrator. Schwantner selected words from public speeches by King that spanned more than a decade of his life. In the album's liner notes, program annotator and classical music radio host Jim Svejda described the work as having "equal parts" for the orchestra and the speaker, with King's words "supported and illuminated by an orchestra fabric of unusual variety and flexibility". Music critics compared Schwantner's composition to Aaron Copland's Lincoln Portrait because of its prominent narrative passages and its "broad and lyrical scoring that sounds unmistakably American". In describing the work, Melinda Bargreen of The Seattle Times wrote that percussion and "soaring" strings helped to emphasize King's orations. New Morning for the World contains text from the following speeches and writings by King: "Stride Toward Freedom" (1958), "Behind the Selma March" (1965), and "Letter from Birmingham Jail" (1963); the composition ends with King's "I Have a Dream" speech.

The Passion of Martin Luther King was composed in 1968 following King's assassination. The Passion was first recorded in London in 1969, with Ezio Flagello, the composer's brother, as the bass baritone soloist. This performance was eventually released by Naxos American Classics in 2012. DePreist conducted the National Symphony Orchestra's first performance of the work at the Kennedy Center on February 19, 1974. Music critics drew comparisons to Johann Sebastian Bach's Passions, which recounts Jesus' death. The Oregon Symphony album was the first published recording of the work. Bazemore provided bass vocals, with additional vocals by the Portland Symphonic Choir, directed by Bruce Browne. The nine sections of the work are performed with a brief pause in between.

== Reception ==
The album was released by Koch International Classics on January 16, 1995, Martin Luther King Day. On the same day, more than 30 United States radio stations broadcast the album's version of New Morning for the World to commemorate King. Martin Luther King III and Schwanter celebrated the album's release at Phipps Plaza in Atlanta. Proceeds from sales benefited the King Center for Nonviolent Social Change.

The album received positive commercial and critical reception. It reached a peak position of number three on Billboard's Classical Albums chart and remains the Oregon Symphony's best-selling album as of 2013. In his review for Deseret News, music critic William S. Goodfellow wrote that each work contained "sophistication and substance". Goodfellow said of Schwanter's composition: "The more exotic scoring... as well as Schwantner's minimalistic treatment of the music's more militant episodes, gives it a drive and dramatic punch of its own." The album features Raymond Bazemore as narrator; Goodfellow described Bazemore's "occasionally sing-song narration" in New Morning for the World as "Lincolnesque". He wrote that Flagello's work contained "writing of remarkable clarity and Italianate warmth", but thought Bazemore's voice sounded hoarse towards the end and preferred the solo sections in New Morning for the World. The Seattle Times's Melinda Bargreen called the album "strong and emotionally convincing", and praised "excellent performances with strong soloists". She wrote that both works were composed in "styles that are distinctively modern, but tonal and accessible". Bargreen described Bazemore's voice as "deeply affecting" and complimented DePreist for conducting "with an obvious passion for the music, drawing remarkably detailed and virtuosic performances from his orchestra." Tim Smith of the Sun-Sentinel said both works were "well worth hearing" and encouraged orchestras to explore the pieces, along with works by other African-American composers, to provide the public with broader programming. Smith described New Morning for the World as "remarkably lyrical" and "quite dramatic"; he found Bazemore's sing-song narration to be "too affected" but found the conclusion "touching" and complimented the orchestra for its overall "sturdy, communicative" performance. Smith called Flagello's score "unabashedly romantic" and described as effective the work of Bazemore, DePreist and the orchestra.

== Track listing ==
1. "New Morning for the World ("Daybreak of Freedom")" (Joseph Schwantner) – 23:27

The Passion of Martin Luther King (Nicolas Flagello)

2. "Hosanna filio David" – 3:27
3. "At the Center of Nonviolence" – 4:04
4. "Cor Jesu" – 3:53
5. "In the Struggle" – 5:25
6. "Et flagellis subditum" – 3:08
7. "Death is inevitable" – 3:48
8. "Stabat Mater" – 5:22
9. "We've Got Some Difficult Days Ahead" – 2:13
10. "Finale" – 3:48

Track listing adapted from Allmusic and the album's liner notes.

== Personnel ==
- Peter Alward – production assistant
- Raymond Bazemore – bass, narrator (track 1)
- Bruce Browne – director of the Portland Symphony Choir (tracks 2–10)
- James DePreist – conductor, primary artist
- Michael Fine – producer
- Tamra Saylor Fine – assistant producer
- Michael Johnson – production assistant
- Martin Luther King Jr. – lyricist
- Susan Napodano – production manager
- Oregon Symphony – ensemble
- Portland Symphonic Choir – choir/chorus
- Jim Svejda – liner notes
- Fred Vogler – engineer

Credits adapted from Allmusic.

=== Orchestra roster ===
- Clarisse Atcherson – violin
- Kenneth Baldwin – bass (assistant principal)
- Aida Baker – violin
- Warren Baker – trombone (principal) (tracks 2–10)
- Lajos Balogh – violin (second, principal)
- David Bamonte – trumpet*
- Joseph Berger – horn (associate principal)
- Bill Berman – viola*
- Ronald Blessinger – violin
- Naomi Blumberg – cello
- David Bryan – trombone (principal)* (track 1)
- Sigrid Clark – violin
- Julie Coleman – violin (second)
- John Cox – horn (principal)
- Jennifer Craig – harp (principal)
- Dolores D'Aigle – violin (second, assistant principal)
- Juan de Gomar – bassoon (track 1)
- Eileen Deiss – violin
- Niel DePonte – percussion (principal)
- Frank Diliberto – bass (principal)
- Jonathan Dubay – violin
- Greta Eder – violin
- Cheri Ann Egbers – clarinet, librarian
- Jack Elmore – trombone
- Mark Eubanks – bassoon (principal)
- Hugh Ewert – associate concertmaster, violin
- Matthew Faust – violin (second)
- Kenneth Finch – cello
- Lynne Eisert Finch – violin (second)**
- Marian Fox – viola
- Michael Foxman – concertmaster, violin
- Leah Frajola – violin (second)
- Peter Frajola – assistant concertmaster, violin
- Javier Gandara – horn (assistant principal)
- Katherine George – keyboard (principal) (track 1)
- Mary Grant – horn
- Kathryn Gray – violin
- Martha Herby – flute
- Gyrid Hyde-Towle – violin (second)
- Ginger Iles – violin (second)
- India Jobelmann – cello (principal)
- Jeffrey Johnson – bass
- Eugene Kaza – violin (second)*
- Mary Ann Coggins Kaza – orchestra personnel manager, violin
- Frederick Korman – oboe (principal)
- Sally Nelson Kuhns – trumpet (assistant principal)
- Todd Kuhns – clarinet, E-flat clarinet/bass clarinet (track 1)
- Eileen Lande – violin (second)
- Harold Lawrence – cello
- Steve Lawrence – percussion
- Anne Leeder-Beesley – violin (second)
- Tristan Lehnert – violin
- Judith Litt – oboe
- Jerome Magill – bass
- Marlene Majovski – violin
- Richard Mansfield – bass
- Michelle Mathewson – viola* (track 1)
- Phillip Murthe – bass
- Audrey May – viola
- Stephanie McDougal – cello
- Patricia Miller – viola (assistant principal)*
- Robert Naglee – bassoon
- Yoshinori Nakao – clarinet (principal)
- Catherine Noll – violin (second)
- William Ofstad – bass
- Gayle Budd O'Grady – cello
- Harris Orem – English horn (track 1)
- Barton Parker – horn
- Christine Perry – percussion
- Jeff Peyton – percussion* (track 1)
- Alan Pierce – bass trombone
- Deloris Plum – cello
- Stephen Price – viola
- John Richards – librarian, tuba (principal)
- Georgeanne Ries – flute* (track 1), piccolo* (track 1)
- Paul Salvatore – timpani (principal)
- Fred Sautter – trumpet (principal)
- Anna Schaum – viola
- Timothy Scott – cello
- Michael Sigell – violin (second)
- Deborah Singer – violin
- Bridget Socolofsky – cello
- David Socolofsky – cello (assistant principal)
- Tomáš Svoboda – keyboard*, organ (tracks 2–10), piano (track 1)
- Peggy Swafford – viola
- Tommy Thompson – bass
- Randall Vemer – viola (principal)**
- Martha Warrington – viola (principal)*
- Dawn Weiss – flute (principal)
- Connie Whelan – viola
- Leo Whitlow – viola*
- Ron Williams – violin
- Carla Wilson – flute (track 1), piccolo

Orchestra roster adapted from the album's liner notes.

"*" designates acting orchestra members; "**" designates musicians on a leave of absence.

== See also ==
- Civil rights movement in popular culture
