= Cheryl Diaz Meyer =

Independent photojournalist

- Born: February 25, 1968 (age 58); Quezon City, Philippines
- Occupation: Photographer
- Website: http://www.cheryldiazmeyer.com/

Cheryl Diaz Meyer is an independent photojournalist based in Washington, D.C., who won the Pulitzer Prize for Breaking News Photography with David Leeson in 2004.

== Biography and career ==
Cheryl Diaz Meyer was born on February 25, 1968, in Quezon City, Philippines and moved to the United States at the age of thirteen. She attended University of Minnesota-Duluth, where she graduated cum laude with a Bachelor of Arts in German. Diaz Meyer then attended Western Kentucky University where she received a Bachelor of Arts in Photojournalism. In 1993 Diaz Meyer started off her career as a photo intern at The Washington Post. A year later in 1994 she became a staff photographer for The Minneapolis Star Tribune where she would work for five years before moving to work for The Dallas Morning News. Recognized for her work in war zones, Diaz Meyer wrote about her experiences for the Nieman Reports in 2006.

Diaz Meyer worked as the visual editor at the McClatchy Washington Bureau based in Washington, D.C., from 2014 to 2017. She has worked as an independent photographer based in Washington, D.C., since 2017.

== Awards ==
In 2004, Diaz Meyer was awarded the Pulitzer Prize for Breaking News Photography with David Leeson for their photographs of the war with Iraq. Diaz Meyer was given the Visa d’Or Daily Press Award in 2003 for her coverage of the war in Iraq. She was also awarded the John Faber Award from the Overseas Press Club in 2001 for her portfolio covering the war in Afghanistan immediately after 9/11.

In 2018, Diaz Meyer won the first, second, and third place prizes, as well as both Awards of Excellence in the International News Category of the Eyes of History : Still Contest, from the White House News Photographers Association. She won for her work documenting the struggles of Rohingya refugees in Bangladesh.
