= Ronald A. Edmonds =

American photojournalist (1946–2024)

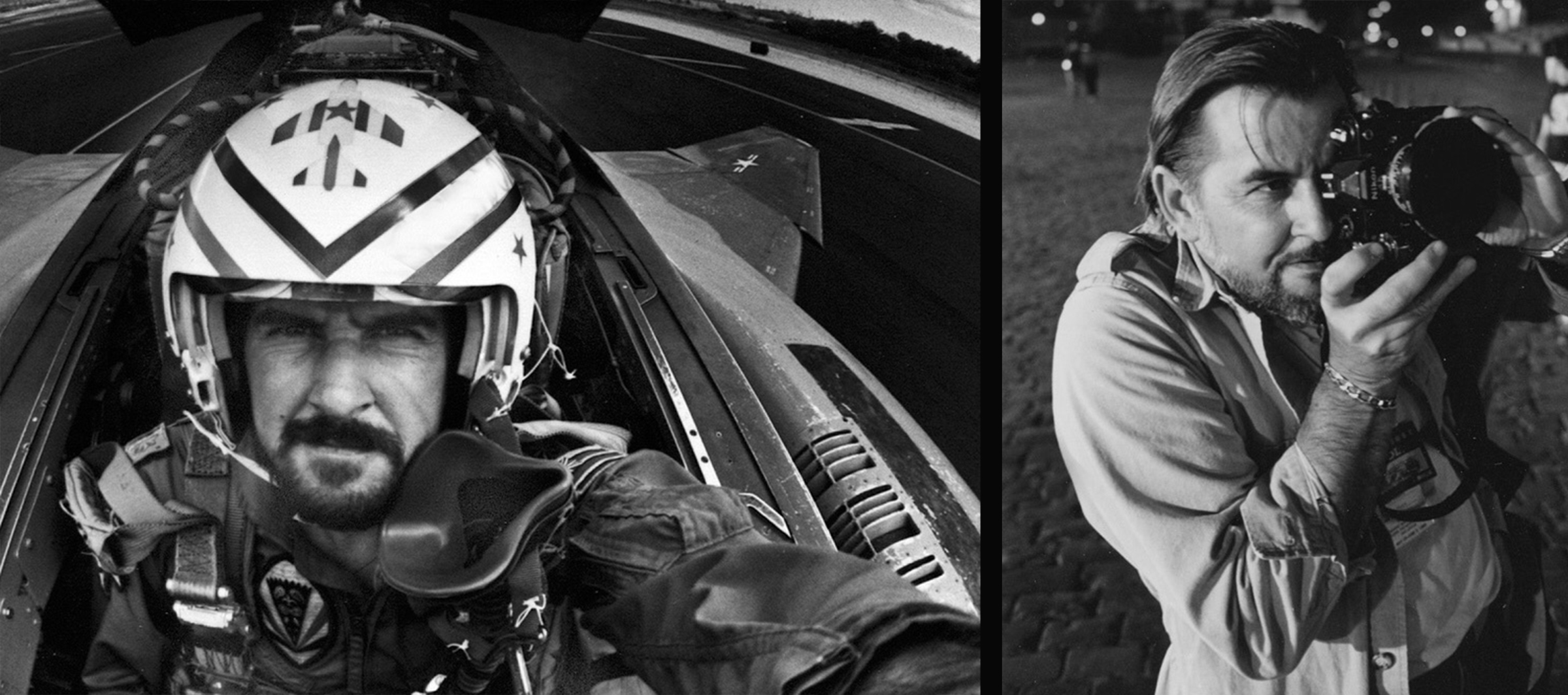
- Born: June 16, 1946; Richmond, California, U.S.
- Died: May 31, 2024 (aged 77); Falls Church, Virginia, U.S.
- Occupation: Photojournalist
- Known for: Coverage of the attempted assassination of Ronald Reagan

Ronald Allen Edmonds (June 16, 1946 – May 31, 2024) was an American photojournalist who won the 1982 Pulitzer Prize in Spot News Photography for his coverage of the assassination attempt on President Ronald Reagan's life.

== Biography ==
Edmonds was born in Richmond, California, on June 16, 1946. He photographed every United States President from Richard Nixon through President Barack Obama. His assignments included covering summits of world leaders, Presidential inaugurations, Space Shuttle launches, Super Bowls, Summer and Winter Olympics, political races, and most of the Republican and Democratic National Conventions since 1980. His work has appeared in publications around the world including Time, Newsweek, Paris Match, Stern, Sports Illustrated, Life, and People.

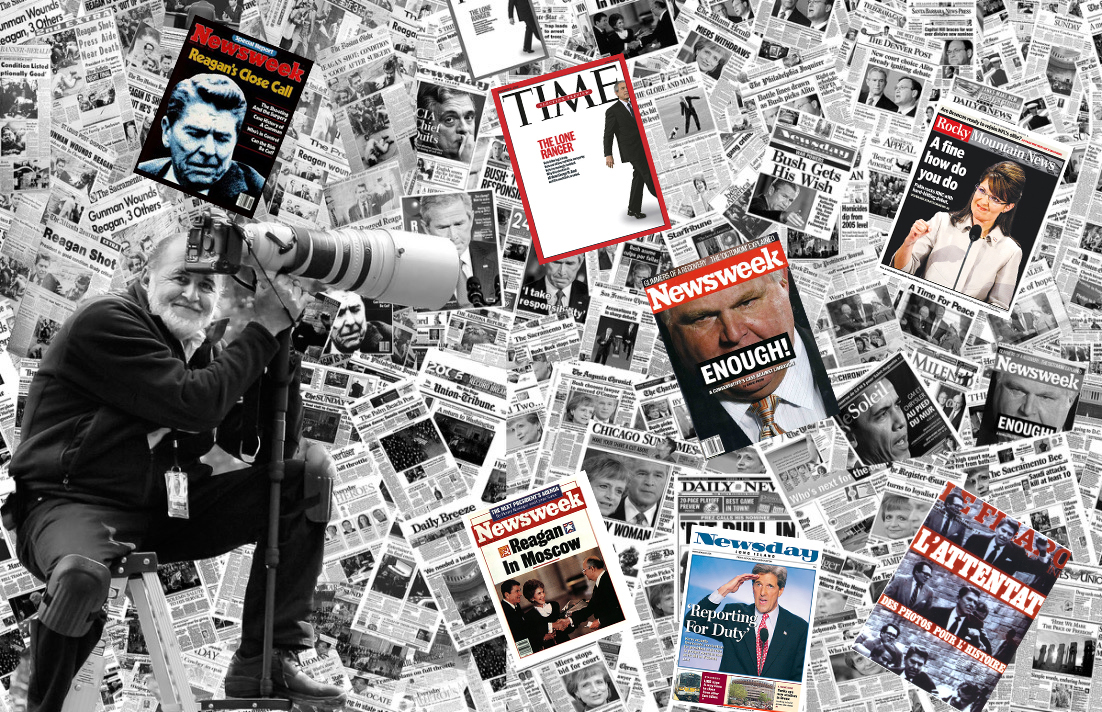
Just some of the covers of magazines and newspapers Ron Edmonds shot during his career.

He began his first staff photographer job at the Honolulu Star-Bulletin, in Honolulu, Hawaii in 1972. After five years he was promoted to Chief Photographer and traveled throughout the Pacific including American Samoa, the Hawaiian Islands, Midway Island, and Wake Island, covering assignments that included Emperor Hirohito's visit, Elvis Presley's world-wide televised concert, and the return of POW's from Vietnam through Wake Island.

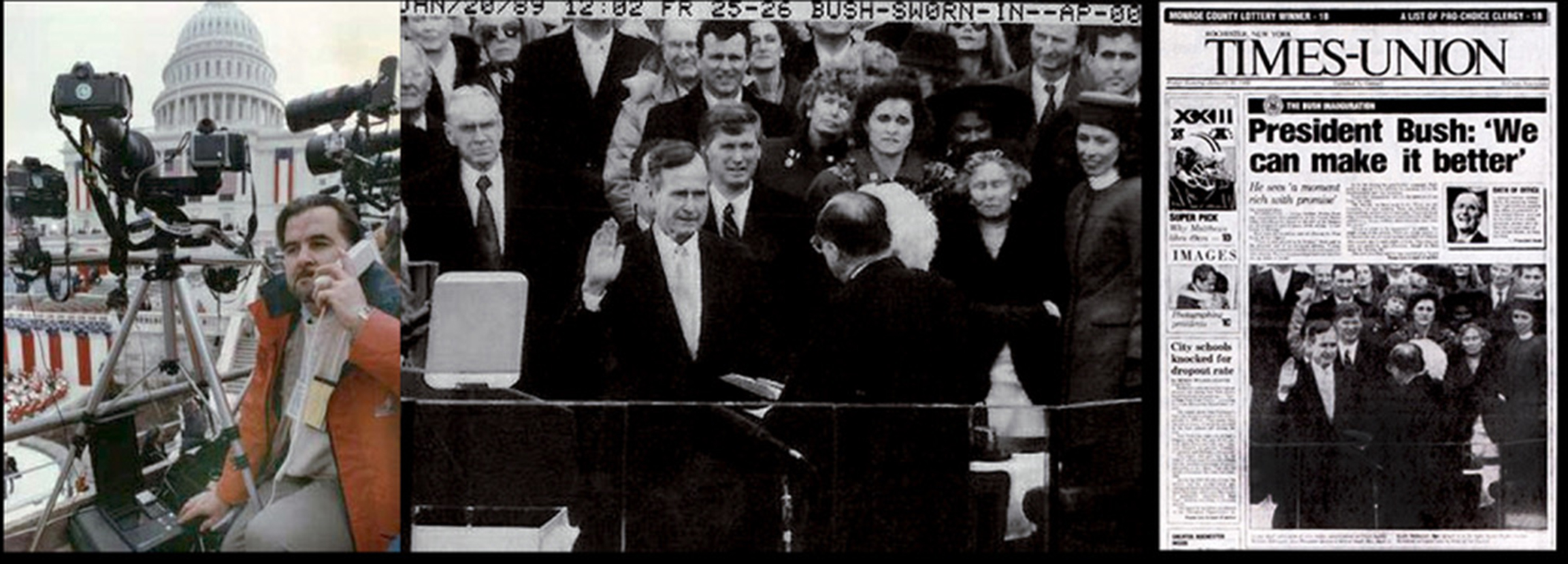
The first use of electronic still image.

Edmonds joined United Press International in 1978 as Newspicture Bureau Manager in Sacramento, California. His assignments for UPI included the Winter Olympics, NBA playoffs, NCAA basketball finals, and Presidential campaigns including Ronald Reagan's presidential campaign and inauguration in 1980.

Edmonds joined the Associated Press in Washington in 1981 and worked there until 2009, when he retired as the AP's Senior White House Photographer. He was one of the early pioneers of the use of digital cameras in news photography, including using an experimental electronic camera to transmit to newspapers around the world the first photos of President George H. W. Bush's inauguration, forty seconds after he put his hand down after being sworn in.

Edmonds died in Falls Church, Virginia, on May 31, 2024, at the age of 77 due to pneumonia from a bacterial infection.

== Awards ==
In 1981 Edmonds was awarded the Pulitzer Prize in spot news photography for his coverage of the assassination attempt on President Ronald Reagan's life on March 30, 1981.

- Associated Press Managing Editors Award
- Grand Diploma from the World Press Awards
- Golden Eye Award, The World Press Association
- Distinguished Service Award, Society of Professional Journalists
- National Headliners Award for Spot News Photography
- Awards from the White House News Photographers Association and the National Press Photographers Association
