= David Leeson =

American journalist (1957–2022)

- Leeson in Iraq in 2003
- Born: October 18, 1957; Abilene, Texas, U.S.
- Died: April 16, 2022 (aged 64); Abilene, Texas, U.S.
- Education: Abilene Christian University
- Spouse: Kim Ritzenthaler (m. 2000; div. 2020)
- Children: 5

David Leeson (October 18, 1957 – April 16, 2022) was a staff photographer for The Dallas Morning News. He won the Pulitzer Prize for Breaking News Photography in 2004, together with Cheryl Diaz Meyer, for coverage of the Iraq War. He also received the RTNDA Edward R. Murrow Award, the National Headliner Award, and a regional Emmy Award in 2004 for his work as executive producer and photographer for the WFAA-TV documentary "War Stories."

Before his 2004 win, Leeson had been a finalist for the Pulitzer three times — twice individually and once as member of a team — in feature photography (1986), explanatory journalism (1990, as part of the newspaper staff), and spot news photography (1995).

== Photojournalism career ==
Leeson was a 1978 graduate of Abilene Christian University, where he received a degree in journalism and mass communication. While still in college, he was on the staff of the Abilene Reporter-News, where he began in 1977 and stayed until 1982. He left Abilene for New Orleans, Louisiana, where he was on the staff of The Times-Picayune from 1982 to 1984.

Since joining the staff of The Dallas Morning News in 1984, Leeson has covered local and regional news and issues, such as homelessness and natural disasters; national stories on death row inmates across the United States; international conflicts in El Salvador, Nicaragua, Panama, Peru, Sudan, Angola, Kuwait and Iraq in the first and second Gulf Wars; earthquakes in Turkey; and apartheid in South Africa. His 1985 series on homelessness earned him a Robert F. Kennedy Journalism Award, an honor he received again in 1994 for his coverage of the civil war in Angola. The year 1985 also saw his first Pulitzer nomination, for coverage of apartheid in South Africa; he returned twice to that nation, the last time in 1994, when he recorded the historic event of South Africa's first non-racial presidential elections.

While photographing protesters during the buildup to the ousting of Manuel Noriega in 1988, Leeson was wounded when a shotgun pellet entered his cheek, chipping his tooth and sending him to a Panama City emergency room.

Leeson was a finalist for the Pulitzer a second time, in 1994, for a photograph of a family fleeing floodwaters in southeast Texas, a picture that also won him a Texas Headliner Award.

In 2008, Leeson decided to accept a buy-out offer and leave The Dallas Morning News, as part of an A. H. Belo Corporation cost-cutting measure involving buyouts of more than 400 journalists. He planned to continue in freelance photojournalism and documentary film work.

=== Unattributed photos ===
While Leeson's work is well known within the journalism community, he has endured a number of cases of credit for his Iraq photos being given to others, following his loaning of a CD of 200 full-resolution photos to the U.S. Army 3rd Infantry Division for one-time use in a yearbook for the soldiers. He has written about the incident in a public blog, stating that although he included copyright symbols with each photo, placed a README file on the CD explaining that the images were for one-time use, and explained to the public affairs officer that the images should be guarded closely to prevent plagiarism, someone made several copies and distributed them. In many cases, the soldiers appear to have been unaware that Leeson never intended for copies to be made of the CD, as more than one has written to him asking for a replacement copy after losing their disc.

Subsequently, numerous incidents have occurred in which soldiers, photographers, or others have passed off Leeson's work as their own, either on photography sites, blogs, or print periodicals.

== Personal life ==
Leeson was born October 18, 1957, in Abilene, Texas, and died there April 16, 2022. He was most recently married to former Dallas Morning News photographer Kim Ritzenthaler (on April 17, 2000), with whom he had two children. He also had three children from a previous marriage, which ended in 1998.
