= Annie Wells (photographer) =

American photographer

Annie Wells (born March 24, 1954) is an American photographer, winner of a Pulitzer Prize for Spot News Photography.

== Early life and education ==
Annie Wells was born on March 24, 1954.

She graduated from University of California, Santa Cruz with a B.A. in 1981, and studied photojournalism at San Francisco State University where she was part of a group that won the RFK public service award.

== Career ==
Wells worked as a photographer for the Santa Rosa Press Democrat, San Francisco bureau Associated Press, the Greeley Tribune in Greeley, Colorado, and the Herald Journal in Logan, Utah.

She joined the Los Angeles Times in 1997. In October 2008, she was laid off from the Los Angeles Times.

== Recognition and awards ==
- 1997: Pulitzer Prize for Spot News Photography

== Personal life ==
Wells is a survivor of breast cancer.
