= The Mercury (Pennsylvania) =

Newspaper in Pottstown, Pennsylvania

- Type: Daily newspaper
- Format: Broadsheet
- Owner: MediaNews Group
- Publisher: Edward S. Condra
- Editor: Tony Phyrillas, Diane Hoffman (online)
- Founded: 1931
- Language: English
- Headquarters: Exton, Pennsylvania
- City: Pottstown, Pennsylvania
- Circulation: 27,500
- Website: pottsmerc.com

The Mercury is a daily newspaper published in Pottstown, Pennsylvania.

== Awards ==
The Mercury is the smallest circulation newspaper in the U.S. to have its staffers win two Pulitzer Prizes. In 1979, staff photographer Thomas J. Kelly III won in the Spot News Photography category. In 1990, staff Tom Hylton won in the Editorial Writing category. The Mercury has won hundreds of other state and national awards in the past 89 years.

== Campaigns ==
Some of its investigative work has led to changes in state and federal laws. In its most recent public service campaign, The Mercury led the battle to overturn a middle-of-the-night pay raise that Pennsylvania lawmakers voted themselves in July 2005. The newspaper published a series of editorials by editor Nancy March and op-ed columns by City Editor Tony Phyrillas demanding the repeal of the pay raise. The newspaper also collected 10,000 letters from readers demanding repeal of the pay raise and delivered them to the state Capitol in Harrisburg. One month after the letters were delivered, the legislature voted to repeal the pay raise. The Mercury celebrated its 75th anniversary in 2006 and continues as a crusading small-town newspaper. The Mercury covers parts of Montgomery, Chester and Berks counties in southeastern Pennsylvania. The Mercury won seven awards in the 2007 editorial excellence contest sponsored by Suburban Newspapers of America. Located at the corner of Hanover and King streets in Pottstown, The Mercury has a daily circulation of 27,500 and also posts stories at its Web site. The Mercury is owned by the MediaNews Group, formerly Journal Register Company, one of the largest newspaper chains in the country.
