= Pulitzer Prize for Breaking News Photography =

American photojournalism award

The Pulitzer Prize for Breaking News Photography is one of the American Pulitzer Prizes annually awarded for journalism. From 2000 it has used the "breaking news" name but it is considered a continuation of the Pulitzer Prize for Spot News Photography, which was awarded from 1968 to 1999. Prior to 1968, a single Prize was awarded for photojournalism, the Pulitzer Prize for Photography, which was replaced in that year by Pulitzer Prize for Spot News Photography and Pulitzer Prize for Feature Photography.

== List of winners for Pulitzer Prize for Spot News Photography ==
- 1968: Rocco Morabito, Jacksonville Journal, for his photograph of telephone linemen, "The Kiss of Life".
- 1969: Edward T. Adams, Associated Press, for his photograph, "Saigon Execution".
- 1970: Steve Starr, Associated Press, for his news photo taken at Cornell University, "Campus Guns".
- 1971: John Paul Filo, Valley Daily News/Daily Dispatch, of the Pittsburgh suburbs of Tarentum and New Kensington, for his pictorial coverage of the Kent State University tragedy on May 4, 1970.
- 1972: Horst Faas and Michel Laurent, Associated Press, for their picture series, "Death in Dacca".
- 1973: Huynh Cong Ut, Associated Press, for his photograph, The Terror of War (or Napalm Girl), depicting children in flight from a napalm bombing.
- 1974: Anthony K. Roberts, a freelance photographer of Beverly Hills, California, for his picture series, "Fatal Hollywood Drama", in which an alleged kidnapper was killed.
- 1975: Gerald H. Gay, Seattle Times, for his photograph of four exhausted firefighters (l to r: Joe Guild, Tom Gudmestad, Chris Kitterman and Jim Flick), "Lull in the Battle".
- 1976: Stanley Forman, Boston Herald-American, for his sequence of photographs of a fire in Boston, including "Fire Escape Collapse", on July 22, 1975.
- 1977: Stanley Forman, Boston Herald-American, for his photograph The Soiling of Old Glory, which depicts Joseph Rakes attacking Theodore Landsmark — using an American flag as a lance — during a desegregation busing demonstration at Boston City Hall.
- 1977: Neal Ulevich, of the Associated Press, for a series of photographs of disorder and brutality in the streets of Bangkok.
- 1978: John Blair, special assignment photographer for United Press International, for a photograph of a broker held hostage at gunpoint by Tony Kiritsis.
- 1979: Thomas J. Kelly III, Pottstown Mercury, Pennsylvania, for a series called "Tragedy on Sanatoga Road". It is of a man, Richard G., who was holding his wife and daughter hostage as he was running from the police.
- 1980: Anonymous, Ettela'at, United Press International, for "Firing Squad in Iran". In 2006, the photographer's identity was revealed to be Jahangir Razmi.
- 1981: Larry C. Price, Fort Worth Star-Telegram, for his photographs from Liberia.
- 1982: Ron Edmonds, Associated Press, for his coverage of the Reagan assassination attempt.
- 1983: Bill Foley, Associated Press, for his series of pictures of victims and survivors of the massacre in the Sabra Camp in Beirut.
- 1984: Stan Grossfeld, Boston Globe, for his series of photographs which reveal the effects of war on the people of Lebanon.
- 1985: Photography staff, Register, Santa Ana, California, for their coverage of the Olympic Games.
- 1986: Carol Guzy and Michel du Cille, Miami Herald, for their photographs of the devastation caused by the eruption of the Nevado del Ruiz volcano in Colombia.
- 1987: Kim Komenich, San Francisco Examiner, for his photographic coverage of the fall of Ferdinand Marcos.
- 1988: Scott Shaw, Odessa American, for his photograph of the child Jessica McClure being rescued from the well into which she had fallen.
- 1989: Ron Olshwanger, a freelance photographer, for a picture published in the St. Louis Post-Dispatch of a firefighter giving mouth-to-mouth resuscitation to a child pulled from a burning building.
- 1990: Photo staff of the Oakland Tribune, California, for their photographs of devastation caused by the Loma Prieta earthquake of October 17, 1989. The Oakland Tribune team consisted of Tom Duncan, Angela Pancrazio, Pat Greenhouse, Reginald Pearman, Matthew Lee, Gary Reyes, Michael Macor, Ron Riesterer, Paul Miller, Roy H. Williams.
- 1991: Greg Marinovich, Associated Press, for a series of photographs of supporters of South Africa's African National Congress murdering a man they believed to be a Zulu spy.
- 1992: Staff, Associated Press, for photographs of the attempted coup in Russia and the subsequent collapse of the Communist regime.
- 1993: Ken Geiger and William Snyder, Dallas Morning News, for their photographs of the 1992 Summer Olympics in Barcelona.
- 1994: Paul Watson, Toronto Star, for his photograph, published around the world, of a U.S. soldier's body being dragged by Somalis through the streets of Mogadishu.
- 1995: Carol Guzy, Washington Post, for her series of photographs illustrating the crisis in Haiti and its aftermath.
- 1996: Charles Porter IV, a freelancer, for his photographs taken after the Oklahoma City bombing and distributed by the Associated Press, showing a one-year-old victim (Baylee Almon) handed to and then cradled by a fireman.
- 1997: Annie Wells, Press Democrat, Santa Rosa, California, for her photograph of a firefighter rescuing a teenager from raging floodwaters.
- 1998: Martha Rial, Pittsburgh Post-Gazette, for her portraits of survivors of the conflicts in Rwanda and Burundi.
- 1999: Staff, Associated Press, for its portfolio of images following the embassy bombing in Kenya and Tanzania.

== List of winners for Pulitzer Prize for Breaking News Photography ==
Year	Names(s)	Publication	Rationale	Work
2000	Staff	Rocky Mountain News	"for its photographic coverage of students following the shooting at Columbine High School near Denver."	images
2001	Alan Diaz	Associated Press	"for his photograph of federal agents removing Elián González from his uncle's home."	image
2002	Staff	The New York Times	"for its coverage of the September 11 attack on the World Trade Center."	images
2003	Staff	Rocky Mountain News	"for its powerful, imaginative coverage of Colorado's raging forest fires."	images
2004	Cheryl Diaz Meyer	The Dallas Morning News	"for their eloquent photographs depicting both the violence and poignancy of the war in Iraq."	images
2004	David Leeson	The Dallas Morning News	"for their eloquent photographs depicting both the violence and poignancy of the war in Iraq."	images
2005	Staff	Associated Press	"for its stunning series of photographs of bloody yearlong combat inside Iraqi cities."	images
2006	Staff	The Dallas Morning News	"for its vivid photographs depicting the chaos and pain after Hurricane Katrina engulfed New Orleans."	images
2007	Oded Balilty	Associated Press	"for his powerful photograph of a lone Jewish woman defying Israeli security forces as they remove illegal settlers in the West Bank."	image
2008	Adrees Latif	Reuters	"for his dramatic photograph of a Japanese videographer, sprawled on the pavement, fatally wounded during a street demonstration in Myanmar."	image
2009	Patrick Farrell	Miami Herald	"for his provocative, impeccably composed images of despair after Hurricane Ike and other lethal storms caused a humanitarian disaster in Haiti."	image
2010	Mary Chind	The Des Moines Register	"for her photograph of the heart-stopping moment when a rescuer dangling in a makeshift harness tries to save a woman trapped in the foaming water beneath a dam."	image
2011	Ricky Carioti	The Washington Post	"for their up-close portrait of grief and desperation after a catastrophic earthquake struck Haiti."	images
2011	Carol Guzy	The Washington Post	"for their up-close portrait of grief and desperation after a catastrophic earthquake struck Haiti."	images
2011	Nikki Kahn	The Washington Post	"for their up-close portrait of grief and desperation after a catastrophic earthquake struck Haiti."	images
2012	Massoud Hossaini	Agence France-Presse	"for his heartbreaking image of a girl crying in fear after a suicide bomber's attack at a crowded shrine in Kabul."	images
2013	Rodrigo Abd	Associated Press	"for their compelling coverage of the civil war in Syria."	images
2013	Manu Brabo	Associated Press	"for their compelling coverage of the civil war in Syria."	images
2013	Narciso Contreras	Associated Press	"for their compelling coverage of the civil war in Syria."	images
2013	Khalil Hamra	Associated Press	"for their compelling coverage of the civil war in Syria."	images
2013	Muhammed Muheisen	Associated Press	"for their compelling coverage of the civil war in Syria."	images
2014	Tyler Hicks	The New York Times	"for courageously documenting a deadly terrorist attack at a Nairobi shopping mall."	images
2015	Staff	St. Louis Post-Dispatch	"for powerful images of the despair and anger in Ferguson, Missouri, stunning photojournalism that served the community while informing the country."	images
2016	Daniel Etter	The New York Times	"for photographs that captured the resolve of refugees, the perils of their journeys and the struggle of host countries to take them in."	images
2016	Tyler Hicks	The New York Times	"for photographs that captured the resolve of refugees, the perils of their journeys and the struggle of host countries to take them in."	images
2016	Mauricio Lima	The New York Times	"for photographs that captured the resolve of refugees, the perils of their journeys and the struggle of host countries to take them in."	images
2016	Sergey Ponomarev	The New York Times	"for photographs that captured the resolve of refugees, the perils of their journeys and the struggle of host countries to take them in."	images
2016	Staff	Reuters	"for gripping photographs, each with its own voice, that follow migrant refugees hundreds of miles across uncertain boundaries to unknown destinations."	images
2017	Daniel Berehulak	The New York Times	"for powerful storytelling through images published in The New York Times showing the callous disregard for human life in the Philippines brought about by a government assault on drug dealers and users."	images
2018	Ryan Kelly	The Daily Progress	"for a chilling image that reflected the photographer's reflexes and concentration in capturing the moment of impact of a car attack during a racially charged protest in Charlottesville, Va."	images
2019	Staff	Reuters	"for a vivid and startling visual narrative of the urgency, desperation and sadness of migrants as they journeyed to the U.S. from Central and South America."	images
2020	Staff	Reuters	"for wide-ranging and illuminating photographs of Hong Kong as citizens protested infringement of their civil liberties and defended the region's autonomy by the Chinese government."	images
2021	Staff	Associated Press	"for a collection of photographs from multiple U.S. cities that cohesively captures the country's response to the death of George Floyd."	images
2022	Drew Angerer	Getty Images	"for comprehensive and consistently riveting photos of the attack on the U.S. Capitol."	images
2022	Jon Cherry	Getty Images	"for comprehensive and consistently riveting photos of the attack on the U.S. Capitol."	images
2022	Samuel Corum	Getty Images	"for comprehensive and consistently riveting photos of the attack on the U.S. Capitol."	images
2022	Win McNamee	Getty Images	"for comprehensive and consistently riveting photos of the attack on the U.S. Capitol."	images
2022	Spencer Platt	Getty Images	"for comprehensive and consistently riveting photos of the attack on the U.S. Capitol."	images
2022	Marcus Yam	Los Angeles Times	"for raw and urgent images of the U.S. departure from Afghanistan that capture the human cost of the historic change in the country."	images
2023	Staff	Associated Press	"In recognition of 15 searing images that rendered in real-time the devastating human toll of the war in Ukraine".	images
2024	Staff	Reuters	"for raw and urgent photographs documenting the October 7th deadly attack in Israel by Hamas and the first weeks of Israel's devastating assault on Gaza."	images
2025	Doug Mills	The New York Times	"for a sequence of photos of the attempted assassination of then-presidential candidate Donald Trump, including one image that captures a bullet whizzing through the air as he speaks."	images
2026	Saher Alghorra	The New York Times	"for his haunting, sensitive series showing the devastation and starvation in Gaza resulting from the war with Israel."	images

== See also ==
- List of American journalism awards
- World Press Photo of the Year
- List of photographs considered the most important
