= Thomas J. Kelly III =

American journalist

- Born: August 8, 1947 (age 78); Hackensack, New Jersey
- Title: Freelance Journalist
- Spouse: Patricia Lee Moulder
- Children: Four children
- Awards: 1979 Pulitzer Prize Winner

Thomas J. Kelly III (August 8, 1947), born in Hackensack, New Jersey, is an American, Pulitzer prize-winning photojournalist. Based in greater Philadelphia, he has worked as a freelancer for electronic and print outlets since 1995. Kelly joined the staff of The Mercury in Pottstown, Pennsylvania in 1974, where he won the 1979 Pulitzer prize for spot news photography; he left The Mercury in 1989.

== Career ==
Kelly worked in a variety of jobs, as a salesman, draftsman and as a volunteer firefighter. He began his career in journalism, in 1969, as a part-time staff member with the Norristown Montgomery Post, working with the organization until 1971. Kelly left the Post and began working as a photographer for a Valley Forge newspaper, Today's Post, in Pennsylvania, until leaving in 1974, to work with the Pottstown Mercury, as their Photography Supervisor. He later became the Chief Photographer, and then continued as a freelance photojournalist.

In the spring of 1978, Kelly caught a call coming over the police scanner that the Goodwill Ambulance needed assistance in East Coventry County where "someone was stabbing everybody." Kelly arrived at the scene of what would become an hour-long standoff, between the police and Richard Greist. Finally, police made the decision to storm the residence in an effort to save the family members. Kelly took multiple rolls of film during the incident, including the instant that Chief Detective Douglas Weaver rushed in to grab six year old Beth Ann Greist, bloody from multiple stab wounds, the young girl in one arm and his shotgun in the other hand; at one point, Greist broke free from the custody of the officers and charged Kelly, who would later say he didn't even realize that he had taken a photo of the incident because it happened so suddenly.

Eleven of Kelly's photographs were published by the Mercury the next morning and in 1979 he won the annual Pulitzer Prize for Spot News Photography, for those series of photographs. In the book, Press Photography Award 1942-1998, the jurors on the prize committee are quoted as saying, in choosing Kelly as the first place winner, that '"Kelly's pictures vividly illustrate pictorial judgement under extreme pressure. The photographer's intuitive sense captured virtually every significant moment of a highly-dangerous, quick moving event...The pictures were taken at considerable personal risk and represent more than merely being at the right place at the right time."'

The series of photos, titled "Tragedy on Sanatoga Road," were featured in a TNT documentary, "Moment of Impact: Stories of the Pulitzer Prize Photographs," and have been included in multiple exhibitions around the country.

Kelly worked as the Director of Photography for The Trentonian in New Jersey in 1990, leaving in 1996 to pursue freelance photojournalism.

== Awards and recognition ==
In addition to his 1979 Pulitzer Prize, Kelly was named as Newspaper Photographer of the year (region III) in 1975, 1976, and 1979, by the National Press Photographers Association. In 1976 he was chosen as Pennsylvania Photographer of the year, and in 1980, Kelly was the recipient of the Robert F. Kennedy journalism award.

== Personal ==
Kelly was born to parents Thomas J. and Severina (Augenti) Kelly, on August 8, 1947. He was married in 1975, to Patricia Lee Moulder, and they have four children, Danielle, Devon, Thomas IV, and Taylor.

As recently as 2020, Kelly has filed lawsuits for copyright infringement of his photographs, including against Morgan and Morgan, a nationwide law firm.
