= Joseph Schwantner =

American modern classical composer

- Born: March 22, 1943 (age 83); Chicago, Illinois
- Occupation: Modern classical composer
- Notable work: Aftertones of Infinity
- Awards: Pulitzer Prize for Music (1979); Joseph H. Bearns Prize
- Website: Official site

Joseph Clyde Schwantner (born March 22, 1943) is an American composer, educator and a member of the American Academy of Arts and Letters since 2002. He was awarded the 1970 Charles Ives Prize.

Schwantner is prolific, with many works to his credit. His style is coloristic and eclectic, drawing on diverse elements including French impressionism, African drumming, and minimalism. His orchestral work Aftertones of Infinity received the 1979 Pulitzer Prize for Music.

== Biographical information ==
Schwantner began his musical study at an early age in classical guitar; this study also incorporated the genres of jazz and folk. He also played the tuba in his high school orchestra. His first compositional aspirations were noticed by his guitar teacher who consistently experienced Schwantner elaborating on pieces he would be studying. From this, Schwantner's teacher suggested he collect these ideas and create his own musical composition. One of his earliest compositions was in the jazz idiom. The piece Offbeats won the National Band Camp Award in 1959.

Remaining in Chicago, he continued his musical study in composition at the city's American Conservatory, where he graduated with a bachelor's degree in 1964. Here, Schwantner studied with Bernard Dieter. He was exposed to and closely explored the music of Debussy, Bartók, and Messiaen. His graduate study also occurred in Chicago, obtaining master of music and doctorate of music degrees in composition from Northwestern University in 1966 and 1968 respectively. At Northwestern, he was guided under the tutelage of Alan Stout and Anthony Donato. Building on his experiences at the American Conservatory, Schwantner was engaged by the music of Berio and Rochberg.

These influences, along with those from his undergraduate study, proved to be distinct and effective influences on his compositional output. As a student of composition, Schwantner continued to aspire with three works being recognized with BMI Student Composer Awards.

After completing his education, Schwantner obtained an assistant professor position at Pacific Lutheran University in 1968. He moved to a similar position at Ball State University in 1969 and then to the Eastman School of Music as a faculty member in 1970. Briefly leaving academia, Schwantner was composer in residence with the St. Louis Symphony from 1982 to 1984. In 1985, Schwantner's life and music were the subject of a documentary in WGBH Boston's Soundings series. The documentary focused mainly on the composition of his piece New Morning for the World, for narrator and orchestra.

His faculty work continued at the Juilliard School in 1986, and he has maintained a position at Yale University since 1999. Schwantner retired from his position at Eastman in 1999. His most notable commissions include the song cycle Magabunda for orchestra in 1983, A Sudden Rainbow in 1986, the guitar concerto From Afar... in 1987, and a piano concerto in 1988.

== Compositional style ==
One of Schwantner's early works, Diaphonia intervallum (1967), distinctly foreshadowed the important style traits that would later exist in his music. Beyond its serial structure, such elements as individualized style, pedal points, timbre experimentation, instrumental groupings, and the use of extreme ranges were apparent even at this formative stage of Schwantner's career. Upon his appointment to the faculty of the Eastman School of Music, Schwantner's work Consortium I was premiered in 1970. This piece clearly illustrates his personal use of serialism, including many twelve-tone rows hidden among the texture and using a specific intervallic structure to provide cohesion. Consortium II also continued this emphasis on his personal application of serialism.

From these works, Schwantner turned from his focus on serialism to delve into the effects of tone color in his compositions. This is clearly noticed in his extended use of percussion instruments. Examples of his use of timbre as an important compositional element are found in In aeternum (1973) and Elixir (1976). This can be seen in his larger works for band as well. In ...and the mountains rising nowhere (1977) the six percussionists play a total of 46 instruments in an effort to give the percussion section a more prominent role than what was typical for band works during the 1970s.

From this stage he began to also concentrate on obtaining clearer tonal centers in works such as Music of Amber (1981) and New Morning for the World: 'Daybreak of Freedom' (1982). Even as he embraces tonal centers, Schwantner resists the very conventional employment of the dominant-tonic relationships and the Western music expansion of that concept. Rather, Schwantner's tonal centers are created by pitch emphasis, perhaps like the American composer Aaron Copland in a piece like El Salón México. His serialism roots even purvey his tonal structures; clearly defined major and minor scales are scarce in Schwantner's music. Instead, he uses pitch sets to establish organization. Schwantner's later works have integrated minimalist elements. This can be seen in his monumental percussion concerto. However, a very present focus on timbre and tone remain quite evident. His scores are published by the Schott Helicon Music Corporation.

== Awards ==
- The Charles Ives Scholarship from the American Academy of Arts and Letters (1970)
- Four National Endowment for the Arts Grants (1974–1979)
- Kennedy Center Friedheim Competition First Prize (1981)
- Pulitzer Prize in Music (1979)
- Grammy Nomination for "Best New Classical Composition" (1985)
- Grammy Nomination for "Best Classical Composition" (1987)
- Honorary Doctor of Fine Arts from the University of Connecticut (2019)

== Works ==
=== Orchestra ===
- A Play of Shadows for Flute and Chamber Orchestra
- A Sudden Rainbow
- Aftertones of Infinity (1978)
- Angelfire (2002), Fantasy for Amplified Violin and Orchestra, written for the violinist Anne Akiko Meyers
- Beyond Autumn, Poem for Horn and Orchestra
- Concerto for Percussion and Orchestra (1994)
- Concerto for Piano and Orchestra (1988)
- Distant Runes and Incantations for Piano solo (amplified) and Orchestra
- Dreamcaller, three Songs for Soprano, Violin solo, and Orchestra
- Evening Land Symphony
- Freeflight, Fanfares & Fantasy
- From Afar..., Fantasy for Guitar and Orchestra
- Magabunda (Witchnomad), "four Poems of Agueda Pizarro" for Soprano and Orchestra
- Modus Caelestis
- Morning's Embrace (2006)
- New Morning for the World "Daybreak of Freedom" for Narrator and Orchestra (1982)
- September Canticle Fantasy (In Memoriam)
- Toward Light
- Chasing Light (2008)

=== Wind ensemble ===
- ...and the mountains rising nowhere (1977)
- From a Dark Millennium (1980)
- In evening's stillness... (1996)
- Recoil (2004)
- Percussion Concerto (transcribed by Andrew Boysen) (1997)
- Beyond Autumn (transcribed by Timothy Miles) (2006)
- New Morning for the World "Daybreak of Freedom" (transcribed by Nikk Pilato) (2007)
- Luminosity: Concerto for Wind Orchestra (2015)
- The Awakening Hour (2017)

=== Chamber ensemble ===
- Black Anemones, for soprano and piano
- Canticle of the Evening Bells, for solo flute, oboe/English horn, clarinet, bassoon, trumpet, horn, trombone, piano, percussion, and strings
- Chronicon, for bassoon and piano
- Consortium I, for flute, clarinet, violin, viola, cello
- Consortium II, for flute, clarinet, violin, cello, piano, and percussion
- Distant Runes and Incantations, for flute, clarinet, 2 violins, viola, cello, piano, and percussion
- Elixir, for flute, clarinet, violin, viola, cello, and piano
- Diaphonia Intervallum, for alto saxophone, flute, clarinet, 2 violins, viola, 2 celli, string bass, and piano
- In Aeternum (Consortium IV), for cello/bowed crotales, alto flute (flute, piano watergong, 2 crystal glasses), bass clarinet (clarinet, watergong, 2 crystal glasses), viola (violin, crotales), and percussion
- Music of Amber, for flute, clarinet/bass clarinet, violin, cello, piano and percussion
- Rhiannon's Blackbirds, for flute/piccolo, clarinet/bass clarinet, violin/viola, cello, piano, and percussion
- Soaring, for flute and piano
- Sparrows, for flute/piccolo, clarinet, violin, viola, cello, piano, soprano, and percussion

=== Solo ===
- Velocities (Moto Perpetuo) for solo marimba (1990)

== Representative performances ==
Concerto for Percussion, Movement 1: Con Forza on YouTube

- University of Michigan Band, 8 March 2012
- Michael Haithcock, conductor
- Jonathan Ovalle, percussion

... and the mountains rising nowhere on YouTube

- The President's Own United States Marine Band: The Bicentennial Collection

New Morning for the World: Daybreak of Freedom on YouTube

- The Lamont Wind Ensemble
- Dr. Joseph Martin, conductor
- Mayor Michael B. Hancock, guest narrator

New Morning for the World: Daybreak of Freedom (Premiere of wind ensemble version) on YouTube

- Florida State University Wind Orchestra
- Dr. Nikk Pilato, conductor
- Dr. David Eccles, narrator

From A Dark Millennium

- North Texas Wind Symphony
- Eugene Migliaro Corporon, conductor

== Selected discography ==
The Music of Joseph Schwantner (1997)

- Velocities
- Concerto for Percussion and Wind Orchestra
- New Morning for the World
- The National Symphony Orchestra, Evelyn Glennie, percussion and solo marimba, Leonard Slatkin, conductor
- BMG Classics/RCA Red Seal CD 09026-68692-2

From Afar..."A Fantasy for Guitar" and "American Landscapes" (1987)

- Saint Paul Chamber Orchestra, Sharon Isbin, guita, Hugh Wolff, conductor
- Virgin Classics CDC 7243-5-55083-2-4

New Morning for the World for narrator and orchestra

- The Eastman Philharmonia Orchestra, Willie Stargell, narrator, David Effron, music director
- Mercury 2890411 031–1

New Morning for the World "Daybreak of Freedom" (1982)

- Oregon Symphony, Raymond Bazemore, narrator, James DePreist, conductor
- Koch International Classics CD 3-7293-2H1

From a Dark Millennium "Dream Catchers" (1981)

- North Texas Wind Symphony, Eugene Corporon, conductor
- Klavier Records KCD 11089

In Evening's Stillness..."Wind Dances" (1996)

- North Texas Wind Symphony, Eugene Corporon, conductor
- Klavier Records KCD 11084

...and the mountains rising nowhere (1977)

- The Eastman Wind Ensemble
- Donald Hunsberger, music director
- Sony Records SK 47198

From a Dark Millennium (1981)

- Ithaca College Wind Ensemble, Rodney Winther, conductor
- Ithaca College School of Music
- Mark Records, Inc MCBS 35891

== See also ==
- Joseph Schwantner: New Morning for the World; Nicolas Flagello: The Passion of Martin Luther King
