= Aftertones of Infinity =

Symphonic poem by Joseph Schwantner

Aftertones of Infinity is a symphonic poem written by the American composer Joseph Schwantner. The work was commissioned by the American Composers Orchestra and completed in 1978. It was first performed by the American Composers Orchestra conducted by Lukas Foss in Alice Tully Hall, New York City, on January 29, 1979. The piece was later awarded the 1979 Pulitzer Prize for Music.

== Reception ==
Reviewing a 1991 revival of the piece, the music critic Allan Kozinn of The New York Times wrote:

The piece begins with a nonspecific shimmer and proceeds spacily for several moments before its strands begin to coalesce. When they do, the results are violent eruptions of percussion, brass and string writing, sometimes in patches so dense as to become a toneless aggregate. Invariably, haunting, lyrical passages emerge from these thickets. And in the work's final moments, the sounds of a glass harmonica and the orchestra's gentle vocalizing return the 15-minute work to the haziness of its starting point.
