= Alexander Zemlianichenko =

Russian photojournalist (born 1950)

- Александр Земляниченко
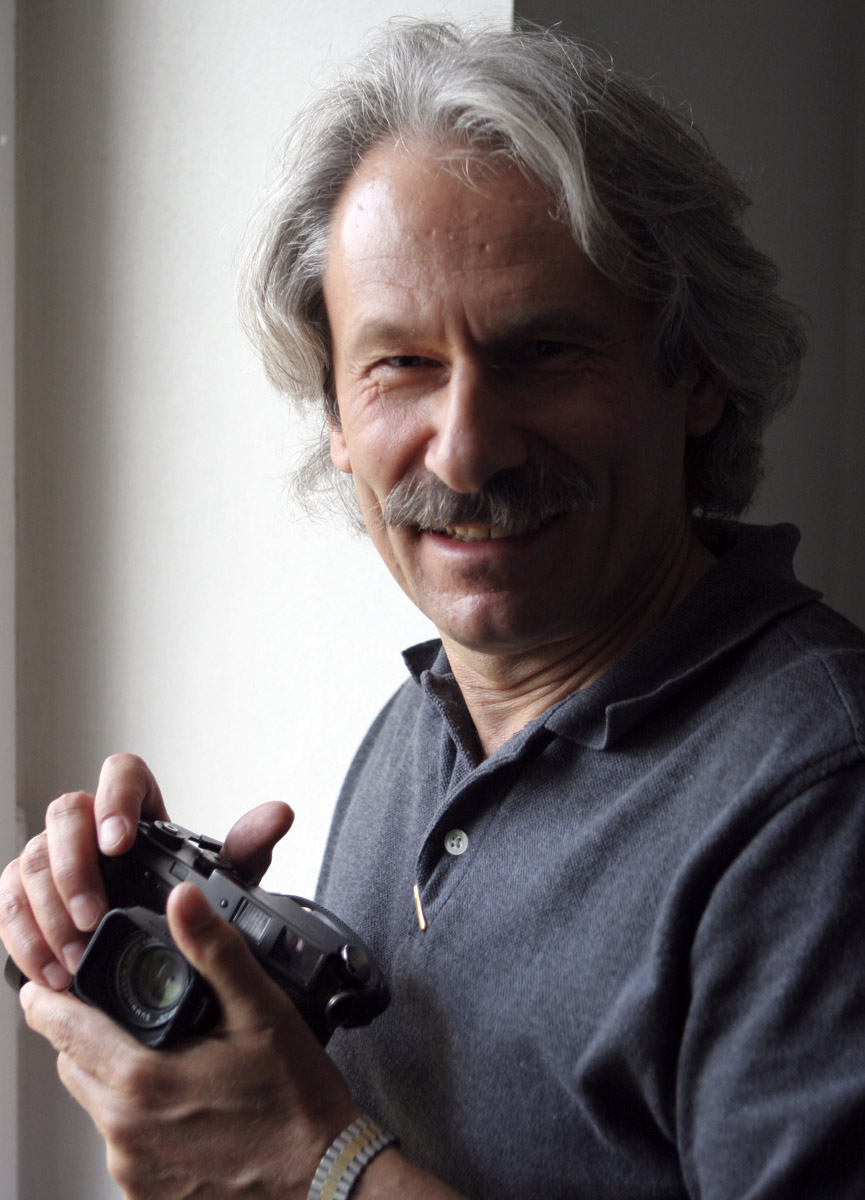
- Zemlianichenko in the Associated Press Bureau in Moscow, 2007. Photo by Mikhail Evstafiev
- Born: Alexander Vadimovich Zemlianichenko; 7 May 1950 (age 76); Saratov, Russian SFSR, Soviet Union
- Citizenship: Russia
- Education: Saratov State Technical University
- Occupation: Photojournalist
- Awards: Pulitzer Prize (1992, 1997)

Alexander Vadimovich Zemlianichenko (Russian: Александр Вадимович Земляниченко; born 7 May 1950) is a Russian photojournalist, two times Pulitzer Prize winner.

== Biography ==
Zemlianichenko was born on 7 May 1950, in Saratov, Russian SFSR, to a professional photojournalist. He became interested in photography during the school years, being a student he started working at Zarya Molodyozhi («Заря молодежи»). In 1974, Zemlianichenko graduated from the Saratov State Technical University with a degree in engineering. In the 1980s, he moved to Moscow and started working for the Rovesnik, later contributed to many other publications.

Since 1990 he has been working for the Associated Press. He has travelled extensively, covering news stories throughout the former Soviet Union, the Middle East, Europe, and the United States, during the First and the Second Chechen War.

He was one of five AP photographers who won the 1992 Pulitzer Prize for photos of the Soviet coup attempt of 1991. He also was a finalist in the 1995 Pulitzer competition for his photographs of the war in Chechnya, Russia. Zemlianichenko received his second Pulitzer Prize in 1997 for a photo of Russian president Boris Yeltsin dancing at a rock concert. The same photo won a World Press Photo award in 1996 (3rd prize).

In 1998 he was made the chief photographer of the Moscow Associated Press. He was later invited to be a jury member at World Press Photo. Member of the Kremlin pool. In 2018 he received the "Honored Journalist of the Russian Federation" award.
