= 1976 in poetry =

Nationality words link to articles with information on the nation's poetry or literature (for instance, Irish or France).

== Events ==
- January 1 – Two poems written in 1965 by Mao Zedong just before the Cultural Revolution, including "Two Birds: A Dialogue", are published
- April 5 – 1976 Tiananmen Incident in Beijing, China: the display of poems against the Gang of Four are among events provoking a police crackdown.
- Lille Stesichorus, the largest fragments of work attributed to Ancient Greek poet Stesichorus, are first published

== Works published in English ==
Listed by nation where the work was first published and again by the poet's native land, if different; substantially revised works listed separately:

=== Australia ===
- R. Berndt (ed.), Love Songs of Arnhem Land (anthology)
- John Blight, Selected Poems 1939–1975
- Anne Elder, posthumous, Crazy Woman
- John Forbes, Tropical Skiing (Poets of the Month Series), Sydney: Angus & Robertson.
- Les Murray:
  - "The Buladelah-Taree Holiday Song Cycle"
  - Selected Poems : The Vernacular Republic, Angus & Robertson
- John Tranter, The Alphabet Murders (notes from a work in progress), Angus & Robertson
- Chris Wallace-Crabbe, The Foundations of Joy (Poets of the Month Series), Sydney: Angus & Robertson.

=== Canada ===
- Earle Birney:
  - Alphabeings and Other Seasyours. London, Ont.: Pikadilly Press.
  - The Rugging and the Moving Times: poems new and uncollected 1976. Coatsworth, ON: Black Moss Press.
- Gary Geddes, War & Other Measures
- Roland Giguere, Miron translated from French
- Archibald Lampman, Lampman's Sonnets: The Complete Sonnets of Archibald Lampman, Margaret Coulby Whitridge ed. (Ottawa: Borealis). ISBN 978-0-919594-50-0
- Irving Layton, For My Brother Jesus. Toronto: McClelland and Stewart.
- Irving Layton, The Uncollected Poems of Irving Layton: 1936-59. Ed. W. David John. Ottawa, ON: Mosaic Press.
- Dennis Lee. The Death of Harold Ladoo. Vancouver: Kanchenjunga Press.
- Al Purdy, Sundance at Dusk
- James Reaney, Selected Longer Poems.
- Joe Rosenblatt, Top Soil, Selected Poems (1962-1975). Press Porcepic.
- Charles Sangster, Norland echoes and other strains and lyrics, ed. Frank M. Tierney (Tecumseh)
- Raymond Souster, To Hell with Poetry. Burton, Ohio.

Anthologies

- New Provinces reprinted—first anthology of modernist poetry in Canada (originally published 1936), including work by F. R. Scott, E. J. Pratt, Robert Finch, A. J. M. Smith, Leo Kennedy, A. M. Klein.

=== India in English ===
- Arun Kolatkar, Jejuri, Bombay: Clearing House, India.
- Nissim Ezekiel:
  - Hymns in Darkness, Delhi, Oxford University Press
  - Poster Prayers,
- Gieve Patel, How Do You Withstand, Body, Bombay, Clearing House, Indian, Indian poetry in English-language
- Keki Daruwalla, Crossing of Rivers, an experimental work published by the author's own publishing house; Bombay: Ezra-Fakir Press
- Adil Jussawalla, Missing Person,
- Jayanta Mahapatra:
  - A Father's Hours, Calcutta: United Writers
  - A Rain of Rites, Athens, Georgia: University of Georgia Press
- Arvind Krishna Mehrotra, Nine Enclosures,
- Meena Alexander, The Bird's Bright Ring, Calcutta: Writers Workshop, India.
- Arundhathi Subramaniam, Nine Enclosures (poetry in English), Mumbai: Clearing House
- Gauri Deshpande, An Anthology of Indo English Poetry, Delhi: Hind Pocket Books
- Nolini Kanta Gupta, Collected Works, five vols, published from 1971 to this year; Pondicherry: Sri Aurobindo Book Distribution Agency
- Rohini K. Gupta, Karna and Other Poems, Calcutta: Writers Workshop
- Om Prakash Bhatnagar, Thought Poems, Aligarh: Skylark Pub.
- Deb Kumar Das, Winterbird Walks, Calcutta: Writers Workshop
- Jagannath Prasad Das, First Person, Delhi: Arnold Heinemann
- Mukand R. Dave, Some Sheets of Paper, Aligarh: Skylark Pub.
- R. Parthasarathy (ed.), Ten Twentieth Century Indian Poets, Delhi: Oxford University Press

=== Ireland ===
- Ciarán Carson: The New Estate, Blackstaff Press, Wake Forest University Press
- John Ennis (poet), Night on Hibernia Oldcastle: The New Gallery Press, ISBN 978-0-902996-46-5
- Michael Longley, Man Lying on a Wall - Northern Ireland poet published in the United Kingdom
- George McWhirter, Queen of the Sea, Northern Ireland poet published in Canada

=== New Zealand ===
- James K. Baxter, posthumous
  - The Bone Chanter: Unpublished Poems 1945–72, edited by J. E. Weir
  - The Holy Life and Death of Concrete Grady: Various Uncollected and Unpublished Poems, edited by J. E. Weir
- Alan Brunton, Black & White Anthology, a 33-part sequence with an Asian setting, Hawk Press
- Vincent O'Sullivan, James K. Baxter, biography, New Zealand

=== United Kingdom ===
- Kenneth Allott, Collected Poems
- W. H. Auden, Collected Poems of W. H. Auden, edited by Edward Mendelson
- Pam Ayres, Some of Me Poetry and Some More of Me Poetry
- Frances Bellerby, The First Known (posthumous)
- Zoë Brooks, Owl Shadows and Whispering Stone "parallel booklets"
- George Mackay Brown, Winterfold
- Ciarán Carson: The New Estate, Blackstaff Press, Wake Forest University Press
- Elizabeth Daryush, Collected Poems
- David Day, Brass Rubbings
- Patric Dickinson, The Bearing Beast
- Gavin Ewart, No Fool Like an Old Fool
- Ruth Fainlight, Another Full Moon
- Tony Flynn, Separations
- Alistair Fowler, Catagomb Suburb
- Thom Gunn, Jack Straw's Castle, and Other Poems
- Adrian Henri, One Year, Todmorden, Lancashire: Arc Publications, ISBN 978-0-902771-47-5
- Ted Hughes, Season Songs
- Clive James, Peregrine Prykke's Pilgrimage Through the London Literary World and Britannia Bright's Bewilderment in the Wilderness of Westminster, Australian poet resident in the United Kingdom
- Glyn Jones, Selected Poems
- Peter Levi, Collected Poems
- Michael Longley, Man Lying on a Wall Northern Ireland poet published in the United Kingdom
- Hugh MacDiarmid, Collected Poems
- Hugh Maxton, The Noise of the Fields
- Humphrey John Moore, Collected Poems
- Eleanor Murray, Black and Sepia
- Luke Parsons, Last Poems
- Brian Patten, Vanishing Trick
- Rodney Pybus, Bridging Loans
- Peter Reading, The Prison Cell and Barrel Mystery
- Jon Silkin, The Little Time-Keeper
- Derek Walcott, Sea Grapes
- David Wright, A View of the North
- Edmund Leo Wright, The Horwich Hennets (the poet invented the "hennet", a 12-line hendecasyllabic verse with the rhymes "abacbcde deff")
- Paul Yates, Sky Made of Stone

==== Anthologies in the United Kingdom ====
- Elaine Feinstein, editor and translator, Three Russian Poets: Margarite Aliger, Yunna Morits, Bella Akhmadulina, Manchester, Carcanet Press
- F. E. S. Finn, Here and Human
- Antonia Fraser, Scottish Love Poems
- Dannie Abse, Poetry Dimension Annual 4
- Howard Sergeant, New Poems 1976/1977, P.E.N. anthology

=== United States ===
- Diane Ackerman, The Planets
- Paul Auster, translator, The Uninhabited, poetry translated from the original French of André du Bouchet
- Ted Berrigan, Red Wagon
- Elizabeth Bishop, Geography III, which includes the poem "One Art"
- Peter Blue Cloud, Turtle, Bear, and Wolf
- Raymond Carver, At Night The Salmon Move
- Maxine Chernoff, Vegetable Emergency, prose poems (Beyond Baroque Foundation)
- Robert Creeley, Selected Poems
- James Dickey, The Zodiac
- Ed Dorn, translator, Selected Poems of Cesar Vallejo, Penguin
- Charles Doyle, James K. Baxter, Boston: Twayne (Twayne's World Authors Series); study of the New Zealand poet
- Irving Feldman, Leaping Clear
- Marya Fiamengo, In Praise of Older Women
- Stratis Haviaras, Crossing the River Twice (Greek poet writing in English)
- John Hollander, Reflections on Espionage
- Robert Lowell, Selected Poems
- James Merrill: Divine Comedies, including "Lost in Translation" and "The Book of Ephraim", a long narrative poem
- N. Scott Momaday, The Gourd Dancer
- Lorine Niedecker, Blue Chicory (published posthumously)
- Simon Ortiz, Going for the Rain
- Kenneth Rexroth, 100 More Poems from the Japanese
- Charles Reznikoff, Poems 1918-1936
- Muriel Rukeyser, The Gates
- Anne Sexton, 45 Mercy Street (posthumous)
- James Tate, Viper Jazz

==== Criticism, scholarship and biography in the United States ====
- Harold Bloom, Poetry and Repression, the final volume of a tetralogy that began with The Anxiety of Influence in 1973
- Cleanth Brooks and Robert Penn Warren, Understanding Poetry (college textbook), originally published in 1938, goes into its fourth edition (after revised editions in 1950 and 1960); this would be the final edition before the deaths of the authors

=== Other in English ===
- Shana Yardan, The Listening of Eyes (Guyana)

== Works published in other languages ==
Listed by language and often by nation where the work was first published and again by the poet's native land, if different; substantially revised works listed separately:

=== Denmark ===
- Jørgen Gustava Brandt:
  - Jothárram
  - Mit hjerte i København
  - Regnansigt
- Klaus Høeck, Pentagram, publisher: Gyldendal
- Jørgen Nash, Her er jeg
- Henrik Nordbrandt, Glas ("Glass") Copenhagen: Gylendal, 53 pp.
- Klaus Rifbjerg, Stranden
- Jørgen Sonne, Huset ("The House")

=== Finland ===
- Paavo Haavikko, Viiniä, kirjoitusta
- Hannu Mäkelä, Synkkyys pohjaton, ninn myös iloni, onneni
- Jarkko Laine, Viidenpennin Hamlet
- Matti Rossi, Laulu tummana tulevi
- Matti Kuusi, Kansanruno Kalevala, a reconstruction of the folk poems that formed the basis of the Finnish national epic, Kaalevala, compiled in 1849 by Elias Lönnrot.

=== French language ===
==== France ====
- Anne-Marie Albiach, Objet
- Roland Bacri, Roland Bacri (the name of the author and book are the same)
- Hervé Bazin, Traits
- Jean Berthet, L'éternel instant
- Philippe Chabaneix, Dix nouvelles romances
- René Char, Aromates chasseurs ("Hunter's Aromatic Herbs")
- Jean Daive, Le jeu des séries scéniques
- Christian Dedeyan, Chant du Houlme
- Roger Giroux, Théatre, published posthumously (died 1973)
- Robert Houdelot, Les Treize
- Edmond Jabès, Le Livre des Ressemblances
- Jacques Marlet, Toi qui pâlis au nom de Vancouver
- Robert Marteau, Atlante
- Jacques Prévert, Grand Bal du printemps
- Raymond Queneau, Morale élémentaire
- J. P. Seguin, LAnnée poétique 1975

===== Criticism, scholarship and biography =====
- John Edwin Jackson, a study of Yves Bonnefoy

==== Canada ====
- Georges Cartier, Chanteaux
- Paul Chanel Malenfant, Poèmes de la mères pays
- Marie Uguay, Signe et rumeur
- A Quebec collective of women, La Nef des sorcières

=== German language ===
==== West Germany ====
- Horst Bienek, Gleiwitzer Kindheit
- Hans Magnus Enzensberger, Mausoleum: Thirty Seven Ballads from the History of Progress
- Michael Krüger, Reginapoly
- Ernst Meister, Im Zeitspalt
- Aleksandr Solzhenitsyn, Prussian Nights, translated into German from the original Russian by Nikolaus Ehlert; first written in 1951; first published in 1974
- Jürgen Theobaldy and Gustav Zürcher, Veränderung der Lyrik: Über westdeutsche Gedichte seit 1965

==== East Germany ====
- Erich Arendt, Memento und Bild

=== India ===
Listed in alphabetical order by first name:

- Amritdhari Singha, Avatar rahasya, India, Maithili-language
- Heeraben Pathak, Paraloke Patra, a poem addressing her deceased husband, poet Ramnarayan Pathak; Indian poet writing in Gujarati-language
- Joy Goswami Christmas o Sheeter Sonnetguchcho ("Sonnets of Christmas and Winter"), the author's first book of poetry; Bangladeshi-language
- K. Siva Reddy, Aasupatrigeetam, Hyderabad: Jhari Poetry Circle, Telugu-language
- Namdeo Dhasal, Priyadarshini; Marathi-language
- Nirendranath Chakravarti, Kobitar Bodoley Kobita, Kolkata: Bishhobani Prokashoni; Bengali-language
- Rajendra Kishore Panda, Anavatar O Anya Anya, Cuttack: Grantha Mandir, Oraya-language

=== Italy ===
- Dario Bellezza, Morta segreta
- Alberto Bevilacqua, La crudeltà
- Amelia Rosselli, Documento 1966-73
- Angelo M. Ripellino, La splendido violino verde
- Maria Luisa Spaziani, Ultrasuoni

=== Poland ===
- M. Jastrum (ed.), Poezja Mtodej Polski, anthology
- A. Lam (ed.), Kolumbowie i wspótcześni, second edition, anthology
- Z. Liberia (ed.), Poezja polska XVIII wieku ("Polish Poetry of the Eighteenth Century"), second edition, anthology
- Wisława Szymborska: Wielka liczba ("A Large Number")

=== Portuguese language ===
==== Portugal ====
- Ruy de Moura Belo, Toda a terra ("All of the Land")
- Carlos de Oliveira, Trabalho Poético
- Egito Gonçalves, Luz Vegital
- Eugénio de Andrade, Limar dos Pássaros
- António Ramos Rosa, Ciclo do Cavalo
- Pedro Tamen, Agora, Estar

==== Brazil ====
- Marcus Accioly, Sisifo, a long poem containing multiple forms of poetry, including the classical sonnet, concrete and popular Brazilian forms
- Yolanda Jordão, Biografia do Edificio e Anexos
- Adélia Prado, Bagagem

=== Spanish language ===
==== Spain ====
- Matilde Camus, Siempre amor ("Forever Love")
- Antonio Colinas, Sepulcro en Taruinia
- Justo Jorge Padrón, Los círculos del infierno
- Claudio Rodriguez, El vuelo de la celebración

==== Latin America ====
- Guadalupe Amor, El zoológico de Pita Amor
- Jomi García Ascot, Un modo de decir
- Arturo Corcuera, Las sirenas y las estaciones (Peru)
- José Emilio Pacheco, Islas à la deriva (Mexico)
- A workshop in "synthetic poetry" came out with Doce modos

=== Sweden ===
- Göran Sonnevi, Det omöjliga
- Sten Hagliden, Kvällsordat
- Barbro Lindgren, Rapporter från marken

=== Other languages ===
- Gerrit Kouwenaar, Verzamelde Gedichten (Netherlands)
- Alexander Mezhirov, Под старым небом ("Under the Old Sky"), Russia, Soviet Union

== Awards and honors ==
=== Australia ===
- Grace Leven Prize for Poetry: John Blight, Selected Poems 1939–1975

=== Canada ===
- See 1976 Governor General's Awards for a complete list of winners and finalists for those awards.

=== United Kingdom ===
- Cholmondeley Award: Peter Porter, Fleur Adcock
- Eric Gregory Award: Stewart Brown, Valerie Gillies, Paul Groves, Paul Hyland, Nigel Jenkins, Andrew Motion, Tom Paulin, William Peskett

=== United States ===
- Consultant in Poetry to the Library of Congress (later the post would be called "Poet Laureate Consultant in Poetry to the Library of Congress"): Robert Hayden appointed this year.
- Frost Medal: A.M. Sullivan
- National Book Award for Poetry: John Ashbery, Self-portrait in a Convex Mirror
- Pulitzer Prize for Poetry: John Ashbery: Self-Portrait in a Convex Mirror
- Walt Whitman Award: Laura Gilpin, The Hocus-Pocus of the Universe
- Fellowship of the Academy of American Poets: J. V. Cunningham
- Lenore Marshall Poetry Prize: Denise Levertov, The Freeing of the Dust (Judge: Hayden Carruth)

== Births ==
- September 2 – Tim Key, English comic performer and performance poet
- Jen Hadfield, British poet and visual artist
- Meghan O'Rourke, American writer, editor and poet; writer for Slate; a poetry editor for The Paris Review
- Yolanda Wisher, African American poet and spoken word artist

== Deaths ==
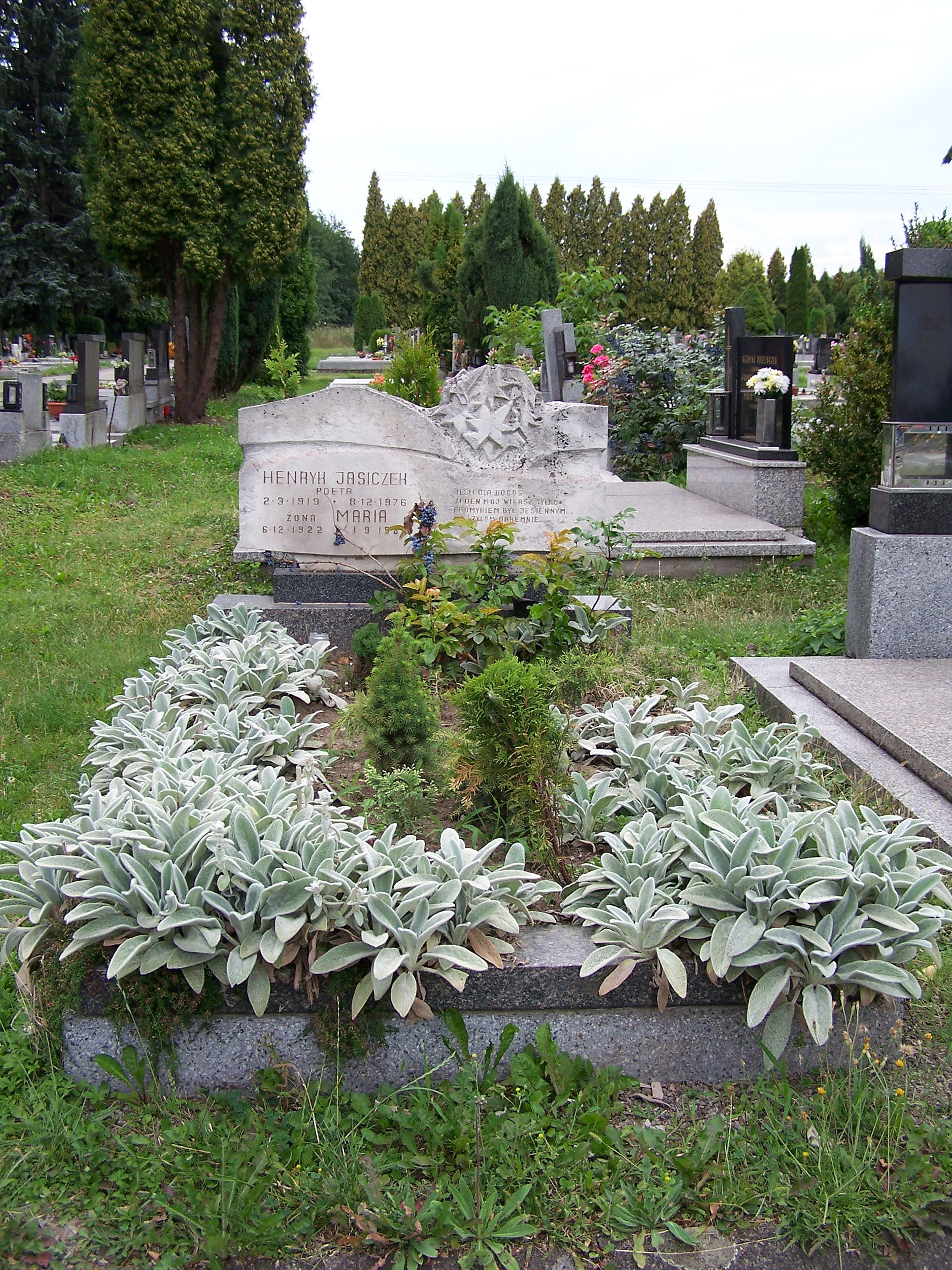
Grave of Polish journalist, poet, writer and dissident Henryk Jasiczek.

Birth years link to the corresponding "[year] in poetry" article:

- January 22 – Charles Reznikoff, 81 (born 1894), American Objectivist poet
- March 7 – Tove Ditlevsen, 58 (born 1917), Danish poet and fiction writer, suicide by overdose
- March 10 – L. E. Sissman, 48 (born 1928), American poet, advertising executive and Quiz Kid, of Hodgkin's disease
- March 12 – Lloyd Frankenberg, 67 (born 1907), American poet, anthologist and critic, husband of painter Loren MacIver
- April 9 – Saneatsu Mushanokōji 武者小路 実篤 實篤, sometimes known as "Mushakōji Saneatsu"; other pen-names included "Musha" and "Futo-o", 90 (born 1885), Japanese, late Taishō period and Shōwa period novelist, playwright, poet, artist and philosopher
- April 28 – Richard Hughes, 76 (born 1900), English poet, fiction writer and screenwriter
- May 11 – Ogiwara Seisensui 荻原井泉水, pen name of Ogiwara Tōkichi, 91 (born 1884), Japanese haiku poet in the Taishō and Shōwa periods
- July 4 – Antoni Słonimski, 80, (born 1895), Polish poet and writer
- July 11 – León de Greiff, 80, (born 1895), Colombian poet
- August 9 – José Lezama Lima, 65, (born 1910), Cuban poet and writer
- August 19 – Jan Nisar Akhtar, 62 (born 1914), Indian poet of Urdu ghazals and nazms, a lyricist for Bollywood and father of psychiatrist and poet Salman Akhtar
- August 29 – Kazi Nazrul Islam (also spelled "Kazi Nozrul Islam"), 77 (born 1899), Bengali poet, musician, revolutionary and philosopher best known as the Bidrohi Kobi ("Rebel Poet"), popular among Bengalis and considered the national poet of Bangladesh
- September 30 – Paul Dehn, 63 (born 1912), English screenwriter and poet
- October 15 – James McAuley, 59 (born 1917), Australian poet, academic, journalist and literary critic
- October 18 – Viswanatha Satyanarayana, 81 (born 1895), Indian poet writing in Telugu; popularly known as the Kavi Samraat ("Emperor of Poetry")
- October 23 – Anne Elder, 58 (born 1918), Australian ballet dancer and poet, of cardiopulmonary disease
- December 8 – Henryk Jasiczek, 57 (born 1919), Polish journalist, poet, writer and dissident
- Full date unknown – Henriette Sauret (born 1890), French poet, political writer, journalist

== See also ==
- Poetry
- List of poetry awards
- List of years in poetry

== Notes ==
- Britannica Book of the Year 1977 ("for events of 1976"), published by Encyclopædia Britannica 1977 (source of many items in "Works published" section and rarely in other sections)
