= 1976 in Australian literature =

This article presents a list of the historical events and publications of Australian literature during 1976.

== Major publications ==
=== Books ===
- Nancy Cato and Vivienne Rae Ellis – Queen Trucanini
- Robert Drewe – The Savage Crows
- Helen Hodgman – Blue Skies
- David Ireland – The Glass Canoe
- Gwen Kelly – Middle-Aged Maidens
- Thomas Keneally – Season in Purgatory
- Frank Moorhouse – Conference-Ville
- Gerald Murnane – A Lifetime on Clouds
- Betty Roland – Beyond Capricorn
- Wendy Scarfe – The Lotus Throne
- Christina Stead – Miss Herbert (The Suburban Wife)
- Morris West – The Navigator
- Glen Tomasetti – Thoroughly Decent People: A Folk Tale
- Christine Townend – Travels with Myself
- Patrick White – A Fringe of Leaves

=== Short stories ===
- Glenda Adams – Lies and Stories
- Shirley Hazzard – "A Long Story Short"
- Elizabeth Jolley – Five Acre Virgin and Other Stories
- Dal Stivens – The Unicorn and Other Tales

=== Science Fiction and Fantasy ===
- A. Bertram Chandler – The Way Back
- Lee Harding
  - The Altered I : An Encounter with Science Fiction (edited)
  - Beyond Tomorrow (edited)
  - Future Sanctuary
- David Lake – Walkers on the Sky

=== Children's and Young Adult fiction ===
- Hesba Brinsmead – Under the Silkwood
- Elyne Mitchell – Son of the Whirlwind
- Anne Parry – The Land Behind the World
- Ruth Park – Merchant Campbell
- Eleanor Spence – The October Child
- Colin Thiele – The Hammerhead Light

=== Poetry ===
- Stefanie Bennett
  - The Medium
  - Tongues and Pinnacles
- John Blight – Selected Poems 1939–1975
- Joanne Burns – Adrenaline Flicknife
- Laurie Duggan – East: Poems 1970-74
- Anne Elder – Crazy Woman and Other Poems
- Geoffrey Lehmann – Selected Poems
- Les Murray
  - "The Buladelah-Taree Holiday Song Cycle"
  - Selected Poems : The Vernacular Republic
- Judith Wright – Fourth Quarter

=== Drama ===
- Jennifer Compton – Crossfire
- Dorothy Hewett
  - This Old Man Comes Rolling Home
  - The Tatty Hollow Story
- Peter Kenna – Mates
- Steve J. Spears – The Elocution of Benjamin Franklin
- Ric Throssell – For Valour (first performed 1960)
- David Williamson – A Handful of Friends

=== Non-fiction ===
- Donald Horne – Death of the Lucky Country
- Gavin Souter – Lion and Kangaroo
- Hugh Stretton – Capitalism, Socialism and the Environment

== Awards and honours ==
=== Lifetime achievement ===
Award	Author
Christopher Brennan Award	A. D. Hope
Patrick White Award	John Blight

=== Literary ===
Award	Author	Title	Publisher
The Age Book of the Year Award	A. D. Hope	A Late Picking : Poems 1965-1974	Angus & Robertson
The Age Book of the Year Award	Hugh Stretton	Capitalism, Socialism and the Environment	Cambridge University Press
ALS Gold Medal	No award		
Colin Roderick Award	Gavin Souter	Lion and Kangaroo	Collins

=== Fiction ===
Award	Author	Title	Publisher
The Age Book of the Year Award	A. D. Hope	A Late Picking : Poems 1965-1974	Angus & Robertson
Miles Franklin Award	David Ireland	The Glass Canoe	Macmillan

=== Children and Young Adult ===
Award	Category	Author	Title	Publisher
Children's Book of the Year Award	Older Readers	Ivan Southall	Fly West	Angus and Robertson
Children's Book of the Year Award	Picture Book	Dick Roughsey	The Rainbow Serpent	Collins

=== Science fiction and fantasy ===
Award	Category	Author	Title	Publisher
Australian SF Achievement Award	Best Australian Science Fiction	A. Bertram Chandler	The Big Black Mark	DAW Books

=== Poetry ===
Award	Author	Title	Publisher
Grace Leven Prize for Poetry	John Blight	Selected Poems 1939–1975	Nelson

=== Drama ===
Award	Author	Title
AWGIE Award for Stage	Not awarded	

=== Non-fiction ===
Award	Author	Title	Publisher
The Age Book of the Year Award	Hugh Stretton	Capitalism, Socialism and the Environment	Cambridge University Press

== Births ==
A list, ordered by date of birth (and, if the date is either unspecified or repeated, ordered alphabetically by surname) of births in 1976 of Australian literary figures, authors of written works or literature-related individuals follows, including year of death.

- 26 May — Marieke Hardy, writer

Unknown date

- Kate Morton, novelist

== Deaths ==
A list, ordered by date of death (and, if the date is either unspecified or repeated, ordered alphabetically by surname) of deaths in 1976 of Australian literary figures, authors of written works or literature-related individuals follows, including year of birth.

- 18 February — Catherine Shepherd, playwright (born 1901)
- 16 April – Nina Murdoch, poet and biographer (born 1890)
- 2 June – Lyndall Hadow, short story writer and journalist (born 1903)
- 6 August — George Farwell, novelist (born 1911)
- 14 August — James Devaney, novelist (born 1890)
- 22 August – Ella McFadyen, poet (born 1887)
- 15 October – James McAuley, poet (born 1917)
- 23 October – Ian Mudie, poet (born 1911)

== See also ==
- 1976 in Australia
- 1976 in literature
- 1976 in poetry
- List of years in Australian literature
- List of years in literature
