= Woman (TV series) =

American television series

Woman is an American weekly half-hour television series which aired on WNED-TV. Each episode featured a discussion with one or more guest speakers on issues relevant to women and their lives. The series was produced by Sandra Elkin and hosted by Samantha Dean. The series was syndicated for nationwide airing on PBS, a first for one of WNED-TV's programs. Following syndication, Elkin became the series' host. The show premiered in September 1972 and ended in 1977, having produced around 200 episodes.

As a host, Elkin was praised for her "candid and honest approach," and the program was praised for its informational nature. In Elkin's words, "we don't play the usual talk show games on Woman...There's no baiting guests or embarrassing them. Our purpose is to provide information".

== Development and production ==
Elkin approached WNED-TV with the idea for the series in 1972, after hearing from local women that they wanted access to more information on women's issues, and women's health in particular. The station's program director liked Elkin's proposal, and after two weeks of negotiation the station agreed to fund production of the show's first season. Elkin had no experience working in television at the time.

The show was well-received upon its debut. Six months after the series premiered on WNED-TV, the Eastern Educational Network began airing the show as well. PBS picked up the show after its first season finished airing; by 1974, the show was broadcast on 185 member stations across the country.

All episodes of the show were filmed in Buffalo, with the exception of two episodes focusing on women in prison, which were filmed at KECT-TV in St Louis, Missouri.

In the mid-1980s, feminist Andrea Dworkin and the president of WNED-TV exchanged communications on preserving and archiving the tapes of Woman still being stored by the station.

== Episodes ==
All information comes from the American Archive of Public Broadcasting.

=== Season 1 ===
Ep. No	Title	Guests	Air Date
001	Frigidity	Psychoanalyst Robert Seidenberg, gynecologist Stanford Copley, and psychologist Gloria Roblyn.	September 24, 1972
002	Menopause	Writer Mary Lou Fox, gynecologist Wayne Johnson, and psychiatrist Bohdana Salaban.	October 8, 1972
003	Birth Control	Ruth Miller of The Buffalo Planned Parenthood Association.	October 17, 1972
004	Alternatives to Traditional Marriage	Nena O'Neil, author of Open Marriage, and Karen DeCrow, a feminist lawyer from Syracuse, New York	November 12, 1972
005			
006			
007	The Childless Couple	Ellen Peck.	December 7, 1972
008	Sexual Problems in Marriage	Richard A. Spitz and Mae A. Biggs, a co-therapy team at the Masters and Johnson Clinic in St. Louis, Missouri.	
009	The Medicine Cabinet Addict	Dr. Christopher D'Amanda, Jana Henderson, and Richard Metter	
010	The Woman Alcoholic	Michael Merrick of the Buffalo Area Council on Alcoholism, and two former women alcoholics	
011	Sudden Infant Death Syndrome	Lynn Runfola, Paul Dyson, and Judy Choate, the founder and executive director of the National Foundation of Sudden Infant Death Syndrome	
012	What to Tell Children about Birth, Death, Adoption, and Divorce	Cynthia Clayton, M.D. and Audrey Worrell, M.D.	
013	Sex Education		January 7, 1973
014	Role Definition	Wilma Scott Heide, president of the National Organization of Women	January 17, 1973
015	The Bright Child	Joan Hovorka and Thomas Ahern	January 25, 1973
016	Teens and Drugs	Thomas Regent, Chief of Toxicology in the Erie County Laboratory, and James Creighton, Erie County Medical Examiner.	February 1, 1973
017	Special Medical Problems of Children	Roberta Glick	February 8, 1973
018	Teenagers Today with Dr. Benjamin Spock	Pediatrician and author Benjamin Spock	February 15, 1973
019	The Sexually Active Teen	Dr. Stanford Copley and Steven Salyer, who argue in favor of teenagers having access to birth control	January 10, 1973
020	Birth Control Part 2	Fordham professor William Mara	March 22, 1973
021			
022	Self Examination, Part 1		February 6, 1973
023	Self Examination Part 2: Another View	Dr. Theodore Schulman and Dr. Virginia Rubenstein	March 8, 1973
024	The Older Woman and Ageism	Peggy Niven and Dorothy Tennov	March 22, 1973
025	Black Women	Dorothy Pitman Hughes and Julia Van Metre	March 29, 1973
026			
027	Women and Psychology	Psychologist Dr. Jo Ann Evansgardner	April 26, 1973
028	Women and the Law	Attorneys Cathy Douglas and Karen DeCrow	March 15, 1973
029			
030	Women as a Political Force		May 2, 1973

=== Season 2 ===
Ep. No.	Title	Guests	Air Date
101	Our Bodies Ourselves	Wilma Diskin and Judy Norsigian of the Boston Women's Health Book Collective	December 18, 1973
102	Why Women are Dissatisfied with their Gynecologist	Columnist Ellen Frankfort and author Barbara Seaman	October 25, 1973
103	The Woman Alone	Authors Harriet La Barre, Patricia Obrien and Gail North	November 1, 1973
104	Men's Liberation	Author and activist Warren Farrell	November 8, 1973
105	Image of Women in Media	Broadcasters Jan Chaney and Joyce Snyder	November 15, 1973
106	Equal Rights Amendment, Part 1	Anne Scott and Karen DeCrow	November 29, 1973
107	Equal Rights Amendment, Part 2	Phyllis Schlafly and Geline B. Williams	December 6, 1973
108	Sexism in Religion	Audrey Gellis and Patricia McQuilllan	December 13, 1973
109	Re-Entering the Job Market	Felice N. Schwartz, president of Catalyst, and career consultant Janice LaRouche	December 20, 1973
110	Woman's Liberation, A Dissent	Midge Decter and Lucianne Goldberg	January 3, 1974
111	Divorce Insurance	Lawyer Diana DuBroff	January 10, 1974
112	Menstruation & Pre-Menstrual Tension	Cynthia Clayton, M.D. and Leah Cahan Schaefer	January 17, 1974
113	Consciousness Raising	Judy Sullivan and Claudia Dreifus	January 24, 1974
114	Betty Friedan	Author and activist Betty Friedan	January 30, 1974
115	Sexism in Religion, Another View	Fordham University professor Dr. William A. Marra and Rabbi Robert Alper	January 31, 1974
116	Mastectomy	Suzanne Johnson	February 7, 1974
117	Sex Bias in Education, Part 1	Judy Wenning and Phyllis AlRoy	February 21, 1974
118	Sex Bias in Education, Part 2	Andrea Ostrum and Barbara Rothberg	February 21, 1974
119	Childbirth. Part 1	Dr. Mortimer Rosen and Doris Haire	March 7, 1974
120	Childbirth, Part 2	Dr. Sumner Yaffe and Doris Haire	February 8, 1974
121	Women and Insurance	attorney Kathleen Peratis	March 14, 1974
122	Female Homosexuality	Barbara Love	March 28, 1974
123	Viveca Lindfors	Viveca Lindfors	
124	Corporate Wives	Dr. Robert Siedenburg and Robert O. Soman	April 11, 1974
125	Credibility Gap Credit for Women	Nancy Polokoff	April 18, 1974
126	Economics & The American Woman	Elizabeth Forsling Harris	May 2, 1974
127	Food for Thought	Maruka Fernandez and Dr. Eleanor Williams	May 9, 1974

=== Season 3 ===
Ep. No.	Title	Guests	Air Date
	Margaret Sloan on Black Sisterhood	feminist writer Margaret Sloan	August 4, 1974
	Unlikely Addicts: Middle Class Women	journalist Barbara Kerr	August 14, 1974
	The Marriage Savers	Professors Catherine S. Chilman and David Olson	August 21, 1974
	Mothers Who Leave Home	author Judy Sullivan	August 24, 1974
	Female Sexuality. Part 1		
	Female Sexuality. Part 2	Helen Singer Kaplan and Shere Hite	September 4, 1974
	Menopause: How to Cope	Mary C. Howell, M.D. and writer Paula Weideiger	September 12, 1974
	Picking up the Pieces: One Widow Speaks	author Lynn Caine	September 18, 1974
	N.O.W. Now	Karen DeCrow	September 18, 1974
	Women Workers	historian Barbara Wertheimer and union organizer Margie Albert	September 19, 1974
	Write on Women Playwrights	playwright Myrna Lamb	September 25, 1974
	Women and Children's Liberation in China	author and social worker Ruth Sidel	October 16, 1974
	Congresswoman Bella Abzug	Bella Abzug	October 22, 1974
	The Remarrieds	psychologist Dr. Hanna Kapit	October 30, 1974
	Two Profession Marriages	Gail Parker and Tom Parker, President and Vice President of Bennington College	November 6, 1974
	Mister Midwife	Midwife Norman Casserly	November 14, 1974
	A Conversation with Gloria Steinem	Gloria Steinem	December 5, 1974
	Non-Sexist Non-Racist Toys for Children	Jane Galvin Lewis, a co-founder of the National Black Feminist Organization	December 5, 1974
	Single Parent Experience	reporter Marjorie Margolies	December 20, 1974
	The Youngest Consumers: How TV Food Commercials Program Children and Parents	Joan Gussow and Catherine Clancy	January 9, 1975
	Suffragist Florence H. Luscomb	architect and women's suffrage activist Florence Luscomb	January 16, 1975
	Occupation Mother	counselors Ruth Armin and Phyllis Broady	February 6, 1975
	The Perfect Mother	author and activist Shirley L. Radl and nurse Angela Barren McBride	February 6, 1975
	Changing Motherhood	sociologist Jessie Bernard	February 6, 1975
	The IUD Controversy: More Information	Richard Dickey, M.D. and lawyer Marcia Greenberger	March 6, 1975
	Dr. Jean Mayer on Nutrition	Jean Mayer	April 1, 1975
	Feminist Therapy	sociologist Pauline Bart	April 8, 1975
	Mental Health Care for Women. Part 1	psychologist Naomi Weisstein and psychiatrist Anne Seiden	April 10, 1975
	Mental Health Care for Women. Part 2	psychologist Naomi Weisstein and psychiatrist Anne Seiden	April 10, 1975
	Cosmetic Surgery	surgeon Sida Prono	April 10, 1975
	Household Workers	attorney Edith Barksdale Sloan and LPN Josephine Hulett	April 15, 1975
	Beyond the Beauty Myths	author Deborah Chase	April 15, 1975
	Female Homosexuality	author Barbara Love	April 28, 1975
	Women in Policing	Margaret Gates	April 29, 1975
	Women in Prison. Part 1	filmmaker Nancy Margolis	May 16, 1975
	Women in Prison. Part 2	inmates Carolyn Dillard and Peggy Russell	May 16, 1975
	Rape. Part 1		June 24, 1975
	Rape. Part 2	Susan Brownmiller	June 24, 1976
	Affirmative Action	Barbara Boyle Sullivan	June 26, 1976
	Women's Studies	academics Catherine Stimpson and Liz Kennedy	July 1, 1975
	Photographer Elsa Dorfman	Elsa Dorfman	July 1, 1975
	Child Custody	Dan Molinoff and attorney Doris Sassower	July 9, 1975
	A Conversation with Florynce Kennedy	Florynce Kennedy	July 17, 1975
	Title IX	Margaret Dunkle and Michael Blouin	July 23, 1975
	Women and Depression	academic and writer Myrna Weissman	July 24, 1975

=== Season 4 ===
Ep. No.	Title	Guests	Air Date
	Female Sexuality. Part 1	Dr. Mary Jane Sherfey and Barbara Seaman	August 8, 1975
	Mothers and Daughters	author Signe Hammer	August 19, 1975
	A Conversation With Elizabeth Janeway. Part 1	author Elizabeth Janeway	August 20, 1975
	A Conversation With Elizabeth Janeway. Part 2	author Elizabeth Janeway	August 20, 1975
	Feminist Art	artist Judy Chicago	August 25, 1975
	Unnecessary Surgery	authors Barbara Ehrenreich and Barbara Seaman	September 9, 1975
	Women in Transition: Separation and Divorce	authors Carolyn Kott Washburne and Jennifer Fleming of Philadelphia-based support group Women in Transition	September 23, 1975
	Sisters In Crime	Frieda Adler	September 23, 1975
	Puerto Rican Women's Federation	co-founders Sisten Elida Rodriquez and Lourdes Vasquez	September 23, 1975
	The Battle For The Vote. Part 1	director and writer Midge Mackenzie	September 24, 1975
	The Battle For The Vote. Part 2	director and writer Midge Mackenzie	September 24, 1975
	Women's Health Care: A History	historian Virginia Drachman	October 21, 1975
	Birth Experiences	Lolly Hirsch	November 6, 1975
	One Woman's Divorce	editor and writer Susan Braudy	November 10, 1975
	Nora Ephron on Everything	columnist Nora Ephron	November 17, 1975
326	Breast Cancer Controversies	author Rose Kushner	December 4, 1975
327	Househusbands	Reese Sarda and Ross Bachelder	December 4, 1975
328	Sterilization and Consent	attorney Antonia Hernandez and journalist Claudia Dreifus	October 22, 1975
329	Controversies within the Women's Movement. Part 1	Karen DeCrow	December 19, 1975
330	Controversies Within the Women's Movement. Part 2	Betty Friedan	December 23, 1975
331			
332	Women, Money and Power	psychologist Phyllis Chesler	December 2, 1975
333	Money and the Single Woman	author Martha Yates	December 16, 1975
334			
335	Mental Health Care: One Patient's View	author Janet Gotkin	December 18, 1975
336			
337	Battered Wives	Del Martin and Lisa Leghorn	January 26, 1976
338	The Myth of the Happy Child	Carole Klein	January 9, 1976
339	The Proper Place for Women in the Church	Loyola University professor Mary Griffin and Patricia Hughes, a member of the Executive Committee for Women in Future Priesthood, a Call for Action	January 30, 1976
340			
341	Sex Therapy. Part 1	Dr. Helen Singer Kaplan	January 24, 1976
342	Sex Therapy. Part 2	Dr. Helen Singer Kaplan	January 24, 1976
343	Food Additives: Harmful or Helpful. Part 1	Beatrice Trum Hunter	February 6, 1976
344	Food Additives: Harmful or Helpful. Part 2	Beatrice Trum Hunter	February 6, 1976
345	The Lady Vanishes: Where are the Women in Films?	Midge Kovacs and journalist Marjorie Rosen	March 26, 1976
346	Women's Image: Down The Tube	Joyce Snyder and Kathleen Bonk, co-coordinators of the NOW Media Task Force	February 13, 1976
347	Women's Pages	journalists Barbara Hinton and Judy Klemesrud	February 24, 1976
348	Feminist Press	Nancy Borman, founder of Majority Report, and Janis Kelly, member of the Off-Our-Backs Collective	February 17, 1976
349	Chris Williamson and Women's Music	Chris Williamson	March 4, 1976
350	Political Parties: Women's Clout	Carol Burris, founder of The Women's Lobby, Inc and political scientist Susan Tolchin	April 2, 1976
351	Unnecessary Surgery: Physicians React	Grady Duke, M.D., and James Walker, M.D.	April 1, 1976
352	Women's Coalition for the Third Century	activist Wilma Scott Heide	March 25, 1976

=== Season 5 ===
Ep. No.	Title	Guests	Air Date
401	Humor by Women	writers Anne Beatts and Deanne Stillman	August 5, 1976
402	The Estrogen Controversy, Part 1	Dr. Takuma Nemoto, Rose Kushner, and Dr. Rose Ruth Ellison	July 20, 1976
403	The Estrogen Question, Part 2	Dr. Takuma Nemoto, Rose Kushner, and Dr. Rose Ruth Ellison	July 20, 1976
404	Contemporary Women Poets	poets Audre Lorde and Marge Piercy	August 3, 1976
405	New Image for Nurses. Part 1	June Rothberg, Ph.D., Jean Spero, Ph.D., and Joanne Ashley, Ph. D.	September 2, 1976
406	New Image for Nurses. Part 2	June Rothberg, Ph.D., Jean Spero, Ph.D., and Joanne Ashley, Ph. D.	September 2, 1976
407	The Two Earner Family	economist Susan Edmiston and writer Carolyn Shaw Bell	September 24, 1976
408	Legislative Report	Carol Burris	September 13, 1976
409	How to Start Your Own Business. Part 1	Claudia Jessup and Genie Chipps, co-authors of The Woman's Guide to Starting a Business	October 12, 1976
410	How to Start Your Own Business. Part 2	Ann Smith, founder of Annie's Firehouse Soup Kitchen, Inc. and Ava Stern, founder of the journal Artemis for Enterprising Women	October 14, 1976
411	A Conversation with Jeanne Moreau. Part 1	actress Jeanne Moreau	October 22, 1976
412	A Conversation with Jeanne Moreau. Part 2	Jeanne Moreau	October 22, 1976
413	Engineered Foods: What Are They?	Beatrice Trum Hunter	September 27, 1976
414	Commentary on Filmed Interview with Simone de Beauvoir	Elizabeth Janeway and Gloria Steinem on Dorothy Tennov's interview of Simone de Beauvoir	November 12, 1976
415	Working Class Women	writer and advocate Nancy Seifer and social worker Mary Sansone	November 12, 1976
416	New Roles for Women in Sports	sprinter Linda Huey and Jane Fishman	November 5, 1976
417			
418	Women and Taxes	author Martha Yates	December 16, 1976
419	Sexual Abuse of Children	Social workers Florence Rush and Linda Sanford	October 26, 1976
420	Masculine, Feminine, and Androgyny	psychologist Joan Bean	January 6, 1977
421	Women and Heart Attacks. Part 1	cardiologist Nanette Wenger and physician Harriet Dustin	December 21, 1976
422	Women and Heart Attacks. Part 2	Nanette Wenger, M.D. and Dr. Harriet Dustin, M.D.	December 21, 1976
423	Lesbian Mothers and Child Custody. Part 1	attorneys Margo Hagaman and Barbara Handschu	January 18, 1977
424	Lesbian Mothers and Child Custody. Part 2	couple Ann Foreman and Mary Jo Risher	January 12, 1977
425	Legislative Report Update	activist Carol Burris and lobbyist Susan Tenenbaum	February 18, 1977
426	Pregnancy After 35	Alice Rothchild, M.D. and author Carole Spearin McCauley	February 17, 1977
427	Teen Pregnancy	Georgia McMurray and nurse specialist Barbara Wallace-Catalano	February 28, 1977
428	Women's Astrology	Astrologer Tiffany Holmes	January 25, 1977
429	Women and Age, Part 1: Age is a Woman's Issue	Tish Sommers	January 28, 1977
430	Women and Age, Part 2: Age is Money Blues	Tish Sommers and Laurie Shields (National Coordinator of the Alliance for Displaced Homemakers)	January 28, 1977
431	Women and Age, Part 3: Age is Becoming	Tish Sommers, Lydia Braggar, and Marjorie Collins	January 28, 1977
432	DES and DES Daughters. Part 1	Health researcher Kay Weiss	February 24, 1977
433	DES and DES Daughters. Part 2	Health researcher Kay Weiss	February 24, 1977
434	International Tribunals on Crimes Against Women	Diana Russell and Judith Friedlander	February 28, 1977
435	A Conversation with Robin Morgan	Writer Robin Morgan	March 15, 1977
436			
437	A Conversation with Lotte Jacobi	Photographer Lotte Jacobi	March 28, 1977
438	Northern Irish Question: Another View		March 31, 1977
439	The Great Pretenders: The New Foods	Writer and natural foods advocate Beatrice Trum Hunter	April 4, 1977
440	Pornography	Loretta Darling (Citizens for a Decent Community), feminist writer Susan Brownmiller, and psychologist Anke Ehrhardt	April 14, 1977
441	Sexual Harassment on the Job	Karen Sauvigne and Susan Meyer	March 24, 1977
442	Concerns of American Indian Women	Connie Uri, M.D. and Marie Sanchez	April 15, 1977
443	Women and Success	Dr. Adeline Levine	May 19, 1977
444	Alternatives to Estrogen	Gideon Seaman, M.D. and Barbara Seaman	May 5, 1977
