= T. O'Conor Sloane III =

Thomas O’Conor Sloane III (November 20, 1912 – March 13, 2003) was an American editor, professor, etymologist and career military officer.

== Author collaborations at Doubleday and Devin-Adair ==
Sloane, a senior editor at Doubleday in New York City, New York collaborated with such distinguished talents as Salvador Dalí, Thor Heyerdahl, Jacques Cousteau and his son, Philippe Cousteau, Marc Chagall, Hugo and Nebula Award winner Isaac Asimov, Marcel Marceau, Edward Steichen, Leon Uris, Pulitzer Prize winner Bruce Catton, General Matthew Bunker Ridgway, Emmy Award winner Allan W. Eckert, Austin Clarke, Edward Plunkett, 18th Baron of Dunsany (Lord Dunsany), Owen Lee, JK Stanford, Joseph T. Durkin, Charles C. Tansill, Selden Rodman, Elizabeth Bentley, George Teeple Eggleston, John M. Oesterreicher, Peter Kavanagh, Oppi Untracht, Philippe Diole, Jack Ganzhorn, Leonard Wickenden, Mario Pei, Seon Manley, Anne Fremantle and many others, during his four decades as an editor at Doubleday, Devin-Adair and other publishing houses.

== A partial list of editorial works at Doubleday ==
=== Authors and titles ===
Steichen

Sloane was the editor of A Life in Photography (Doubleday, 1963) by Edward Steichen. Detailed correspondence between Steichen and Sloane chronicling the production of the book is located in the Edward Steichen Archive (Series VI. Post-MoMA Exhibitions, Publications, and Anniversaries; Subseries VI.A. A Life in Photography; VI.A.2 "Correspondence with Doubleday etc." and the Grace M. Mayer Papers (Series III.E) of the Museum of Modern Art (MoMA) in New York City.

Asimov

Sloane initiated and was the editor of Asimov's Biographical Encyclopedia of Science and Technology (Doubleday, 1964) by Isaac Asimov. Asimov, in his second and third volumes of autobiography, In Joy Still Felt: The Autobiography of Isaac Asimov, 1954-1978 (Avon Books & Doubleday, 1980) and I. Asimov: A Memoir (Doubleday, 1994), as well as in his Opus titles, describes the details of Sloane's idea for the book, the decision to put Asimov's name in the title and their excitement at the book's success. Interestingly, Asimov's first published work of science fiction had been accepted by Amazing Stories, the magazine that Sloane's grandfather, Dr. T. O'Conor Sloane had once been the editor of. Sloane and Asimov had a productive working relationship that spanned a decade, as detailed in In Joy Still Felt: The Autobiography of Isaac Asimov, 1954-1978 (Avon Books & Doubleday, 1980), although Sloane did ultimately decline to be the editor of Asimov's Guide to the Bible (Doubleday, 1968).

Dalí

Sloane was the editor of Salvador Dalí's autobiographical Diary of a Genius (Doubleday, 1965), which stands as one of the seminal texts of Surrealism, by the best-known artist of what is widely considered to be the 20th century's most influential art movement. As evidenced in part by a letter from Dalí to Sloane, dated July 22, 1965, regarding the promotional efforts by Doubleday for Diary of a Genius, Dalí was not happy and in a subsequent luncheon with Sloane, Dalí threw potato chips in his face.

Manley

Sloane was the editor of Long Island Discovery: An Adventure Into the History, Manners, and Mores of America's Front Porch (Doubleday, 1966) by Seon Manley.

Untracht

Sloane edited books on metal craft and jewelry with Finnish artist, Oppi Untracht, and his wife, Saara, such as Metal Techniques for Craftsmen : A Basic Manual for Craftsmen on the Methods of Forming and Decorating Metals (Doubleday, 1968) and initiated Jewelry Concepts and Technology (Doubleday, 1982).

Cousteau

Sloane was the editor of Jacques Cousteau's first two books with Doubleday: The Shark: Splendid Savage of the Sea (The Undersea Discoveries of Jacques-Yves Cousteau) (Doubleday, 1970) by Jacques and Philippe Cousteau and Life and Death in a Coral Sea (Doubleday, 1971) by Jacques Cousteau and Philippe Diole.

Heyerdahl

Sloane was the editor of The Art Of Easter Island (Doubleday, 1975) by Thor Heyerdahl.

Sloane's editorial work ranged widely, titles included Designs for Craftsmen: textiles, graphics, ceramics, wood, glass, metal, leather, and many other crafts (Doubleday, 1962) by Walter Miles; Georgetown University: First in the Nation's Capital (Doubleday, 1964) by Joseph T. Durkin; Michigan (Doubleday, 1967) by John Calkins; The Skin Diver's Bible (Doubleday, 1968) by Owen Lee; The Boatbuilders of Bristol (Doubleday, 1970) by Samuel Carter III; The Owls of North America (Doubleday, 1974) by Allan W. Eckert; The Illustrated Encyclopedia of Crafts and How to Master Them (Doubleday, 1978) by Grace Berne Rose with drawings by Marta Cone and a popular series of travel-inspired books of photography by Hans W. Hannau, titles included California (Doubleday, 1964), Yosemite (Doubleday, 1967), Martinique (Doubleday, 1967), California in Color (Doubleday, 1969), Bermuda in full color (Doubleday, 1970), The Bahama Islands in full color (Doubleday, 1974); and many more titles by various authors.

Additionally, Sloane facilitated the publication of the book Fabrics for Interiors: A Guide for Architects, Designers, and Consumers (Van Nostrand Reinhold, 1975) by Jack Lenor Larsen and Jeanne Weeks, by authorizing the release of drawings from Elements of Weaving (Doubleday, 1967) by Azalea Stuart Thorpe and Jack Larsen to the authors and their publishing house.

== Doubleday Dictionary ==
Sloane was involved in the development and publication of the first Doubleday dictionary.

== Before Doubleday ==
Sloane entered the publishing world in 1938, serving as an associate editor, then editor, with Liveright Publishing from 1938 to 1940, as associate editor at E. P. Dutton from 1940 to 1942 and again in 1946, Declan X. McMullen Co., from 1947 to 1948 and then as director and editor at the Devin-Adair Publishing Company from 1949 to 1960, when he joined Doubleday as a senior editor. Doubleday had become the largest publishing house in the United States by 1947.

Sloane freelanced Desert Calling: The Story of Charles de Foucauld (Henry Holt, 1949) by Anne Fremantle.

== The Devin-Adair Publishing Company ==
Sloane served as director and editor at the Devin-Adair Publishing Company from 1949 to 1960, a conservative publishing house located in NYC and later, Old Greenwich, Connecticut.

== A partial list of editorial works at Devin-Adair ==
=== Authors and titles ===
Kavanagh

Sloane was the editor of The Story of the Abbey Theatre: From Its Origins in 1899 to the Present (Devin-Adair, 1950) by Peter Kavanagh, which Sean O’Casey, reviewing for The New York Times, stated was "the best book written on the subject." (Note: Interesting vignettes about Sloane, Kavanagh and Barrell can be found in Roger Kovach's June 2007 Good Stories blog piece, "Parties at the Janice Studios.")

Hughes

Sloane was the editor of Prejudice and the Press (Devin-Adair, 1950) by Frank Hughes.

Oesterreicher

Sloane was the editor of Walls Are Crumbling: Seven Jewish Philosophers Discover Christ (Devin-Adair, 1952) by John M. Oesterreicher.

Eggleston

Sloane was the editor of Tahiti, Voyage Through Paradise: The Story of a Small Boat Passage Through the Society Islands (Devin-Adair, 1953) by George Teeple Eggleston.

Stanford

Sloane was the editor of Last Chukker (Devin-Adair, 1954) by JK Stanford.

Plunkett

Sloane was the editor of The Sword of Welleran, and Other Tales of Enchantment (Devin-Adair, 1954) by Edward Plunkett, with line drawings by Robert Barrell. (Note: Interesting vignettes about Sloane, Kavanagh and Barrell can be found in Roger Kovach's June 2007 Good Stories blog piece, "Parties at the Janice Studios.")

Rodman

Sloane was the editor of two books by Selden Rodman, The Eye of Man: Form and Content in Western Painting (Devin-Adair, 1955) and Mexican Journal: The Conquerors Conquered (Devin-Adair, 1958).

Wickenden

Sloane was the editor of Our Daily Poison (Devin-Adair, 1955) by chemist and organic farmer Leonard Wickenden. The book — published seven years before Rachel Carson's Silent Spring, which launched the modern environmental movement — proclaimed the dangers of the use of insecticides and other chemicals on human health and the environment.

Tansill

Sloane was the editor of America and the Fight for Irish Freedom: 1866-1922 (Devin-Adair, 1957) by Charles C. Tansill.

Pei

Devin-Adair published several of Italian-born American linguist Mario Pei's many books, with Sloane as the editor; including: One Language for the World and How To Achieve It (Devin-Adair, 1958), a copy of which was given to the leader of every nation in the world.

Ganzhorn

Sloane was the editor of I've Killed Men: An Epic of Early Arizona (Devin-Adair, 1959) by John W. "Jack" Ganzhorn.

Clarke

Sloane was the editor of work by Irish poet Austin Clarke, regarded as one of the leading poets in the generation after Yeats.

== Elizabeth Bentley, Devin-Adair and the FBI ==
While at Devin-Adair, Sloane was the editor of Out of Bondage: The Story of Elizabeth Bentley (Devin-Adair, 1951) by Elizabeth Bentley, an American Communist and Soviet spy turned American spy and FBI informant. Sloane and Devin Garrity, the president of Devin-Adair, became embroiled in an FBI investigation involving possible contact at the Devin-Adair offices between Elizabeth Bentley, who visited the offices frequently and American Communist turned FBI informant Harvey Matusow who had visited the offices several times, meeting with Sloane in an attempt to interest Devin-Adair in publishing a book.

Additionally, Kathryn S. Olmsted uses Civil Intelligence Report: T. O'Conor Sloane, III, January 22, 1951, Rauh Papers contained in the Library of Congress in Washington, D.C., as a resource for her book Red Spy Queen: A Biography of Elizabeth Bentley (University of North Carolina Press, 2002).

== Catholic Poetry Society of America and other literary endeavors ==
From 1947 to 1952, Sloane was a director of the Catholic Poetry Society of America, which was headquartered in New York City with chapters in many major cities across the United States and published Spirit, a magazine of poetry, as well as books of selected poetry from the magazine, such as From the Four Winds: Selected Poems from "Spirit" (Idlewild Press, 1939). During this time, a fellow director was Joseph Tusiani who would eventually become the New York State Poet Laureate Emeritus. A well-known president of the organization was A. M. Sullivan. Sloane and Sullivan were also both members of The Craftsman Group for Poetry, a New York City poetry society. Correspondence between Sloane and Sullivan is archived in the A. M. Sullivan Papers at Syracuse University.

=== Book reviews, poetry reviews and literary criticism ===
Sloane wrote many book reviews for Commonweal, these included For All Mankind by Leon Blum, Wide Margins by George Palmer Putnam, Grey Eminence by Aldous Huxley and Return to the Future by Sigrid Undset; poetry reviews for the Catholic Poetry Society of America's SPIRIT magazine; and provided literary criticism for America: A Catholic Review of the Week.

=== After retirement ===
In retirement, Sloane continued to read the occasional manuscript in preparation for publication, such as The Final Fortress: The Campaign for Vicksburg 1862-1863 (St. Martin's Press, 1980) by Samuel Carter III and An American Experience of God: The Spirituality of Isaac Hecker (Paulist Press, 1981) by John Farina. He was also known to be a ready source of entertaining anecdotes about the life of an editor, such as the story (Note: Quoted in references 102 & 103.) about his friend Robert Giroux that appeared in The Literary Life and Other Curiosities (Viking Press, 1981) by Robert Hendrickson.

== Etymological work ==
Sloane was the etymologist for the International Dictionary of Medicine and Biology (Wiley, 1986) which he worked on for approximately three years during the late 1970s to early 1980s after his retirement from Doubleday. The dictionary was a major project, one which the journal Annals of Internal Medicine referred to as being "a new medical dictionary on a scale and scope never seen before in English...."

Sloane provided the etymologies for Churchill's Illustrated Medical Dictionary (Churchill Livingstone, 1989).

== Teaching ==
=== Hunter College ===
Sloane joined the faculty of Hunter College in New York City in 1956 and taught book editing and publishing, copy editing and creative writing until his retirement in late 1977.

=== Fairfield University ===
He also taught at Fairfield University in Fairfield, Connecticut and was a member of the graduate advisory board of the Center for the Advancement of Human Communication, serving on the graduate advisory committee of the Graduate School of Corporate and Political Communication at Fairfield University well into his retirement years.

== Life ==
Sloane was born in South Orange, New Jersey, son of the photographer T. O'Conor Sloane, Jr. and Gertrude Larned Sloane, author of Fun with Folk Tales: Six Plays in Verse with Music and Songs (E.P. Dutton, 1942). His grandfather was Dr. T. O'Conor Sloane, a scientist, author, professor, inventor and the editor of Scientific American and Amazing Stories. Sloane was a 1931 graduate of Regis High School on Manhattan's Upper East Side and attended Fordham University in The Bronx, from 1932 to 1937. Sloane retired from Doubleday in November 1977 at 65 years of age. He was a resident of Westport, Connecticut for 72 years.

=== Engagement to the future 5th Marquise de la Gratitud: The Giroux Imbroglio ===
Shortly before the entrance of the United States into World War II, Sloane was engaged to be married in June 1941 to Doña Carmen de Arango of New York and Havana, Cuba, daughter of the Marques and Marquesa de la Gratitud, who became the 5th Marquise de la Gratitud (see also, Spanish nobility in Cuba). Doña de Arango left Sloane for Robert Giroux, (Note: See the Robert Giroux Wikipedia article for more on this.) of Farrar, Straus and Giroux, his friend since Regis High School; before Sloane, Doña de Arango had been engaged to Don Julio Lafitte, Count de Lugar Nuevo.

=== Marriage during WWII ===
Sloane met and married his future wife of 59 years, Ella Margaret Sloane, née Lunder of Canton, South Dakota while stationed in England during World War II, she as a nurse with the American Red Cross and he, as an intelligence officer, a Captain in the United States Army Air Corps; they had three children, Thomas Lunder, Catherine Maria and Juliana Margaret. Mrs. Sloane had graduated in the top of her class from St. Olaf College, in Northfield, Minnesota, where she sang in the St. Olaf Choir. She stood nearly as tall as her 6' husband, sang opera semi-professionally and hailed from a pioneer Norwegian-American farming family involved in South Dakota politics; her brother, Lafe A. Lunder, was a four-term Republican state senator representing the 6th District in the 30th through 33rd sessions of the state Senate. Mrs. Sloane had taught high school English for several years before joining the Red Cross to assist in the war effort. In the late 1950s, she became director of the New Canaan Cooperative Nursery School and remained in that position for 20 years until her retirement.

=== Military service after WWII ===
After the war, Sloane continued military service as a reservist, achieving the rank of Lt. Colonel by the late 1950s and eventually retiring from the U.S. Air Force Reserve, he was buried with full military honors.

== Of interest ==
=== Historical ===
Sloane, a direct descendant of the O'Conors of Connaught, Ireland, held a lifelong interest in both Irish and American history, politics and literature; his editorial work at Devin-Adair in particular, reflected this. He believed that to be erudite in one's family history and heritage informed professional endeavors and contributions to society, cultural sensibilities, military service and civic responsibilities, political views, and religious faith. His grandmother, Isabel Mitchel Sloane, was the daughter of Jane Mitchel, née Verner and John Mitchel, the Irish patriot, political writer, newspaper editor and publisher, and the author of several books, including the Jail Journal (Cameron, Ferguson & Company, 1880); as well, she was the aunt of John Purroy Mitchel, the 95th mayor of New York City from 1914 to 1917. Sloane's uncle, John Eyre Sloane, married Thomas Edison's daughter Madeleine. He was also a descendant of Auguste Chouteau, the founder of St. Louis, Missouri and his great-great uncle was Charles O'Conor of New York City, a lawyer who battled "Boss" Tweed and Tammany Hall and was the first Catholic presidential nominee, a Bourbon Democrat, on the Straight-Out Democratic Party ticket with John Quincy Adams II in the 1872 United States presidential election.

Sloane's grandson is Justin T. O'Conor Sloane, an author, publisher and the editor of Worlds of IF magazine and Galaxy Science Fiction magazine.

=== Literary Correspondence ===
Sloane corresponded with many notable figures during his editorial tenure at Doubleday and Devin-Adair, some of which is preserved in the archival collections of Georgia O'Keeffe, A. M. Sullivan, James Rorty, Selden Rodman, Edward Steichen, Robert Payne, Max Eastman, Parker Tyler, Leah Brenner, Harry Sylvester, Austin Clarke, Otto Grossman, Frank Hughes, Mary Kennedy, Edward C. McAleer, and others.

One of Sloane's editorial projects at Doubleday involved a request to the international law firm of Sullivan and Cromwell to examine the papers of former CIA director Allen Dulles concerning the Bay of Pigs Invasion, his letter caught the attention of the CIA and is archived in the National Archives Building, in College Park, Maryland.
