= Paul Yates =

Paul Yates may refer to:

- Paul Sanchez IV, American filmmaker, also known as Paul Yates
- Paul Yates (artist) (born 1954), British poet
