= A. M. Sullivan =

A. M. Sullivan may refer to:

- Alexander Martin Sullivan (1829–1884), Irish journalist, politician, and author
- A. M. Sullivan (barrister) (1871–1959), Irish lawyer, son of Alexander Martin Sullivan
- Aloysius Michael Sullivan (1896–1980), American poet
