= Burusho =

Burusho may refer to:

- Burusho people, an ethnic group in Pakistan
- Burusho language or Burushaski, spoken by the Burusho people
- Burusho cuisine, cuisine associated with Burusho people
