= Chitrali cuisine =

Food and cuisine of the Chitrali people

Chitrali cuisine (Urdu: چترالی پکوان) is the cuisine of the Kho people (also known as Chitralis) and who are native to northern Pakistan, and is based on wheat flour, vegetables, milk and meat.

Chitrali food has a regional variance in contrast to many other cuisines of Pakistan. The food of Chitral is very similar to the cuisine in neighboring Gilgit-Baltistan.

Salty buttered tea is popular in Chitral, as are green tea and very bitter black tea called troq chai (bitter tea). Honey, cheese and fresh fruits are also staples of the Chitrali diet, as these products are part of the local mountain agricultural tradition. The influence of Punjab is seen in the popularity of lamb and chicken karahi. Uzbek dumplings or mantu are also very popular. Pilaf, usually of beef which is preboiled until it is extremely tender, is an essential dish at large gatherings; the meat is served lying on top of the rice. Dried apricots (chambor) and dried mulberries (kitori) are both an important part of the local diet and are also exported to other parts of Pakistan, Afghanistan and Arab states of the Persian Gulf.

== Breads ==
Paratha: A flatbread made with whole wheat flour and is unleavened. Parathas are fried on a tawa, a stone frying pan, using butter or cooking oil. It is often eaten for breakfast in Chitral.

Tikki: A thick leavened loaf baked over coals in a special mold. Because of its hard crust it can be stored for weeks. It is popularly eaten at breakfast or in the afternoon.

Khesta: A bread made from a liquid batter which has been allowed to ferment and is cooked on a griddle. It has a slightly sour taste and a spongy texture.

Phulka: The standard South Asian chapatti.

Rishiki: Thin pancakes or crepes made of a batter consisting of whole wheat flour, water and eggs. They can be either savoury or sweet. Sweet rishiki is served with honey and cottage cheese.

== Dry meat dishes ==
Rondijhzu: Barbecued or spit roasted goat or lamb seasoned with only salt.

Taaw kahak: Chicken which is roasted on a griddle with additional pressure applied, usually by placing a rock or heavy pot over it. It is dry and crispy.

Taaw machhi: Fish cooked in the same pressure grilling method as taaw kahak, especially brown trout, rainbow trout and schizothorax.

== Soups ==
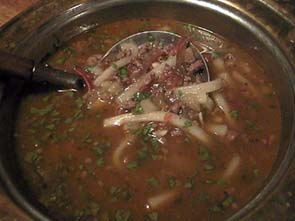
A Chitrali noodle soup.

One of the most important elements in Chitrali cuisine is the importance of soups, usually eaten as the main dish accompanied by bread and fruit. The cold climate of Chitral is one of the factors contributing to the popularity of soups in Chitrali cuisine.

Kalli: A noodle soup made with minced beef and hand-cut whole wheat noodles. It is very similar to the Central Asian laghman and is probably of Chinese origin.

Leganu: Made with tiny lentil-flour dumplings and unlike most Chitrali cuisine it is often quite spicy.

Lajhaik: Similar to the Kashmiri hareesa, it is a thick soup of whole wheat and barley grains slowly stewed together with lamb, beef or duck.

Khhamalogh: A soup consisting of the skulls of sheep, goats or cattle crushed and slowly simmered for many hours.

Kawirogh: A light soup made with dried wild capers and meat. Very popular in the summer as it is supposed to have a cooling and blood-thinning effect.

== Indigenous dishes ==
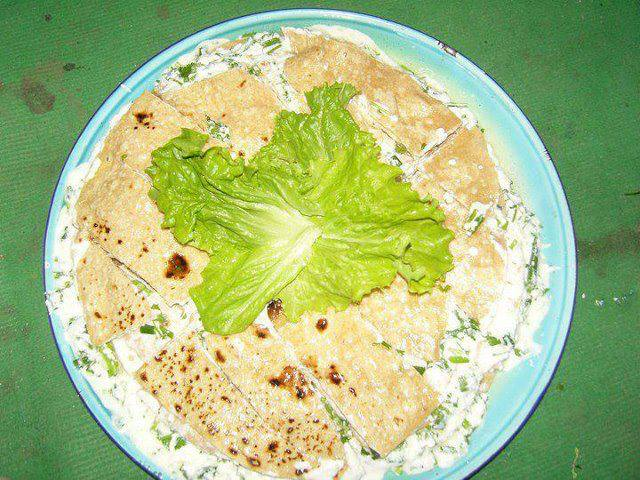
Ghalmandi with cottage cheese and herbs

Ghalmandi: A dish of layered flat breads with a filling of cottage cheese, coriander and chives and covered in melted butter and walnut oil.

Cheer aa shapik: Similar to ghalmandi, but with a white sauce, similar to bechamel, replacing the cottage cheese.

Qalaibat: A dish made by cooking whole wheat flour with lamb fat.

Shroshrp: A type of unsweetened halwa made from germinated wheat grain flour.

Pushur tikki: A loaf of tikki bread baked with a mince meat filling, a type of meat pie. Other variations include phhenak tikki, which is filled with cottage cheese, and pandir tikki, filled with matured cheese. A vegetarian version with a spinach filling is shaakh mujhzi.

== See also ==
- Burusho cuisine
- Balti cuisine
