= 1963 Pulitzer Prize =

Awards for journalism and related fields

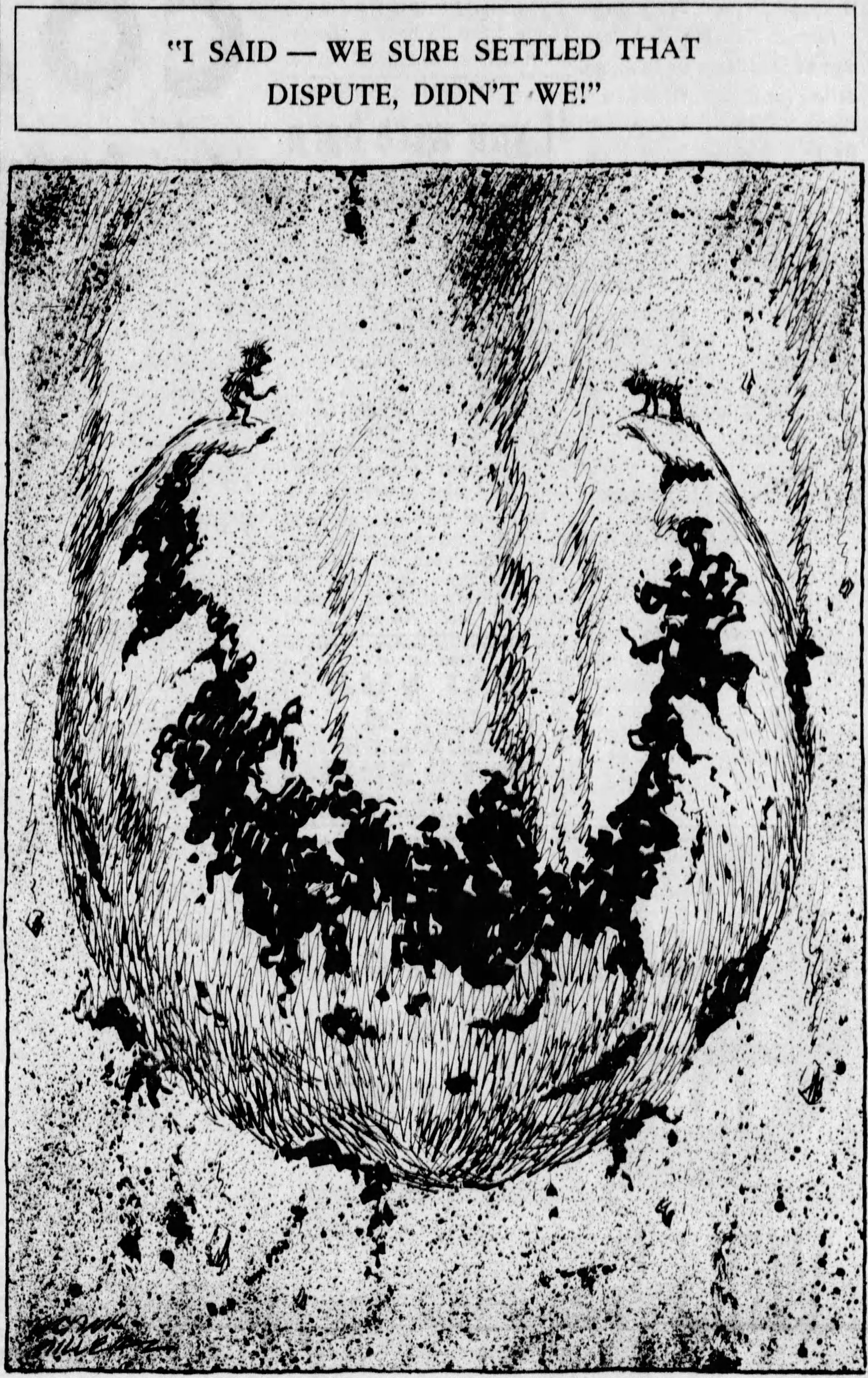
The prize-winning editorial cartoon, "I said—We sure settled that dispute, didn't we!"

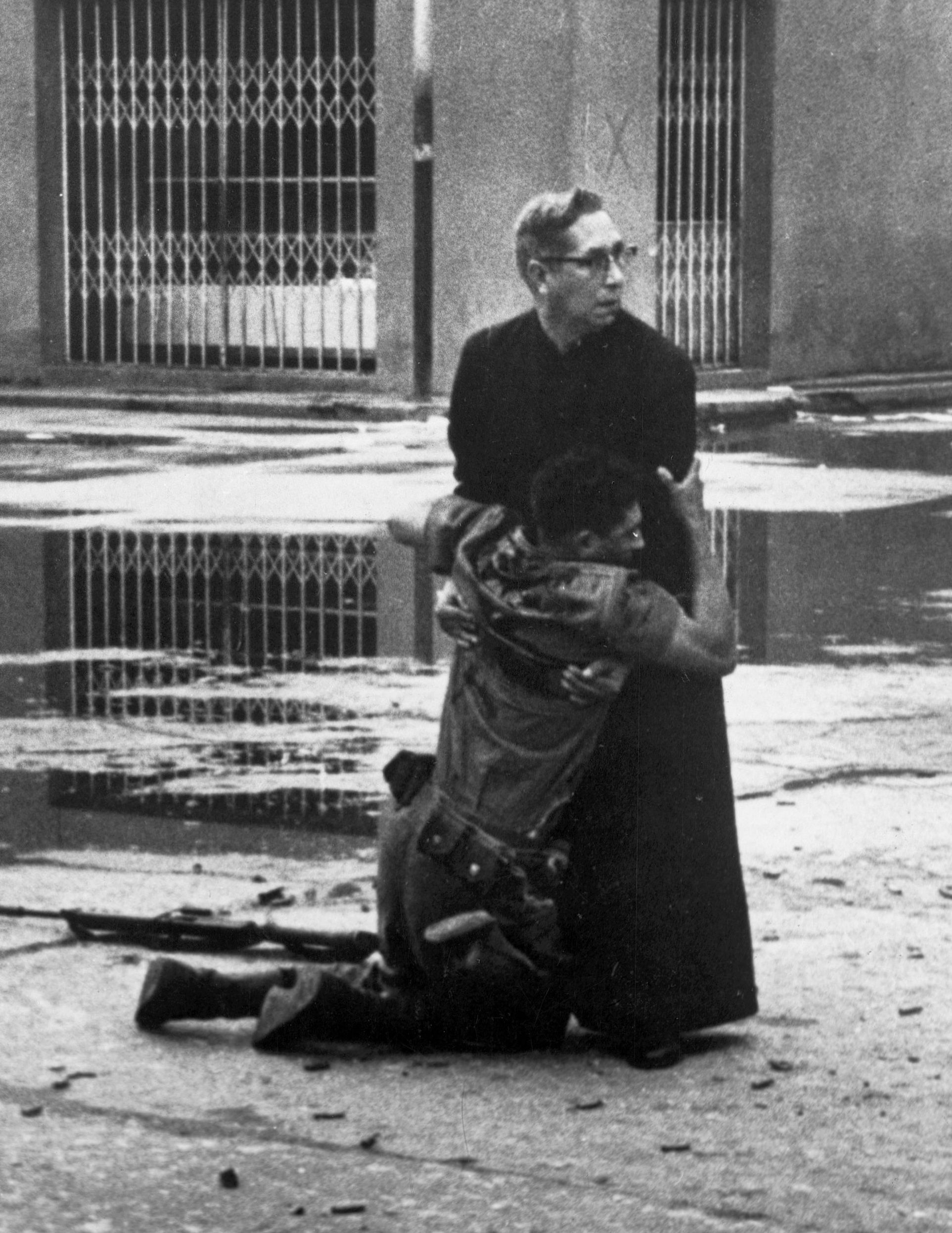
The prize-winning photograph, "Aid from the Padre"

The following are the Pulitzer Prizes for 1963.

== Journalism awards ==
- Public Service:
  - The Chicago Daily News, for calling public attention to the issue of providing birth control services in the public health programs in its area.
- Local Reporting, Edition Time:
  - Sylvan Fox, Anthony Shannon and William Longgood of the New York World-Telegram and The Sun, for their reporting of an air crash in Jamaica Bay, killing 95 persons on March 1, 1962.
- Local Reporting, No Edition Time:
  - Oscar Griffin, Jr. of the Pecos Independent and Enterprise, who as editor initiated the exposure of the Billie Sol Estes scandal and thereby brought a major fraud on the United States government to national attention with resultant investigation, prosecution and conviction of Estes.
- National Reporting:
  - Anthony Lewis of The New York Times, for his distinguished reporting of the proceedings of the United States Supreme Court during the year, with particular emphasis on the coverage of the decision in the reapportionment case and its consequences in many of the States of the Union.
- International Reporting:
  - Hal Hendrix of The Miami News, for his persistent reporting which revealed, at an early stage, that the Soviet Union was installing missile launching pads in Cuba and sending in large numbers of MIG-21 aircraft.
- Editorial Writing:
  - Ira B. Harkey Jr. editor and publisher of the Pascagoula Chronicle, for his courageous editorials devoted to the processes of law and reason during the integration crisis in Mississippi in 1962.
- Editorial Cartooning:
  - Frank Miller of the Des Moines Register, for a cartoon which showed a world destroyed with one ragged figure calling to another: "I said—We sure settled that dispute, didn't we!"
- Photography:
  - Hector Rondon, photographer of Caracas, for the Venezuelan newspaper, La Republica, for his remarkable picture of a priest holding a wounded soldier in the 1962 El Porteñazo insurrection in Venezuela: "Aid From The Padre". The photograph was distributed by the Associated Press.

== Letters, Drama and Music Awards ==
- Fiction:
  - The Reivers by William Faulkner (Random)
- History:
  - Washington, Village and Capital, 1800-1878 by Constance McLaughlin Green (Princeton Univ. Press).
- Biography or Autobiography:
  - Henry James by Leon Edel (Lippincott).
- Poetry:
  - Pictures from Brueghel by William Carlos Williams (New Directions).
- General Nonfiction:
  - The Guns of August by Barbara Tuchman (Macmillan).
- Drama:
  - No award given. The advisory committee deemed the play chosen by the drama jury (Who's Afraid of Virginia Woolf? by Edward Albee) to be unacceptable.
- Music:
  - Piano Concerto No. 1 by Samuel Barber (Schirmer)
    Premiered with the Boston Symphony at Philharmonic Hall on September 24, 1962.
