= Alfred W. McCann =

American journalist

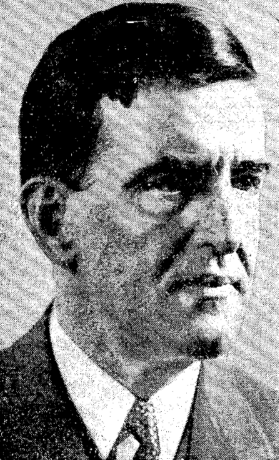
- Born: January 9, 1879; Pittsburgh
- Died: January 19, 1931 (aged 52); New York City
- Occupations: Journalist, radio commentator
- Relatives: Peter Cullen (grandson)

Alfred Watterson McCann (January 9, 1879 – January 19, 1931) was an American muckraking journalist, radio commentator and natural foods campaigner. His views on food were dismissed by historians and medical experts as quackery. He was the maternal grandfather of voice actor Peter Cullen.

== Biography ==
McCann was born in Pittsburgh. He was educated at University of Chicago and graduated in 1899 from Duquesne University. After graduation he taught English and mathematics. He married Mary Carmody in 1905, they had five children. In 1922, Fordham University awarded McCann an honorary doctorate of law.

McCann hosted the "Pure Food Hour" on the WOR radio station in the 1920s to expose practices of the American food industry. His son Alfred McCann Jr. took over for WOR radio after his death in 1931. His son died in 1972. McCann was the maternal grandfather of voice actor Peter Cullen

McCann died on January 19, 1931, in his apartment at the Park Royal Hotel, New York City. McCann gave an hour long radio broadcast on the dangers of acidosis. After he had gone off air, he died from a heart attack.

== God – or Gorilla ==
McCann was a Catholic and creationist, he authored the anti-evolution book God – or Gorilla in 1922. The book was notable for attacking paleontologist Henry Fairfield Osborn. McCann argued that there is no evidence for common descent and denounced the "ape-man hoax".

McCann cited an alleged "Triassic shoe sole fossil" which he used as evidence that humans were walking around with shoes in the Triassic period. Science writer Martin Gardner noted that the photograph "shows what is obviously a common type of rock concretion" and geologists do not take McCann's claim seriously. McCann's book was criticized for plagiarizing material from Jesuit Erich Wasmann. Atheist author Woolsey Teller wrote a rebuttal to McCann.

Reception from the creationist community was mixed. Creationist Arthur Isaac Brown supported the book, stating it offered "the most scathing and unanswerable indictment ever published against this untenable hypothesis." However, Catholic creationist Barry O'Toole criticized McCann for utilizing inaccurate arguments. O'Toole described the book as a "reprehensible, extreme of biased antagonism, that is neither fair in method nor conciliatory in tone." O'Toole noted that one of McCann's illustrations made the mistake of confusing the skeleton of an orangutan with a chimpanzee. Hay Watson Smith a Presbyterian minister and theistic evolutionist commented that McCann and other creationists have "no standing whatever as scientists."

== Natural foods campaigner ==
McCann has been described as an "anti-white bread crusader", "food faddist" and "pure foods reformer." He campaigned against chemical bleaching and artificial whitening of bread. He linked the consumption of white bread and bleached white flour with disease. He believed that processed and refined foods poison people. He urged people to lower their consumption of meat and avoid white flour and refined sugar which he linked to cancer and heart attacks. Similar to John Harvey Kellogg, he promoted the consumption of bran in the diet.

McCann argued that white flour "was the product of greedy industrialists and violated "the provisions of the Creator". Historian Aaron Bobrow-Strain has noted that McCann espoused a combination of "Christian fundamentalist, white supremacy, and populist trust-busting". For example, McCann commented that unless "the white races of all lands" return to a Godly diet of whole grains they would face "race suicide on a colossal scale".

In 1912, The New York Globe printed McCann's first article on the pure food movement. He wrote for the Globe for the next ten years making "frightening libels and wild statements" about food. The Globe gave McCann a laboratory to perform food tests and hired a team of lawyers to defend him from defamation suits. Because of his controversial articles, he spent much time in court. McCann attacked publicly the makers of what he conceived as dangerous or inferior foods. In 1923 after the Globe folded, he became director of the Alfred W. McCann Laboratories in New York City. He was influenced by Harvey W. Wiley and crusaded for "pure food".

McCann promoted pseudoscientific views about acidosis. He claimed that Americans were suffering from an alleged acid overdose from improperly combined carbohydrates, proteins and processed foods. He stated that acidosis was the cause of "kidneycide" and heart attacks. McCann was not a vegetarian. He advocated the slaughter of all cattle to reduce the price of grain. He endorsed a low-protein diet. He argued that 60 grams of protein a day is all that is needed and 80 grams is dangerous to health. McCann's articles appeared in many newspapers. He also argued against the use of distilled water.

Food historian Harvey Levenstein has commented that McCann was a "pure food crusader and unabashed quack." Historian of medicine James C. Whorton has described McCann as "America's most vociferous antagonist of processed foods."

== Selected publications ==
- Starving America (1912)
- Vital Questions and Answers Concerning 15,000,000 Physically Defective Children (1913)
- Thirty Cent Bread: How to Escape a Higher Cost of Living (1917)
- The Science of Eating (1919)
- Pasteur and God (1920)
- God — or Gorilla (1922)
- The Science of Keeping Young (1926)
- Greatest of Men: Washington (1927)

== See also ==
- Beatrice Trum Hunter
- The Pure Foods Movement
