= Death of a Whale =

1954 poem by John Blight

- by John Blight
- Country: Australia
- Language: English
- Publisher: The Bulletin, 7 April 1954
- Publication date: 1954
- Lines: 14

"Death of a Whale" is a poem by Australian poet John Blight.

It was first published in The Bulletin magazine on 7 April 1954 and later in two of the author's poetry collections and a number of other Australian poetry anthologies.

== Outline ==
The poem compares the death of a whale on reef with that of a mouse and wonders if the level of human compassion is determined by the size and/or proximity of a dead animal. Are those that go to see the whale carcase drawn by idle curiosity of a spectacle, or by grief?

== Critical reception ==
In his commentary on the poem in 60 Classic Australian Poems Geoff Page noted "like most good poems, Blight's sonnet raises more questions than it answers..there is little doubt that 'Death of a Whale' is a masterful sonnet"

== Further publications ==
After its initial publication in The Bulletin in 1954 the poem was reprinted as follows:

- Australian Poetry 1954 edited by Ronald McCuaig, Angus and Robertson, 1954
- The Penguin Book of Australian Verse edited by John Thompson, Kenneth Slessor and R. G. Howarth, Penguin Books, 1958
- A Beachcomber's Diary : Ninety Sea Sonnets by John Blight, Angus and Robertson, 1963
- The Penguin Book of Australian Verse edited by Harry Heseltine, Penguin Books, 1972
- Australian Verse from 1805 : A Continuum edited by Geoffrey Dutton, Rigby, 1976
- Selected Poems 1939–1975 by John Blight, Nelson, 1976
- What's Yours? : An Anthology of Australian Poetry edited by Alvie Egan, Victorian Foundation on Alcoholism & Drug Dependence, 1977
- The Collins Book of Australian Poetry edited by Rodney Hall, Collins, 1981
- Cross-Country : A Book of Australian Verse edited by John Barnes and Brian MacFarlane, Heinemann, 1984
- The Illustrated Treasury of Australian Verse edited by Beatrice Davis, Nelson, 1984
- Two Centuries of Australian Poetry edited by Mark O’Connor, Oxford University Press, 1988
- The Penguin Book of Modern Australian Poetry edited by John Tranter and Philip Mead, Penguin, 1991
- Selected Poems 1939-1990 by John Blight, University of Queensland Press, 1992
- 50 Years of Queensland Poetry : 1940s to 1990s edited by Philip Neilsen and Helen Horton, Central Queensland University Press, 1998
- The Indigo Book of Modern Australian Sonnets edited by Geoff Page, Indigo, 2003
- 100 Australian Poems You Need to Know edited by Jamie Grant, Hardie Grant, 2008
- 60 Classic Australian Poems edited by Geoff Page, University of NSW Press, 2009
- Australian Poetry Since 1788 edited by Geoffrey Lehmann and Robert Gray, University of NSW Press, 2011

The poem was also translated into Indonesian in 1991.

== See also ==
- 1954 in poetry
- 1954 in literature
- 1954 in Australian literature
- Australian literature
