= Beatrice Trum Hunter =

American Natural foods campaigner and writer

- Born: December 16, 1918; Brooklyn
- Died: May 17, 2017 (aged 98); Hillsborough, New Hampshire
- Occupations: Natural foods campaigner, writer

Beatrice Josephine Trum Hunter (December 16, 1918 – May 17, 2017) was an American natural foods campaigner and writer.

== Biography ==
Hunter was born on December 16, 1918, in Brooklyn to Gabriel Trum, who worked as a silk cutter in a dyeing plant, and the former Martha Engle. Hunter had one older sibling, Jeanette Trum Granoff who died in 2009. Hunter was educated at Richmond Hill High School in Queens and graduated from Brooklyn College in 1940 with a B.A. in English literature. She obtained an M.A. from Teachers College, Columbia University. She worked as a public school teacher in New York and New Jersey.

Hunter was married to John Hunter, the son of photographer, Lotte Jacobi; they divorced in 1977. She resided in a farmhouse with 78 acres (32 ha) of land in Deering, New Hampshire. Her house was heated by a wood-burning stove. Her passion for natural foods developed after reading the book 100,000,000 Guinea Pigs.

Hunter was food editor of Consumers' Research Bulletin magazine. She authored The Natural Foods Cookbook in 1961. This was one of the first works published on natural foods, a decade before the natural foods movement was popularized in the United States. Hunter warned against the consumption of artificial additives, processed foods and preservatives, excessive sugar and the dangers of pesticides. Hunter was one of the earliest opponents of pesticides. She sent some of her research to Rachel Carson, author of Silent Spring.

Hunter's book Food Additives and Federal Policy: The Mirage of Safety explores the hazards and implications of chemical additives to food. The book examines carcinogens, substances which can produce cancer; teratogens, substances which can cause congenital malformations; and mutagens, substances which can damage genes.

Hunter promoted a diet rich in fruit, vegetables and whole grains. She took interest in environmental issues and donated 210 acres (85 ha) of land to the Society for the Protection of New Hampshire Forests.

Hunter was diagnosed with metastatic cancer in 2014. She died in a nursing home on May 17, 2017, in Hillsborough, New Hampshire, age 98.

== Reception ==
In 1961, when The Natural Foods Cookbook was first published, Hunter attracted criticism from dietitians and nutritionists because she was not using processed foods. Others thought she was a "crank". However, the book sold well and became a classic in the natural and organic foods movement. It was heralded as the "nation's first healthful natural foods cookbook". Frances Moore Lappé was influenced by the book.

Hunter's book Gardening Without Poisons was positively reviewed in the journal Bird-Banding. The reviewer commented that "this book is a veritable mine of information, the logical sequence to Rachel Carson's Silent Spring, for it tells us how to apply both natural and highly sophisticated controls in our struggles with pests without poisoning ourselves and most of our fellow creatures."

Hunter's Consumer Beware was recommended by a reviewer in the Journal of Consumer Affairs as she documented her charges with references to research that supports tips one can apply to avoid dangerous food products.

Her book Food Additives and Federal Policy received a mixed review in the American Scientist magazine. The reviewer described it as a "rather disjointed but nonetheless informative, account of the toxicological hazards of food additives, this book builds up to a climax that underlines the inadequacies of our testing procedures, the failure of the regulatory agencies to endure the safety of food additives, and the undue influence of industry in pressuring regulatory agencies, through committees and other devices, to maintain their products on the market with a minimum of testing." It was positively reviewed in the Ecology Law Quarterly as a "calm chronicler of scientific exploration into what man, the food producer, creates and into what man, the consumer, ingests."

== Selected publications ==
- The Natural Foods Cookbook (1961)
- Gardening Without Poisons (1964)
- Consumer, Beware! (1971)
- The Natural Foods Primer (1971)
- Whole-Grain Baking Sampler (1972)
- Consumer Beware! Your Food and What's Been Done to It (1972)
- Food Additives and Your Health (1972)
- Fact Book on Food Additives and Your Health (1972)
- Fact Book on Fermented Foods and Beverages (1973)
- Fact Book on Yogurt, Kefir, Tette and Other Milk Cultures (1973)
- Beatrice Trum Hunter’s Favorite Natural Foods (1974)
- Food and Your Health (1974)
- Prize-Winning Recipes from the Golden Harvest Kitchens (1974)
- The Mirage of Safety: Food Additives and Federal Policy (1975)
- The Great Nutrition Robbery (1978)
- Water and Your Health (2003)
- Soil and Your Health (2004)
- A Primer of Whole Foods (2007)
- Probiotic Foods for Good Health (2008)
- The Sweetener Trap & How to Avoid It (2008)
- Infectious Connections (2009)
- Our Toxic Legacy (2011)

== See also ==
- Jean Hewitt
- William Longgood
- Alfred W. McCann
- Leonard Wickenden
