= Jean Hewitt =

English-American food writer and home economist

- Born: 15 August 1925; Ipswich, England
- Died: 9 February 1997 (aged 71); Venice, Florida, U.S.
- Occupations: Food writer; home economist

Jean Daphne Hewitt (15 August 1925 – 15 August 1997) was an English-American food writer and home economist known for her advocacy of natural foods.

== Biography ==
Hewitt was born in Ipswich. She studied at the Westminster School for Chefs in London and moved to New York during World War II. She obtained a bachelor's degree in food and nutrition from the University of London and M.Sc from Teachers College, Columbia University. Hewitt joined The New York Times as a food writer and worked as assistant to Craig Claiborne in 1961.

She managed The Times's test kitchen and in 1975 was named food editor of the Family Circle magazine. Hewitt died from pneumonia at Secours-Venice Hospital in Venice, Florida.

== Cookbooks ==
Hewitt wrote a number of popular cookbooks, four of which received the James Beard Food and Beverage Book Award. She was an early advocate of natural foods.

Hewitt was the author of the bestseller New York Times Natural Foods Cookbook, first published in 1971, which gave recipes of natural unprocessed foods. The recipes were dedicated to "the thousands of people across the country who believe in and practice, the natural way of eating for good health."

Hewitt spent five years travelling America and compiled recipes from the cookery of the fifty states for her Heritage Cook Book, first published in 1972. Her book, Family Circle Quick Menu Cookbook offers quick full meals that can be prepared in less than an hour.

Hewitt's International Meatless Cookbook (1980) is a semi-vegetarian cookbook which eschews the consumption of red meat. It contains vegetarian recipes with sections of chicken and fish dishes.

== Quotes ==
For reasons of diet, philosophy, or economy more and more people are becoming interested in lessening their consumption of red, cured, and processed meats and increasing the quantities of complex carbohydrates, especially whole grains, fruits, and vegetables they consume. They are looking to alternate sources of protein such as peas, beans, fish, poultry, cheese, eggs, milk, and milk products... Followed sensibly, with as wide a variety of elements as possible, I believe the part-time vegetarian diet is here to stay. Vegetarians who eat eggs, milk, and cheese and called lactoovarians; those who favor fish have been dubbed pescovegetarians, and those eating chicken pollovegetarians. Plan to rate a three-part name and enjoy good healthy eating.

— Jean Hewitt, in 1980

== Selected publications ==
- New York Times Natural Foods Cookbook (1971)
- The New York Times Heritage Cook Book (1972)
- The New York Times Weekend Cookbook (1975)
- The New York Times New England Heritage Cook Book (1977)
- Family Circle Quick Menu Cookbook (1978)
- International Meatless Cookbook (1980)
- New York Times New Natural Foods Cookbook (1982)
- The New York Times Cookbook for Special Occasions (1984)
- Cooking for Two Today (1985)

== See also ==
- Beatrice Trum Hunter
