= Leonard Wickenden =

British-American chemist and organic farmer (1886–1959)

- Born: 1886
- Died: 1959 (aged 72–73); Westport, Connecticut
- Occupations: Chemist, organic farmer

Leonard Wickenden (1886–1959) was a British-American chemist and organic farmer.

== Biography ==
Wickenden was born in England. He was educated at the Imperial College of Science and Technology in London. He graduated in 1906 and from 1908-1911 was an assistant chemist for Huntley & Palmers in Reading, Berkshire. He emigrated to the United States and took a position in the electro-chemical department of West Virginia Pulp & Paper Co. In 1918, he was appointed chief chemist of their New York laboratories. He was elected a fellow of the American Institute of Chemists in 1926.

Wickenden started his own consulting practice at 120 Wall Street, New York City in 1934. He sold his laboratory in 1949 and retired to his home at Westport, Connecticut, to study agriculture. He was married to Elsie Porter Wickenden, they had a son, Leonard and a daughter Mrs John Hermenze.

Wickenden's first book Make Friends With Your Land (1949) defended the conservation of organic matter and its use in composting. He opposed the use of chemical fertilizers. His book Our Daily Poison (1955) was concerned about the effects of DDT, fluorides, hormones and other chemicals being used in agriculture, animal husbandry and the public water supply. It condemned the use of spraying fruits and vegetables with insecticides as a danger to health and the environment. The book was written seven years before Rachel Carson's famous Silent Spring in 1962.

== Selected publications ==
- Make Friends With Your Land: A Chemist Looks at Organiculture (1949)
- Gardening with Nature: How to Grow Your Own Vegetables Fruits and Flowers by Natural Methods (1954)
- Our Daily Poison: The Effects of DDT, Fluorides, Hormones, and Other Chemicals on Modern Man (1955)

== See also ==
- Beatrice Trum Hunter
- William Longgood
