= William Longgood =

American journalist and writer

William Frank Longgood
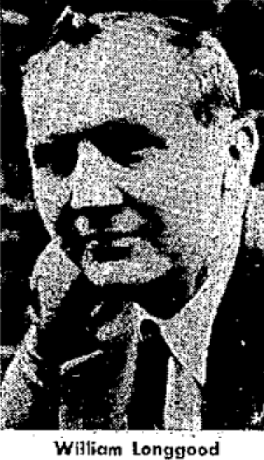
- Born: September 12, 1917; St. Louis
- Died: August 9, 2000 (aged 82); Cape Cod
- Occupations: Journalist, writer

William Frank Longgood (September 12, 1917 – August 9, 2000) was an American journalist and writer known for the controversial book Poisons in Your Food.

== Biography ==
Longgood was born in St. Louis. He graduated from the Missouri School of Journalism in 1940. Longgood worked as a salesman and writer for radio stations in Niagara Falls, New York during 1940–1942. He served in the United States Armed Forces (1943–1946). After his discharge he worked as a reporter for the Newark Evening News in New York until 1948. He worked for the New York World-Telegram (1948–1965).

He was the text editor of Time-Life Books (1965–1968) and a teacher at the New School for Social Research in New York (1966–1972). He won the George Polk Memorial award from Long Island University in 1954. He also won the 1963 Pulitzer Prize. He moved to Cape Cod in 1973.

== Books ==
=== Poisons in Your Food ===
Longgood was concerned about antibiotics and chemical additives being inserted into foods and authored the controversial book Poisons in Your Food, in 1960. During 1950–1952 a select committee held a series of hearings to investigate the use of "Chemicals in Foods and Cosmetics" which were published by the United States Congress. The hearings provided a basis for the book.

Longgood stated that antibiotic residues were "vitamin antagonists" and masked disease in slaughtered animals. The book contains a chapter "Bug Killers in Every Bite" which states that roast beef may contain traces of aldrin, chlordane, DDT, dieldrin, and lindane. It was negatively reviewed by nutritionist William J. Darby in the Science journal. Darby commented that the book was written from a non-scientific bias of a natural food-organic cult follower of J. I. Rodale and suggested that it will "no doubt be welcomed by those who believe with him that the public is the victim of a giant conspiracy joined in by the Food and Drug Administration, the American Medical Association, the "big chemical companies" and, apparently, scientists in general– a charge so ridiculous that it serves only to be ignored." Longgood replied in a letter to Science stating that the review was an "attack" and had damaged sales of his book because the Manufacturing Chemists' Association had sent reprints of the review to newspaper editors.

The book was criticized for citing dubious sources such as Royal Lee of Milwaukee who was convicted for fraudulent claims and Adelle Davis. Nutritionist Frederick J. Stare included Poisons in Your Food in a list of least desirable books on nutritional quackery.

The book was positively received outside of the scientific community. There is evidence that Rachel Carson was familiar with Longgood's book. In 1960, Carson commented in a letter to Marjorie Spock, "It is too bad that Mr. Longgood is having such rough going with his book, although I suppose not surprising. His reporting of the trial would automatically make him a target of the New York State Department of Agriculture."

=== The Darkening Land ===
Longgood authored The Darkening Land in 1972 which received positive reviews. The book documented how humans have polluted the land, sea, and air. Environmentalist Dennis Puleston positively reviewed the book in The Quarterly Review of Biology commenting that "among the spate of recent books decrying the environmental deterioration of Planet Earth, this work stands out from the rest as the most comprehensive and well-documented indictment of man's treatment of his natural world."

== Selected publications ==
- Suez Story: Key to the Middle East (1957)
- The Pink Slip (1959)
- Poisons In Your Food (1960, 1971)
- Talking Your Way to Success (1962)
- Ike: A Pictorial Biography (1969)
- The Darkening Land (1972)
- The Queen Must Die: And Other Affairs of Bees and Men (1985)
- Voices from the Earth: A Year in the Life of a Garden (1991)

== See also ==
- Beatrice Trum Hunter
- Alfred W. McCann
