= Selected Poems 1939–1975 =

1976 poetry collection by John Blight

Selected Poems, 1939–1976
- Author: John Blight
- Language: English
- Genre: Poetry collection
- Publisher: Nelson
- Publication date: 1976
- Publication place: Australia
- Media type: Print
- Pages: 287 pp.
- Awards: 1976 Grace Leven Prize for Poetry, winner

Selected Poems, 1939–1976 is a poetry collection by Australian poet John Blight, published by Nelson in Australia in 1976.

The collection contains 264 poems from a variety of sources.

The collection won the 1976 Grace Leven Prize for Poetry.

== Contents ==
- "Waterlilies"
- "What's a Lark?"
- "Hippies' Road"
- "The Blonde I Never Met"
- "On the Public Transport"
- "Letter to Grandfather"
- "Poem for Trees"
- "Old Man Planting Trees"
- "One Night"
- "For Francesca"
- "The Limousine"
- "Bee's Sting..."
- "Racialism"
- "Home"
- "Larder"
- "Doctor Black"
- "Answers"
- "The Gold Watch"
- "The Mice"
- "On Sundays"
- "Evolution"
- "O"
- "Ennui, on a Small Planet"
- "The Ideology"
- "C.I.A."
- "Someday - in the Americas"
- "Fence"
- "Study of a Man"
- "II : Morgan"
- "VII : Headlines for Anna"
- "III : Bricks"
- "V : Temporary Heavens"
- "VI : First Thoughts"
- "The Awakening"
- "Eye"
- "Bubbles"
- "Bastard in the Family"
- "A Day"
- "The Letter"
- "An Afternoon of Letters"
- "Leaves"
- "The Proof"
- "Letter to Alfie"
- "Invitation"
- "Under the Table"
- "Another Freedom"
- "Observations on a Young Man"
- "After the Expedition"
- "Who Flaunts a Beard"
- "Boundaries"
- "Telegram on Arrival"
- "Wind-Up"
- "Girl in a White Dress"
- "My Pet White Mouse"
- "'How Do You Like My Last Book?'"
- "Writers and Critics"
- "Art Critics"
- "Down from the Country"
- "On The Beach"
- "Why I Write About the Sea"
- "A Cup of Sea Water"
- "A Childs Essay About the Sea"
- "And About Phosphorescence"
- "One Thousand East of Brisbane"
- "Voices of the Sea"
- "The Sea and Infinity"
- "Meridians"
- "1 : A Dead Calm Sea"
- "Lakes and Seas"
- "4 : In a Striped Guernsey"
- "Rope"
- "The Anchor"
- "Dinghies"
- "A Dog to Tie Up"
- "The Beachcomber"
- "The Finn"
- "The Passenger, Sorensen"
- "Castaway"
- "The Rotund Sailor"
- "Carl"
- "Sailor's Love"
- "The Hats and Flags of Pirates"
- "In the Wake of the Ship"
- "Sea Level"
- "The Island"
- "Crab"
- "Ant, Fish and Angel"
- "Currents"
- "The Cannibal Islands"
- "Beach Laughter"
- "he Cotton Tree"
- "Gauguin in Tahiti"
- "Port Trop"
- "Springtide"
- "Black"
- "Periwinkles"
- "A Sea of Jellyfish"
- "Sea Wasp"
- "Sea Snake"
- "Bailer Shell (Cone Shell)"
- "Stonefish and Starfish"
- "Three Sea Sonnets : Sea Cells"
- "Iceberg"
- "The Wave"
- "Tide"
- "The Straits"
- "Beacon"
- "The Headland"
- "Place of the Tube Worms"
- "Seaweed"
- "Low Tide"
- "At Sea"
- "Erosion"
- "Three Sea Sonnets : Surf"
- "The Heads"
- "Mud"
- "Ocean"
- "Waves"
- "Ocean Swell"
- "Rocks and a Ship"
- "Old Winds"
- "The Rocks"
- "Nor'-Easter"
- "Light at Sea"
- "A Sailor's Grave"
- "The Breakwater"
- "The Point"
- "The Coral Reef"
- "The Spit"
- "The Landfall"
- "Farewell to a Ship"
- "A Bottle from America"
- "Landfall of MV Sarawak"
- "Tramp Steamer at Sea"
- "The Hulk"
- "Fisherman and Jetty"
- "Footprints"
- "Of Rock or Wave"
- "A Dead Man"
- "Voyage to the Islands"
- "The Tritons"
- "The Fates Blow Pity"
- "From the Inland"
- "A Fisherman's Cottage"
- "The Old Fish Shop's Windows"
- "Eating Fish"
- "Fish Recipes"
- "The Turtle"
- "Rock-Fishermen at North Head"
- "Coloured Sails"
- "Bramble Bay"
- "Stingray Bay"
- "Dull Day at Pialba"
- "Antarctica"
- "From 'A' Deck, Tourist Class"
- "Palm-Trees"
- "The Beach, Gold Coast"
- "Lines to an Easter Island Idol"
- "Sunbakers"
- "Mrs Carmody"
- "Looking Out to Sea"
- "Life Beneath the Sea"
- "Sea-Beasts"
- "The Sea Hare"
- "The Dead Fish"
- "Porpoises"
- "Small Fry"
- "Watch the Fish"
- "The Shark"
- "The Sawfish"
- "Bluebottles"
- "The Shoal"
- "The By-the-Wind Sailor"
- "Whale"
- "Death of a Whale"
- "Pearl Perch"
- "Ghost-Crabs (for Miss Lenore Smith)"
- "The Jellyfish"
- "Garfish"
- "Queen Fish at Wolf Rock"
- "Dugong"
- "Toado"
- "Lamprey"
- "Dolphins"
- "Leviathan"
- "The Shark"
- "From Fish to Man"
- "Three Sea Sonnets : Shells"
- "Shells and Skulls"
- "Chinamen's Hats"
- "Chinamen's Fingernails"
- "Ear Shell"
- "Oysters"
- "Hammer Oysters"
- "Kookaburra Shells"
- "The Volutes"
- "Helmet Shell"
- "The Worms"
- "Tug Tellum and Prawn"
- "Flatworms"
- "To a Shellfish on the Harbour Rocks"
- "Beche-de-mer at Caloundra"
- "Sea Urchins"
- "Plankton"
- "Cuttlefish"
- "Sea Birds"
- "Cormorants"
- "The Diver"
- "The Dead Shearwater"
- "Seagulls"
- "Sparrows on the Beach"
- "Noddies"
- "Fish Eagle and Prey"
- "Gull"
- "Beach Flower"
- "Sargassum"
- "Mangrove"
- "Moorings"
- "Becalmed"
- "Into the Ark"
- "Port Light"
- "Bride Ship"
- "Colour"
- "The Doldrums"
- "Monsoon"
- "The Oyster-Eaters"
- "Sea Brawl"
- "Crow"
- "Dusk"
- "A New Year Song"
- "Four Horses"
- "No Freedom"
- "It"
- "The Song"
- "Bush Idyll"
- "Mary River Camp"
- "Margaret"
- "The Old Pianist"
- "The Bell"
- "Night in the Park"
- "The Cardinal's Shadow"
- "On a Winter's Evening"
- "For a Friend in Malaya"
- "To a Dead Tree"
- "To a Crow"
- "The Dying Spider"
- "To a Farmer, Fencing"
- "The Parrots"
- "Rain Forests"
- "The Turnip"
- "The Hurricane Lantern"
- "Camp Fever"
- "I Had a Dog"
- "An Old Wound"
- "The Gate's Open"
- "The Friar-Bird"
- "Eagle"
- "The Big House"
- "Black Lace"
- "Totems"
- "Going to Bed"
- "Speaking of Age"
- "Thunderbolt"
- "The Cat-o'-Nine-Tails'"

== Critical reception ==
Reviewing the collection for The Sydney Morning Herald critic Mark MacLeod commented that it is "a selection that will give a welcome perspectiuve to the work of this poet who has often been not as much underrated, perhaps, as simply unavailable." He concluded by noting that "Blight's volume of Selected Poems evinces brilliantly the clear vision of a man whose eyes have been washed by the sea."

Poet and critic Douglas Stewart chose this collection as one of his picks for best books for 1976, noting that "John Blight is one of our most original poets. Selected Poems is the first major view he has given us of his writing."

== Awards ==
- 1976 Grace Leven Prize for Poetry, winner

== See also ==
- 1976 in Australian literature
