= Capitalism, Socialism and the Environment =

1976 non-fiction book by Hugh Stretton

- Author: Hugh Stretton
- Language: English
- Genre: Non-fiction
- Publisher: Cambridge University Press
- Publication date: 1976
- Publication place: England
- Media type: Print
- Pages: 332
- Awards: 1976 The Age Book of the Year Awards – Non-Fiction Award, and co-winner of the The Age Book of the Year
- ISBN: 0521210577

Capitalism, Socialism and the Environment (1976) is a non-fiction book by Australian historian Hugh Stretton. It was originally published in England by Cambridge University Press.

The book was the winner of the 1976 The Age Book of the Year Awards – Non-Fiction Award, and co-winner of the The Age Book of the Year with A Late Picking: Poems 1965–1974 by A. D. Hope.

== Background ==
The author of this volume described it as a "book about the distribution of environmental goods: the shares that go to rich and poor in the developed democracies of Europe, North America, Japan and Australasia.

"It argues that conflicts about inflation, inequality and scarce resources are parts of one central problem of democratic distribution".

== Critical reception ==
In a review of the book for The Canberra Times Warwick Bracken noted that it concentrates "exclusively on the developed western economies. The Third World is somehow assumed not to exist, or not to matter, or to have its future determined by the developed countries anyhow." The review concluded that the volume was "a vigorous, provocative presentation of the issues within a Leftist ideology."
