= Adeline Levine =

American environmental sociologist (1925–2015)

- Born: Adeline Gordon

Academic background
- Education: Yale University
- Thesis: Marital and occupational plans of women in professional schools: law, medicine, nursing, teaching (1968)

Adeline Gordon Levine (December 12, 1925 – February 26, 2015) was one of the founders of the field of environmental sociology and was known for her work on community responses to environmental disasters. Levine spent most of her academic career at the University at Buffalo in New York. Levine published "Love Canal: Science, Politics, and People" in 1982, and co-published the book "Helping Children: A Social History" with her husband, Murray Levine, in 1992.

== Early life and education ==
Levine was born in Geneva, New York in 1925. She attended Hobart and William Smith Colleges for a year, and then studied to became a registered nurse in 1948. Later on in life, she attended Beaver College (now Arcadia University) and received a bachelor's degree in 1962. She went on to earn her Ph.D. from Yale University in 1968.

== Career ==
Levine joined the faculty at the University at Buffalo in 1968, where she worked until she retired in 1990.

Levine's is best known for her book "Love Canal: Science, Politics, and People" which was published in 1982. Levine visited the site in 1978, shortly after Love Canal was labeled a national disaster. Levine's book chronicles the history leading up to the Love Canal disaster, and details the development of local community organizations in response to the government's lack of a response.

Levine is also known for the book called "Helping Children: A Social History" that she co-authored with her husband, Murray. Published in 1992, the book examined the social history of helping services for children in the United States.

Levine died in February 2015 of cancer.

== Selected publications ==
- Levine, Adeline (1982). Love Canal. Lexington, Mass: Free Press. ISBN 978-0-669-04034-0.
- Levine, Murray; Levine, Adeline (1992). Helping Children. New York: Oxford University Press, USA. ISBN 978-0-19-506699-9.

== Honors and awards ==
Levine received an honorary doctorate from Arcadia University in 1989 for her work and contributions to the field. In 1988 the American Sociological Association recognized Levine with their Distinguished Contribution Award.
