= Hugh Stretton =

Australian historian (1924–2015)

Hugh Stretton AC
- Stretton as professor of history at the University of Adelaide in 1954
- Born: 15 July 1924; Melbourne, Victoria, Australia
- Died: 18 July 2015 (aged 91)
- Education: Mentone Grammar School; Scotch College; University of Melbourne; University of Oxford; Princeton University
- Occupations: Author, historian, urban theorist
- Notable work: Ideas for Australian Cities; Economics: A New Introduction
- Awards: Centenary Medal, Companion of the Order of Australia

Hugh Stretton AC (15 July 1924 – 18 July 2015) was an Australian historian and a Rhodes Scholar who wrote books on politics, urban planning, and economics. He was a key figure in the development and implementation of government policies affecting cities, particularly during the Whitlam government.

== Early life and education ==
Hugh Stretton was born on 15 July 1924 in Cambrai Private Hospital, St Kilda East, son of Victorian judge Len Stretton and Norah Stretton née Crawford. He had a sister, Althea and a brother, Philip.

He was educated at Mentone Grammar School and Scotch College for his secondary school years. He subsequently enrolled at the University of Melbourne for his undergraduate education, where he was resident at Ormond College.

However, the ongoing Second World War interrupted his studies and he served in the Royal Australian Navy. He enlisted as a rating on 5 May 1943, having declined a commission. Stretton was posted to numerous supply depots and ships throughout his service, including HMAS Penguin in Sydney and two corvettes based out of Darwin. As a result of his, he did not complete his studies at Melbourne. Upon his demobilisation on 8 February 1946, he successfully enrolled as a Rhodes Scholar to study history at the University of Oxford. His application was supported by Sir Robert Menzies who wrote highly of him.

[He is] of rare intelligence, with marked capacity for acquiring knowledge in an orderly way. He has an interesting combination of solidity and humour

Stretton graduated Oxford with a Bachelor of Arts in 1948 and became a fellow in history at Balliol College. During this time, he also spent a year tutoring and reading history at Princeton University.

== Career ==
Stretton remained at Balliol until he took up a position as professor of history at the University of Adelaide in 1954, becoming the youngest professor in Australia at the time.

He stepped down from this position in 1968 and was appointed visiting research fellow with the university's Department of Economics. Upon his retirement from the university in 1989, he was awarded both with the title of emeritus professor of history and an honorary doctorate.

He taught modern history and economics but wrote chiefly about town planning, housing policies, and social scientists' ways of explaining complex historical processes. He served as the deputy chair of the South Australian Housing Trust for 17 years, between 1973 and 1989 at the behest of then-South Australian premier Don Dunstan.

== Influences and ideas ==
Stretton published several books on a wide range of topics. His first, The Political Sciences, was published in 1969 during his tenure as a visiting research fellow at the Australian National University. He put forward ideas on the importance of urban development for the economic development of Australia which were heavily influenced by his study and personal experience of the National Capital Development Commission.

His 1976 book Capitalism, Socialism and the Environment is regarded as a pioneering effort in the then-new field of environmental sociology. It was one of the first to consider the societal implications of ecological limits.

=== Ideas for Australian Cities ===
One of Stretton's first and best-known works, Ideas for Australian Cities, was privately published in 1970. It was widely-read and stirred considerable interest in the ideas that he presented.

Stretton argued that the Australian suburb, much denigrated among professional architects and planners, was preferable to the agglomeration of large metropolises. He stressed its social benefits and smaller scale for creating a sense of community. He sought to approach urban issues from a historical and sociological perspective rather than a purely modernist or technical focus. He postulated that diversity of people within a city was essential for a successful living environment. However, he did not consider that increasing density was the best way to achieve this goal due to the loss of vegetation and social cohesion that he considered important.

Because of his background in sociology and history, he was an early modern advocate of concepts now considered part of post-modernist planning methods. This included social considerations such as planning for children and encounter. He was able to tie in these ideas with his main contentions on the advantages of suburbs to health and wellbeing.

'Tough' city planners, lovers of adult encounters and entertainments, should likewise learn to think not only of constructing cities for adults to use, but also of constructing adults with life-long capacities to use them as well

— Hugh Stretton, Ideas for Australian Cities p.19

At the time of the book's publication, Australia was undergoing significant social and political change, culminating in the election of the socially-progressive Gough Whitlam as Prime Minister of Australia in 1972. Stretton was employed as a consultant to both state and federal governments over the period of the Whitlam government's term and eventually worked with the newly established Department of Urban and Regional Development. This allowed him to have a significant impact on urban policies of the Whitlam government over the course of his term in office.

== Recognition and honours ==
Stretton was awarded the Centenary Medal in 2001, "for long service to the public housing sector".

In the Queen's Birthday Honours in 2004, Stretton was appointed a Companion of the Order of Australia (AC), at the time the highest honour within the Order of Australia. The citation reads "For service as a historian, social commentator and writer profoundly influencing and shaping ideas in the community on urban policy, town planning, and social and economic development".

In 2006, he was voted one of Australia's ten most influential public intellectuals.

A portrait of Stretton by Australian artist Robert Hannaford won the People's Choice Award in the 1991 Archibald Prize.

== Personal life ==
Stretton had two sons with his first wife, Jennifer Gamble: Simon, a judge and punk musician, and Fabian, electronics engineer. In 1963 Stretton married Patricia Gibson, they had two children: Tim, a history professor, and Sally, an IT specialist in banking.

== Death and legacy ==
Stretton died after suffering from Alzheimer's disease, on 18 July 2015, aged 91. His death was mourned in many Australian newspapers, academic journals, and other publications, with The Sydney Morning Herald calling him "one of Australia's leading public intellectuals".

His work had a profound effect on discourse in Australia across many different fields. His writing, activism and teaching are credited with raising important contemporary issues and leading important public debates across many decades. Stretton's willingness to assist both state and federal governments with policy development in a wide range of roles brought many of his ideas into the mainstream thinking and actions of bureaucracies throughout recent Australian history.

=== Stretton Centre ===
The Stretton Centre was established in 2014 as a partnership between the City of Playford, the Australian Workplace Innovation and Social Research Centre (WISeR) at the University of Adelaide, and the South Australian Government through Renewal SA. It was made possible by a grant from the Suburban Jobs Program of the federal government. Its aim would be to integrate industry, workplace, and urban development. The centre is located in the Playford Alive Town Park in Munno Para. It includes a library, support for businesses, modern spaces for training and workshops, office spaces for small to medium-sized businesses, and STEAM (Science, Technology, Engineering, Art, and Mathematics) learning programs. The Stretton Centre also undertakes research, and in September 2017 the Stretton Fellowship was launched by former premier of South Australia, Jay Weatherill. The fellowship, worth A$100,000, funded two researchers "to work with industry and Government to explore sustainable, new industries that will deliver employment opportunities into the future". The 2017-18 Stretton Fellowship focused on social enterprises.

=== Stretton Institute ===
The Stretton Institute multidisciplinary research centre was established at the University of Adelaide in 2020. It has held the Hugh Stretton Oration each year since 2021.

== Bibliography ==
- The Political Sciences: General Principles of Selection in Social Science and History (1969)
- Ideas for Australian Cities (1970)
- Housing and Government (1974)
- Capitalism, Socialism and the Environment (1976)
- Urban Planning in Rich and Poor Countries (1978)
- Political Essays (1987)
- Public Goods, Public Enterprise, Public Choice : Theoretical Foundations of the Contemporary Attack on Government (1994) with Lionel Orchard
- Economics: A New Introduction (1999)
- Australia Fair (2001)
- Hugh Stretton : Selected Writings (2018)
