= Paul Groves (poet) =

British poet and critic (born 1947)

Paul Groves is a British poet and critic whose work has appeared in many literary periodicals and has won several prizes since he was first published in 1968. He was for twenty years a schoolteacher, after which he spent two decades as a Creative Writing lecturer. He has given countless readings, both live and on television and radio. He was born in Gloucester in 1947, lived in the Forest of Dean, and currently resides in Somerset.

== Publications ==
- Academe (Seren, 1988)
- Ménage à Trois (Seren, 1995)
- Eros and Thanatos (Seren, 1999)
- Wowsers (Seren, 2002)
- Country Boy (Starborn Books, 2007)
- Qwerty (Seren, 2008)

== Awards and recognition ==
- Eric Gregory Award from The Society of Authors
- Twice winner of The Times Literary Supplement International Poetry Prize
