= Natural food =

Food labeling and marketing term

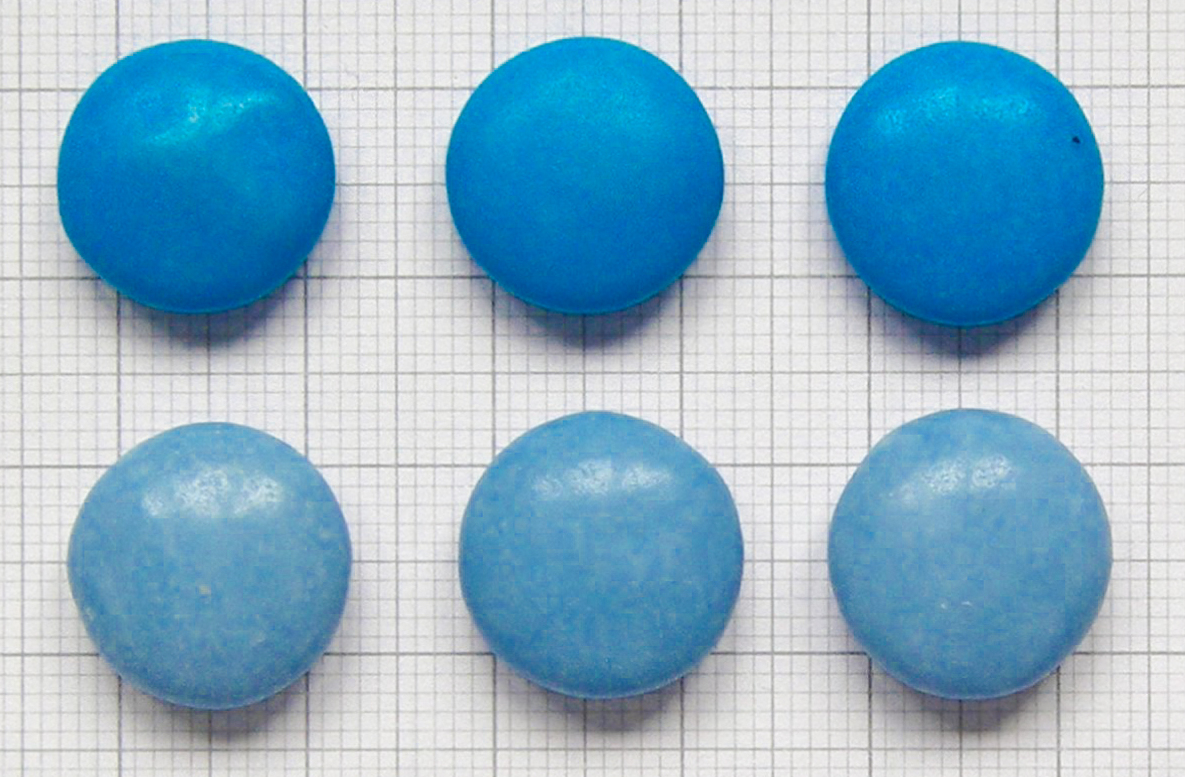
Blue sugar-coated Smarties chocolates were introduced by Nestlé in the UK in February 2008, using a "natural" blue dye derived from the cyanobacterium spirulina (bottom). The product had previously used a synthetic blue dye (top).

Natural food and all-natural food are terms in food labeling and marketing with several definitions, generally denoting foods that are not manufactured by processing. In some countries like the United Kingdom, the term "natural" is defined and regulated; in others, such as the United States, the term natural is not enforced for food labels, although there is USDA regulation of organic labeling.

The term is assumed to describe foods having ingredients that are intrinsic to an unprocessed food.

== Diverse definitions ==
While almost all foodstuffs are derived from the natural products of plants and animals, 'natural foods' are often assumed to be foods that are not processed, or do not contain any food additives, or do not contain particular additives such as hormones, antibiotics, sweeteners, food colors, preservatives, or flavorings that were not originally in the food. In fact, many people (63%) when surveyed showed a preference for products labeled "natural" compared to the unmarked counterparts, based on the common belief (86% of polled consumers) that the term "natural" indicated that the food does not contain any artificial ingredients.

The term is variously misused on labels and in advertisements. The international Food and Agriculture Organization's Codex Alimentarius does not recognize the term 'natural' but does have a standard for organic foods.

== History ==
The origin of the concept of "natural foods" has been traced to Sylvester Graham, for whom Graham crackers are named, in the 1830s. Graham argued that processed foods contravened God's laws of health, and that whole wheat should be eaten in its natural, unadulterated form. He described baking bread with white flour as "unnatural".

British agronomist Guy T. Wrench in 1936 and organic farmer J. I. Rodale in 1948 both authored books associating longevity with unprocessed natural foods from the Hunza diet. Rodale claimed that the Hunza people lived to be hundreds of years old and were never ill because of their diet of natural foods. However, the claims had no basis in fact and were refuted by a team of Japanese researchers from Kyoto University in 1960 who had examined Hunza inhabitants. The medical team found rampant signs of poor health amongst the Hunza, including goitre, malnutrition, rheumatism, tuberculosis and high levels of infant mortality. Both Rodale and Wrench are cited as influencing the organic food movement in the United States.

Natural foods were promoted by cookbook writers in the United States during the 1970s with cookbooks emphasizing "natural," "health" and "whole" foods in opposition to processed foods which were considered bad for health. In 1971, Eleanor Levitt authored The Wonderful World of Natural Food Cookery which dismissed processed foods such as readymade dinners, cookie mixes, and cold cuts as being full of preservatives and other "chemical poisons."

Jean Hewitt authored the New York Times Natural Foods Cookbook, an influential cookbook on the use of natural foods. Hewitt suggested that before large-scale mechanized farming and modern food production methods, people ate "fresh, natural and unrefined foods for granted" and but have since abandoned this way of eating for highly processed foods which are devoid of flavor and nutrition. Hewitt's cookbook offered "the textures, tastes and nutritional benefits of the natural, fresh foods that grandmother knew" and dedicated the recipes to "the thousands of people across the country who believe in, and practice, the natural way of eating for good health".

== Definition by process and by product ==
=== United Kingdom ===
In the United Kingdom, the Food Standards Agency has published criteria for the use of several terms in food labeling. The guidance, in general, restricts the use of natural foods that have "ingredients produced by nature, not the work of man or interfered with by man." Natural flavorings are explicitly defined by separate laws.

There are different standards for various types of food, such as dairy products. It also gives standards for some food processing techniques, such as fermentation or pasteurization. The standard explicitly rules out "foods derived from novel processes, GM or cloning."

== Definition by process only ==
=== Canada ===
The Canadian Food Inspection Agency restricts the use of "natural" to foods that have not been significantly altered by processing and gives examples of processes that do or do not significantly alter food. This includes two specific additional requirements:

- A natural food or ingredient of a food is not expected to contain, or ever to have contained, an added vitamin, mineral nutrient, artificial flavoring agent or food additive.
- A natural food or ingredient of a food does not have any constituent or fraction thereof removed or significantly changed, except the removal of water.

=== Israel ===
A specific ingredient can be called "natural" if it did not go through any processing except for the listed ones. The whole food can be called "natural" if the food is not a blend of foods (even if they are all-natural), has no added ingredients, and underwent only the specified processes.

== Lack of definition ==
=== United States ===
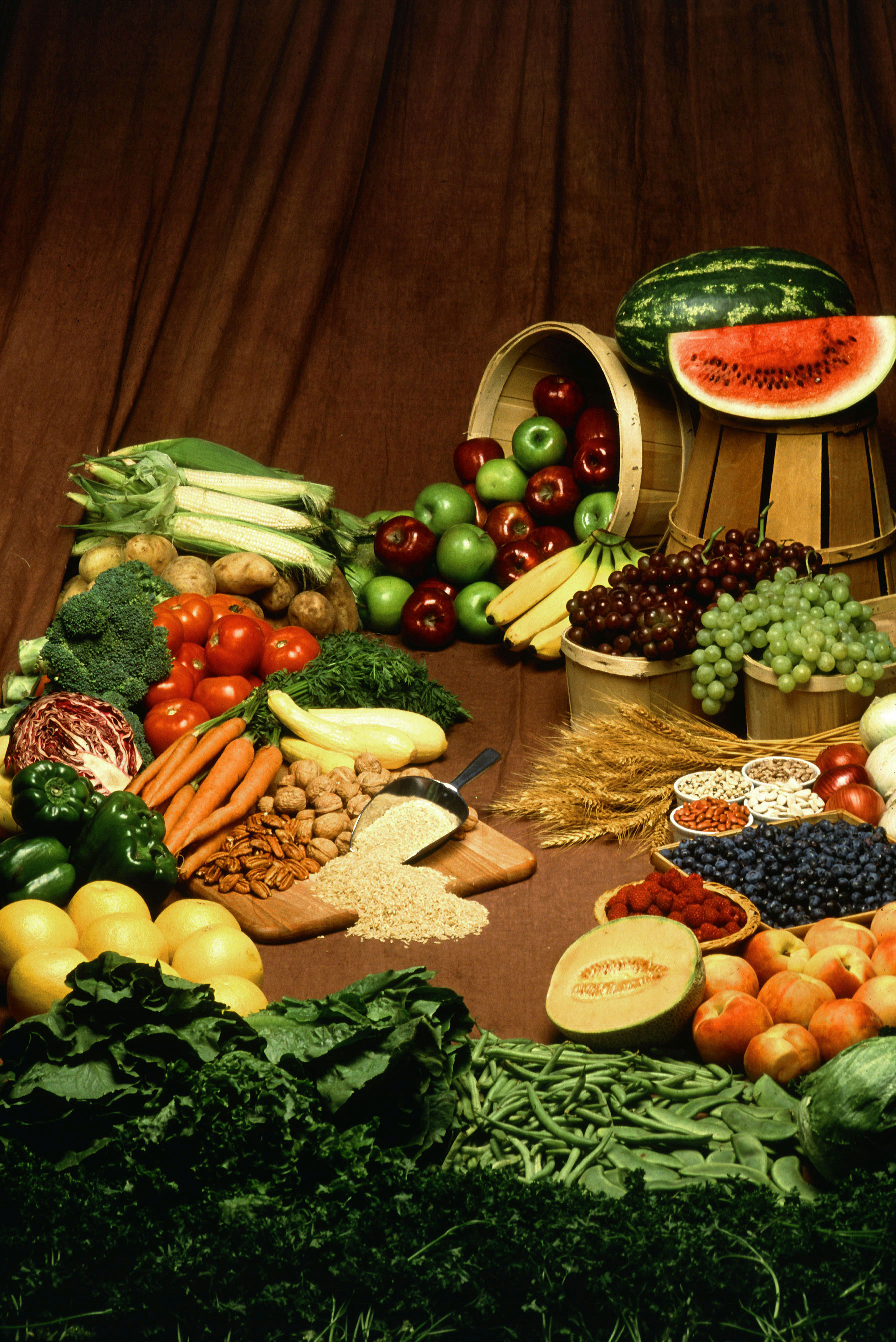
The term "natural" is applied to many foods, but does not have a consistent meaning.

FSIS is a subsection of the United States Department of Agriculture (USDA), which is tasked with the responsibility of "ensuring that the nation's commercial supply of meat, poultry, and egg products is safe, wholesome, and correctly labeled and packaged." The USDA partnered with the Food and Drug Administration (FDA) to develop and issue regulations against the inappropriate usage of "natural" labels; yet, the FDA does not have specific rules for "natural" labeling. It advised on their website "the agency has not objected to the use of the term if the food does not contain added color, artificial flavors, or synthetic substances."

Furthermore, the FDA has not developed any rules or regulations on the defining features of what qualifies a product as "natural". The FDA does reference a definition of "natural" in their informal policy (Ref. 53) that defines "natural" as "nothing artificial or synthetic (including colors regardless of source) is included in, or has been added to, the product that would not normally be expected to be there."

The Food, Drug, and Cosmetic Act prohibits labeling that is false or misleading. The USDA has a standard for organic food called the National Organic Program. As of August 2005, the USDA had a section governing "natural claims" in its Food Standards and Labeling Policy Book.

The poultry industry has been criticized by the Center for Science in the Public Interest for labeling chicken meat "all-natural" after it has been injected with saline solution up to 25% of its weight. There is no legal recourse to prevent this labeling.

== See also ==
- List of organic food topics
- Organic food culture
