= Burusho cuisine =

Part of Pakistani cuisine

The Burusho cuisine (Burushaski: بروشو دݘیرس), also called the Hunza cuisine, consists of traditional food and drink associated with the Burusho people of northern Pakistan. Alternative medicine and natural health advocates have argued without providing any scientific evidence that the Hunza diet can increase longevity to 120 years. The diet mostly consists of raw food including nuts, fresh vegetables, dry vegetables, mint, fruits and seeds added with yogurt. The cooked meal, daal included with chappati, is included for dinner.

== Longevity myth ==
In the 1930s, Swiss-German physician Ralph Bircher conducted research on the Hunza diet. In his book about the Hunza, Jay Hoffman argued that, by the ratio to cats, dogs and horses, humans should live up to 120 to 150 years, and argues the Hunza diet to be the key to this longevity. Such ideas also promoted by natural health advocates have been discredited. There is no reliable documentation validating the age of alleged Hunza supercentenarians.

False claims about the Hunza people living to be hundreds of years old in perfect health from their diet of "natural foods" were promoted by J. I. Rodale and G. T. Wrench. The claims had no basis in fact and were refuted by a team of Japanese researchers from Kyoto University in 1960 who had examined Hunza inhabitants. The medical team found rampant signs of poor health amongst the Hunza, including goitre, malnutrition, rheumatism, tuberculosis and high levels of infant mortality.

In 2005, the Encyclopedia of World Geography stated that "to date there is no credible evidence that determines that the Hunzakut diet of old, not to mention the current diet of the past four decades, contributes to longevity."

Another myth associated with the Hunza people is that because their diet is alleged to be high in apricot seeds they are free from disease. This has proven to be untrue as medical scientists have found that the Hunzas suffer from a variety of diseases including cancer.

== See also ==
- Longevity myths
- Pakistani cuisine
