= Lynn Caine =

American writer (1924–1987)

- Born: 1924
- Died: December 16, 1987 (aged 62–63); Manhattan, New York
- Occupation: Author
- Writing career
- Years active: 1950s–1980s
- Genre: Self-help

Lynn Caine (1924–1987) was an American author and publishing agent at Little, Brown and Company from 1967 to 1976. She is best known for her book Widow, published on May 29, 1974, about her experiences after the death from cancer of her husband Martin Caine in 1971. In this book, she also talked about couples getting financing and life insurance, something Caine did not have after her husband died and she also mentions how she once refused a partnership in a financial counseling deal because she was only offered 10 percent. It was adapted into a TV movie by Lorimar Productions and shown on NBC in 1976.

She wrote three more books; Lifelines (1978), What Did I Do Wrong? Mothers, Children, Guilt (1985), and Being A Widow (1988). Journalist Timothy Noah included Widow in his list of self-help books but criticized it, calling it "mediocre". Contemporary Sociology said Widow "is very well known throughout America and it is a well written personal story of her experiences...".

She continued writing and lecturing until she died from cancer in 1987 at age 63. Before her death, she had published another book Book for Widow through Arbor House.
