= Guy T. Wrench =

British agronomist and physician

- Born: 3 February 1877; Kingston upon Thames, England
- Died: 8 January 1954 (aged 76); Karachi, Pakistan
- Occupations: Agronomist, physician

Guy Theodore Wrench (3 February 1877 – 8 January 1954) was a British agronomist, nutritionist, and physician. He was a pioneer of the organic movement.

== Biography ==
Wrench was educated at Repton School. He graduated M.B., B.S. in 1903 and M.D. in 1904 from London University. He had several years experience of agrobiology in India. Wrench was Assistant Master of Rotunda Hospital.

Wrench's best known work was The Wheel of Health, a study of the nutritional research of Sir Robert McCarrison and of the Hunza people. The book has been described as a "classic of the early organic movement." It was dedicated to Lord Northbourne. In 1939, Wrench published an article in the British Medical Journal on soil health and how it relates to human health.

Wrench communicated with other early organic pioneers in Britain including Albert Howard and Gerard Wallop. He died at his home in Karachi, Pakistan.

== Selected publications ==
- Rotunda Midwifery for Nurses and Midwives (1908)
- The Grammar of Life (1908)
- The Mastery of Life (1911)
- Practical Obstetrics (with E. Hastings Tweedy, 1912)
- Lord Lister: His Life and Work (1913)
- The Healthy Marriage (1916)
- Healthy Wedded Life (1923)
- A Textbook Of Domestic Medicine And Surgery (1926)
- The Causes of War and Peace (1926)
- The Wheel of Health (1938)
- The Restoration of the Peasantries (1939)
- Reconstruction by Way of the Soil (1946)
