= Anne Elder =

Australian poet and dancer

- Born: 4 January 1918; Auckland, New Zealand
- Died: 23 October 1976 (aged 58); Melbourne, Victoria, Australia
- Occupations: Poet and dancer

Anne Elder (4 January 1918 – 23 October 1976) was an Australian ballet dancer and poet.

== Career ==
Inspired by Anna Pavlova, she commenced ballet lessons with Laurel Martyn in the 1930s, and went on to have an impressive career dancing with Colonel de Basil's Ballet Russe de Monte Carlo, the Australian Ballet Company, and the Borovansky Ballet Company for whom she was a soloist (1940–1944).

Elder was troubled by illness throughout her life, and perhaps as a result, "turned her creative energies to painting, poetry-writing, gardening and her house, which she filled with light and beauty". In the mid-1960s, encouraged by Bruce Dawe and Philip Martin she began to publish poetry regularly in newspapers and periodicals, including the Australian, Meanjin, Quadrant, Overland and Southern Review. Her first collection of Poems, For the Record, was published in 1972.

A second collection of her poetry, Crazy Woman, was published posthumously in 1976, and was highly commended in the National Book Council awards for 1977. In 1976, her husband John Elder established The Anne Elder Trust Fund Award for poetry, presented annually to the best first book of poetry published in Australia. The award was administered for forty years by the Victorian Branch of the Fellowship of Australian Writers. It is now run by Australian Poetry.

A commemorative volume of her poetry, Small Clay Birds, was published by Monash University in 1988. A biography of Anne Elder, The Heart's Ground, written by Julia Hamer, appeared in 2018 along with a new collection of Anne's poems, The Bright and the Cold, compiled by her daughter Catherine Elder. Both volumes are published by Lauranton Books.

== Personal ==
Born Anne Josephine Chloe Mackintosh in Auckland, New Zealand in 1918, she moved to Melbourne with her parents in 1921. In 1940 she married John Stanley Elder, a solicitor serving in the 2nd/8th Field Regiment, Australian Imperial Force. They had two children, a son and a daughter, born in 1945 and 1947. After having a heart attack in 1968, her health and spirits declined. She died of cardiopulmonary disease complicating scleroderma on 23 October 1976 in Royal Melbourne Hospital and was cremated.

== Bibliography ==
- For the Record : Poems, 1972
- Crazy woman and Other Poems, 1976
- Small Clay Birds, 1988
- The Bright and the Cold : Selcted poems of Anne Elder, (edited by Catherine Elder), 2018
