= John Blight =

Australian poet

- Born: Frederick John Blight; 1913; Unley, South Australia, Australia
- Died: 11 May 1995 (aged 81–82); Brisbane, Queensland, Australia
- Occupation: Poet
- Writing career
- Notable awards: 1976 Patrick White Award winner

Frederick John Blight (30 July 1913 – 12 May 1995) was an Australian poet of Cornish origin, his ancestors having arrived in South Australia on the Lisander, in 1851. In the 1987 recording John Blight, he describes his Cornish background and its influence on his style.

== Biography ==
Born in Unley, South Australia, on 30 July 1913, Blight was educated at Brisbane State High School. During the Great Depression in Australia he tramped the Queensland outback looking for work. During the 1930s he undertook correspondence studies and attained his Chartered Accountancy Diploma, whereby in 1939 he found paid employment in Bundaberg, Queensland.

Following his wartime years spent in Canberra as an Inspector with the Government's Prices Regulatory Department, he became a part-owner of timber mills in the Gympie region. He took up full-time writing in 1973. In 1987 he was awarded the Order of Australia Medal (AM) for his contribution to Literature and Education.

Blight received numerous awards, including the Dame Mary Gilmore Medal, Grace Leven Prize for Poetry, The Patrick White Literary Award and the Christopher Brennan Award. He died on 12 May 1995 in Brisbane, Queensland, being survived by his wife, Beverley Madeline D'Arcy-Irvine and their two daughters, Katrina and Robyn.

John Blight's papers are held in the Fryer Library at The University of Queensland.

== Bibliography ==
- The Old Pianist: Poems (1945)
- The Two Suns Met (1954)
- A Beachcomber's Diary (1963)
- My Beachcombing Days: ninety sea sonnets (1968)
- Hart : Poems (1975)
- Selected Poems 1939–1975 (1976)
- Pageantry for a Lost Empire (1978)
- The New City Poems (1980)
- Holiday Sea Sonnets (1985)
- Selected Poems 1939-1990 (1992)

=== Selected list of poems ===
Title	Year	First published	Reprinted/collected in
"Death of a Whale"	1954	The Bulletin, 7 April 1954, p2	A Beachcomber's Diary : Ninety Sea Sonnets by John Blight, Angus and Robertson, 1963, p. 18
