= Paul Yates (artist) =

British poet

Paul Yates is a British poet, painter and film-maker, born in Belfast, who initially came to prominence in Northern Ireland when his poems were chosen for broadcast on BBC Radio Ulster in 1970. Two years later, the Tom Caldwell Gallery in Belfast hosted his first solo exhibition.

== Early life ==
Yates born in Belfast in 1954, His paintings were first exhibited at the Tom Caldwell Gallery in Belfast at the age of 18.

== Career ==
Yates began writing and painting at an early age encouraged by his then high school English teacher, the artist, Jack Pakenham a leading member of the Royal Ulster Academy.

His first collection of poems and drawings was published in 1974, under the title White Cat with a Human Face, this title became the inspiration for a work shown as part of the STORYBOARD collection exhibited in the Casa D’Amore Gallery in St Paul de Vance in France in 2019.

Yates was expelled from high school for writing a poem during a mathematics examination. He was forced to write on a blackboard one hundred times, "I must not write poetry in class". A few weeks later the poem concerned was broadcast on BBC Radio by Sam Hanna Bell and Yates was reinstated at his school. Yates's Tabula Rasa series of paintings on a blackboard was inspired by this incident.

Art Critic of the Irish News, Jenny Lee said: ‘The most unusual exhibition at this year’s Queen’s Festival, drawing record attendances, is by Paul Yates. The key work is TABULA RASA, twenty-four feet long and five feet deep, a masterly orchestration of reimagined blackboard imagery and the biggest painting ever shown at the Tom Caldwell Gallery.’

Yates’ life from then on saw successive bursts of literary and visual creativity, evident from the catalogue of his exhibition A Poet’s Paintings at Tom Caldwell in 2005, which saw the launch of Yates’ new collection of poems Mourne, with images by his friend, celebrated artist,Basil Blackshaw.

Blackshaw and Yates have had numerous collaborations including Blackshaw’s work Dunadry Banks, four views after the poem of the same name by Paul Yates.

=== Other works ===
Sky Made of Stone, a collection of poems and drawings in response to terrorism in Northern Ireland published in 1976 by the Appletree Press. Translations in French, Danish and Russian.

In the early 1970's, Paul Yates and Samuel Beckett engage in a ‘dialogue by postcards’ between Paris and Belfast.

Masters Of The Canvas, a BBC Arena commission. Yates’s award-winning film documentary, featuring pop artist Sir Peter Blake, Sir Terence Donovan and Kendo Nagasaki. Winner of various international awards, the film was screened at Tate Britain and BFI London as an example of documentary filmmaking excellence and re-broadcast by popular demand. The film was awarded Sunday Times Arts Documentary of the year by the critic Craig Atchkinson.

King’s College, Cambridge commissioned Yates to create the work “Autumn Windows”.

XII Months of Mourne, In 2010 broadcaster UTV commissioned the documentary, that went on to win of the prestigious New York Television Festival ‘Best Direction’ award.

In 2008, EAST, the acclaimed epic prose poem by Paul Yates was performed by the James Ellis on BBC Radio. In 2014 a sequence from EAST closed The Actor's House, UTV’S tribute documentary to James Ellis, produced and directed by Paul Yates and aired on the evening of the funeral.

New works followed in 2018 with Studies Towards A New Tarot, one hundred and fifty paintings published in a limited edition of 51 decks of cards, launched at the inaugural Saint-Paul de Vence Biennale, at the Casa d’Amor Design Gallery by Isabelle de Botton. A year later STORYBOARD, a series of nine collage-assemblages depicting scenes from an imagined film in homage to the village of Saint-Paul and the surrealist dancer Hélène Vanel, was also exhibited at the Casa d’ Amor Design Gallery.

A work from this series was acquired for the legendary La Colombe d’Or Hotel in St Paul De Vance - whose former guests include Jean-Paul Sartre and Pablo Picasso.
