= Aloysius Michael Sullivan =

American writer

Aloysius Michael Sullivan (August 9, 1896 in Harrison, New Jersey – June 10, 1980 in Montclair, New Jersey) was a United States poet, magazine editor, radio announcer and author of books on business ethics and philosophy. He is best known for his collection of poems, ‘’Songs of the Musconetcong’’, published in 1968.

== Life ==
A.M. Sullivan grew up in the northern New Jersey mining town of Oxford. His formal education ended with his graduation from St. Benedict’s Prep School in Newark in 1913. In 1919, he married Catherine Veronica McNamee and remained with her until her death in 1968. They had two daughters, Catherine and Mary Rose. The couple lived in St. Albans, New York until moving to Montclair, New Jersey in 1953. Throughout this time, they summered in an 1840s house on the Musconetcong River near Hackettstown, New Jersey. This river and the wooded hills of northern New Jersey provided much of the inspiration for his poetry, which drew heavily on themes of nature.

Proud of his Irish heritage, Mr. Sullivan was a board member of the Irish-American Historical Society. He made several trips to Ireland throughout his later life and became proficient in Gaelic. In recognition of his literary achievement, A.M. Sullivan received honorary doctorates from Montclair State College and St. Edward's University. Many of his papers and a collection of his poetry books are held at Syracuse University. He died in Montclair on June 10, 1980.

== Career ==
After a series of odd jobs, Sullivan went to work for the Submarine Boat Corporation in Port Newark, New Jersey in 1917 where he began the company’s in-house magazine, ‘’Speed Up’’. In 1932, Sullivan joined Dun & Bradstreet and soon moved into the position of Advertising and Public Relations Director. Later, he became editor of Dun’s Review and Modern Industry to which he contributed articles related to business ethics, philosophy and management style. During this same period, he continued to write and publish works of poetry. Sullivan retired from Dun and Bradstreet in 1971.

== Poetry ==
Sullivan's first collection of poems, Sonnets of a Simpleton was published in 1924. He went on to publish thirteen volumes of poetry through 1970. A. M. Sullivan's poetry reflects his broad interests, which included nature, technology, history, religion and science. Many of his poems have appeared in textbooks, magazines, audio recordings, radio chorale and films.

From 1932 to 1940, A.M. Sullivan hosted The New Poetry Hour on WOR radio in New York City. This program was broadcast on the Mutual Network and featured live interviews and readings with over 300 poets and writers, including Edgar Lee Masters, Padraic Colum, Stephen Vincent Benét, William Rose Benét, Mark Van Doren, John Hall Wheelock, Harriet Monroe, MacKinlay Kantor and many others.

Sullivan was medaled by the Poetry Society of America on two occasions (1941 and 1976) and served as president for five terms. He was a member of The Craftsmen, a poetry society in New York City, President of the Catholic Poetry Society and a recipient of the Alexander Droushkoy Memorial Gold Medal (1951). One of his collections of poems, Songs of the Musconetcong, was honored by a resolution of the New Jersey State Senate in 1968 and a biographical film of the same name was made and broadcast by New Jersey Public Television in 1979.

== Bibliography ==
- Sonnets of a Simpleton, 1924
- Progression and Other Poems, 1929
- Elbows of the Wind, 1932'
- New Jersey Hills, 1940
- Ballad of a Man Named Smith, 1940
- A Day in Manhattan, 1941
- The Three Dimensional Man, 1956
- This Day and Age, 1943
- Stars and Atoms – Poems of Science and Industry, 1946
- Tim Murphy, Morgan Rifleman and other Ballads, 1947
- Incident in Silver; A Book of Lyrics, 1950
- Psalms of the Prodigal and Other Poems,’ 1954
- Bottom of the Sea, 1966
- Songs of the Musconetcong, 1968
- Human Values in Management, 1970
- Selected Lyrics and Sonnets,’ 1970

== Sources ==
- “A. M. Sullivan, Poet And Former Executive For Dun & Bradstreet.” The New York Times, 11 June 1980, p. B10.
- Who Was Who in America with World Notables, Vol VII, 1977-1981, Chicago; Marquis Who's Who Inc., 1981.
- Sullivan, A. M., Songs of the Musconetcong, Stanhope, NJ; Guinea Hollow Press, 1968.
- Sullivan, A. M., Selected Lyrics and Sonnets, New York, NY; Thomas Y. Crowell Co., 1970.
- Sullivan, A. M., Elbows of the Wind, New York, NY; Kingsley Press Inc., 1932.
