= 1977 Pulitzer Prize =

Awards for journalism and related fields

The following are the Pulitzer Prizes for 1977.

== Journalism awards ==
- Public Service:
  - The Lufkin News (Texas), for an obituary of a local man who died in Marine training camp, which grew into an investigation of that death and a fundamental reform in the recruiting and training practices of the United States Marine Corps.
- Local General or Spot News Reporting:
  - Margo Huston of the Milwaukee Journal, for her reports on the elderly and the process of aging.
- Local Investigative Specialized Reporting:
  - Acel Moore and Wendell Rawls, Jr. of The Philadelphia Inquirer, for their reports on conditions in the Farview, Pennsylvania State Hospital for the mentally ill.
- National Reporting:
  - Walter Mears of Associated Press, for his coverage of the 1976 Presidential campaign.
- International Reporting:
  - No award given.
- Commentary:
  - George F. Will of The Washington Post Writers Group, for distinguished commentary on a variety of topics.
- Criticism:
  - William McPherson of The Washington Post, for his contribution to Book World.
- Editorial Writing:
  - Warren L. Lerude, Foster Church and Norman F. Cardoza of the Evening Gazette (Reno) and Nevada State Journal, for editorials challenging the power of a local brothel keeper.
- Editorial Cartooning:
  - Paul Szep of The Boston Globe.
- Spot News Photography:
  - Stanley Forman of the Boston Herald American, for his photograph of a youth using the flag as a lance in street disorders.
- Spot News Photography:
  - Neal Ulevich of Associated Press, for a series of photographs of disorder and brutality in the streets of Bangkok.
- Feature Photography:
  - Robin Hood of the Chattanooga News-Free Press, for his photograph of a disabled veteran and his child at an Armed Forces Day parade.

== Letters, Drama and Music Awards ==
- Fiction:
  - No award given.
- Drama:
  - The Shadow Box by Michael Cristofer (Drama Book Specialists)
- History:
  - The Impending Crisis, 1841-1867 by David M. Potter, a posthumous publication. Manuscript finished by Don E. Fehrenbacher (Harper)
- Biography or Autobiography:
  - A Prince of Our Disorder: The Life of T. E. Lawrence by John E. Mack (Little)
- Poetry:
  - Divine Comedies by James Merrill (Atheneum)
- General Nonfiction:
  - Beautiful Swimmers by William W. Warner (Atlantic-Little Brown)
- Music:
  - Visions of Terror and Wonder by Richard Wernick (Theodore Presser Company)
    for mezzo-soprano and orchestra, premiered at the Aspen Music Festival, July 19, 1976. It was commissioned by the Festival's Conference on Contemporary Music, with assistance from the National Endowment for the Arts.

== Special Citations and Awards ==
- Letters:
  - Alex Haley, a special award to Alex Haley for Roots, the story of a black family from its origins in Africa through seven generations to the present day in America
