= Marienhof =

Marienhof may refer to:

- Marienkhof, an air base in Kaliningrad Oblast, Russia
- Marienhof (TV series), a German soap opera
- Aert Jansz Marienhof (1626–1652), Dutch Golden Age painter
- Anatoly Marienhof (1897–1962), Russian poet, novelist and playwright
- Munich Marienhof station, a future station on the Munich S-Bahn
- Mariënhof, a former restaurant in Amersfoort, the Netherlands
- Villa Mariënhof, a historic mansion in Tilburg, the Netherlands
- Marienhof, a former name for Lubieszyn, a hamlet in West Pomeranian Voivodeship, Poland
