= Van Grinsven =

Van Grinsven is a surname. Notable people with the surname include:

- Addalye VanGrinsven (born 2011), American artistic gymnast
- Chatilla van Grinsven (born 1991), Dutch basketball player
- Jan van Grinsven (born 1960), Dutch footballer

== See also ==
- Van Grunsven
