= Anna Connelly =

American inventor

- Born: 19th century Philadelphia, Pennsylvania, US
- Died: 20th century
- Occupation: Inventor
- Known for: Fire escape

Anna Connelly was an American woman who lived from the mid-19th century to the mid-20th century in Pennsylvania. She was the inventor of the predecessor of the modern outdoor fire escape; her invention saved lives, causing it to become a safety component in modern buildings. In addition, she was one of the first women in the US to submit a patent application without any assistance from a man. Connelly made contributions to fields such as science, technology, engineering and mathematics (STEM).

== Context ==
Between 1870 and 1920, approximately 11 million Americans migrated from rural to urban regions, and an additional 25 million immigrants, mostly from Europe, moved to the United States. This migration fueled the expansion of American cities such as New York and Philadelphia, resulting in the development of taller and more crowded buildings. This expansion was driven by industrialization, which had started in the country with influence from England. While it led to economic growth and development, it also raised urban planning, public health, and safety concerns; the safety concerns regarded fire hazards in particular. At the time, there were complications with the construction and usage of fire escapes, which were primarily ladders or ropes tied to the sides of buildings. As a result, the risk of fires became a larger concern for the safety of those living and working in cities.

== Fire escape ==
In 1860, a fire occurred in New York City due to a fire in a bakery that was able to reach the homes above it, which had families inside. To prevent similar events, in 1870, a law regarding fire safety was passed; the law stated that "fireproof balconies have to be connected by fireproof stairs", which would increase costs for landowners. Connelly was aware of fire safety issues and the legislation, so she decided to invent a different solution, which was a fire escape design that could be adopted by more landowners to increase building safety in cities.

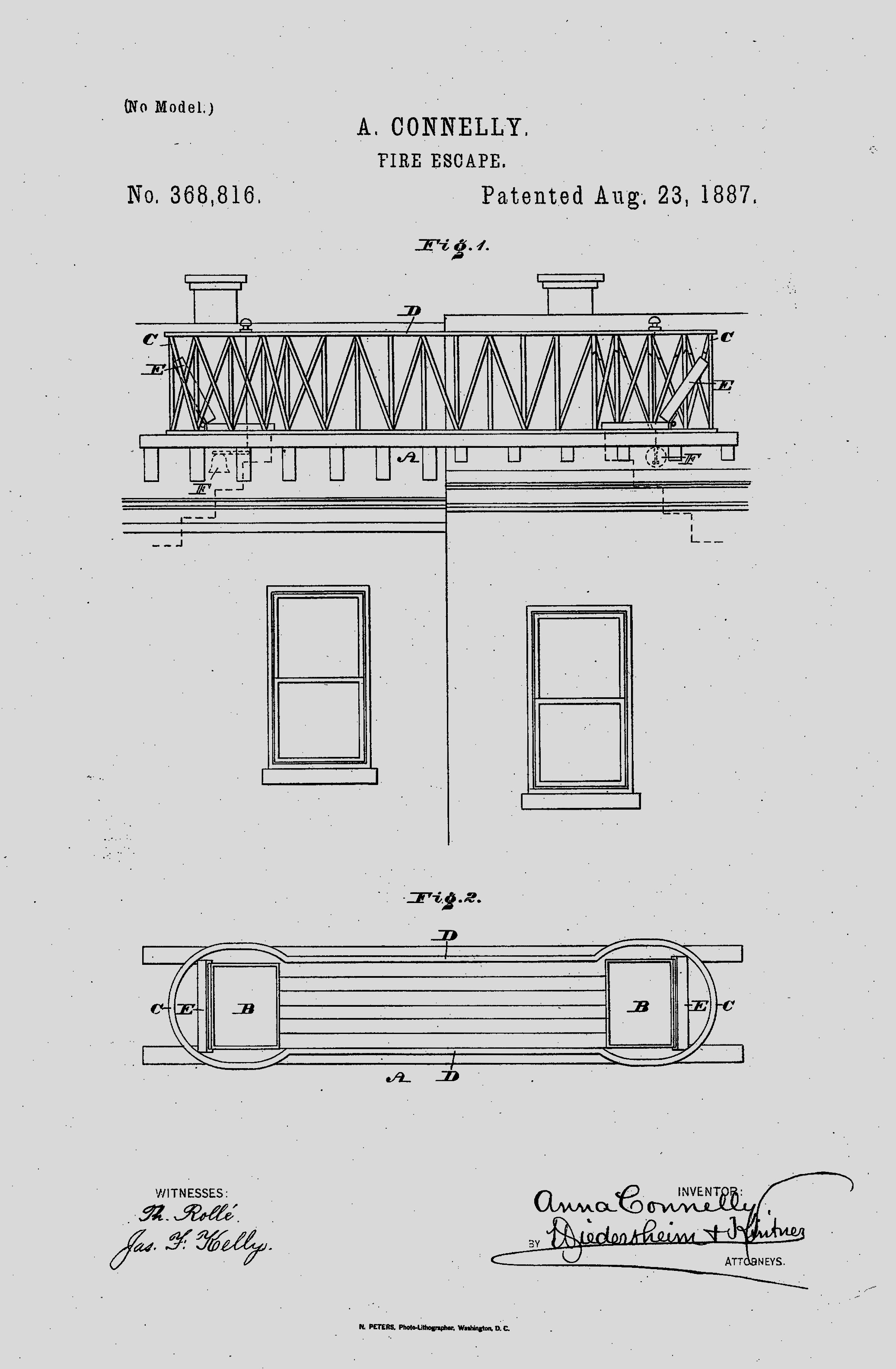
Planning of the fire escape by Anna Connelly.

Connelly's device was patented in August 1887 (No. 386,816A). At first, her invention was planned for an upward escape, since most of the fires causing concerns started at the lower floors of buildings. She invented a platform in which people could escape from a building on fire to a safe one by going down the stairs before fire could reach them. She stated, "My invention relates to improvements in fire-escapes; and it consists of a bridge surrounded by a railing and having openings in the ends of the floor thereof, as herein described, the said bridge being adapted to be placed on the roofs of adjoining or adjacent buildings, thereby permitting the ready and safe passage from one roof to the other."

Her design changed, causing it to consist of a series of metal platforms attached to the side of a building; the platforms were connected by a series of ladders. Connelly made sure that the platforms on her design were wide enough to allow people to move and she incorporated handrails to prevent falls. The metal she used was iron, which is fireproof and resistant to pressure. Connelly's fire escape design gained popularity; as a result, it was adopted by departments and installed in buildings across the country.

== Impact ==
Connelly was one of the first women to submit a patent to the patent office in Philadelphia. The invention that she created would save lives and companies' money; it would eventually lead to the fire escape systems that are currently used. Her ideas have stayed original, unlike others for technologies and materials. The point of her design was that it would be used, and it was used frequently, due to the urbanization at the time. Multiple women during her time would consider her to be a role model.

== Media ==
In 2014, artist Eric Okdeh designed a mural featuring a number of historical figures and innovations for the City of Philadelphia, including Connelly.
