= Van Grunsven =

van Grunsven or VanGrunsven is a surname. Notable people with the surname include:

- Anky van Grunsven (born 1968), Dutch dressage rider
- Marcel van Grunsven (1896–1969), Dutch mayor
- Richard VanGrunsven (born 1939), American aircraft designer
- Riet van Grunsven (1918–2004), Dutch resistance fighter
- Teun van Grunsven (born 1999), Dutch footballer
