= Werkendam =

Town in the Netherlands

- Former municipality, town
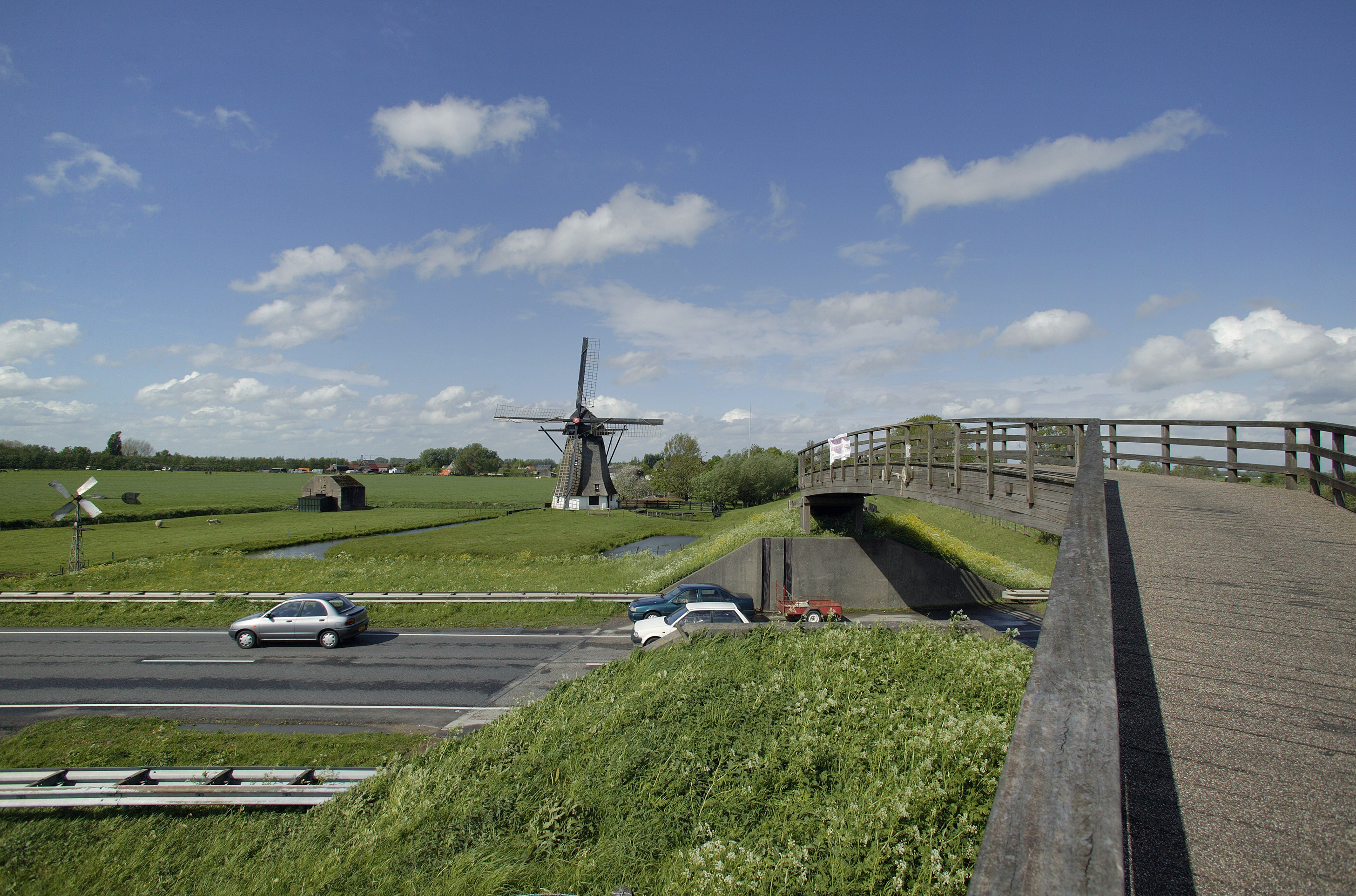
- Countryside in Werkendam

- Flag Coat of arms

- Location in the province of North Brabant in the Netherlands Werkendam (Netherlands)
- Coordinates: 51°48′N 4°54′E
- Country: Netherlands
- Province: North Brabant
- Municipality: Altena
- Merged: 2019

Area
  - Total: 62.88 km^{2} (24.28 sq mi)
- Elevation: 0 m (0 ft)

Population (2021)
  - Total: 11,215
  - Density: 178.4/km^{2} (461.9/sq mi)
- Demonym: Werkendammer
- Time zone: UTC+1 (CET)
  - Summer (DST): UTC+2 (CEST)
- Postcode: 4250–4251
- Area code: 0183
- Website: www.werkendam.nl

Werkendam (Dutch pronunciation: [ˌʋɛrkə(n)ˈdɑm]) is a town and a former municipality in southern Netherlands. The municipality, part of Land van Heusden en Altena, contained a large part of De Biesbosch area as it is located in the province of North Brabant. On 1 January 2019 it joined Woudrichem and Aalburg in the new municipality of Altena.

== Population centres ==
- Dussen
- Hank
- Nieuwendijk
- Sleeuwijk
- 't Zand
- Werkendam

=== Topography ===
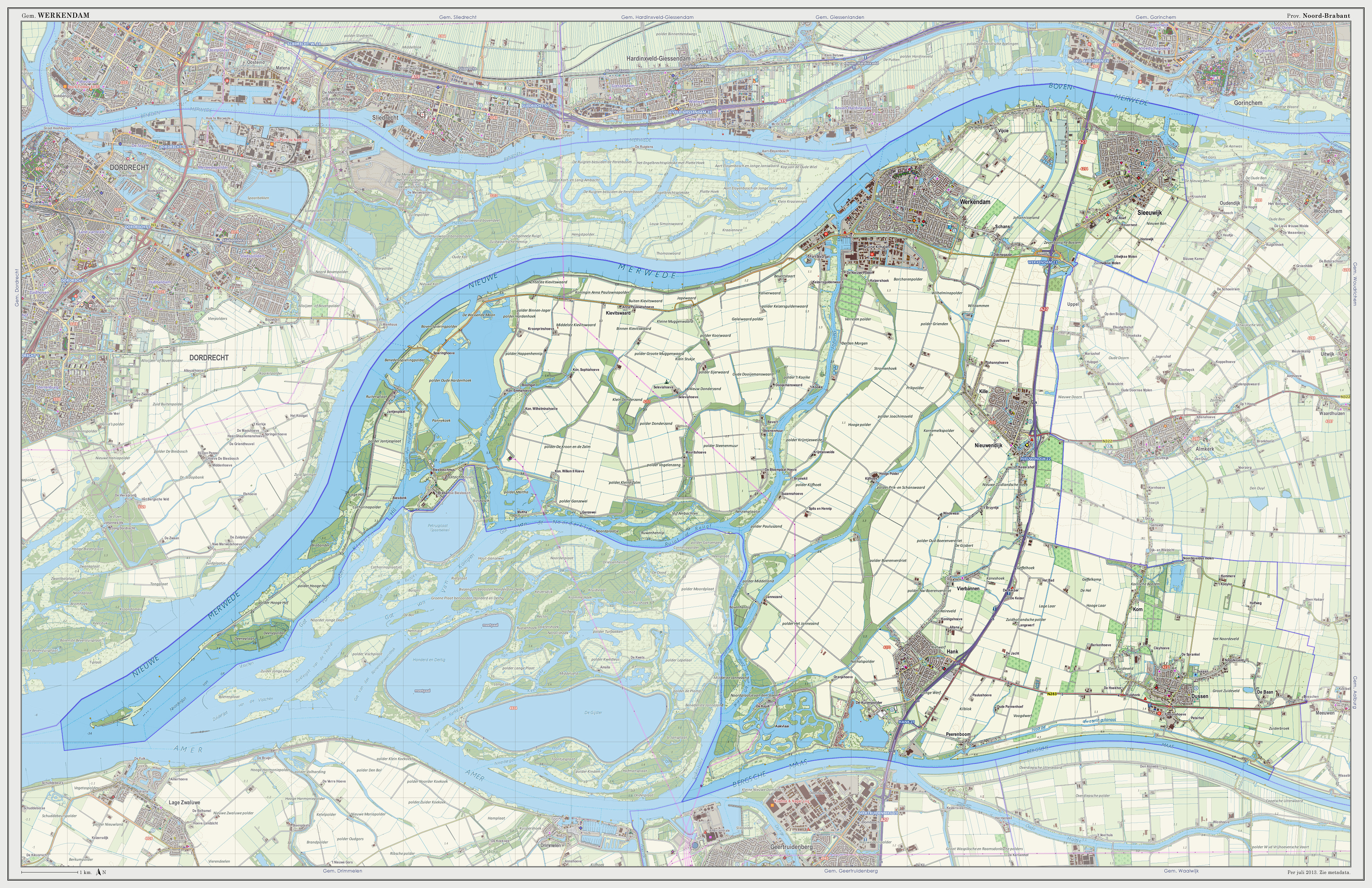

Dutch Topographic map of the municipality of Werkendam, 2013.

== Transport ==
Public transport is by Veolia neighbourhood bus to Gorinchem through Sleeuwijk Tol, and by ferry to Boven-Hardinxveld. The bus between Utrecht and Breda, and the bus between Gorinchem and Den Bosch goes through Sleeuwijk Tol.

For road traffic to Dordrecht there is a ferry to cross the Nieuwe Merwede river.

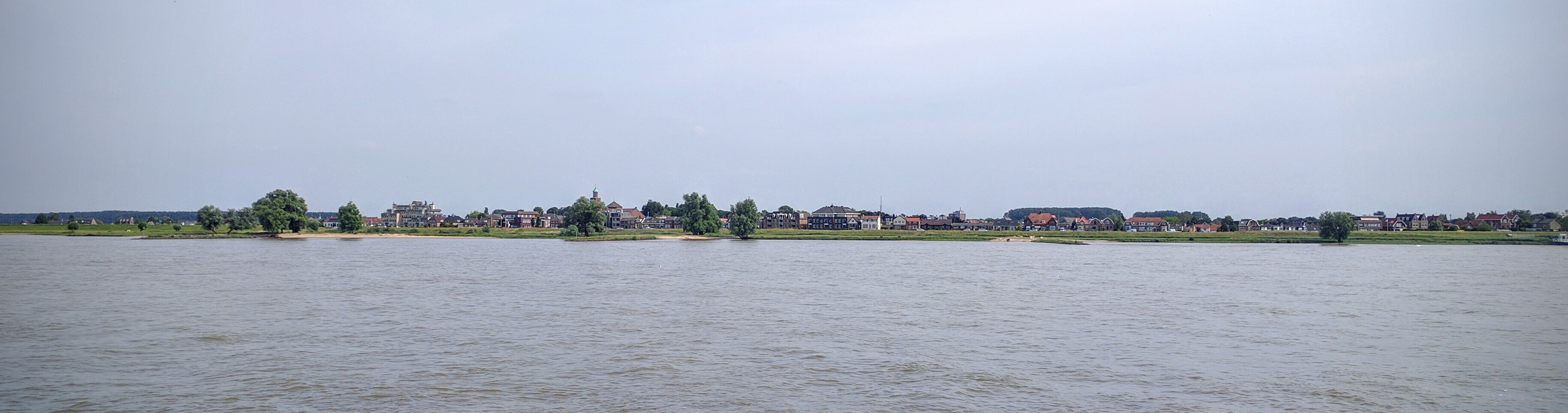
View of Werkendam and the Nieuwe Merwede river.

== Notable people ==
- Gijsbert van Tienhoven (1841 in De Werken – 1914), Prime Minister of the Netherlands 1891–1894
- Anton Mussert (1894 in Werkendam – 1946), one of the founders of the National Socialist Movement in the Netherlands (NSB) and its formal leader (executed)
- Cornelis Pieter van den Hoek (1921 in Leerdam – 2015 in Werkendam), resistance fighter (line-crosser), lived in Werkendam
- Adri van Heteren (born 1951 in Gouda), SGP party chair and Christian minister (in Werkendam)
- Rebekka Kadijk (born 1979 in Werkendam), professional beach volleyball and indoor volleyball player, competed in the 2000 and 2004 Summer Olympics
