= Adri van Heteren =

Dutch Christian minister and politician

Adri van Heteren (born 5 October 1951 in Gouda) is a Dutch Christian minister in the Christian Reformed Churches and a politician. He was vice chairperson of the Reformed Political Party (SGP) from 28 February 2004 to 2018.

Van Heteren was a minister in Werkendam, and Barendrecht. Since 2000 he has been a minister in Urk.

== Electoral history ==
A (possibly incomplete) overview of Dutch elections Van Heteren participated in
Election	Party	Candidate number	Votes
1994 Dutch general election	Reformed Political Party	20	109
1998 Dutch general election	Reformed Political Party	16	149
2002 Dutch general election	Reformed Political Party	16	294
2003 Dutch general election	Reformed Political Party	16	254
2006 Dutch general election	Reformed Political Party	17	140
2010 Dutch general election	Reformed Political Party	25	176
