= The Soiling of Old Glory =

1976 Pulitzer Prize–winning photograph

Coordinates: 42°21′34.6″N 71°03′27.8″W

The Soiling of Old Glory, by Stanley Forman

The Soiling of Old Glory is a Pulitzer Prize–winning photograph taken by Stanley Forman during the Boston desegregation busing crisis in 1976. It depicts a white teenager, Joseph Rakes, assaulting a black man—lawyer and civil rights activist Ted Landsmark—with a flagpole bearing the American flag (also known as Old Glory) near Boston City Hall.

The image was taken for the Boston Herald American in Boston, Massachusetts, on April 5, 1976, during one in a series of protests against court-ordered desegregation busing. It ran on the front page of the Herald American the next day, and also appeared in several newspapers across the country. It won the 1977 Pulitzer Prize for Spot Photography.

Landsmark had recently been an activist for more minority contractors in the construction industry, but was not involved with the busing protests. According to Landsmark, "I had difficulty finding a parking space in downtown Boston, and I was running a few minutes late for the meeting in city hall. So I was in a hurry and perhaps not paying as much attention as I might have as I approached a corner, where the young demonstrators were coming in the other direction. I did not see them until both they and I were at that corner."

Rakes was swinging the flag in an attempt to strike Landsmark, not attempting to spear him as it appears in the photo, and narrowly missed. Landsmark had already been knocked to the ground, losing his glasses and suffering a broken nose, by the time the picture was taken. In the most widely-produced photo, it also appeared that the man behind Landsmark is holding him down. However, the man, identified as anti-busing activist Jim Kelly, was actually helping Landsmark to his feet, and later stepped in front to protect the man from further injury.

Rakes was convicted of assault with a deadly weapon and sentenced to two years' imprisonment and two years' probation. The jail sentence was suspended. In 1983, Rakes assaulted his sister's boyfriend, who later died from the injuries sustained in the attack. He fled prosecution, but returned in 1988 after the murder charge was dropped. Rakes carried the stigma of being known as "the flag kid", but eventually married and had children while laboring as a construction worker and later in hazardous waste.
