= Fire escape =

Type of emergency exit for tall buildings

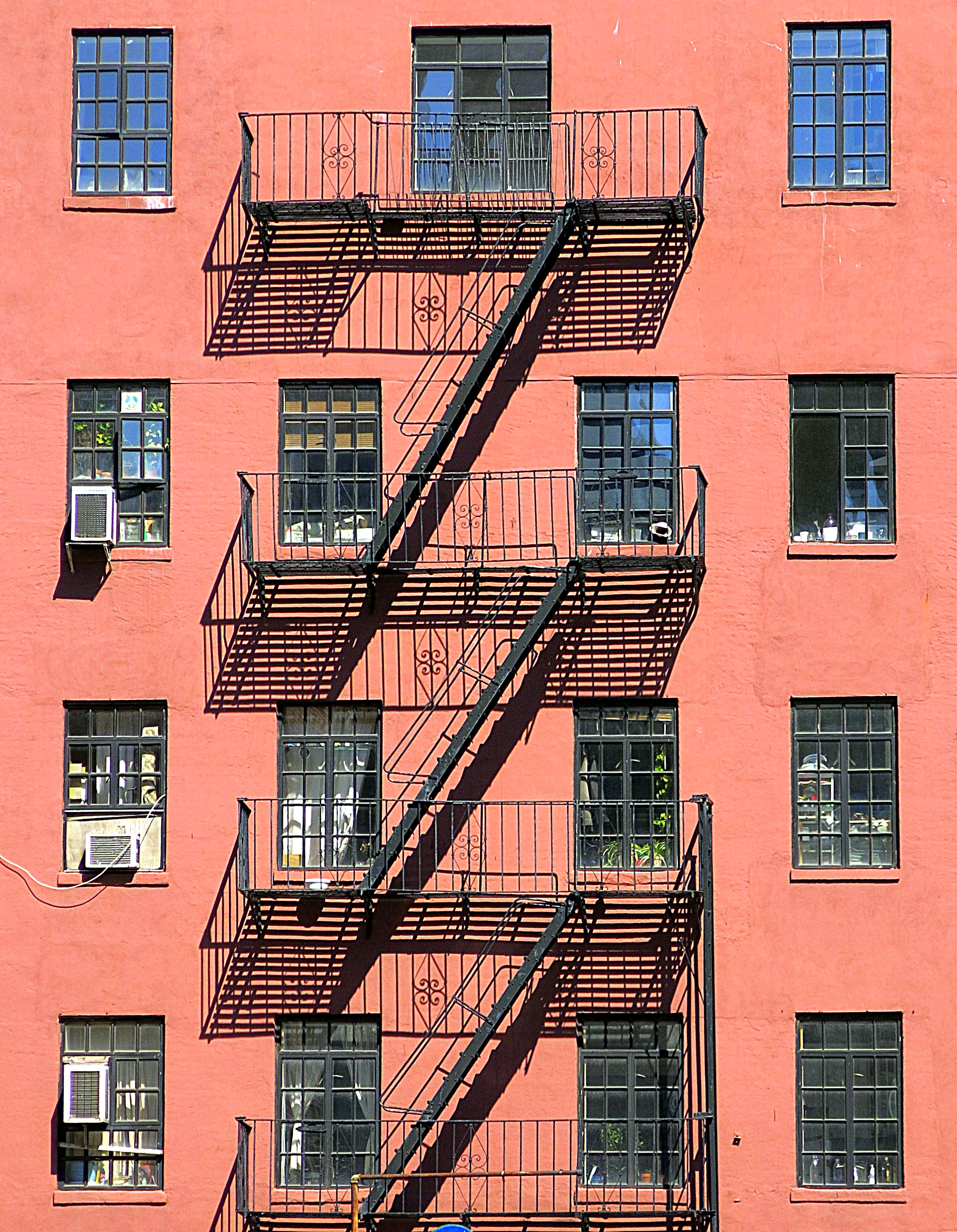
Fire escape in Greenwich Village

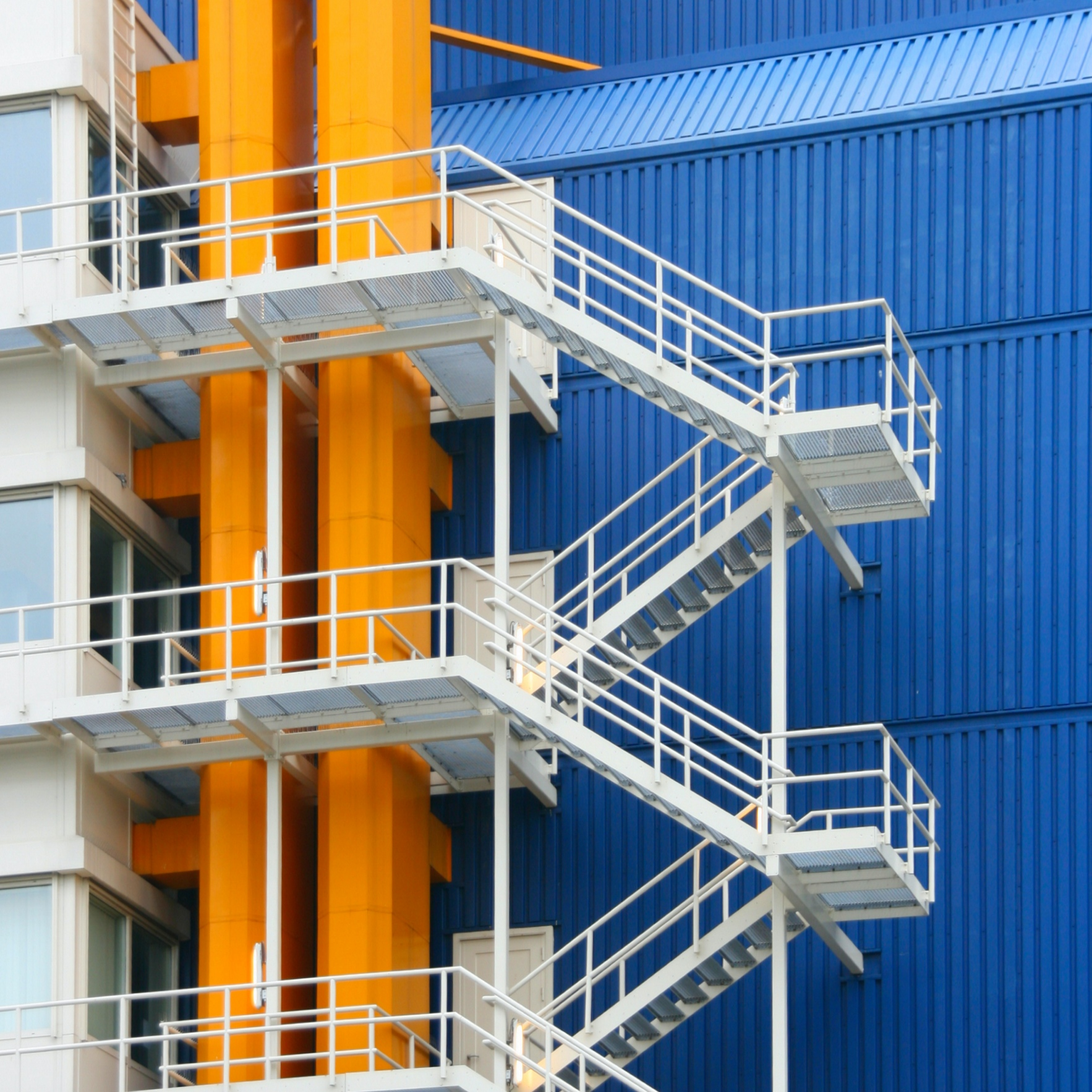
Fire escape in a public building in Rotterdam

A fire escape is a special kind of emergency exit, usually stairs or escape ladders mounted to the outside of a building—occasionally inside, but separate from the main areas of the building. It provides a method of escape in the event of a fire or other emergency that makes the stairwells inside a building inaccessible. Fire escapes are most often found on multiple-story residential buildings, such as apartment buildings.

Fire escapes were developed in the late 1700s and in the 1800s. In the 1800s and 1900s, they were a very important aspect of fire safety for all new construction in urban areas. However, after the 1960s, they fell out of common use in new buildings (though they remained in use in some older buildings). This is primarily due to the implementation of building codes incorporating fire detectors; technologically advanced firefighting equipment, which includes better communications and the reach of firefighting ladder trucks; requiring additional stairwells in the interior of the building; and more importantly, fire sprinklers.

== Description ==
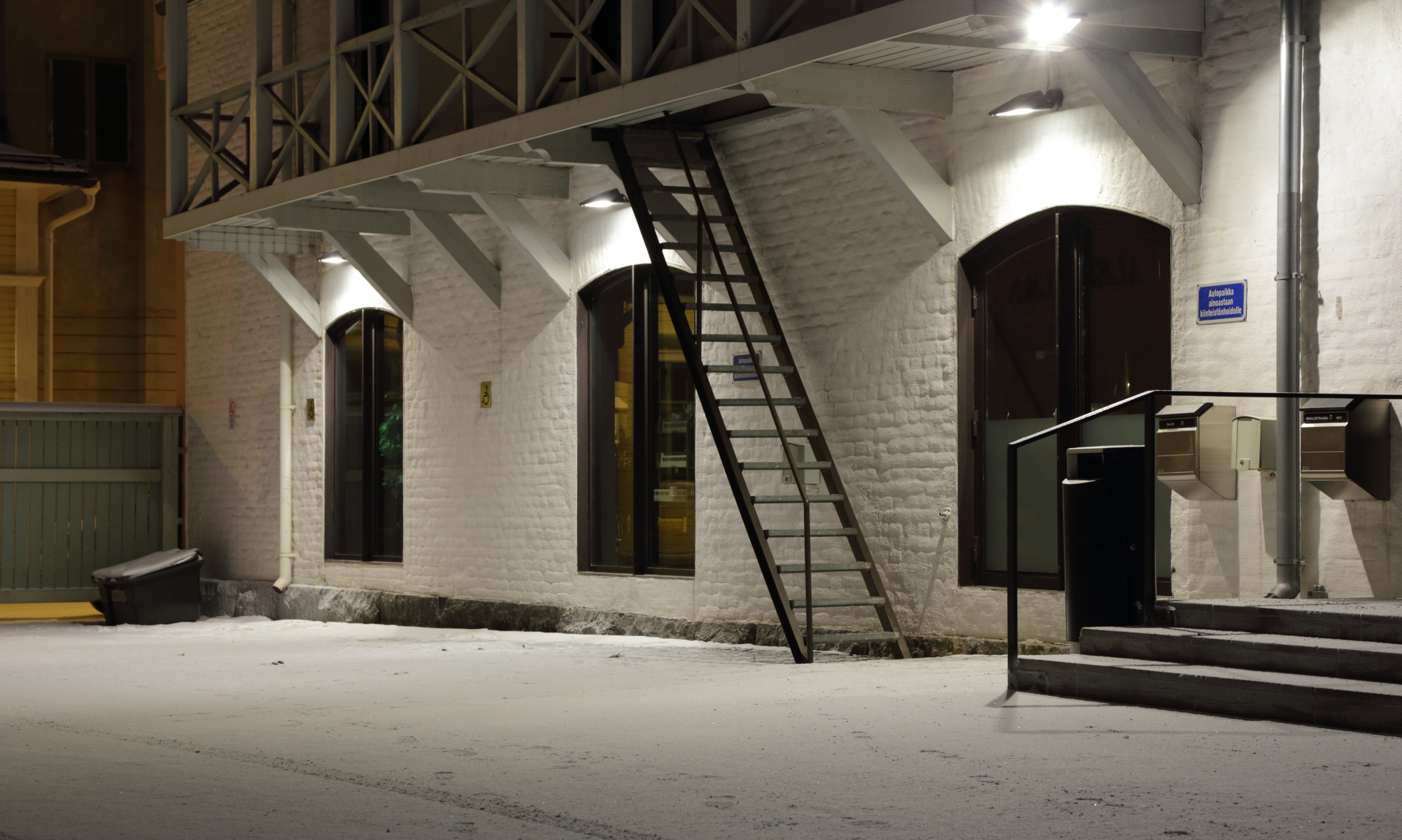
A fire escape in Oulu

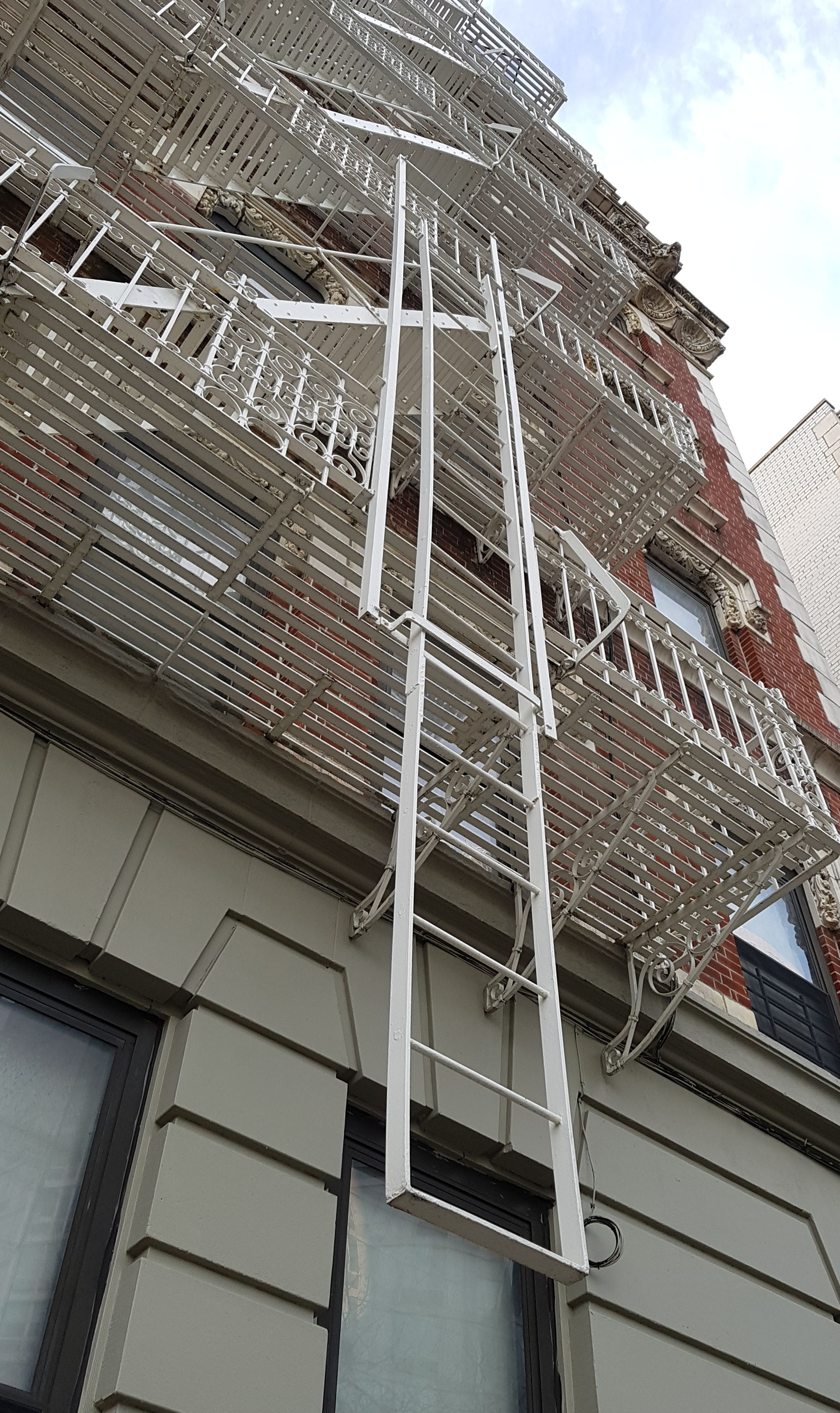
This photo of the lower part of a fire escape in New York City shows the slide-down lower part of the fire escape.

A fire escape consists of a number of horizontal platforms, one at each story of a building, with ladders or stairs connecting them. The platform and stairs usually consist of open steel gratings, to prevent the build-up of ice, snow, and leaves. Railings are usually provided on each of the levels, but as fire escapes are designed for emergency use only, these railings often do not need to meet the same standards as railings in other contexts. The ladder leading from the lowest level of the fire escape to the ground may be fixed, but more commonly it swings down on a spring-loaded hinge or slides down along a track. The movable designs allow occupants to safely reach the ground in the event of a fire, but prevent people from accessing the fire escape from the ground at other times (such as for burglary or vandalism).

Exit from the interior of a building to the fire escape may be provided by a fire exit door, but in most cases the only exit is through a window. When there is a door, it is often fitted with a fire alarm to prevent other uses of the fire escape, and to prevent unauthorized entry. As many fire escapes were built before the advent of electronic fire alarms, fire escapes in older buildings have often needed to be retrofitted with alarms for this purpose.

An alternative form of rapid-exit fire escape developed in the early 1900s was a long canvas tube suspended below a large funnel outside the window of a tall building. A person escaping the fire would slide down the interior of the tube, and could control the speed of descent by pushing outward on the tube walls with their arms and legs. This escape tube could be rapidly deployed from a window and hung down to street level, though it was large and bulky to store inside the building.

A modern type of evacuation slide is the vertical spiral escape chute, which is another means of evacuation for buildings and other structures.

== History ==
One of the first fire escapes of any type was invented in 18th-century England. In 1784, Daniel Maseres, of England, invented a machine called a fire escape, which, being fastened to the window, would enable a person to descend to the street without injury. Abraham Wivell created a variation on the design, including an escape chute, after becoming superintendent of the "Royal Society for the Protection of Life from Fire." The first modern fire escape was patented by Anna Conelly in 1887. Henry Vieregg patented a US fire escape in Grand Island, NE in November 8, 1898 U.S. patent 614,043 (serial number 681,672), which was designed for traveling businessmen.

As building codes became more common in countries around the turn of the 20th century, fire safety became an important concern for new construction. Building owners were increasingly required to provide adequate escape routes, and at the time, fire escapes seemed the best option available. Not only could they be included in new construction at a low cost, but they could very easily be added to existing construction. As building codes evolved and more safety concerns were addressed over subsequent editions, all construction above a certain number of stories was required to have a second means of egress, and external fire escapes were allowed as a retrofit option for existing buildings prior to the post-World War II period.

In the 1930s, the enclosed tubular chute-type fire escape became widely accepted for schools, hospitals and other institutions, replacing the open iron ladder type. Its main advantage was that people would have no reason to use it for anything other than a fire escape, and patients could be slid down it on their bedding in event of fire.

However, with the rise of urban sprawl in the mid-20th century, particularly the increase in public housing in cities in the United States and Europe in the 1950s and 1960s, certain problems with fire escapes became clear. In the poorer areas of several major American cities, such as New York, Boston, Chicago, Cleveland, Detroit, Philadelphia, and Pittsburgh, fire escapes were commonly used for everything but their intended purpose. Some residents placed items on the fire escape (chairs, bicycles or plants), which added weight to the structure and impeded its use as an emergency escape. In the hot summer months, residents of mid-rise apartment buildings would sleep outside on the platforms of their fire escapes.

The popularity of using fire escapes for non-emergency use is attested to in pop culture. A plot premise of Cornell Woolrich's 1947 short story, "The Boy Cried Murder" is a boy who, while sleeping on a fire escape, witnesses a murder in a neighboring apartment; this story received a film adaptation as the suspense thriller The Window (1949). The practice of sleeping on fire escapes can also be seen in Alfred Hitchcock's 1954 movie Rear Window (also based on a Woolrich short story), as well as Weegee's photography of the Lower East Side. Diagonal shadows of fire escapes made them a constant motif in film noir, and the balcony scene of Romeo and Juliet was transposed to a fire escape for the musical West Side Story. Fire escapes could also be used to comic effect, as seen in Stanley Kramer's 1963 comedy It's a Mad, Mad, Mad, Mad World.

The installation of window air conditioners in individual apartment units with fire escape-facing windows, often installed against code or local ordinance by residents, which require the unit to be affixed to the window sash, also make a fire escape nearly useless in the summer months; the bulk and weight of an air conditioner unit placed onto or over a fire escape in an emergency also creates additional danger for firefighters and evacuees.

Boston Herald American photographer Stanley Forman won a 1976 Pulitzer Prize for the photograph Fire Escape Collapse, capturing a young woman and child plunging from a faulty fire escape during a 1975 Boston fire. The controversial image resulted in some jurisdictions enacting tougher fire safety codes.

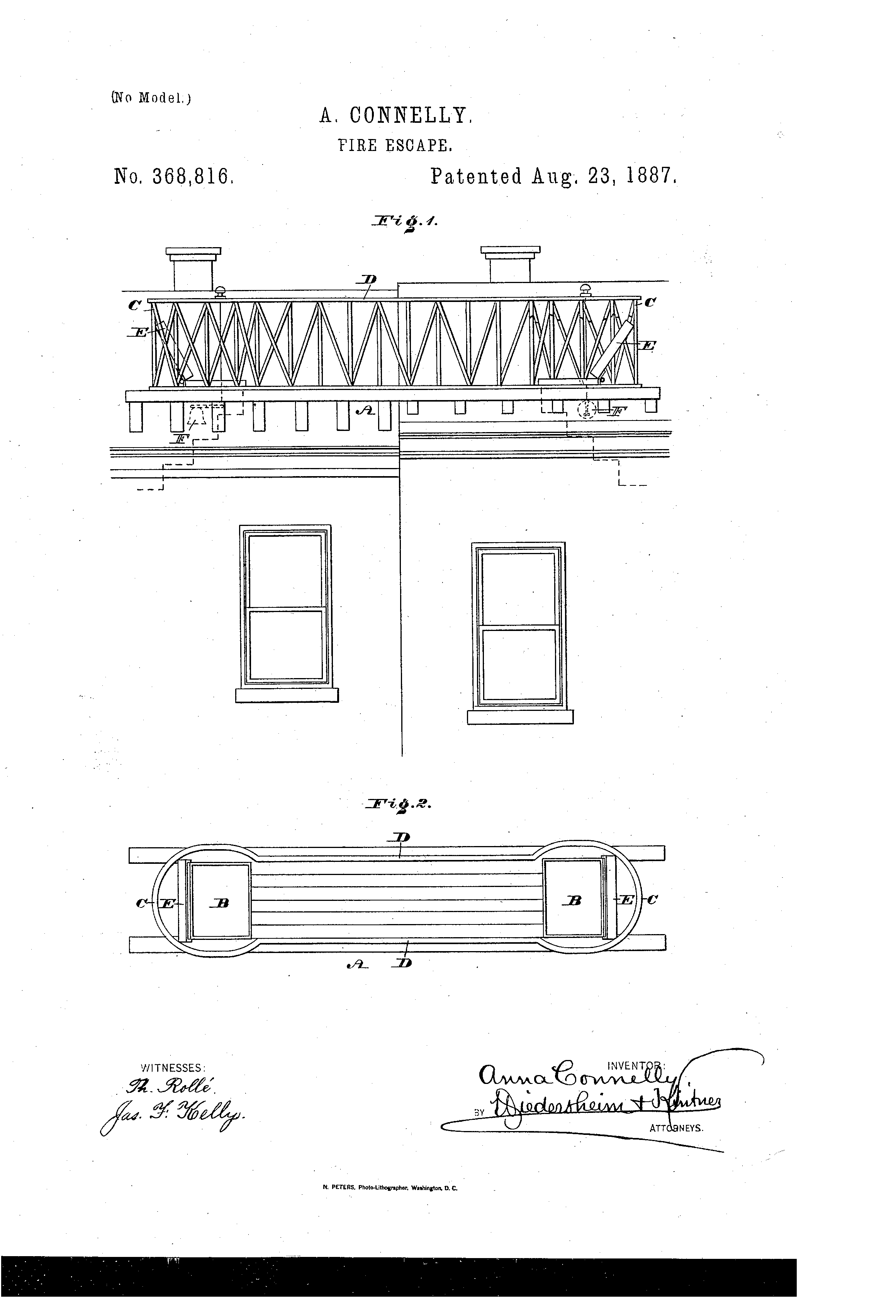
Anna Connelly's 1887 patent, no. US368816A, for a fire escape

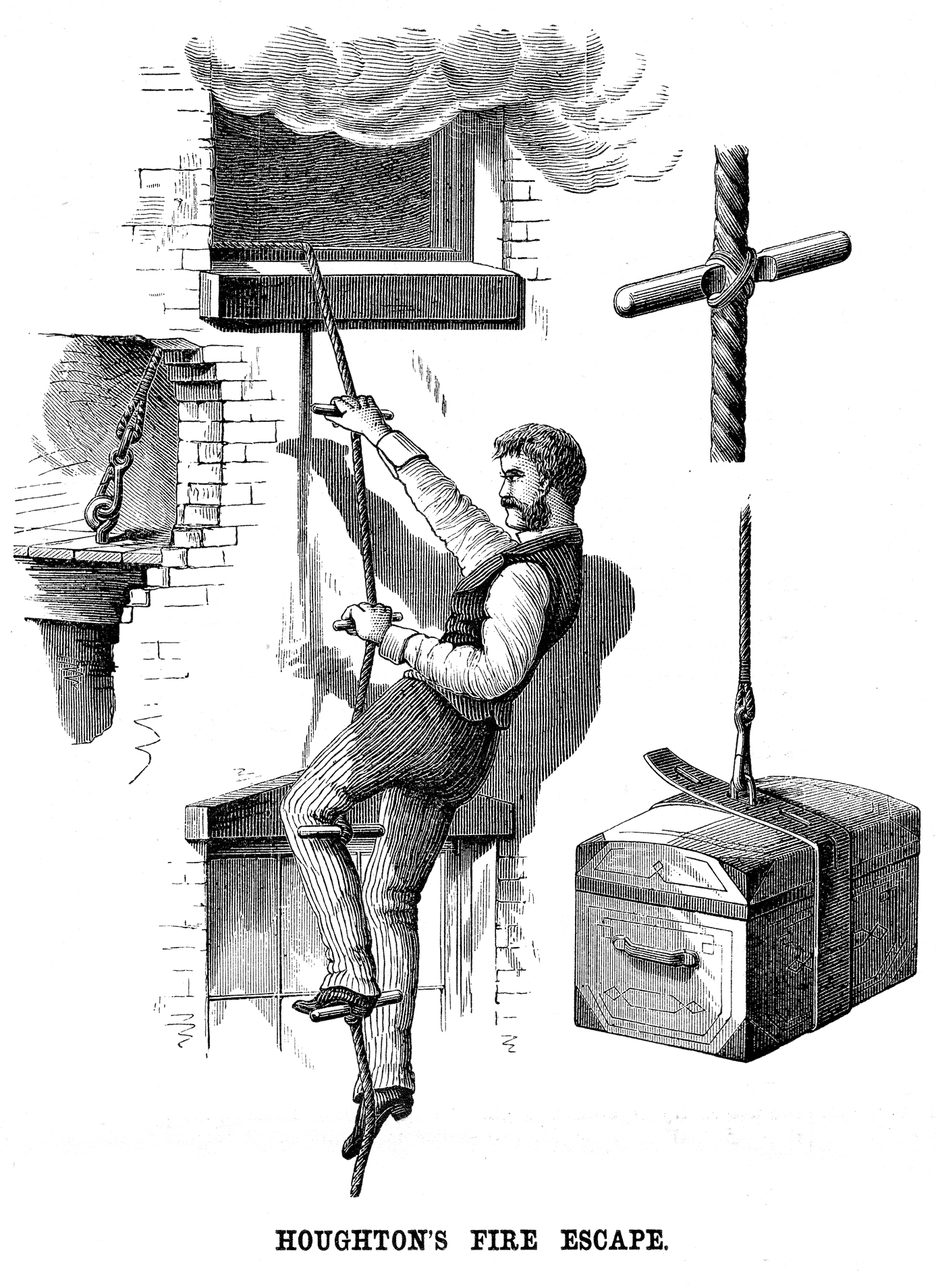
Houghton's portable fire escape 1877

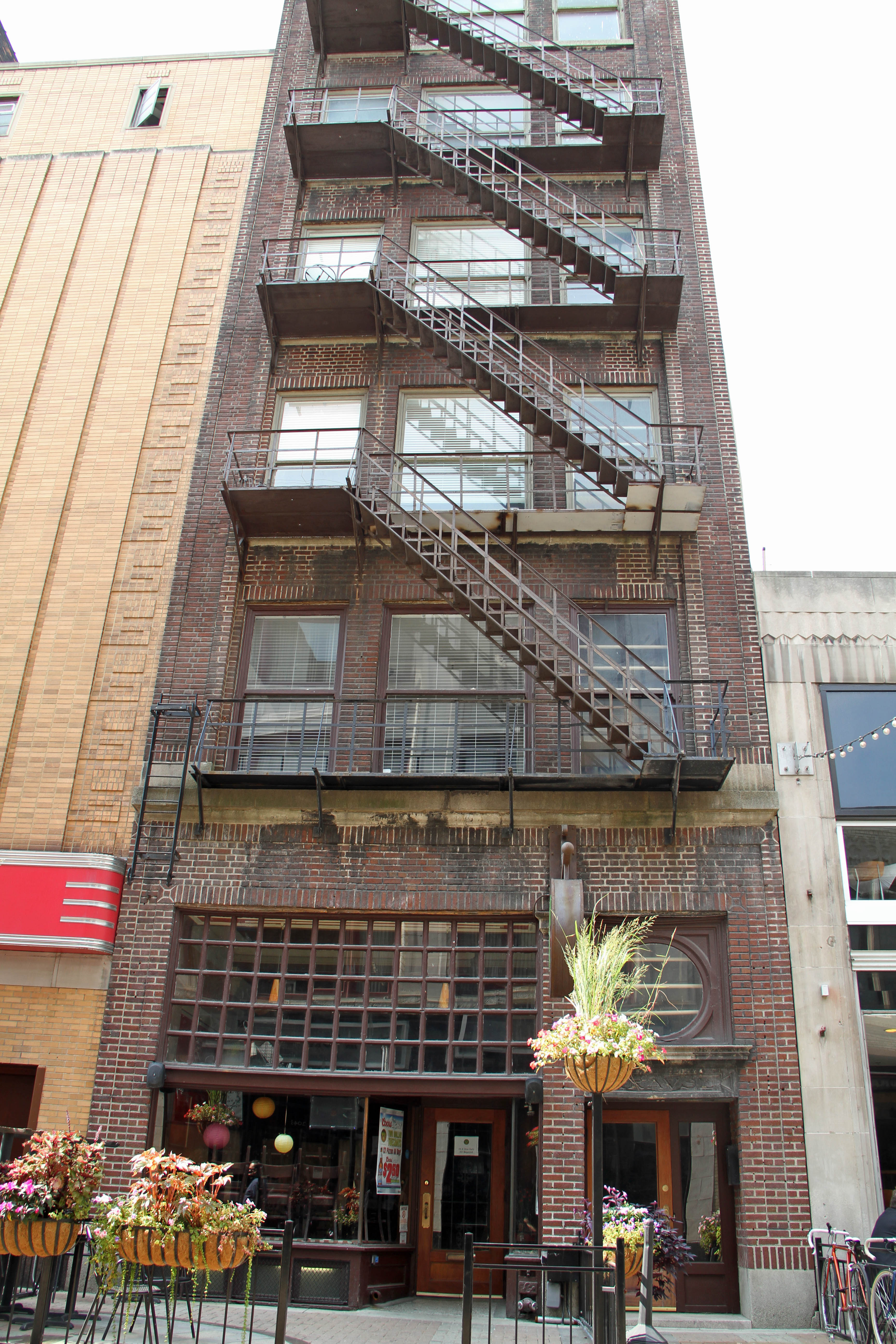
Fire escape at the Krause Building on East 4th Street, Cleveland

== High-rise fire escapes ==
As buildings are built taller and taller, new fire escape ideas have been gaining popularity. Elevators, though traditionally not used as fire escapes, are now being thought of as a possible evacuation for high-rises and skyscrapers.

== Residential ==
The use of a fire escape is dictated by various local, state, and agreed-upon international building codes, such as standards provided by the International Code Council (ICC), the International Building Code (IBC), or the International Energy Conservation Code. Both the 2012 IBC and 2012 IRC require emergency escape and rescue openings for residential buildings of four floors or fewer, in sleeping rooms and basements with habitable space, for means of emergency egress.

A fire escape can be a window, and if above the first floor with an approved ladder, or door that leads to a porch with ground access or a fire escape ladder. Federal rules, such as those of the U.S. Department of Housing and Urban Development (HUD), have requirements that follow ICC codes.

== See also ==
- ANSI/ISEA 110-2003
