= Riet van Grunsven =

Dutch resistance member

Maria Catharina van Grunsven
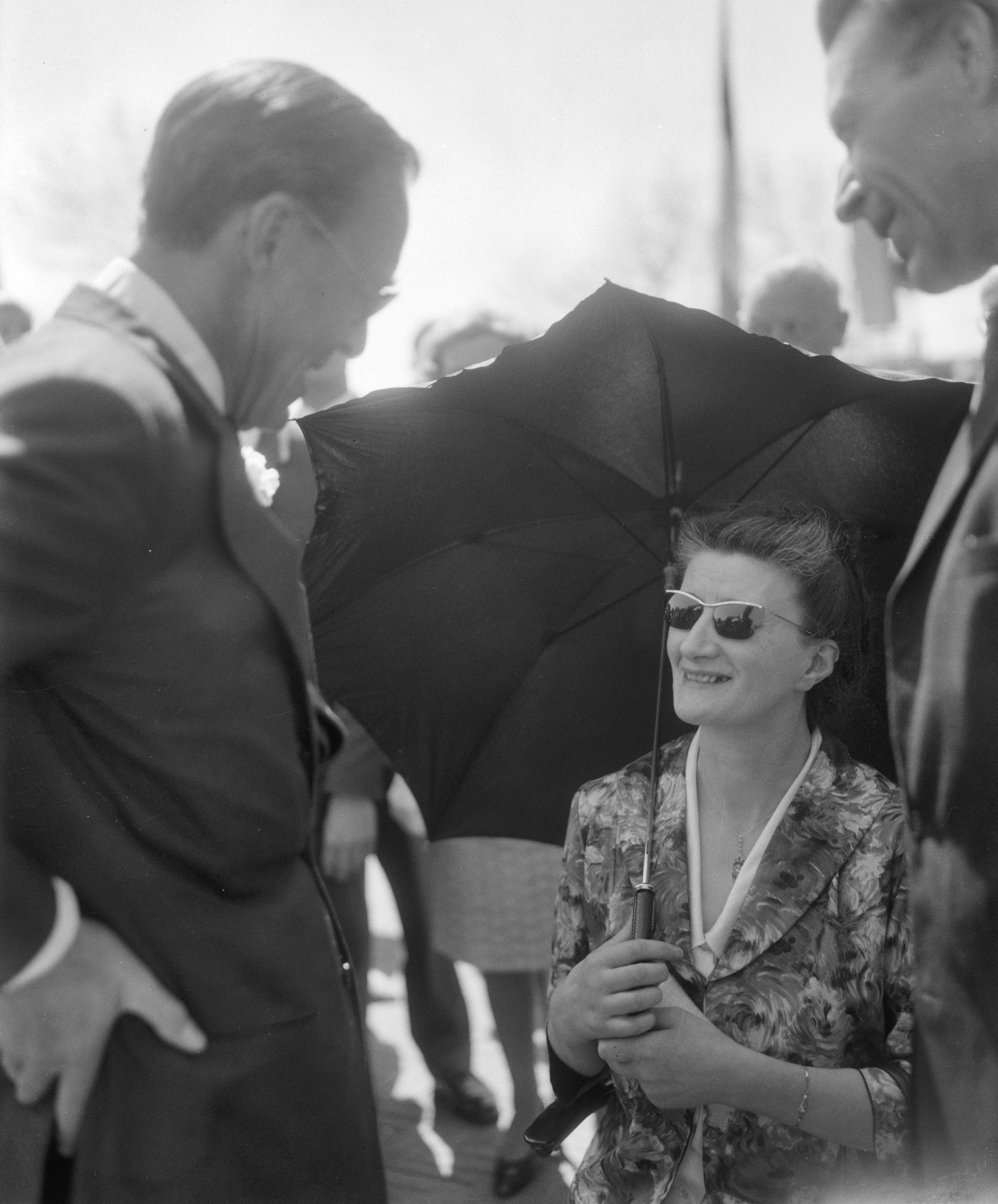
- Prince Bernhard and Riet van Grunsven, at the 1966 unveiling of the line crossers’ monument in Sliedrecht, Netherlands
- Born: 6 September 1918; Geffen, Netherlands, (Maasdonk Province, now North Brabant)
- Died: 1 March 2004 (aged 85) 's-Hertogenbosch, North Brabant, Netherlands
- Other names: M.C. van Grunsven, Riet van Grunsven, Riet van de Haterd-van Grunsven, Ice Block and Trouble (Dutch Resistance aliases)
- Awards: Bronzen Leeuw (Bronze Lion, Netherlands, 1949)

Maria Catharina van Grunsven (6 September 1918 – 1 March 2004), also known as Riet van Grunsven or Riet van de Haterd-van Grunsven, was an armed member of the Dutch Resistance during World War II. One of 21 people who became "line-crossers", special agents who helped to maintain a secret connection between occupied and liberated Netherlands across the waterways of the Biesbosch and the Merwede, she operated as a courier for part of the larger Biesbosch resistance group, and the Albrecht intelligence group. During this resistance work, she was given the aliases "Ice Block" and "Trouble".

In recognition of her valor, she was honored with a personal audience with Queen Wilhelmina of the Netherlands in 1946, and was awarded the Bronzen Leeuw (the Bronze Lion), which was personally presented to her by Prince Bernhard of the Netherlands in 1949.

== Formative years ==
Born on 6 September 1918 in Geffen, in what was the Maasdonk province (and in what is now a section of the North Brabant province of the Netherlands), Maria Catharina (“Riet”) van Grunsven was the eldest child of her family. Her father was a contractor who engaged in animal husbandry, raising chickens and the occasional pig while also producing milk and cheese from the family's cow to help support his family. He was also reportedly was a firearms enthusiast who also enjoyed archery.

== World War II ==
Maria Catharina (“Riet”) van Grunsven and her father both joined the Dutch Resistance when World War II broke out in Europe. Immediately becoming an armed freedom fighter, she initially operated in the Netherlands province of North Brabant, gathering intelligence, delivering medication to Allied and Resistance troops in the north and performing courier duties for her resistance cell while also helping to free captive Dutch citizens from the prison at Mariënhof, the Herzogenbusch concentration camp in Vught, and Kamp Sint-Michielsgestel.

Meanwhile, her father assisted the Landelijke Knokploegen (the National Knokploegen or LKP), a resistance organization established by the National Organization for Assistance to Abduction (LO), which falsified identity cards and ration cards as part of the group's efforts to help Dutch citizens evade persecution and capture by Nazi officials. Hiding soldiers, businessmen and political figures in the attic of a secret annex he had built into the van Grunsven home, which was located in one of Geffen's more secluded areas, he then hid more at-risk individuals in a shelter he had constructed outside between two wooded hills. Under increasing scrutiny, he was arrested multiple times.

As Riet van Grunsven continued her resistance work, she accepted increasingly dangerous assignments. During one, she broke two fingers while evading capture, an injury which left those two fingers in a permanently crooked state. In September 1944, she was assigned to rescue a priest and another Dutch citizen who had been arrested and sentenced to death after being falsely accused of blowing up a railroad. Dressed in a nurse's uniform and carrying a 6.35 mm revolver, she infiltrated the prison at Mariënhof by bribing a guard with a bottle of wine laced with sleeping medication. After locating the key to the men's cell, she spirited the pair out of the prison, and sent them to a Taalstraat safehouse.

By the final year of the war, Riet van Grunsven had become a “line crosser,” one of just 21 special resistance operatives from the larger Biesbosch resistance and Albrecht intelligence groups who safeguarded the secret connection between occupied and liberated Netherlands. Operating with her colleagues via the waterways of the Biesbosch and the Merwede, she risked her life numerous times to make this line crossing as a courier, transferring vital information to Allied troops under the aliases of “Ice Block” and “Trouble.” While engaged in one of these missions during the winter of 1944–1945, she was permanently partially paralyzed during a fall in which she damaged a cervical vertebra.

Although she frequently traveled alone on her various resistance assignments during the war, she did regularly work for or with several individuals, including: Ad Benne, Carel van de Donck, Daan and Klaas Gielen, Henk Koning, Harrie Roelands, Jan de Swart, and the students known as Duyx and Trimbos.

After her nation was liberated from its German occupiers in May 1945, word of her dangerous exploits spread via newspaper reports, which heralded her valor while also documenting her injury and partial paralysis. Rather than using her birth name, many of those accounts used her resistance name, a practice which would be repeated for much of her post-war life. Her given name was used, however, when she was formally honored by the Dutch government.

== Post-war life and awards ==
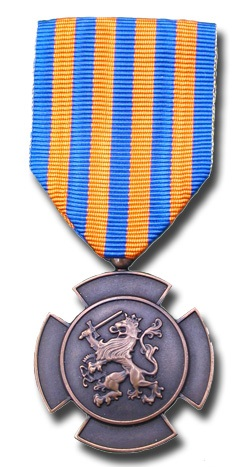
General image of the Bronze Lion (CC By-SA 4.0).

Maria Catharina van Grunsven was twice honored by Dutch royalty following the war. In June 1946, she was received by Queen Wilhelmina of the Netherlands during a personal audience at the Paleis Het Loo (the Het Loo Palace or "Palace of the Woods") in Apeldoorn in early June 1946. According to the Leidsche Courant:

Miss van Grunsven has had a very active share in the resistance movement and, among other things, has done important work as a courier. When the southern part of our country was liberated, she repeatedly visited the area still occupied.

The Queen remembered this very well and with great interest, H.M. [Her Majesty] was informed about what her guest had experienced during the occupation after the liberation. She also learned a great deal about the underground work and about what is now happening in the circles of the former resistance workers. Advised during the audience that Miss van Grunsven's parents had accompanied her on the trip to Apeldoorn, H.M. expressed the desire to meet her parents, and they then also were summoned to the palace.

With this opportunity, the Queen learned about the domestic circumstances of the Grunsven couple, who are farmers in Geffen. Miss Grunsven's mother was then complimented by the Queen for the beautiful Brabant peasant hat she was wearing and for the resistance work of her daughter.

Maria Catharina van Grunsven was then personally presented with the Bronzen Leeuw (the Bronze Lion) by Prince Bernhard of the Netherlands during a medal ceremony in July 1949. According to Haarlems Dagblad:

In Sliedrecht, which occupied the center of the "line crossers" of liberated Netherlands territory in 1944–1945, Prince Bernhard presented the medals to 57 underground fighters the medals.... The State Secretaries of War and Navy, the Commissioner of the Kings in South Holland, General H. J.Kruls and many other military and civil authorities attended the ceremony on a site at the Merwesingel.... He recalled the courageous acts of the resistance.... You are an example to the Dutch people and the whole world.... Among the 57 decorated was Miss M. C. van Grunsven from Geffen (N.-Br.), who successfully performed dangerous assignments in occupied Holland sixteen times in the winter of 1944–1945 before injuring a cervical vertebra on the ice while on a mission in bad weather. Because of this fall she was partially paralyzed. The Prince handed out the awards to her, while she lay on a stretcher, and sat with her for a few moments.

She also began her own family, becoming Riet van de Haterd-van Grunsven, the religious marriage ceremony was being led by the priest she had rescued in 1944.

== Death and burial ==
Riet van de Haterd-Van Grunsven died on 1 March 2004 in 's-Hertogenbosch, North Brabant, Netherlands.

== External resources ==
- Lagrou, Peter. The legacy of Nazi occupation: patriotic memory and national recovery in Western Europe, 1945–1965, pp. 74–77. Cambridge: Cambridge University Press, 2000 ISBN 0-521-65180-8).
- "The Netherlands." Washington, D.C.: United States Holocaust Memorial Museum.
- "The Netherlands: Historical Background." Jerusalem, Israel: Yad Vashem.
- van den Hoek, Piet. Biesbosch-crossings, 1944–1945. Kampen, Netherlands: Kok Voorhoeve, 1993. ISBN 9029711620/ISBN 9789029711623.
