= Cornelis Pieter van den Hoek =

Dutch resistance fighter (1921–2015)

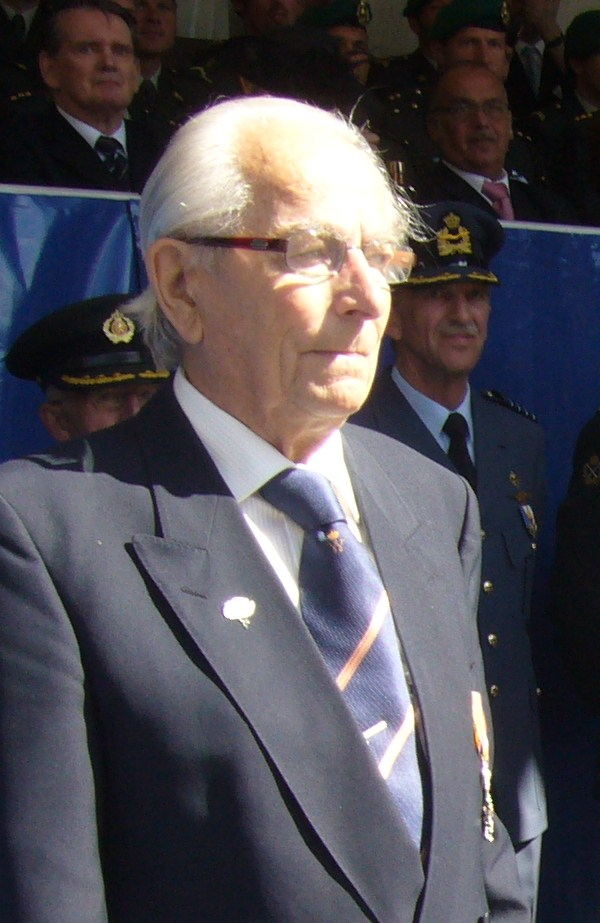
- Van den Hoek at the Binnenhof in The Hague, 29 May 2009
- Born: 7 June 1921; Leerdam, South Holland, Netherlands
- Died: 12 February 2015 (aged 93); Werkendam, North Brabant, Netherlands
- Military career
- Allegiance: Netherlands
- Branch: Dutch resistance
- Service years: 1944–1945
- Awards: Military William Order, Knight 4th class; Order of Orange-Nassau, Knight 5th class; Resistance Memorial Cross

Cornelis Pieter "Piet" van den Hoek (7 June 1921 – 12 February 2015) was a Dutch resistance fighter during World War II. Van den Hoek was one of the few knights of the Dutch Military William Order.

== Resistance fighter ==
In 1942 Van den Hoek was arrested by the Germans and brought to a labor camp in Cologne. During his leave in November 1943 he went into hiding. He found a place to hide on a houseboat in De Biesbosch, where already three others were hiding. They were supplied by the Onderduikersdienst, a service for people that were in hiding. While in hiding he joined the resistance and joined the group 'De Partizanen van de Biesbosch'. He became one of 21 so called line-crossers and, in the words of the royal order:

distinguished himself in battle by committing excellent acts of bravery, planning and loyalty during the end of 1944 and the beginning of 1945, on behalf of the Bureau of Information of the Dutch Government, maintaining a secret connection between occupied and liberated Netherlands across an 18 kilometer long waterway, across the Biesbosch and the Merwede, 37 times rowing across many extremely watchfull enemy posts and patroll boats. Also he distinguished himself, when on one of these trips his boat was sifted through with enemy bullets and he, after having to leave his boat, was arrested by the enemy, escaped within a month, and afterwards again helped maintain the connection by boat between liberated and occupied territory. Finally [he distinguished himself] by, in union with other wellminded Dutch citizens, taking part in the Biesbosch in overpowering and capturing small groups of heavily armed German soldiers, who were afterwards locked up and guarded in motor ships in a secluded part of the Biesbosch.

== Knighthood ==
On 30 October 1948, by Royal Decree, Van den Hoek was knighted by Queen Juliana of the Netherlands, receiving the fourth class (Knight) of the Military William Order. The Order is the highest and oldest military honour of the Kingdom of the Netherlands, bestowed for "performing excellent acts of Bravery, Leadership and Loyalty in battle". The award is comparable to the British Victoria Cross and seldom awarded.

== Awards ==
- Military William Order, Knight 4th class
- Order of Orange-Nassau, Knight 5th class
- Resistance Memorial Cross
