= Villa Mariënhof =

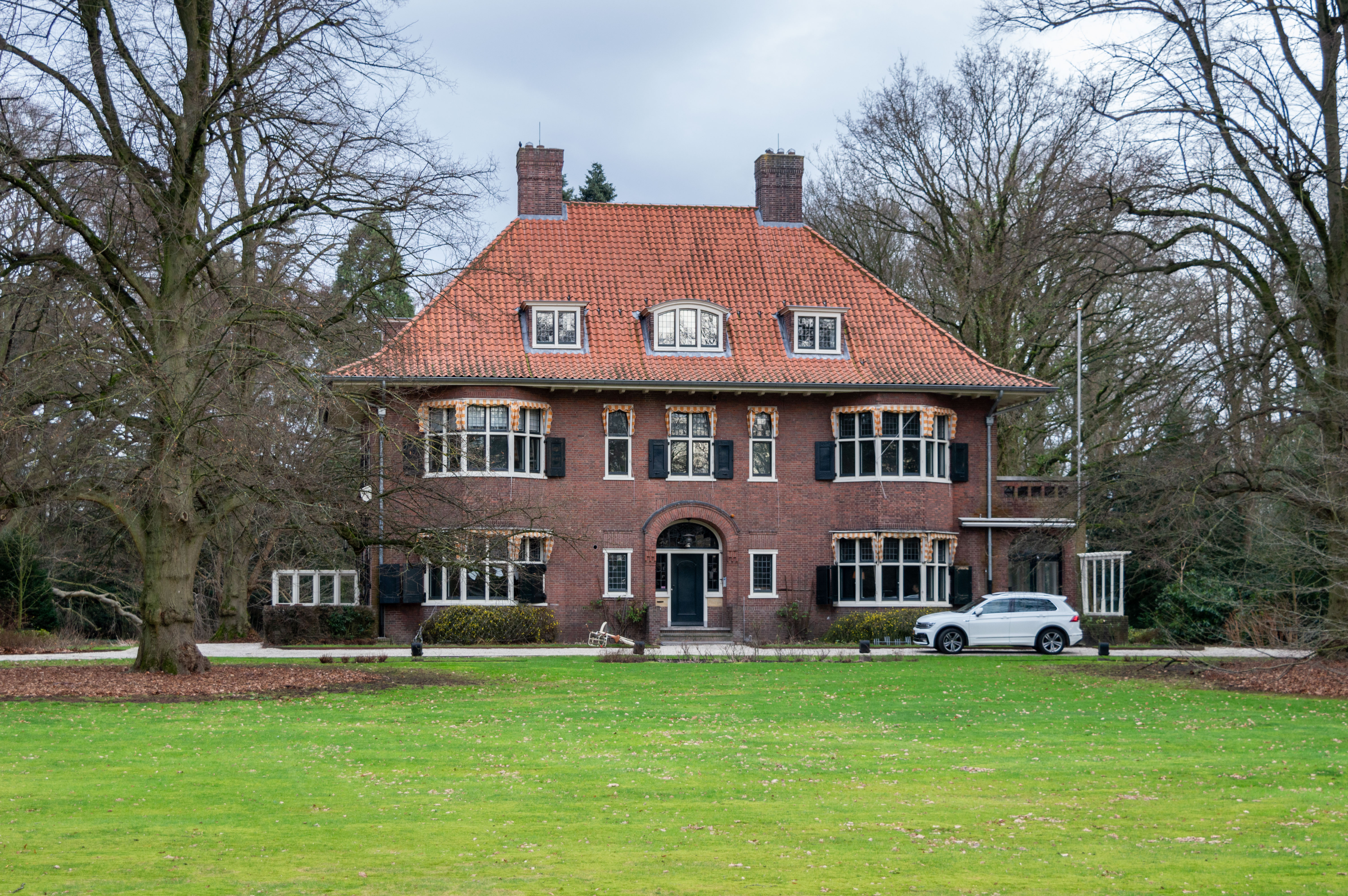
- Front facade, seen from the Bredaseweg

- Location within North Brabant

General information
- Status: In use
- Architectural style: Traditionalism/rationalism
- Location: Tilburg, North Brabant, Bredaseweg 387, Netherlands
- Coordinates: 51°33′29.3″N 5°02′52.0″E
- Construction started: 1916
- Completed: 1918

Technical details
- Floor count: 3 (above ground)

Design and construction
- Architect: Johan Wilhelm Hanrath
- Designations: Rijksmonument (no. 521024, 521025, and 525946)

Villa Mariënhof is a historic mansion with a garden located along the Bredaseweg in the Dutch city Tilburg. It was built between 1916 and 1918 as the residence of the family of a factory owner, and it was designed by Johan Wilhelm Hanrath. In 1986, it was inherited by Staatsbosbeheer, who first used Villa Mariënhof as an office and later rented it. The house itself, its teahouse, and the garden are rijksmonumenten.

== History ==
Villa Mariënhof was constructed between 1916 and 1918 according to a design by architect Johan Wilhelm Hanrath. The client was Jos Janssen, who was the owner of the dyeing factory "De Regenboog" along the Bredaseweg. It was built on the north side of the Bredaseweg, where ribbon development of large detached houses with gardens started to take a hold in the 1930s. The building was renovated after a building permit was granted in 1939. The veranda was turned into a sunroom, and a terrace was added adjacent to it in the front. In 1951, a concrete one-car garage was built on the eastern side of the lot.

The government organization Staatsbosbeheer inherited the property from Charles Janssen, Jos' son, in 1986 with the request to conserve the mansion for at least 25 years. It subsequently served as a regional headquarters for that organization, and it was renovated in the late 1980s, adding among other things a fire escape. Starting in 1997, Staatsbosbeheer rented Villa Mariënhof as a residential unit. The mansion, its garden, and its teahouse became three separate rijksmonumenten in 2002. According to the Rijksdienst voor het Cultureel Erfgoed, the building has cultural-historical importance as it serves as an example of the construction of estates along the arteries entering industrial towns. Furthermore, it has important value within the oeuvre of architects Hanrath and Springer, and its interior and exterior are in a good condition. The roof of Villa Mariënhof was replaced in 2012.

Staatsbosbeheer tried to sell the mansion in 2015 for an asking price of around €950,000, preferably for residential usage and not to a developer. That price did not include the lot on which the mansion stands, as Staatsbosbeheer planned to lease this to a seller (erfpacht). This last condition was later dropped, and the asking price was raised to €1.85 million before it was lowered again to €1.6 million in 2019. Because the estate agent did not manage to sell the property, Staatsbosbeheer dropped the preference for residential usage and a private seller later that year, although the zoning plans still required an alteration to allow for extensions or other uses.

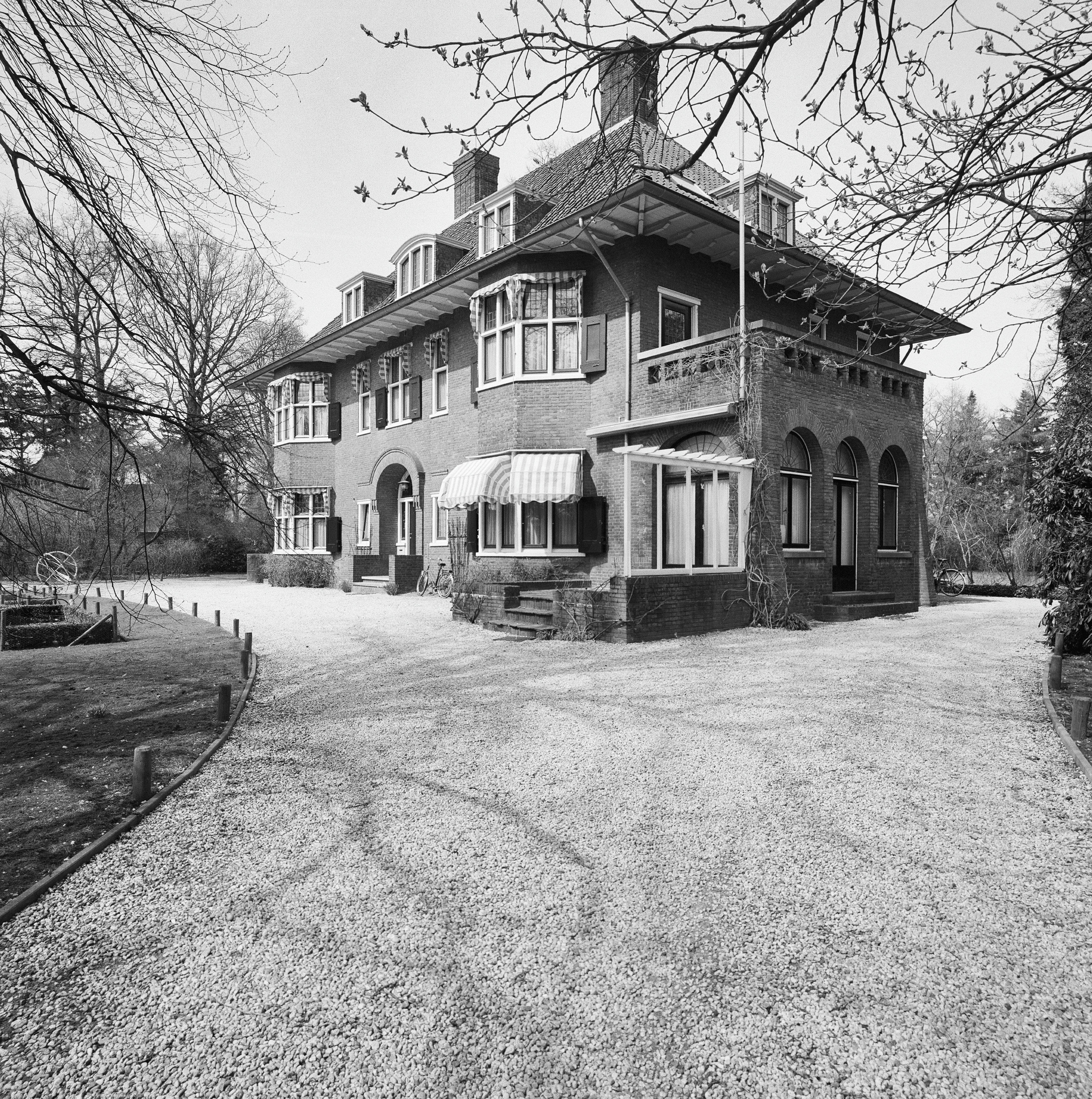
Front and east side facades with the sunroom visible

== Architecture ==
=== Main building ===
The mansion was designed by Johan Wilhelm Hanrath, a Dutch architect from Hilversum, in the traditionalist and rationalist styles. It has two above-ground floors, a basement, and an attic below its hip roof. The roof is covered with red roof tiles, and features two masonry chimneys. The mansion has Flemish bond brickwork.

The front facade is symmetric and consists of three bays. The central porch is topped by a round arch, and it includes a front door made out of oak. The door is flanked by two leaded windows depicting scenes from the textile industry. A leaded window above the door shows Noah's Ark, the dates "1890 - 2 december - 1940" and the signature of stained glass artist Pieter Wiegersma. The porch also features a foundation stone out of sandstone with the inscription "Memorial stone laid by Joseph and Charles Janssen, January 1917". (Note: Original Dutch text: "Gedenksteen is gelegd door Joseph en Charles Janssen, Januari 1917") On both sides, there are canted bay windows, that go from the ground to the roof. Most windows in the front facade are cross-windows and some have shutters. The roof features three dormers.

The east side facade has a sunroom, that used to be a veranda. It is supported by buttresses and features rounded windows. A balcony with a masonry balustrade is located on top of it. Another entrance with a two-step stairs is situated next to the sunroom under a wooden canopy. The west facade is symmetric, and has a terrace with two balustrades. The backside has a door in the middle, that can be reached using two steps. There is a wooden balcony above that door. The back facade has three dormers just like the front facade.

A vestibule with a floor and panelling made out of green marble is located behind the front door. The central hall on the ground floor connects to most rooms including the living room and a drawing room with teak panelling. The ground floor toilet and its passage are decorated with green glazed tiles. Another passage has a backdoor and the entrance to the kitchen, that is fitted with an intercom to deliver messages to the other rooms. The kitchen and scullery have floors with a chessboard pattern and panelling of white glazed tiles with images. Similar tiling can be found around one of the fireplaces as well. The central hall also contains the three-part staircase, that is made out of Scots pine wood and leads to the first floor. This floor and the one above it contain the bedrooms and the bathrooms.

=== Garden and teahouse ===
The forested garden with a size of 18,000 m^{2} (190,000 sq ft) was designed by landscape architect Leonard Springer, who was also responsible for the Leijpark in Tilburg. The English landscape garden was constructed in 1919 and used to have a size of around 25,000 m^{2} (270,000 sq ft). It has two driveways – both with white wooden gates supported by masonry pillars at the road. A lawn is situated in between the two curved driveways. It used to house a sundial. Another lawn is located directly behind the house and is surrounded by weeping beeches, silver lindens, and oak trees. A winding path surrounded by shrubs goes through the garden. When Villa Mariënhof was just completed, it offered vistas of farmlands in the south and forests in the west.

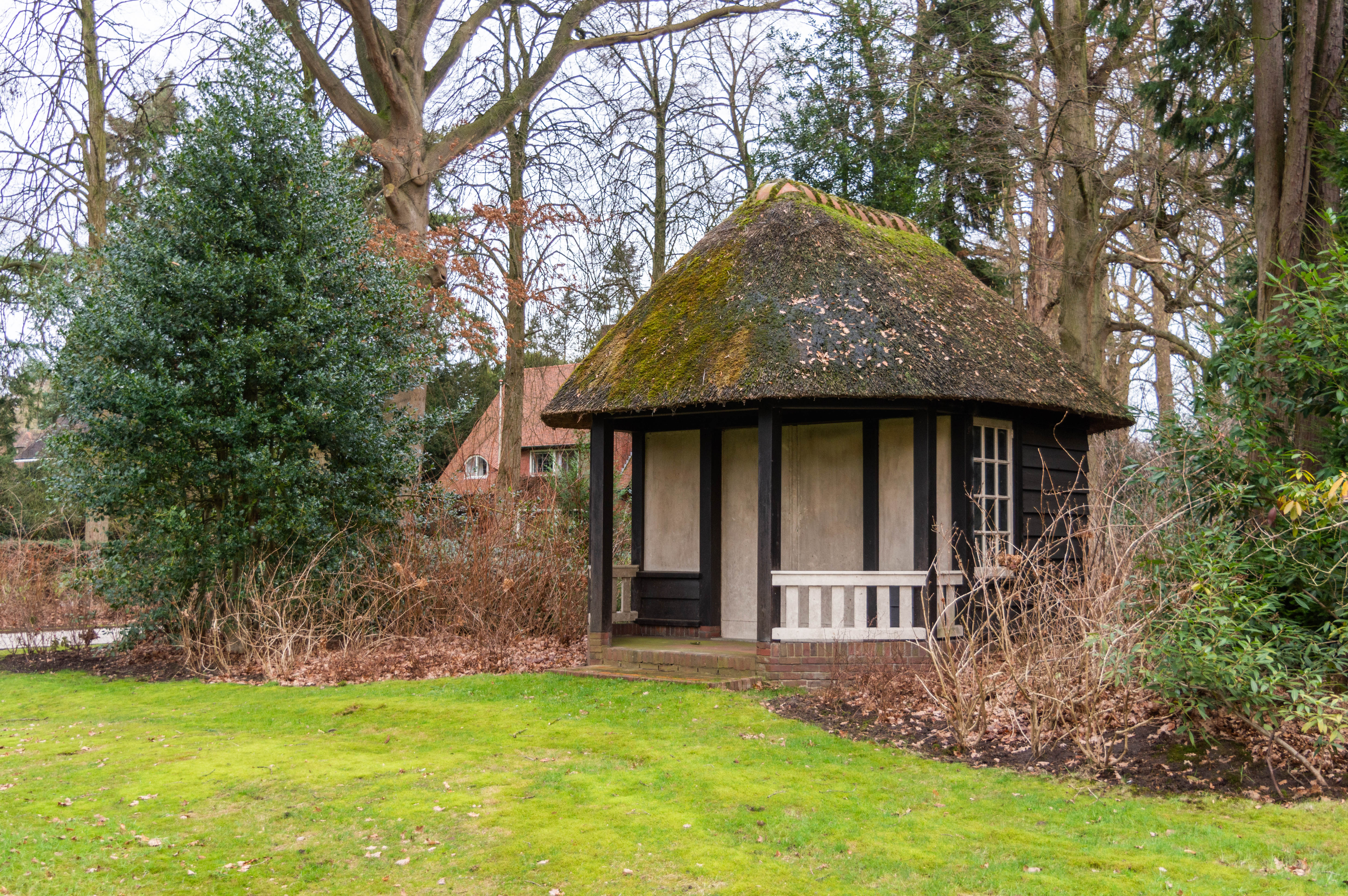
Teahouse, seen from the road

About 15% of the garden was sold around the year 1970 for the development of a new residential area. Because of this, the kitchen garden, the orchard, and the gardener's residence disappeared. The layout of the paths was also adjusted. Bald cypresses, larches, and Douglas firs were planted at the former location of the kitchen garden and orchard. The tennis court was removed in 1980, and trees were placed there as well.

The garden also contains a teahouse situated close to the road. It was designed by Hanrath as well, and the building permit was granted in 1917. The octagonal structure has clapboard siding and a thatched hip roof. The front has a veranda with red tiles, a wooden balustrade, and four columns. In the original design, the entrance of the teahouse, consisting of sliding doors, with windows in the doors and on either side, was located behind the veranda.

== Gallery ==
Drawings of all facades by the architect (1916)

Floor plans by the architect (1916) (Note: During construction, a permit was granted to alter the layout of bedroom 4 and bathroom 1.)
