= Line-crosser =

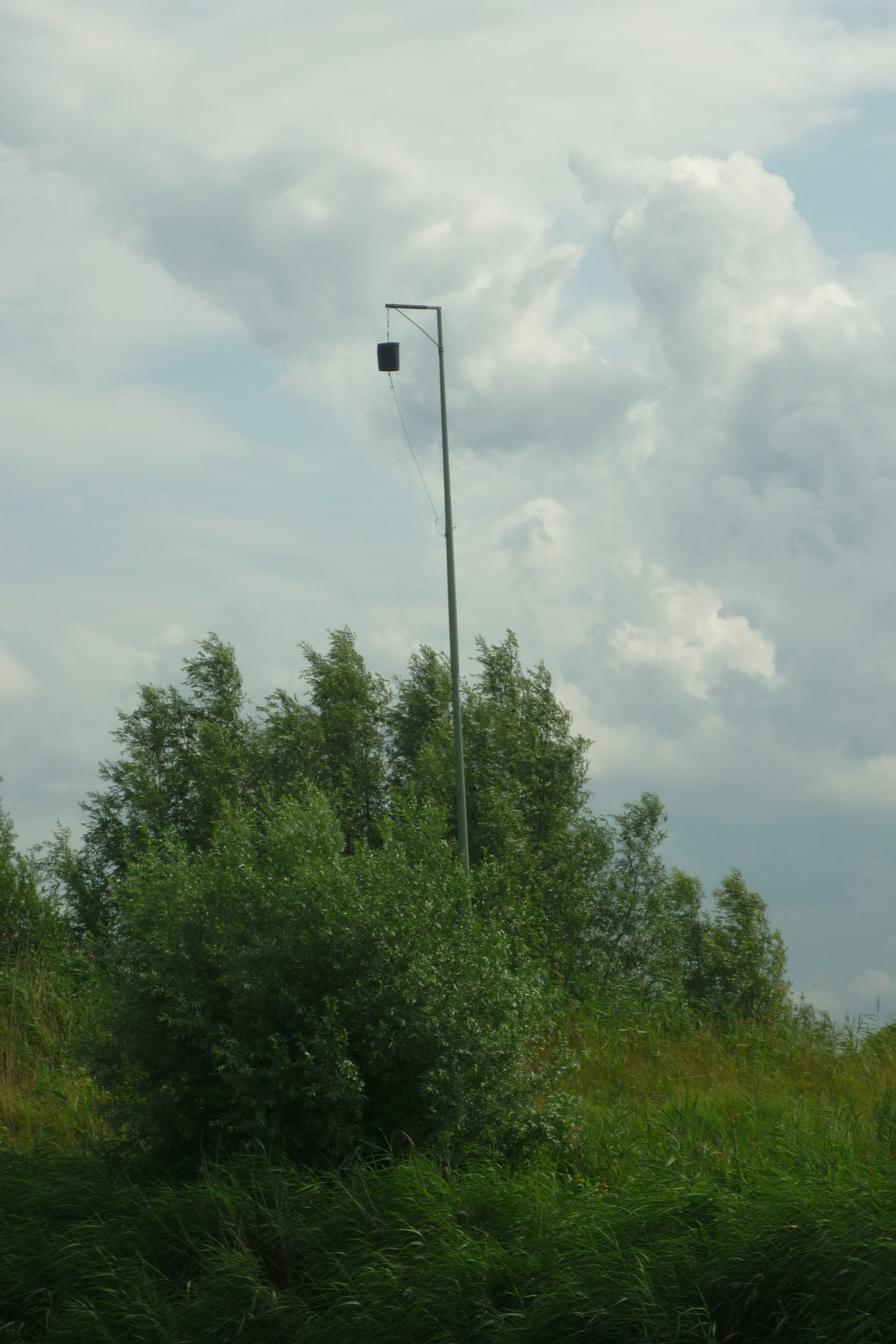
Basket used to indicate that a line-crosser was on the way.

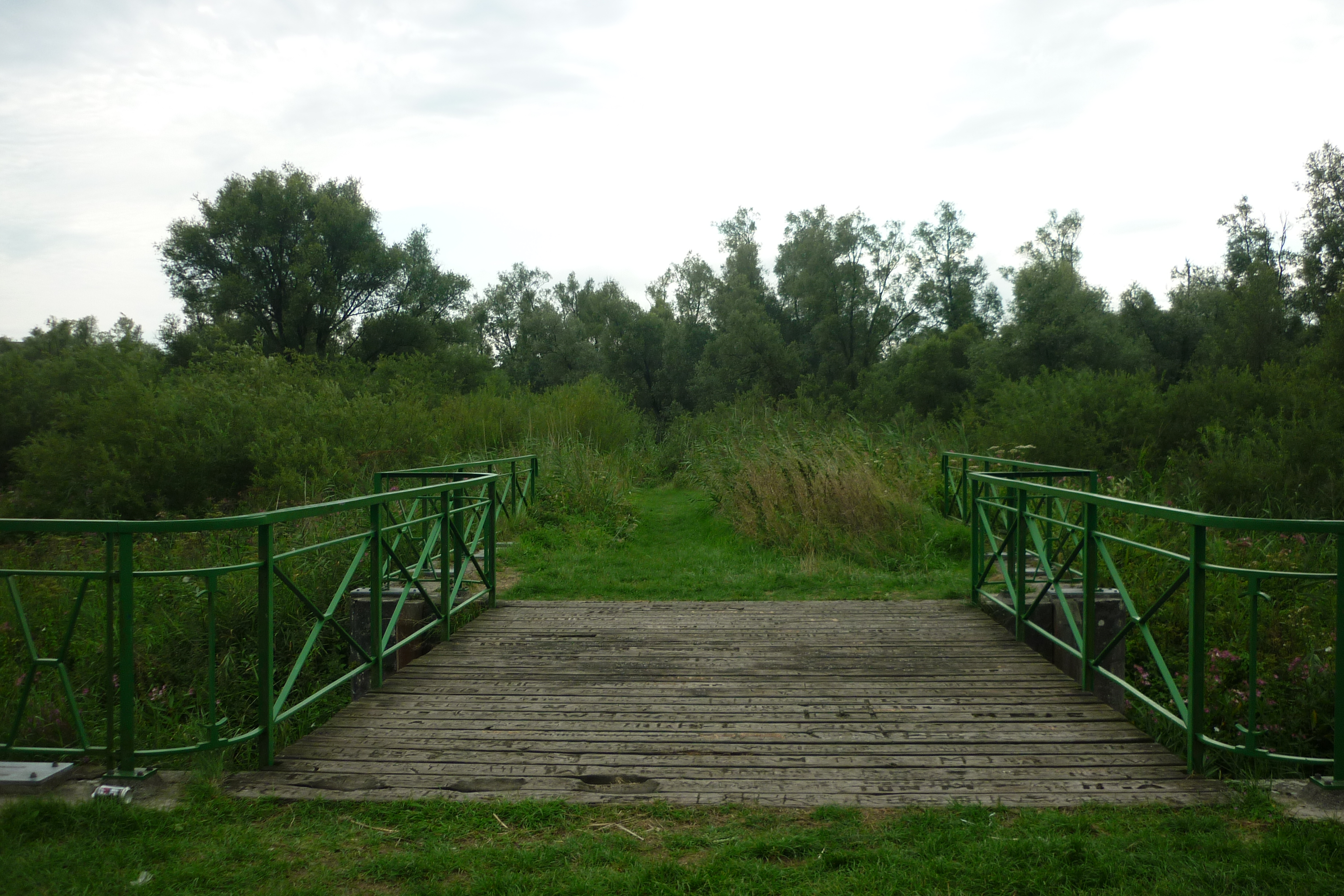
Saint Jan bridge

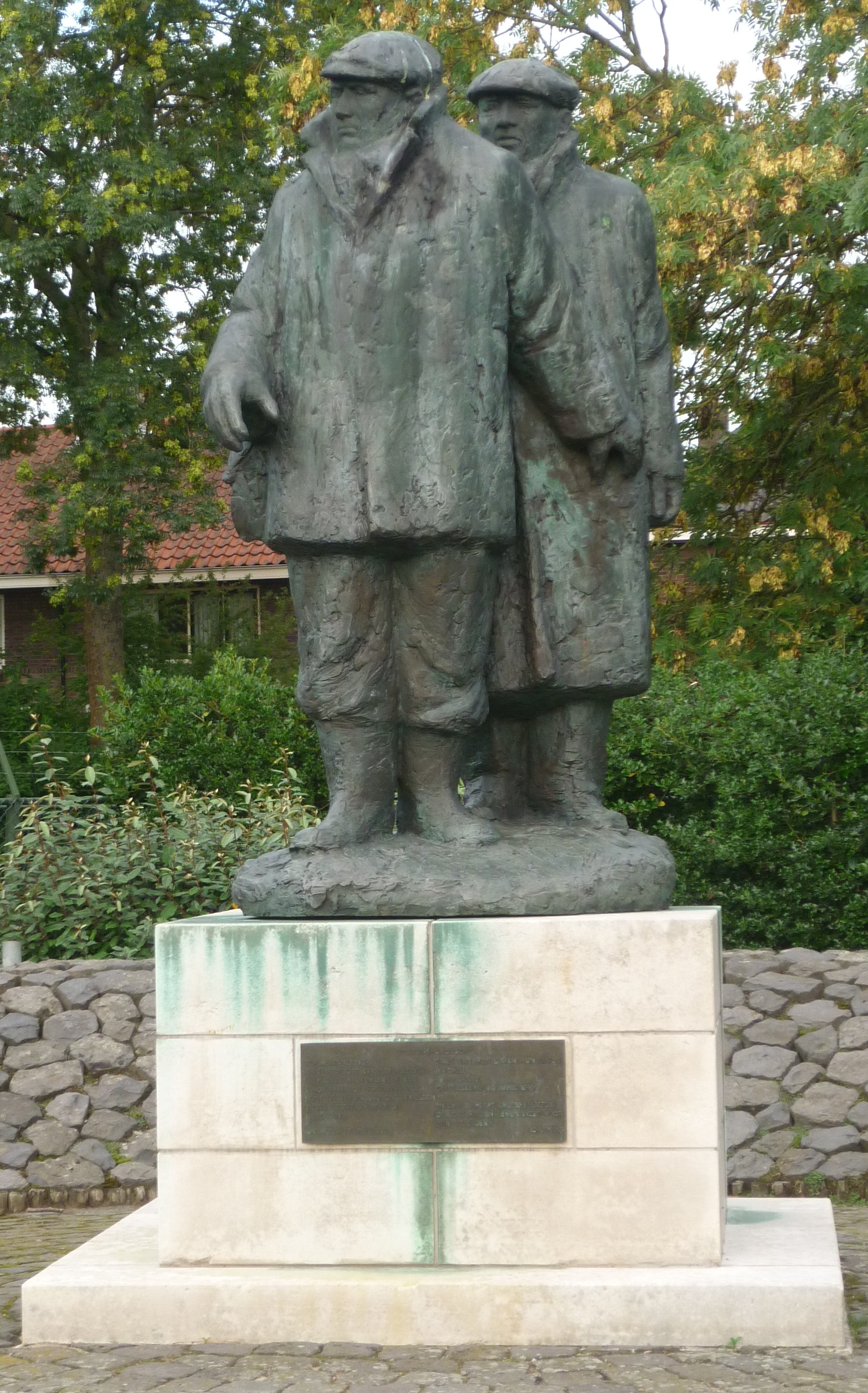
Monument in Werkendam

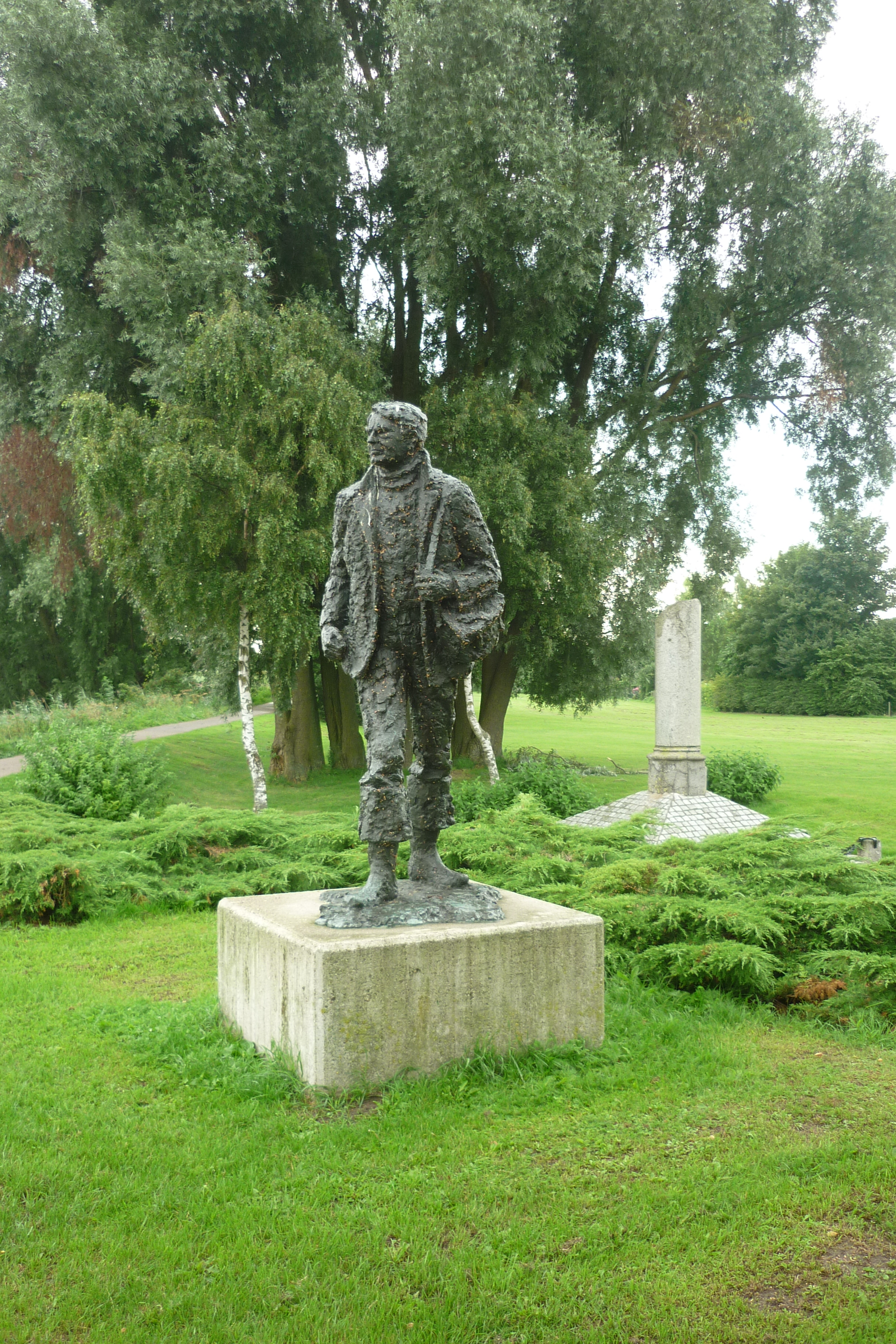
Monument in Lage-Zwaluwe

Line-crosser is a Dutch term from World War II. The name is used to refer to 21 people, mostly from Werkendam, who during the last months of the war maintained a secret connection between occupied and liberated Netherlands across the Biesbosch and the Merwede. They were part of the larger Biesbosch resistance group, and the Albrecht intelligence group.

== History ==
On 6 November 1944 the Biesbosch, a difficult to penetrate area, became the front between the German and allied forces. The Germans would almost never go into this area and as such it was ideal for hideouts for refugees.

Later that month it was decided to create a water crossing in the area between occupied and liberated Netherlands. Across two different routes people, goods, information and medicine were transported. In total 374 crossings were made. It was mostly a military intelligence route, but also Jews and stranded pilots were helped. It is not known how many people were transported. One of the people who crossed was the British general John Hackett who had been wounded during Operation Market Garden. He would later describe his experiences in 1978 in the book 'I was a stranger'.

There were two main routes of 13 and 18 kilometers. Crossing were made in canoes or small boats, mostly rowed or with silent engines. At one of the places they used a raised basket next to a restaurant to indicate that a line-crosser was coming.

During the end of the war, after Dolle Dinsdag, several German troops deserted, mostly across "the bridge of saint Jan". These were often captured and at one point around 75 German soldiers were held for 8 weeks on boats in the area. These were later handed over to Polish allied forces who liberated the area.

== List of line-crossers ==
All 21 line-crosser were decorated after the war:

=== Military William Order 4th class ===
- Arie van Driel, posthumously, he made 53 crossings
- Kees van de Sande, posthumously
- Jan de Landgraaf
- Cornelis Pieter van den Hoek. He made 37 crossings. Van den Hoek was the last living line-crosser, and member of the Military William Order.

=== Bronze Lion ===
- Jacobus Bakker
- Cornelis Leendert Bolijn
- Pieter van Dam
- Desiderius Hubertus van Gool
- Maria Catharina van Grunsven
- Jacobus Cornelis Hoevenaar
- Franciscus Johannes Maria Hoffmans
- Albert Kunst
- Jacobus Meyer
- Johannes Rombouts
- Cornelis Visser
- Jan Visser

=== Bronze Cross ===
- Leendert Gerardus van Beugen
- Arie de Boon
- Cornelis de Boon
- Cor Hoekstra
- Adriaan de Keijzer
- Leendert van Kempen
- Willem van Veen

== Names of people transported ==
People were transported both in and out of occupied Netherlands. Not many names are known. The following agents crossed from occupied into liberated territory:

- Theodorus Bernardus Bleeker
- Stephan Marie Claessens
- Dirk Dral
- Jan Willem van Driel
- Riet van Grunsven
- Ivan Brooks Hollomon, pilote
- Adriaan de Keizer

== After the war ==
=== Reunions ===
On Tuesday 4 December 1984 about 50 people of the Biesbosch resistance group meet. One of the people present was prince Bernhard of Lippe-Biesterfeld. There were commemorative meetings in 2010 and 2011.

=== Monuments ===
On the bridge of saint Jan is a memorial text. There are several monuments dedicated to the Line-crossers, most prominently in Werkendam, Hank, Lage Zwaluwe and Sliedrecht.
