= Boston Herald =

US newspaper

- Cover from February 3, 2013
- Type: Daily newspaper
- Format: Tabloid
- Owner: Digital First Media
- Publisher: Kevin Corrado
- Editor: Joe Dwinell
- Founded: 1846 (180 years ago)
- Political alignment: Conservative
- Headquarters: 100 Grossman Dr. 4th Floor; Braintree, Massachusetts 02184; United States
- Circulation: 13,092 print 27,894 digital (as of 2023)
- ISSN: 0738-5854
- OCLC number: 643304073
- Website: bostonherald.com

The Boston Herald is an American conservative daily newspaper whose primary market is Boston, Massachusetts, and its surrounding area. It was founded in 1846 and is one of the oldest daily newspapers in the United States. It has been awarded eight Pulitzer Prizes in its history, including four for editorial writing and three for photography before it was converted to tabloid format in 1981.

In December 2017, the Herald filed for bankruptcy. On February 14, 2018, Digital First Media successfully bid $11.9 million to purchase the company in a bankruptcy auction; the acquisition was completed on March 19, 2018. As of August 2018, the paper had approximately 110 total employees, compared to about 225 before the sale.

== History ==
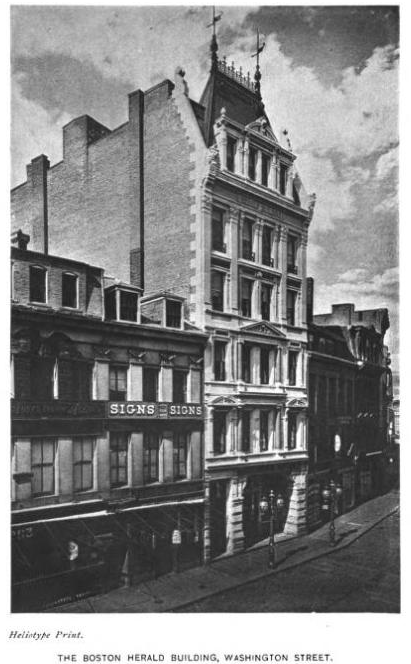
The old Herald headquarters, built in 1878, at 255 Washington Street

The Herald's history traces back through two lineages, the Daily Advertiser and the old Boston Herald, and two media moguls, William Randolph Hearst and Rupert Murdoch.

=== Founding ===
The original Boston Herald was founded in 1846 by a group of Boston printers jointly under the name of John A. French & Company. The paper was published as a single two-sided sheet, selling for one cent. Its first editor, William O. Eaton, just 22 years old, said "The Herald will be independent in politics and religion; liberal, industrious, enterprising, critically concerned with literacy and dramatic matters, and diligent in its mission to report and analyze the news, local and global."

In 1847, the Boston Herald absorbed the Boston American Eagle.

=== The Boston Herald and Boston Journal ===
In October 1917, John H. Higgins, the publisher and treasurer of the Boston Herald bought out its next door neighbor The Boston Journal and created The Boston Herald and Boston Journal

=== The American Traveler ===
Even earlier than the Herald, the weekly American Traveler was founded in 1825 as a bulletin for stagecoach listings.

=== The Boston Evening Traveller ===
The Boston Evening Traveler was founded in 1845. The Boston Evening Traveler was the successor to the weekly American Traveler and the semi-weekly Boston Traveler. In 1912, the Herald acquired the Traveler, continuing to publish both under their own names. For many years, the newspaper was controlled by many of the investors in United Shoe Machinery Corporation. After a newspaper strike in 1967, Herald-Traveler Corp. suspended the afternoon Traveler and absorbed the evening edition into the Herald to create the Boston Herald Traveler.

=== The Boston Daily Advertiser ===
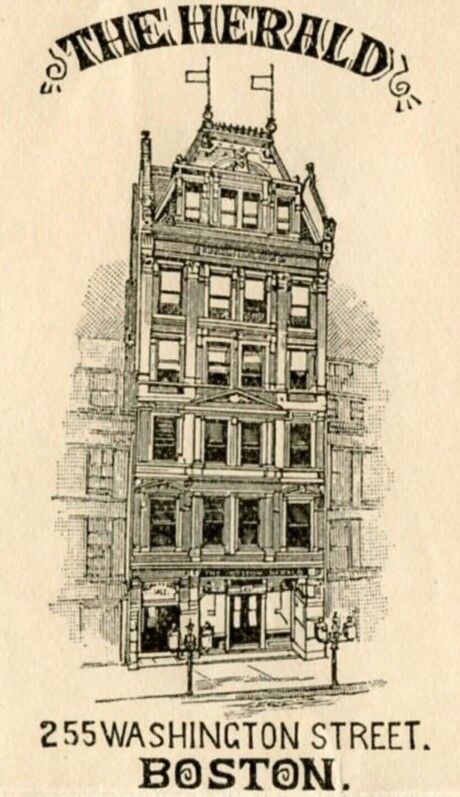
The Boston Herald Building about 1900

The Boston Daily Advertiser was established in 1813 in Boston by Nathan Hale. The paper grew to prominence throughout the 19th century, taking over other Boston area papers. In 1832 The Advertiser took over control of The Boston Patriot, and then in 1840 it took over and absorbed The Boston Gazette. The paper was purchased by William Randolph Hearst in 1917. In 1920 the Advertiser was merged with The Boston Record, initially the combined newspaper was called the Boston Advertiser however when the combined newspaper became an illustrated tabloid in 1921 it was renamed The Boston American. Hearst Corp. continued using the name Advertiser for its Sunday paper until the early 1970s.

=== The Boston Record ===
On September 3, 1884, The Boston Evening Record was started by the Boston Advertiser as a campaign newspaper. The Record was so popular that it was made a permanent publication.

=== The Boston American ===
In 1904, William Randolph Hearst began publishing his own newspaper in Boston called The American. Hearst ultimately ended up purchasing the Daily Advertiser in 1917. By 1938, the Daily Advertiser had changed to the Daily Record, and The American had become the Sunday Advertiser. A third paper owned by Hearst, called the Afternoon Record, which had been renamed the Evening American, merged in 1961 with the Daily Record to form the Record American. The Sunday Advertiser and Record American would ultimately be merged in 1972 into The Boston Herald Traveler a line of newspapers that stretched back to the old Boston Herald.

=== The Boston Herald Traveler ===
In 1946, Herald-Traveler Corporation acquired Boston radio station WHDH. Two years later, WHDH-FM was licensed, and on November 26, 1957, WHDH-TV made its debut as an ABC affiliate on channel 5. In 1961, WHDH-TV's affiliation switched to CBS. The television station operated for years beginning some time after under temporary authority from the Federal Communications Commission. Controversy arose over luncheon meetings the newspaper's chief executive purportedly had with John C. Doerfer, chairman of the FCC between 1957 and 1960, who served as a commissioner during the original licensing process. (Some Boston broadcast historians accuse The Boston Globe of being covertly behind the proceeding as a sort of vendetta for not getting a license—The Herald Traveler was Republican in sympathies, and the Globe then had a firm policy of not endorsing political candidates, although Doerfer's history at the FCC also lent suspicions.) The FCC ordered comparative hearings, and in 1969 a competing applicant, Boston Broadcasters, Inc., was granted a construction permit to replace WHDH-TV on channel 5. Herald-Traveler Corporation fought the decision in court—by this time, revenues from channel 5 were all but keeping the newspaper afloat—but lost its final appeal. On March 19, 1972, WHDH-TV was forced to surrender channel 5 to the new WCVB-TV.

=== The Boston Herald Traveler and Record American ===
Without a television station to subsidize the newspaper, the Herald Traveler was no longer able to remain in business, and the newspaper was sold to Hearst Corporation, which published the rival all-day newspaper, the Record American. The two papers were merged to become an all-day paper called the Boston Herald Traveler and Record American in the morning and Record American and Boston Herald Traveler in the afternoon. The first editions published under the new combined name were those of June 19, 1972. The afternoon edition was soon dropped and the unwieldy name shortened to Boston Herald American, with the Sunday edition called the Sunday Herald Advertiser. The Herald American was printed in broadsheet format, and failed to target a particular readership; where the Record American had been a typical city tabloid, the Herald Traveler was a Republican paper.

=== Murdoch purchases The Herald American ===
The Herald American converted to tabloid format in September 1981, but Hearst faced steep declines in circulation and advertising. The company announced it would close the Herald American—making Boston a one-newspaper town—on December 3, 1982. When the deadline came, Australian-born media baron Rupert Murdoch was negotiating to buy the paper and save it. He closed on the deal after 31 hours of talks with Hearst and newspaper unions—and five hours after Hearst had sent out notices to newsroom employees telling them they were terminated. The newspaper announced its own survival the next day with a full-page headline: "You Bet We're Alive!"

=== The Boston Herald ===
Murdoch changed the paper's name back to the Boston Herald. The Herald continued to grow, expanding its coverage and increasing its circulation until 2001, when nearly all newspapers fell victim to declining circulations and revenue.

=== Independent ownership ===
In February 1994, Murdoch's News Corporation was forced to sell the paper, in order that its subsidiary Fox Television Stations could legally consummate its purchase of Fox affiliate WFXT (Channel 25) because Massachusetts Senator Ted Kennedy included language in an appropriations bill barring one company from owning a newspaper and television station in the same market. Patrick J. Purcell, who was the publisher of the Boston Herald and a former News Corporation executive, purchased the Herald and established it as an independent newspaper. Several years later, Purcell would give the Herald a suburban presence it never had by purchasing the money-losing Community Newspaper Company from Fidelity Investments. Although the companies merged under the banner of Herald Media, Inc., the suburban papers maintained their distinct editorial and marketing identity.

After years of operating profits at Community Newspaper and losses at the Herald, Purcell in 2006 sold the suburban chain to newspaper conglomerate Liberty Group Publishing of Illinois, which soon after changed its name to GateHouse Media. The deal, which also saw GateHouse acquiring The Patriot Ledger and The Enterprise respectively in south suburban Quincy and Brockton, netted $225 million for Purcell, who vowed to use the funds to clear the Herald's debt and reinvest in the Paper.

=== Boston Herald Radio ===
On August 5, 2013, the Herald launched an internet radio station named Boston Herald Radio, which includes shows hosted by much of the Herald staff. The station's morning lineup is simulcast on 830 AM WCRN from 10 am Eastern time to 12 noon Eastern time.

=== Bankruptcy ===
In December 2017, the Herald announced plans to sell itself to GateHouse Media after filing for chapter 11 bankruptcy protection. The deal was scheduled to be completed by February 2018, with the new company streamlining and having layoffs in coming months. However, in early January 2018, another potential buyer, Revolution Capital Group of Los Angeles, filed a bid with the federal bankruptcy court; the Herald reported in a press release that "the court requires BHI [Boston Herald, Inc.] to hold an auction to allow all potential buyers an opportunity to submit competing offers."

=== Digital First Media acquisition ===
In February 2018, acquisition of the Herald by Digital First Media for almost $12 million was approved by the bankruptcy court judge in Delaware. The new owner, DFM, said they would be keeping 175 of the approximately 240 employees the Herald had when it sought bankruptcy protection in December 2017. The acquisition was completed on March 19, 2018.

The Herald and parent DFM were criticized for ending the ten-year printing contract with competitor The Boston Globe, moving printing from Taunton, Massachusetts, to Rhode Island and its "dehumanizing cost-cutting efforts" in personnel. In June, some design and advertising layoffs were expected, with work moving to a sister paper, The Denver Post. The "consolidation" took effect in August, with nine jobs eliminated.

In late August 2018, it was announced that the Herald would move its offices from Boston's Seaport District to Braintree, Massachusetts, in late November or early December.

On October 27, 2020, the Boston Herald endorsed Donald Trump for the 2020 U.S. Presidential Election.

In July 2024, the newspaper laid off three employees. It is not publicly known how many people still work at the Boston Herald, but the newsroom in 2020 consisted of 24 employees. A few years prior, the paper employed 240 people.

== Awards ==
- 1924. Pulitzer Prizes for Editorial Writing, Frank W. Buxton, "Who Made Coolidge?"
- 1927. Pulitzer Prizes for Editorial Writing, F. Lauriston Bullard, "We Submit"
- 1948. Pulitzer Prizes for Photography, Frank Cushing, "Boy Gunman and Hostage"
- 1949. Pulitzer Prizes for Editorial Writing, John H. Crider
- 1954. Pulitzer Prizes for Editorial Writing, Don Murray, series of editorials on the “New Look” in National Defense
- 1957. Pulitzer Prizes for Photography, Harry A. Trask. The sinking of the liner SS Andrea Doria in July 1956 (the pictures were taken from an airplane flying at a height of 75 feet (23 m) 9 minutes before the ship plunged to the bottom. The second picture in the sequence is cited as the key photograph.)
- 1976. Pulitzer Prizes for Spot News Photography, Stanley Forman, for Fire Escape Collapse, a dramatic shot of a young woman and child falling as the fire escape to which they had fled during an apartment house fire collapsed on July 22, 1975
- 1977. Pulitzer Prizes for Spot News Photography, Stanley Forman, for The Soiling of Old Glory, as Ted Landsmark, an African American civil rights lawyer, was charged at by a protester with an American flag during the Boston busing crisis
- 1979. Pulitzer Prizes for Feature Photography, staff photographers, for photographic coverage of The Blizzard of 1978
- 2006. Society of American Business Editors and Writers (SABEW) Award as "Business winners" for "overall excellence" coverage
- 2006. Society of American Business Editors and Writers (SABEW) Award as "Business winners" for "Breaking News" coverage of the takeover of the Boston-based Gillette Company by Procter & Gamble

== Columnists ==
- Joe Battenfeld is the Herald's political columnist and multi-media reporter.
- Ron Borges was a sports columnist.
- Warren T. Brookes was an economics reporter at The Herald from 1975 until 1985, when he moved to the Detroit News but based in Washington, D.C.
- Steve Buckley was a longtime sports columnist.
- Gerry Callahan is a sports columnist and a longtime former talk show host for WEEI until he was let go for poor ratings.
- Howie Carr writes about local politics, and is a radio talk show host and frequent TV commentator.
- Bill Cunningham (sports writer) (1895–1961), highest paid sportswriter of his time
- George Frazier's Sweet and Lowdown column debuted on January 27, 1942, and may have been the first jazz column in a big-city American newspaper. Besides jazz, Frazier's column covered books, sports, the media, night life, popular and classical culture, and other topics.
- Peter Gelzinis is a longtime metro columnist, as is Joe Fitzgerald, who was formerly a sports columnist.
- Michael Graham is an op-ed columnist for the Boston Herald.
- George Edward Kimball was a sports columnist best known for his coverage of boxing.
- Olivia Vanni writes the Herald's Inside Track and covers celebrity news.
- Peter Lucas was a longtime political columnist and reporter
- Bob McGovern was the Herald's legal columnist and also worked as a reporter.
- Kevin Mannix - sports journalist, Patriots Beat reporter, columnist.
- Leo Monahan – sports journalist who wrote for the Daily Record, the Record American and the Herald American
- Joe Sciacca is the paper's editor-in-chief. Sciacca is a former political reporter and columnist.

== See also ==
- The Boston Daily Advertiser
- The Boston Journal
- The Boston News-Letter
- The Boston Evening Transcript
- The Boston Globe
- The Boston Post
- Lillian A. Lewis, Boston's first African-American woman journalist
- Frances Sweeney of the Boston Herald Rumor Clinic
- Murphy v. Boston Herald, Inc., et al.
