= Fire Escape Collapse =

1976 photograph by Stanley Forman

Coordinates: 42°21′12.6″N 71°04′40.8″W

Fire Escape Collapse

Fire Escape Collapse, also known as Fire on Marlborough Street, is a monochrome photograph by Stanley Forman which received the Pulitzer Prize for Spot News Photography in 1976 and the title of World Press Photo of the Year. The photograph, which is part of a series, shows 19-year-old Diana Bryant and her two-year-old goddaughter Tiare Jones falling from the collapsed fire escape of a burning apartment building on Marlborough Street in Boston on July 22, 1975. The fire escape at the fifth floor collapsed as a turntable ladder on a fire truck was being extended to pick up the two at the height of approximately 50 feet (15 meters).

The photo was taken with a motorized camera and also shows falling potted plants, as well as pieces of the collapsed fire escape. Other photos of the series show Bryant and Jones waiting for a turntable ladder and the moment of the fire escape's collapse with both victims on it. Published originally in the Boston Herald American, the photo was published in more than 100 newspapers and resulted in the adoption of new fire escape legislation in the United States.

== The incident ==
On July 22, 1975, a fire broke out at an apartment block in Marlborough Street, Boston. The tillerman of the first Boston Fire Department ladder company to arrive at the scene, Robert O'Neill, climbed onto the roof of the building and saw 19-year-old Diana Bryant and her two-year-old goddaughter Tiare Jones standing on the fire escape. O'Neill asked Bryant to lift Jones to him, but as she was unable to do so he jumped down to assist the pair. O'Neill had one arm around Bryant and one hand on a rung of a fire engine's ladder when the fire escape collapsed; O'Neill managed to hang on to the ladder with one hand and was rescued, but Bryant and Jones fell approximately 50 feet (15 meters).

Bryant sustained multiple head and body injuries and died hours later. Jones survived the fall as she had landed on Bryant, softening the impact. Joe Green, a helicopter pilot who provided traffic reports and landed on a nearby roof, reportedly offered to pick up Bryant and Jones, but received no response from O'Neill. The Boston Police Department obtained an arrest warrant for the building's owner, Fred Durham, for trash fires behind the building. A police complaint charged Durham with keeping an unlicensed lodging house. Three trash fires behind the building were reported in the weeks preceding the accident.

== Forman's recollection ==
Recalling the accident, Stanley Forman said he was about to leave the office of the Boston Herald when, after a call about a fire, he rushed to the scene, following one of the fire engines. Hearing yelling for a ladder truck, Forman ran to the back of the burning building, where he saw Bryant and Jones on the fire escape. Because of the heat of the fire behind, Bryant and Jones were "basically leaning" at the point farthest from the building. Forman then took a position where he could photograph what he thought was "an impending routine rescue" in his own words. After the fire escape collapse, Forman acknowledged: "It dawned on me what was happening and I didn't want to see them hit the ground. I can still remember turning around and shaking". Forman, however, noted he was unable to see the moment Bryant and Jones hit the ground "as they fell behind a fence where the bins were".

== Publication and impact on policy ==
This photograph and others from the incident were originally published in the Boston Herald. Forman made a set of prints for the Associated Press, which distributed the photo to 128 U.S. newspapers and those in several foreign countries.

Within 24 hours, action was taken in Boston to improve the safety of all fire escapes in the city. Fire safety groups used the photos to promote similar efforts in other U.S. cities.

== Awards ==
- 1975: World Press Photo of the Year
- 1976: Pulitzer Prize for Spot News Photography

== See also ==
- List of photographs considered the most important
