= ANSI/ISEA 110-2003 =

ANSI/ISEA 110-2003, the American National Standard for Air-Purifying Respiratory Protective Smoke Escape Devices was established to define test criteria and approval methods for fire/smoke escape hoods published by the American National Standards Institute (ANSI). ANSI/ISEA 110 provides design guidance to Respiratory Protective Smoke Escape Devices (RPED) manufacturers in the form of a detailed set of performance requirements and testing procedures. Key sections of the standard cover certification, labeling, design, performance, conditioning and testing requirements.

== History ==
ANSI/ISEA 110 was prepared by members of the International Safety Equipment Association (ISEA) RPED Group, in consultation with testing laboratories and was reviewed by a consensus panel representing users, health and safety professionals and government representatives.

ANSI/ISEA Standard 110 contains general requirements for certification – including ISO registration for the manufacturer, independent process and quality control audits and follow-up inspection programs – and a comprehensive schedule of performance requirements and associated test methods.

The U.S. Consumer Product Safety Commission is using ANSI/ISEA 110 as the benchmark in their testing of fire escape masks, stating on their website, “Emergency escape masks have the potential to reduce consumer-related deaths and injuries by assisting in egress from fires, provided they perform effectively and reliably.”

== Standard specifications ==
Escape hoods that are certified to ANSI/ISEA 110 will provide the specified level of protection to escape from the byproducts of fire including particulate matter, carbon monoxide, other toxic gases and the effects of radiant heat.

To earn certification, the escape hood must meet specified requirements for physical characteristics. Escape hoods are tested for donning, optical properties, corrosion resistance and proving the operational packaging does not leak. During the certification process random samples are conditioned by exposure to vibration, puncture and tear, and extremes of pressure and temperature. Dynamic performance requirements including a carbon dioxide check, breathing resistance, particulate filtration and total inward leakage as a measure of overall performance. Specific tests are made to prove resistance to defined thermal threats including inhalation temperature, soot particulate, flammability, molten polymeric drip resistance and radiant heat resistance. The devices are tested with a series of chemical gases, including: carbon monoxide, hydrogen cyanide, sulfur dioxide, hydrogen chloride, acrolein, and cyclohexane. These gases include those that are toxic byproducts of combustion and those that are effective indicators of performance against an entire class of gases.

== See also ==
- Safety Equipment Institute
- Respirator
