= Ted Landsmark =

American educator and attorney (born 1946)

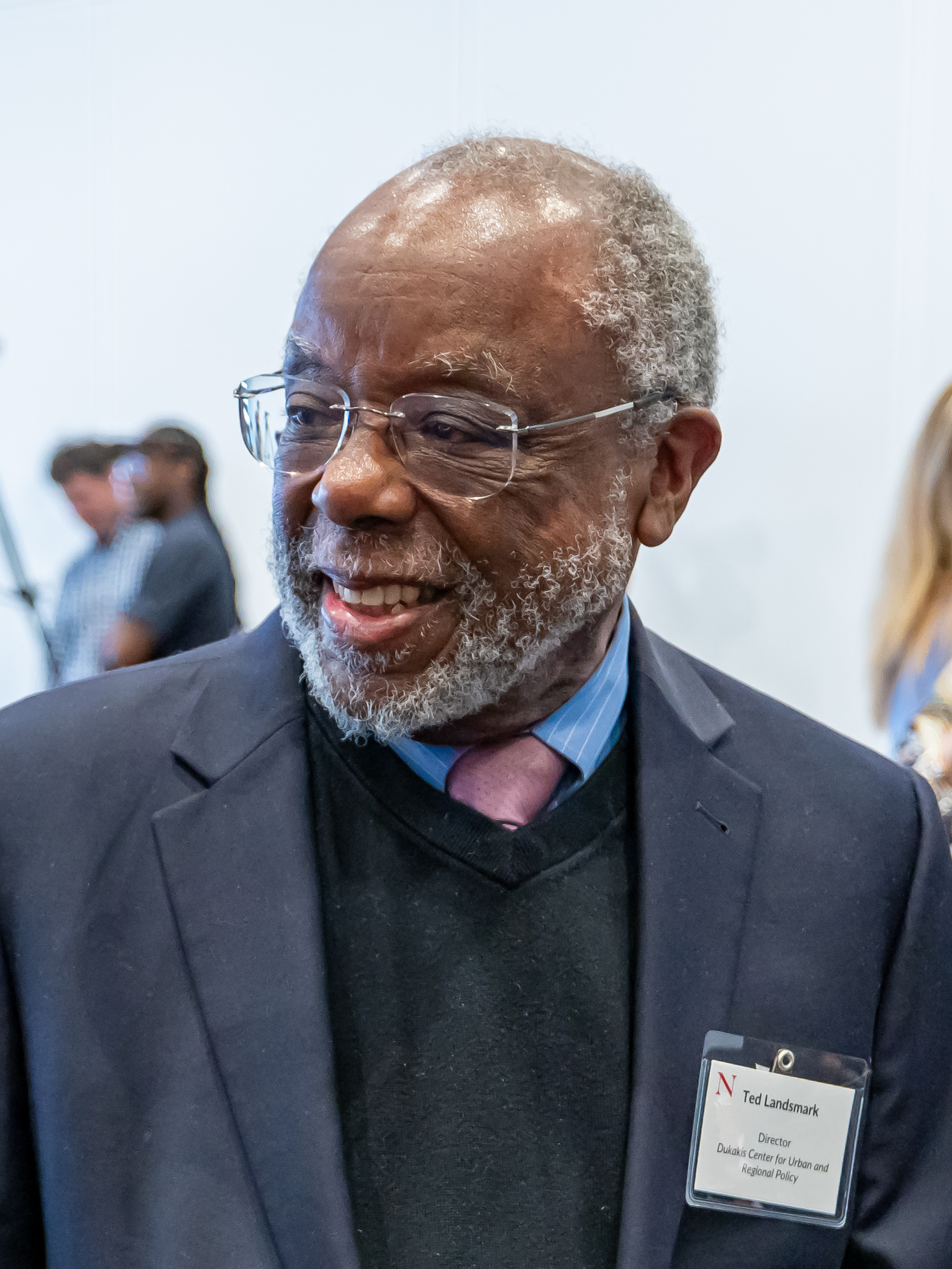
- Landsmark in 2024
- Born: Theodore Augustus Burrell; May 17, 1946 (age 80); Kansas City, Missouri, U.S.
- Education: Yale University (BA, MED, JD); Boston University (PhD)
- Occupations: Educator; Attorney

Theodore "Ted" Carlisle Landsmark (born May 17, 1946) is an American educator and lawyer. Landsmark is a distinguished public policy and urban affairs professor and director of the Kitty and Michael Dukakis Center for Urban and Regional Policy at Northeastern University. His research interests include diversity in design, environmental design, design education, higher education administration, community-based economic development, public policy, historic preservation, and African American art and artisanry.

== Career ==
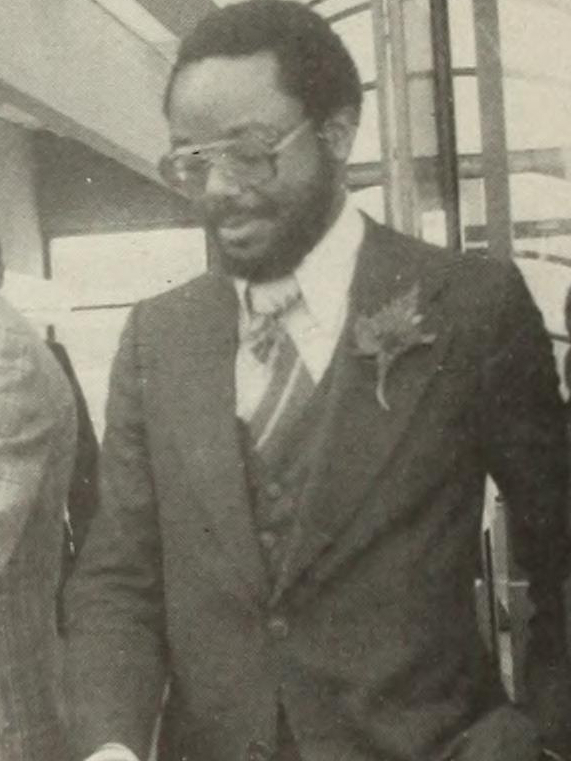
Landsmark in 1979

Born in Kansas City, Landsmark moved to East Harlem, New York, before beginning his schooling. He attended Stuyvesant High School in New York and St. Paul's School in New Hampshire and earned his Bachelor of Arts, Master of Environmental Design, and Juris Doctor, all from Yale University. He was a political editor for the Yale Daily News and was part of the Aurelian Honor Society. He then received his Doctor of Philosophy from Boston University in American and New England Studies. Landsmark has received fellowships from the Museum of Early Southern Decorative Arts and the National Science Foundation.

Landsmark served as president of Boston Architectural College from 1997 to 2014 and as chief academic officer at the American College of the Building Arts from 2015 to 2017. He has also been a faculty member at the Massachusetts College of Art, the Massachusetts Institute of Technology, Harvard University, and the University of Massachusetts Boston.

Landsmark has also served as a trustee for numerous arts-related organizations in Boston, including the Museum of Fine Arts, Boston, the New England Foundation for the Arts, Historic New England, the Institute of Contemporary Art, Boston (whose board he chaired), the Design Futures Council, and the Norman B. Leventhal Map Center. In 2014, Mayor Marty Walsh named him to the Boston Planning and Development Agency board of directors.

== The Soiling of Old Glory ==
Landsmark is widely known for being the subject of the famed photograph The Soiling of Old Glory, which was taken by photojournalist Stanley Forman and won the 1977 Pulitzer Prize for Spot News Photography. On Landsmark's way to a meeting in Boston City Hall, he was met by young demonstrators against the Boston Desegregation Busing Crisis. It depicts a young white teenager, Joseph Rakes, assaulting Landsmark with a flagpole holding the American flag.

In the 1970s, Landsmark worked as a civil rights attorney and advocate in Boston. Initially, he worked primarily to assist minority contractors in gaining opportunities in the construction industry. It was not until his assault that he began to focus his efforts on the city's busing crisis.

Following the incident, Landsmark received widespread attention from locals and the media. He parlayed the attention to increase awareness of the racial unrest in Boston. Mayor Raymond Flynn later hired him to improve youth and workforce development in the city.

== Personal life ==
Landsmark had polio as a child.

== Awards ==
- 2005 - Boston Society of Architects Award of Honor
- 2006 - American Institute of Architects Whitney M. Young Jr. Award

== See also ==
- List of polio survivors
