= Mariënhof =

Coordinates: 52°9′12.02″N 5°23′25.58″E

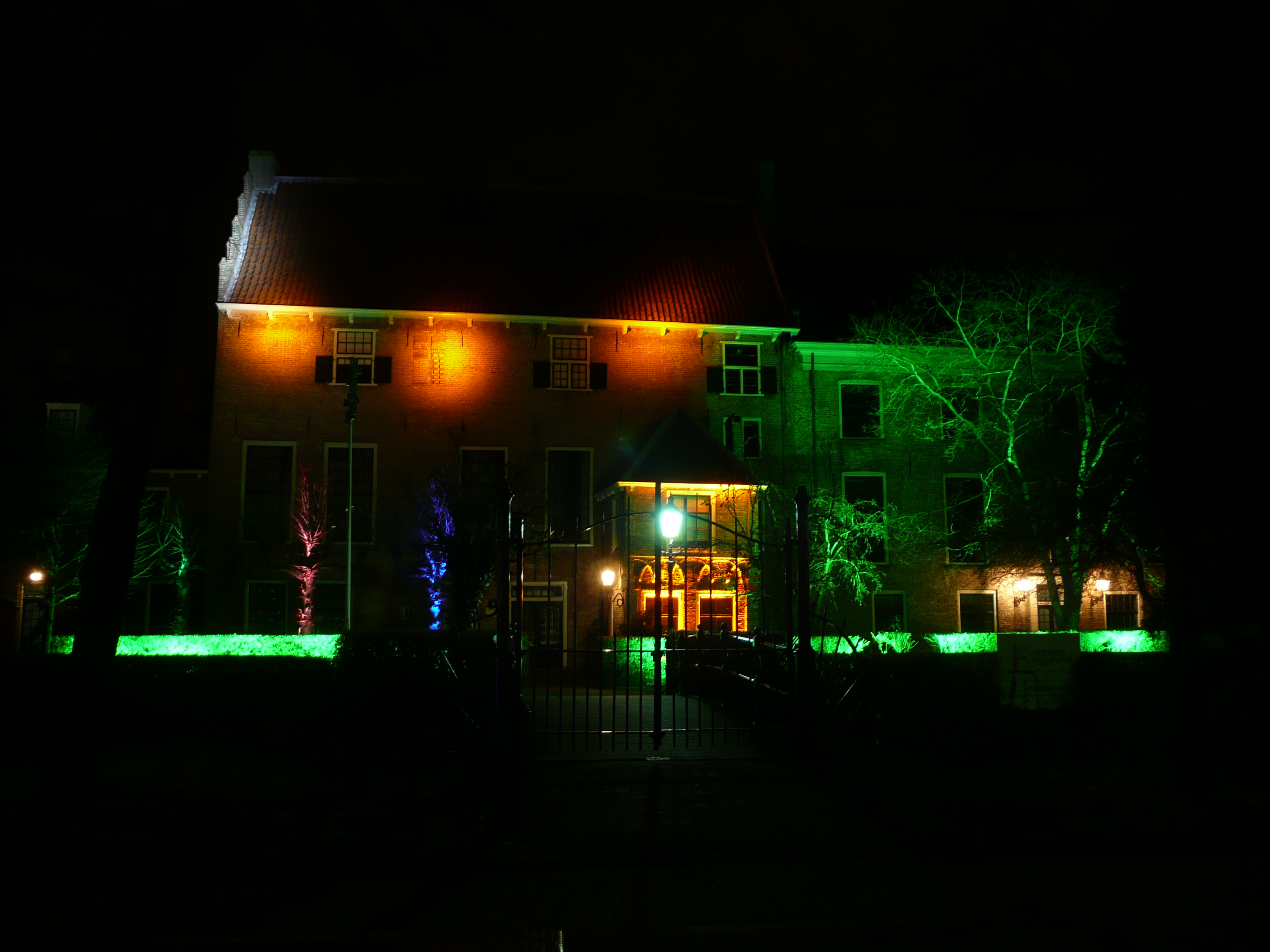
- Interactive map of Mariënhof

Restaurant information
- Established: 1993
- Closed: 2001
- Head chef: Jon Sistermans
- Food type: French
- Rating: Michelin Guide
- Location: Kleine Haag 2, Amersfoort, 3811 HE, Netherlands

Mariënhof is a defunct restaurant in Amersfoort, in the Netherlands. It was a fine dining restaurant that was awarded one Michelin star in 1996 and retained that rating until 2001.

Head chef of Mariënhof was Jon Sistermans.

The restaurant ended due to the transfer of ownership of the former monastery from insurance company "Amersfoortse Verzekeringen" to the "Van den Tweel Horeca Groep". The new owners changed course and wanted the restaurant to leave the fine dining and move into a lower class. After Sistermans left, the restaurant was closed.

Restaurant Mariënhof and its chef Jon Sistermans were at the centre of a big row around the restaurant review magazine Lekker in the year 2000. He accused Lekker of deliberately damaging restaurants and staff without reason. Sistermans started the campaign "Lekker Beest 2001" and an advertiser boycott, to let the magazine change course. The magazine gave in and appointed a new chief editor with a culinary background and softened its language.

Head chef Sistermans was also culinary responsible for the Michelin starred De Rôtisserie in the same complex, although Mandy de Jong was the head chef in charge. Shortly after being burned down by “Lekker”, De Rôtisserie was awarded its own Michelin star.

== See also ==
- List of Michelin starred restaurants in the Netherlands
