= Stanley Forman =

American photojournalist (born 1945)

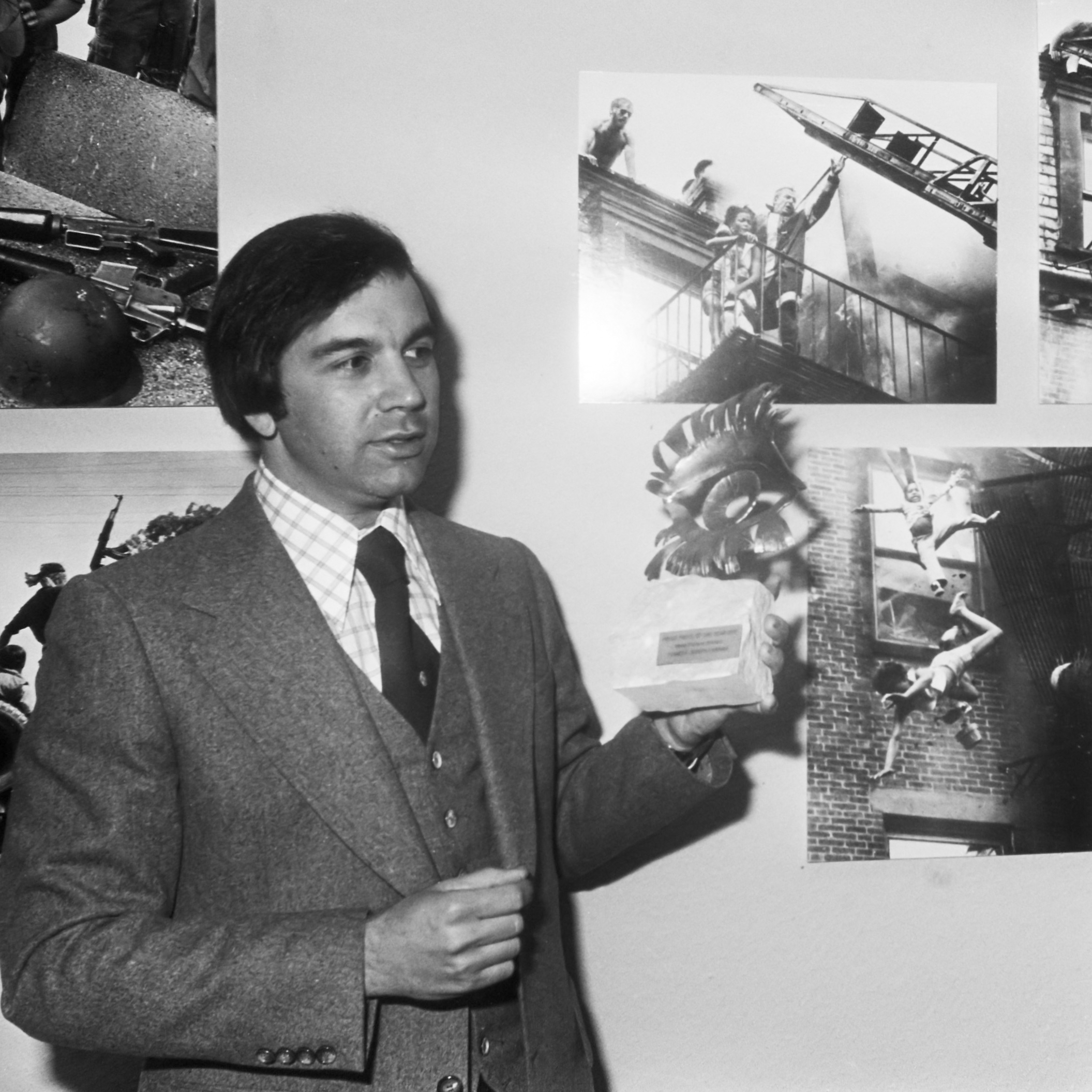
- Forman in 1976
- Born: Stanley Joseph Forman; July 10, 1945 (age 81); Winthrop, Massachusetts, U.S.
- Education: Benjamin Franklin Institute of Technology
- Notable work: Fire Escape Collapse; The Soiling of Old Glory
- Awards: Sigma Delta Chi Award; 1975 World Press Photo of the Year; 1975 Pulitzer Prize for Spot News Photography; 1976 and 1977
- Website: stanleyformanphotos.com

Stanley Joseph Forman (born July 10, 1945) is an American photojournalist who won the Pulitzer Prize for Spot News Photography two years in a row while working at the Boston Herald.

== Biography ==
A native of Winthrop, Massachusetts, Forman graduated from Revere High School and studied photography at the Benjamin Franklin Institute of Technology from 1965 to 1966. After graduating, Forman became a cameraman for political campaigns before joining the Boston Herald American as a photo lab technician. Forman was later promoted to staff photographer.

== Career ==
By the 1970s Forman became the recipient of citations from the United Press International and the Boston Press Photographers. In 1973 he was chosen as Regional Photographer of the year.

In 1975, Forman was awarded the World Press Photo of the Year by World Press Photo for the Fire Escape Collapse, a photograph depicting a young woman, Diana Bryant, and her goddaughter, Tiare Jones, falling from a collapsed fire escape during a fire. As he found out later, the child survived because she was cushioned by the body of her godmother. In 1976 the photo received the Pulitzer Prize for Feature Photography.

Forman is the first photographer to win the Pulitzer Prize for Spot News Photography two years in a row (1976 and 1977). In 1976, he won for the Fire Escape Collapse, and the next year, he became co-winner for the same award for The Soiling of Old Glory, a photograph depicting a black attorney, Ted Landsmark, being assaulted by a white male teenager, Joseph Rakes, wielding a flagpole holding the American flag as a weapon during the height of the Boston Desegregation Busing Crisis.

In 1979, Forman's photography staff at the Boston Herald American won a Pulitzer Prize for Feature Photography for coverage of the Blizzard of 1978 in Boston. However, Forman did not take any photographs that led to the award because he was recovering from an Achilles tendon injury. The following year, he was named a Nieman Fellow and was honored with the Joseph A. Sprague Memorial Award from the National Press Photographers Association.

Forman has worked as a cameraman for Boston's WCVB-TV since 1983. In 2013 he published a book, Before Yellow Tape.

== Honors ==
- 1975 – Winner, Sigma Delta Chi Award
- 1975 – Winner, World Press Photo of the Year for Fire Escape Collapse
- 1976 – Winner, Pulitzer Prize for Spot News Photography for Fire Escape Collapse
- 1977 – Co-winner, Pulitzer Prize for Spot News Photography for The Soiling of Old Glory
- 1980 – Nieman Fellow
- 1980 – National Press Photographers Association Joseph A. Sprague Memorial Award
- 2017 – National Academy of Television Arts and Sciences Silver Circle Award

== Sources ==
- Fischer, Heinz-Dietrich (2015). Key Images of American Life: Pulitzer Prize Winning Pictures. Zurich: LIT. p. 64. ISBN 978-3-643-90518-5.
- Fischer, Heinz Dietrich; Fischer, Erika J. (2002). Complete Biographical Encyclopedia of Pulitzer Prize Winners, 1917-2000. Munich: Walter de Gruyter. p. 74. ISBN 3-598-30186-3.
