= Robert McFadden =

Robert McFadden may refer to:

- Robert D. McFadden (born 1937), American journalist
- Bob McFadden (1923–2000), American voice actor
- Robert L. McFadden (1929–2010), South Carolina politician
