= 1972 Pulitzer Prize =

Awards for journalism and related fields

The Pulitzer Prizes for 1972 are:

== Journalism awards ==
- Public Service:
  - The New York Times, for the publication of the Pentagon Papers.
- Local General or Spot News Reporting:
  - Richard Cooper and John Machacek of the Rochester Times-Union, for their coverage of the Attica Prison riots.
- Local Investigative Specialized Reporting:
  - Timothy Leland, Gerard M. O'Neill, Stephen A. Kurkjian and Ann Desantis of The Boston Globe, for their exposure of widespread corruption in Somerville, Massachusetts.
- National Reporting:
  - Jack Anderson, syndicated columnist, for his reporting of American policy decision-making during the Indo-Pakistan War of 1971.
- International reporting:
  - Peter R. Kann of The Wall Street Journal, for his coverage of the Indo Pakistan War of 1971.
- Commentary:
  - Mike Royko of the Chicago Daily News, for his columns during 1971.
- Criticism:
  - Frank Peters Jr. of the St. Louis Post-Dispatch, for his music criticism during 1971.
- Editorial Writing:
  - John Strohmeyer of the Bethlehem Globe-Times, for his editorial campaign to reduce racial tensions in Bethlehem, Pennsylvania.
- Editorial Cartooning:
  - Jeffrey K. MacNelly of the Richmond News-Leader, for his editorial cartooning during 1971.
- Spot News Photography:
  - Horst Faas and Michel Laurent of Associated Press, for their picture series, Death in Dacca.
- Feature Photography:
  - David Hume Kennerly of United Press International, for his dramatic photographs of the Vietnam War in 1971.

== Letters, Drama and Music awards ==
- Fiction:
  - Angle of Repose by Wallace Stegner (Random)
- Drama:
  - No award given.
- History:
  - Neither Black Nor White by Carl N. Degler (Macmillan)
- Biography or Autobiography:
  - Eleanor and Franklin by Joseph P. Lash (Norton)
- Poetry:
  - Collected Poems by James Wright (Wesleyan Univ. Press)
- Nonfiction:
  - Stilwell and the American Experience in China, 1911-1945 by Barbara W. Tuchman (Macmillan)
- Music:
  - Windows by Jacob Druckman (MCA Music)
    Premiered by the Chicago Symphony Orchestra on March 16, 1972, at Orchestra Hall, Chicago.
