= Pulitzer Prize for Breaking News Reporting =

American journalism award

The Pulitzer Prize for Breaking News Reporting is a Pulitzer Prize awarded for a distinguished example of breaking news, local reporting on news of the moment. It has been awarded since 1953 under several names:

- From 1953 to 1963: Pulitzer Prize for Local Reporting, Edition Time
- From 1964 to 1984: Pulitzer Prize for Local General or Spot News Reporting
- From 1985 to 1990: Pulitzer Prize for General News Reporting
- From 1991 to 1997: Pulitzer Prize for Spot News Reporting
- From 1998 to present: Pulitzer Prize for Breaking News Reporting

Prior to 1953, a Pulitzer Prize for Local Reporting combined both breaking and investigative reporting under one category. The Pulitzer Committee issues an official citation explaining the reasons for the award.

Hitherto confined to local coverage, the Breaking News Reporting category was expanded to encompass state and national reporting in 2017.

== List of winners for Pulitzer Prize for Local Reporting, Edition Time ==
Year	Name(s)	Publication	Rationale
1953	Staff	The Providence Journal	"for their spontaneous and cooperative coverage of a bank robbery and police chase leading to the capture of the bandit."
1954	Staff	Vicksburg Post-Herald	"for its outstanding coverage of the tornado of December 5, 1953, under extraordinary difficulties."
1955	Caro Brown	Alice Daily Echo	"for a series of news stories dealing with the successful attack on one-man political rule in neighboring Duval County, written under unusual pressure both of edition time and difficult, even dangerous, circumstances. Mrs. Brown dug into the facts behind the dramatic daily events, as well, and obtained her stories in spite of the bitterest political opposition, showing professional skill and courage."
1956	Lee Hills	Detroit Free Press	"for his aggressive, resourceful and comprehensive front page reporting of the United Automobile Workers' negotiations with Ford and General Motors for a guaranteed annual wage."
1957	Staff	The Salt Lake Tribune	"for its prompt and efficient coverage of the crash of two air liners over the Grand Canyon, in which 128 persons were killed."
1958	Staff	Fargo Forum	"for its swift, vivid and detailed news and picture coverage of a tornado which struck Fargo on June 20."
1959	Mary Lou Forbes	The Washington Star	"for her comprehensive year-long coverage of the integration crisis in Virginia which demonstrated admirable qualities of accuracy, speed and the ability to interpret the news under deadline pressure in the course of a difficult and taxing assignment." (Note: Forbes was recognized under her birth name, Mary Lou Werner.)
1960	Jack Nelson	The Atlanta Constitution	"for his reporting of abuses at the Milledgeville Central State Mental Hospital."
1961	Ted Morgan	New York Herald Tribune	"for his moving account of the death of Leonard Warren on the Metropolitan Opera stage." (Note: Morgan was recognized under his pseudonym, Sanche de Gramont.)
1962	Robert D. Mullins	Deseret News	"for his resourceful coverage of a murder and kidnapping at Dead Horse Point, Utah."
1963	Sylvan Fox	New York World-Telegram	"for their reporting of an air crash in Jamaica Bay, killing 95 persons on March 1, 1962."
1963	William Longgood	New York World-Telegram	"for their reporting of an air crash in Jamaica Bay, killing 95 persons on March 1, 1962."
1963	Anthony Shannon	New York World-Telegram	"for their reporting of an air crash in Jamaica Bay, killing 95 persons on March 1, 1962."

== List of winners for Pulitzer Prize for Local General or Spot News Reporting ==
Year	Name(s)	Publication	Rationale
1964	Norman C. Miller	The Wall Street Journal	"for his comprehensive account of a multi-million dollar vegetable oil swindle in New Jersey."
1965	Mel Ruder	Hungry Horse News	"for his daring and resourceful coverage of a disastrous flood that threatened his community, an individual effort in the finest tradition of spot news reporting."
1966	Staff	Los Angeles Times	"for its coverage of the Watts riots."
1967	Robert Cox	Public Opinion	"for his vivid deadline reporting of a mountain manhunt that ended with the killing of a deranged sniper who had terrorized the community."
1968	Staff	Detroit Free Press	"for its coverage of the Detroit riots of 1967, recognizing both the brilliance of its detailed spot news staff work and its swift and accurate investigation into the underlying causes of the tragedy."
1969	John Fetterman	The Louisville Times	"for his article, 'Pfc. Gibson Comes Home,' the story of an American soldier whose body was returned to his native town from Vietnam for burial."
1969	John Fetterman	Courier Journal	"for his article, 'Pfc. Gibson Comes Home,' the story of an American soldier whose body was returned to his native town from Vietnam for burial."
1970	Thomas Fitzpatrick	Chicago Sun-Times	"for his article about the violence of youthful radicals in Chicago, 'A Wild Night's Ride with SDS.'"
1971	Staff	Akron Beacon Journal	"for its coverage of the Kent State University tragedy on May 4, 1970."
1972	Richard Cooper	Rochester Times-Union	"for their coverage of the Attica, New York prison riot."
1972	John Machacek	Rochester Times-Union	"for their coverage of the Attica, New York prison riot."
1973	Staff	Chicago Tribune	"for uncovering flagrant violations of voting procedures in the primary election of March 21, 1972."
1974	Hugh Hough	Chicago Sun-Times	"for uncovering new evidence that led to the reopening of efforts to solve the 1966 murder of Valerie Percy."
1974	Art Petacque	Chicago Sun-Times	"for uncovering new evidence that led to the reopening of efforts to solve the 1966 murder of Valerie Percy."
1975	Staff	Xenia Daily Gazette	"for its coverage, under enormous difficulties, of the tornado that wrecked the city on April 3, 1974."
1976	Gene Miller	Miami Herald	"for his persistent and courageous reporting over eight and one-half years that led to the exoneration and release of two men who had twice been tried for murder and wrongfully convicted and sentenced to death in Florida."
1977	Margo Huston	Milwaukee Journal Sentinel	"for her reports on the elderly and the process of aging."
1978	Richard Whitt	Courier Journal	"for his coverage of a fire that took 164 lives at the Beverly Hills Supper Club at Southgate, Ky., and subsequent investigation of the lack of enforcement of state fire codes."
1979	Staff	San Diego Evening Tribune	"for its coverage of the collision of a Pacific Southwest air liner with a small plane over its city."
1980	Staff	The Philadelphia Inquirer	"for coverage of the nuclear accident at Three Mile Island."
1980	Staff	Chicago Tribune	"for coverage of the worst air crash in history and the blizzard of 1979."
1980	Staff	Greensboro Daily News	"for coverage of a shootout of the Ku Klux Klan."
1981	Staff	The Daily News	"for its coverage of the Mt. St. Helens story, including the photographs by Roger A. Werth."
1981	Staff	Baltimore News-American	"for 'The Snowball Tragedy,' a story of the gap between the young and the elderly."
1981	Staff	Miami Herald	"for 'Three Days of Rage: The Miami Riots.'"
1982	Staff	The Kansas City Star	"for coverage of the Hyatt Regency Hotel disaster and identification of its causes."
1982	Staff	Kansas City Times	"for coverage of the Hyatt Regency Hotel disaster and identification of its causes."
1982	Lucy Morgan	St. Petersburg Times	"for her series on drug smuggling in Dixie County, Florida."
1982	Ken Wells	Miami Herald	"for his series on Florida's water problems."
1982	Staff	Courier Journal	"for its coverage of an explosion in the Louisville sewer system."
1983	Staff	The News-Sentinel	"for its courageous and resourceful coverage of a devastating flood in March 1982."
1983	Staff	The Dallas Morning News	"for its coverage and analysis of the financial collapse of Braniff International Airlines."
1983	Staff	Democrat and Chronicle	"for its coverage of an accident at Ginna nuclear power plant that helped to avert public panic."
1984	Staff	Newsday	"for their enterprising and comprehensive coverage of the Baby Jane Doe case and its far-reaching social and political implications."
1984	Leslie Scism	Bucks County Courier Times	"for her investigation of Anna Catherina Emmerick Academy, which linked the religious school's activities to right-wing extremist groups and revealed that it housed weaponry and explosives."
1984	Staff	The Fresno Bee	"for its coverage, under extreme deadline pressure, of the Coalinga earthquake of May 2, 1983."

== List of winners for Pulitzer Prize for General News Reporting ==
Year	Name(s)	Publication	Rationale
1985	Thomas Turcol	The Virginian-Pilot	"for City Hall coverage which exposed the corruption of a local economic development official."
1985	Jonathan Kaufman	The Boston Globe	"for his series on neighborhood activism in Boston."
1985	Staff	Independent Record	"for its coverage, under deadline pressure, of the worst forest fire in Helena's history."
1986	Edna Buchanan	Miami Herald	"for her versatile and consistently excellent police beat reporting."
1986	Staff	The Dallas Morning News	"for its comprehensive and compelling coverage, under deadline pressure, of the crash of Delta Flight 191 on August 2, 1985."
1986	Staff	The Philadelphia Inquirer	"for its coverage, under deadline pressure, of the MOVE siege and its tragic aftermath."
1987	Staff	Akron Beacon Journal	"for its coverage, under deadline pressure, of the attempted takeover of Goodyear Tire and Rubber Co. by a European financier."
1987	John Woestendiek	The Philadelphia Inquirer	"for outstanding prison beat reporting, which included proving the innocence of a man convicted of murder."
1987	Staff	The Orange County Register	"for its comprehensive coverage of the Cerritos air disaster, a midair collision of a jetliner and a private plane on August 31, 1986."
1988	Staff	Alabama Journal	"for its compelling investigation of the state's unusually high infant mortality rate, which prompted legislation to combat the problem."
1988	Staff	The Eagle-Tribune	"for an investigation that revealed serious flaws in the Massachusetts prison furlough system and led to significant statewide reforms."
1988	Sam Stanton	The Arizona Republic	"for his reporting on Governor Evan Mecham's turbulent first year in office."
1988	Staff	The Atlanta Journal-Constitution	"for sustained coverage of an 11-day riot by Cuban inmates at the Atlanta Federal Penitentiary."
1988	Staff	The Charlotte Observer	"for revealing misuse of funds by the PTL television ministry through persistent coverage conducted in the face of a massive campaign by PTL to discredit the newspaper."
1989	Staff	Courier Journal	"for its exemplary initial coverage of a bus crash that claimed 27 lives and its subsequent thorough and effective examination of the causes and implications of the tragedy."
1989	Nancy Badertscher	Gwinnett Daily News	"for persistent reporting that revealed expense account abuses by members of the local County Board of Commissioners."
1989	Lisa Getter	Miami Herald	"for their investigation of financial wrongdoing by a popular county manager, reporting which was conducted in the face of strong local opposition and which ultimately led to the official's resignation."
1989	Justin Gillis	Miami Herald	"for their investigation of financial wrongdoing by a popular county manager, reporting which was conducted in the face of strong local opposition and which ultimately led to the official's resignation."
1989	Staff	Billings Gazette	"for coverage of the fires in Yellowstone National Park."
1990	Staff	The Mercury News	"for its detailed coverage of the October 17, 1989, Bay Area earthquake and its aftermath."
1990	Staff	The Roanoke Times	"for its thorough and balanced coverage of a statewide strike by the United Mine Workers against the Pittston Coal Group."
1990	Staff	The State	"for its extensive and compelling coverage of the devastation caused by Hurricane Hugo."

== List of winners for Pulitzer Prize for Spot News Reporting ==
Year	Name(s)	Publication	Rationale
1991	Staff	Miami Herald	"for stories profiling a local cult leader, his followers, and their links to several area murders."
1991	Staff	Newsday	"for detailed coverage of a Bronx social club fire that was caused by arson and claimed 87 lives."
1991	Staff	The Detroit News	"for his series on neighborhood activism in Boston."
1992	Staff	Newsday	"for coverage of a midnight subway derailment in Manhattan that left five passengers dead and more than 200 injured."
1992	Staff	The Philadelphia Inquirer	"for its coverage of a helicopter crash in a local schoolyard that killed U.S. Senator John Heinz and six others."
1992	Staff	Vineyard Gazette	"for its coverage of the destruction to the island community of Martha's Vineyard by Hurricane Bob."
1993	Staff	Los Angeles Times	"for comprehensive, penetrating coverage under deadline pressure of the second, most destructive day of the Los Angeles riots."
1993	Staff	Miami Herald	"for its sensitive reporting of the failed legal battle fought by parents of a child born without a brain to donate the child's organs before her death."
1993	Staff	The Spokesman-Review	"for detailed, often exclusive reporting of an 11-day clash in Northern Idaho between an armed white separatist and 300 law enforcement officers."
1994	Staff	The New York Times	"for its comprehensive coverage of the 1993 World Trade Center bombing."
1994	Robert D. McFadden	The New York Times	"for his consistently impressive work during the year, much of it on deadline."
1994	Staff	Los Angeles Times	"for its richly detailed coverage of the first day of fires that ravaged Southern California."
1995	Staff	Los Angeles Times	"for its reporting on January 17, 1994, of the chaos and devastation in the aftermath of the 1994 Northridge earthquake."
1995	Staff	Rocky Mountain News	"for its coverage of a deadly wildfire that killed 14 firefighters, the worst disaster of its kind in Colorado's history."
1995	Staff	The New York Times	"for its coverage of the city's police department as it was rocked by charges of corruption in a Harlem precinct."
1996	Robert D. McFadden	The New York Times	"for his highly skilled writing and reporting on deadline during the year."
1996	Staff	Los Angeles Times	"for its coverage of the local and global impact of the purchase of Capital Cities/ABC Inc. by the Walt Disney Company."
1996	Staff	The Eagle-Tribune	"for its coverage of a fire that leveled a local textile factory, the city's largest employer, and its devastating effects on the community."
1997	Staff	Newsday	"for its enterprising coverage of the crash of TWA Flight 800 and its aftermath."
1997	Staff	The Philadelphia Inquirer	"for its powerful narrative coverage of the armed confrontation between police and philanthropist John du Pont following a murder at his estate."
1997	Staff	St. Petersburg Times	"for its thorough and balanced reporting of the circumstances surrounding the shooting of a young black man by a white police officer and the rioting that followed."

== List of winners for Pulitzer Prize for Breaking News Reporting ==
Year	Name(s)	Publication	Rationale
1998	Staff	Los Angeles Times	"for its coverage of a botched bank robbery and subsequent police shootout in North Hollywood."
1998	John Dennis Harrigan	The News and Sentinel	"for his coverage of a shooting spree that left five dead, including his newspaper's managing editor."
1998	Mike McAlary	New York Daily News	"for reporting on the brutalization of a Haitian immigrant by police officers at a Brooklyn stationhouse." (Note: Moved by the Pulitzer board from the Commentary category.)
1999	Staff	Hartford Courant	"for its clear and detailed coverage of a shooting rampage in which a state lottery worker killed four supervisors then himself."
1999	Staff	Jonesboro Sun	"for its aggressive yet responsible coverage of a shooting at a local middle school in which two boys killed a teacher and four classmates and wounded 10 others."
1999	Staff	Miami Herald	"for its coverage of a 12-year-old boy's electrocution at a county bus shelter and the breaking news developments in the subsequent investigation of the shelter's faulty wiring, which likely caused the boy's death."
2000	Staff	The Denver Post	"for its clear and balanced coverage of the student massacre at Columbine High School."
2000	Staff	The News and Observer	"for its comprehensive coverage of the destruction in the state caused by Hurricane Floyd."
2000	Staff	The Oregonian	"for its comprehensive coverage of an environmental disaster created when a cargo ship carrying heavy fuels ran aground and broke apart, and how fumbling efforts of official agencies failed to contain the far-reaching damage."
2001	Staff	Miami Herald	"for its balanced and gripping on-the-scene coverage of the pre-dawn raid by federal agents that took the Cuban boy Elián González from his Miami relatives and reunited him with his Cuban father."
2001	Staff	Los Angeles Times	"for its compelling and resourceful coverage of every aspect of the crash of Alaska Airlines Flight 261 off the California coast, which killed 88 passengers."
2001	Staff	The Star-Ledger	"for its graphic and highly detailed coverage, despite restricted access, of the dormitory fire at Seton Hall University that killed three students and injured 58 others."
2002	Staff	The Wall Street Journal	"for its comprehensive and insightful coverage, executed under the most difficult circumstances, of the terrorist attack on New York City, which recounted the day's events and their implications for the future."
2002	Staff	New York Daily News	"for its vivid and detailed on-scene coverage of the September 11th terrorist attacks on New York City."
2002	Staff	The New York Times	"for its eloquent and precise coverage of the September 11th terrorist attacks that captured the gravity, drama and historic dimension of the day's events."
2003	Staff	The Eagle-Tribune	"for its detailed, well-crafted stories on the accidental drowning of four boys in the Merrimack River."
2003	Staff	The Baltimore Sun	"for its compelling and comprehensive coverage of the sniper killings that terrorized the Washington-Baltimore region."
2003	Staff	The Seattle Times	"for its enterprising coverage of the many local connections to the ex-soldier and his teenage companion arrested in the sniper attacks in the Washington, D.C. region."
2004	Staff	Los Angeles Times	"for its compelling and comprehensive coverage of the massive wildfires that imperiled a populated region of Southern California."
2004	Staff	Miami Herald	"for its immediate and distinctive search for the cause of the Columbia space shuttle disaster."
2004	Staff	Newsday	"for its enterprising coverage of the summertime blackout that stretched over a vast area of the United States and cut the paper's own power supply as deadlines loomed."
2005	Staff	The Star-Ledger	"for its comprehensive, clear-headed coverage of the resignation of New Jersey's governor after he announced he was gay and confessed to adultery with a male lover."
2005	Staff	Charlotte Sun	"for its heroic coverage of Hurricane Charley after it destroyed the homes of employees and cut the paper's power supply and phone service."
2005	Staff	Sun Sentinel	"for its enterprising and wide-ranging coverage, under difficult conditions, of four hurricanes that battered Florida over a six-week span."
2006	Staff	The Times-Picayune	"for its courageous and aggressive coverage of Hurricane Katrina, overcoming desperate conditions facing the city and the newspaper."
2006	Staff	The Atlanta Journal-Constitution	"for its swift and rigorous accounts of a shooting rampage by a prisoner who seized a deputy sheriff's gun and killed a judge and three others."
2006	Staff	Sun Sentinel	"for its clear, cohesive and enterprising coverage of Hurricane Wilma after it battered a region still recovering from major storms the previous year."
2007	Staff	The Oregonian	"for its skillful and tenacious coverage of a family missing in the Oregon mountains, telling the tragic story both in print and online."
2007	Staff	Courier Journal	"for its clear and authoritative reporting on the crash of a Comair commuter jet that killed 49 people."
2007	Staff	The Denver Post	"for its compelling and notably human coverage of back-to-back blizzards that trapped travelers and paralyzed the region."
2008	Staff	The Washington Post	"for its exceptional, multi-faceted coverage of the deadly shooting rampage at Virginia Tech, telling the developing story in print and online."
2008	Staff	Idaho Statesman	"for its tenacious coverage of the twists and turns in the scandal involving the state's senator, Larry Craig."
2008	Staff	The New York Times	"for its swift, penetrating coverage of a fire in the Bronx that killed nine persons, eight of them children."
2009	Staff	The New York Times	"for its swift and sweeping coverage of a prostitution scandal that resulted in the resignation of Gov. Eliot Spitzer, breaking the story on its website and then developing it with authoritative, rapid-fire reports."
2009	Staff	Houston Chronicle	"for taking full advantage of online technology and its newsroom expertise to become a lifeline to the city when Hurricane Ike struck, providing vital minute-by-minute updates on the storm, its flood surge and its aftermath."
2009	Staff	St. Louis Post-Dispatch	"for its creative and aggressive coverage, both online and in print, of a city hall shooting that left six people dead, displaying an exemplary blend of speed and rigor in its reporting."
2010	Staff	The Seattle Times	"for its comprehensive coverage, in print and online, of the shooting deaths of four police officers in a coffee house and the 40-hour manhunt for the suspect."
2010	Staff	The Star-Ledger	"for its sweeping coverage of 44 arrests in a widespread corruption scandal that snared local officials, several religious leaders and others."
2010	Staff	The Washington Post	"for its compelling coverage of an Army psychiatrist, with long ties to Washington, who killed 13 people in a shooting rampage at Fort Hood, a Texas military base."
2011	No award.		
2011	Staff	Chicago Tribune	"for its coverage of the deaths of two Chicago firefighters who were killed while searching for squatters in an abandoned burning building."
2011	Staff	El Nuevo Herald	"for their coverage of a devastating earthquake in Haiti, often working under extreme conditions."
2011	Staff	Miami Herald	"for their coverage of a devastating earthquake in Haiti, often working under extreme conditions."
2011	Staff	The Tennessean	"for its coverage of the most devastating flood in Middle Tennessee history."
2012	Staff	The Tuscaloosa News	"for its enterprising coverage of a deadly tornado, using social media as well as traditional reporting to provide real-time updates, help locate missing people and produce in-depth print accounts even after power disruption forced the paper to publish at another plant 50 miles away."
2012	Staff	The Arizona Republic	"for its comprehensive coverage of the mass shooting that killed six and wounded 13, including Congresswoman Gabrielle Giffords, an exemplary use of journalistic tools, from Twitter to video to written reports and features, to tell an unfolding story."
2012	Staff	Wisconsin State Journal	"for its energetic coverage of 27 days of around-the-clock protests in the State Capitol over collective bargaining rights, using an array of journalistic tools to capture one breaking development after another."
2013	Staff	The Denver Post	"for its comprehensive coverage of the mass shooting at a movie theater in Aurora, Colorado, that killed 12 and injured 58, using journalistic tools, from Twitter and Facebook to video and written reports, both to capture a breaking story and provide context."
2013	Staff	The Denver Post	"for its vivid coverage of a wildfire that destroyed more than 300 homes, combining on-the-ground reporting with imaginative use of digital tools, including a before-and-after interactive feature that helped displaced fire victims determine the fate of their homes before there was official notification."
2013	Staff	Hartford Courant	"for its complete and sensitive coverage of the shooting massacre at an elementary school in Newtown, Connecticut, that killed 20 children and 6 adults, using digital tools as well as traditional reporting to tell the story quickly while portraying the stunned community's grief."
2014	Staff	The Boston Globe	"for exhaustive and empathetic coverage of the Boston Marathon bombing and the ensuing manhunt that enveloped the city, using photography and a range of digital tools to capture the full impact of the tragedy."
2014	Staff	The Arizona Republic	"for its compelling coverage of a fast-moving wildfire that claimed the lives of 19 firefighters and destroyed more than a hundred homes, using an array of journalistic tools to tell the story."
2014	Staff	The Washington Post	"for its alert, in-depth coverage of the mass shooting at the Washington Navy Yard, employing a mix of platforms to tell a developing story with accuracy and sensitivity."
2015	Staff	The Seattle Times	"for its digital account of a landslide that killed 43 people and the impressive follow-up reporting that explored whether the calamity could have been avoided."
2015	Staff	The Buffalo News	"for a superbly reported and written account of a lake-effect snowstorm, using human detail to illuminate the story and multimedia elements to help readers through the storm."
2015	Staff	Los Angeles Times	"for a quick but thoughtful response to a shooting spree, beginning with minute-by-minute digital storytelling and evolving into print coverage that delved into the impact of the tragedy."
2016	Staff	Los Angeles Times	"for exceptional reporting, including both local and global perspectives, on the shooting in San Bernardino and the terror investigation that followed."
2016	Staff	The Baltimore Sun	"for fast-moving coverage of the rioting that followed the death of Freddie Gray, reflecting the newsroom's knowledge of the community and advancing the conversation about police violence."
2016	Staff	The Post and Courier	"for its tenacious effort in obtaining video of a police officer shooting an unarmed Walter Scott and superb reporting that put the recorded shooting in context."
2017	Staff	East Bay Times	"for relentless coverage of the 'Ghost Ship' fire, which killed 36 people at a warehouse party, and for reporting after the tragedy that exposed the city's failure to take actions that might have prevented it."
2017	Staff	The Dallas Morning News	"for keeping readers informed during a chaotic shooting spree that killed five police officers and injured nine others and delivering timely, vivid and heartbreaking accounts of the horrific night."
2017	Staff	Orlando Sentinel	"for coverage of the mass shooting at the Pulse nightclub, including middle-of-the-night reports as party-goers hid and police prepared to storm the building and subsequent work that took readers inside the club and humanized the victims."
2018	Staff	The Press Democrat	"for lucid and tenacious coverage of historic wildfires that ravaged the city of Santa Rosa and Sonoma County, expertly utilizing an array of tools, including photography, video and social media platforms, to bring clarity to its readers—in real time and in subsequent in-depth reporting."
2018	Staff	Houston Chronicle	"for comprehensive and dynamic coverage of Hurricane Harvey that captured real-time developments of the unprecedented scale of the disaster and provided crucial information to its community during the storm and its aftermath."
2018	Staff	The New York Times	"for authoritative and innovative coverage of the deadliest mass shooting in modern American history at a concert in Las Vegas, using poignant storytelling as well as groundbreaking video analysis and motion graphics to illustrate how the attack unfolded."
2019	Staff	Pittsburgh Post-Gazette	"for immersive, compassionate coverage of the massacre at Pittsburgh's Tree of Life synagogue that captured the anguish and resilience of a community thrust into grief."
2019	Staff	Bay Area News Group	"for committed coverage of an epic California wildfire that consumed more than 18,000 buildings in 150,000 acres, and took 86 lives." (Note: Moved by the Pulitzer board from the Local Reporting category.)
2019	Staff	Chico Enterprise-Record	"for committed coverage of an epic California wildfire that consumed more than 18,000 buildings in 150,000 acres, and took 86 lives."
2019	Staff	Sun Sentinel	"for exhaustive and lucid multi-platform coverage of the Marjory Stoneman Douglas High School rampage that brought compassion and clarity to a horrific tragedy."
2020	Staff	Courier Journal	"for its rapid coverage of hundreds of last-minute pardons by Kentucky's governor, showing how the process was marked by opacity, racial disparities and violations of legal norms."
2020	Staff	Los Angeles Times	"for dynamic coverage that expertly blended multimedia components, frequent updates and rich narrative to report on a devastating California boat fire that killed 34 people."
2020	Staff	The Washington Post	"for incisive coverage of back-to-back mass shootings in El Paso, Texas and Dayton, Ohio that contextualized these events for a national audience."
2021	Staff	The Minnesota Star Tribune	"for its urgent, authoritative and nuanced coverage of the death of George Floyd at the hands of police in Minneapolis and of the reverberations that followed."
2021	Sharon Begley (Note: Posthumously.)	Stat News	"for their prescient, expert and accessible coverage of the emergence of COVID-19, sounding the alarm on the potential spread and potency of the virus."
2021	Helen Branswell	Stat News	"for their prescient, expert and accessible coverage of the emergence of COVID-19, sounding the alarm on the potential spread and potency of the virus."
2021	Andrew Joseph	Stat News	"for their prescient, expert and accessible coverage of the emergence of COVID-19, sounding the alarm on the potential spread and potency of the virus."
2021	Staff	Courier Journal	"for exclusive coverage that contradicted police narratives in the killing of Breonna Taylor, and for its sensitive and innovative coverage of the aftermath."
2022	Staff	Miami Herald	"for its urgent yet sweeping coverage of the collapse of the Champlain Towers South condominium complex, merging clear and compassionate writing with comprehensive news and accountability reporting."
2022	Staff	Los Angeles Times	"for deeply sourced and detailed reporting about a fatal shooting on the set of the film Rust that moved beyond the day's events to a larger consideration of labor and safety concerns in the film industry."
2022	Staff	The New York Times	"for its aggressive and revelatory reporting about the attack on Washington on January 6, 2021, delivered as the events were unfolding and afterwards."
2023	Staff	Los Angeles Times	"for revealing a secretly recorded conversation among city officials that included racist comments, followed by coverage of the rapidly resulting turmoil and deeply reported pieces that delved further into the racial issues affecting local politics."
2023	Peter S. Canellos	Politico	"for exclusive coverage of the unprecedented leak of a draft Supreme Court opinion overturning Roe v. Wade and giving states the power to regulate abortion." (Note: Moved by the Pulitzer board from the National Reporting category.)
2023	Hailey Fuchs	Politico	"for exclusive coverage of the unprecedented leak of a draft Supreme Court opinion overturning Roe v. Wade and giving states the power to regulate abortion."
2023	Josh Gerstein	Politico	"for exclusive coverage of the unprecedented leak of a draft Supreme Court opinion overturning Roe v. Wade and giving states the power to regulate abortion."
2023	Heidi Przybyla	Politico	"for exclusive coverage of the unprecedented leak of a draft Supreme Court opinion overturning Roe v. Wade and giving states the power to regulate abortion."
2023	Alex Ward	Politico	"for exclusive coverage of the unprecedented leak of a draft Supreme Court opinion overturning Roe v. Wade and giving states the power to regulate abortion."
2023	Staff	The New York Times	"for its urgent and comprehensive coverage of New York City's deadliest fire in decades, expertly combining accountability reporting across platforms with compassionate portraits of the 17 victims and the Gambian community that had long called the Bronx high-rise home."
2024	Staff	Lookout Santa Cruz	"for its detailed and nimble community-focused coverage, over a holiday weekend, of catastrophic flooding and mudslides that displaced thousands of California residents and destroyed more than 1,000 homes and businesses."
2024	Staff	Honolulu Civil Beat	"for its distinctive, sweeping and urgent coverage of the Maui wildfires that killed more than 100 people and left a historic town in ruins, reporting that held officials to account and chronicled the aftermath and efforts to rebuild."
2024	Staff	Los Angeles Times	"for urgent and thoughtful coverage of a Lunar New Year overnight shooting that left 11 senior citizens dead, demonstrating clear knowledge of and commitment to the local Asian communities."
2025	Staff	The Washington Post	"for urgent and illuminating coverage of the July 13 attempt to assassinate then-presidential candidate Donald Trump, including detailed story-telling and sharp analysis that coupled traditional police reporting with audio and visual forensics."
2025	Staff	Associated Press	"for fast, comprehensive and authoritative coverage of the assassination attempt on then-presidential candidate Donald Trump, including vivid details from the scene followed by the first reporting on gaps in security measures by the Secret Service and local law enforcement."
2025	Staff	The Charlotte Observer	"for collaborating on comprehensive and community-focused reporting on Hurricane Helene, which killed more than 200 people and damaged 70,000 homes and businesses in the western part of the state."
2025	Staff	The News and Observer	"for collaborating on comprehensive and community-focused reporting on Hurricane Helene, which killed more than 200 people and damaged 70,000 homes and businesses in the western part of the state."
2026	Staff	The Minnesota Star Tribune	"for its coverage of a shooting at a back-to-school Mass at a Catholic school that left two children dead and 17 wounded, powerful stories marked by thoroughness and compassion."
2026	Staff	The Seattle Times	"for its coverage of catastrophic flooding from a major storm system that remained over the Pacific Northwest for days, work that in real time warned residents, relayed the stories of affected communities and explained how weather and geography combined to cause the devastation."
2026	Staff	Southern California News Group	"for their coverage of the unrelenting wildfires that ravaged Los Angeles communities and killed 31 people, reporting that included the fires' immediate aftermath and accountability-driven analysis."
2026	Staff	The Wall Street Journal	"for their comprehensive and compelling coverage of deadly Texas flooding, including the failures and technical errors that led to the tragedy and heartrending narratives of its impact."
