= Akili Ramsess =

American photographer and journalist

Akili Ramsess is an African American photographer, editor, and photojournalist. Formerly, the director of photography for the Orlando Sentinel, she served as executive director of the National Press Photographers Association beginning in 2016. Ramsess has won two Pulitzer Prizes for her work with her colleagues covering the 1992 presidential campaign and the 1994 Northridge earthquake.
