= 1929 Ottawa sewer explosion =

Disaster in Ottawa, Canada

On May 29, 1929, a series of explosions in the sewers of Ottawa, Ontario, Canada, killed one person.

The first blast occurred just after noon in the Golden Triangle area, west of the canal; over the next 25 minutes, a series of explosions travelled the length of the main line of the sewer system. The explosions first moved east under the canal and then moved through Sandy Hill under Somerset Street. After passing under the Rideau River, they followed the line as it turned north through what is today Vanier, before going through New Edinburgh to the point where the sewer system emptied into the Ottawa River.

The blasts were fairly small, except when manhole covers were involved. At these points, the access to oxygen fuelled towering flames that erupted through the manhole covers onto city streets. The covers themselves were blown high into the air.

Most of the damage from the sewer explosions occurred where sewage lines were attached to less sturdy pipes inside houses; blasts destroyed the plumbing in many residential basements. Besides property damage, the explosions caused one death and many injuries.

The cause of the explosions was never definitively determined. Methane naturally occurs in sewers, but it never accumulates in a concentration powerful enough to cause explosions of the magnitude seen in Ottawa. The Ottawa Gas Company vehemently insisted that the disaster could not have been caused by its lines.

It is now thought that the fuel stations and mechanic shops in the city—new since the introduction of the automobile—contributed to the calamity. While these shops were required by law to dispose of all waste oils in a safe manner, there were no inspections; dumping waste into the sewage system was commonplace. In combination with problems in the sewer system's design, this pollution likely caused the 1929 blasts.

== See also ==
- 1981 Louisville sewer explosions
- 1992 Guadalajara explosions
- 2014 Kaohsiung gas explosions

== Bibliography ==
- "Article preview. One dead in blasts of Ottawa sewers; Several others are injured and buildings are wrecked in wholesale outbursts. Residents leave home. Woman, 71, succumbs to burns after flames from explosion set fire to her home. Various theories on blasts. Three injured at store". The New York Times. May 29, 1929.
- "Ready to make known facts regarding sewer explosion". Ottawa Citizen. Aug 17, 1931. p. 7. "...Mr. Campbell of Boston had reported that it was due to gasoline; when challenged, however, he could not find any substantiation for the statement in the report."
- "Tennis club wins suit against city. Judgment costs Ottawa $3,790.30 for damages to property". The Montreal Gazette. Jan 7, 1936. p. 6. "...John Campbell, an engineer who investigated sewer gas explosions that occurred in Ottawa in 1929..."
