= Margo Huston =

American journalist

- Born: February 12, 1943 (age 83); Waukesha, Wisconsin, USA
- Education: BA, Journalism, 1965, Marquette University
- Occupation: Journalist
- Spouse: James Huston (m. 1967, divorced)
- Children: 1
- Awards: 1977, Pulitzer Prize for Breaking News Reporting

Margo Huston (nee Bremner; born February 12, 1943) is an American reporter. She won the 1977 Pulitzer Prize for Breaking News Reporting while working at the Milwaukee Journal Sentinel.

== Early life and education ==
Huston was born on February 12, 1943, to parents James and Cecil Bremner in Waukesha, Wisconsin. She attended Marquette University and graduated in 1965 with a degree in journalism.

== Career ==
Huston joined the Milwaukee Journal Sentinel in 1967 as a feature writer and was eventually promoted to editorial writer During her time at the Journal, she was one of three women elected to the Waukesha County Draft Board. An article published in 1975 on abortion earned her a $1,000 prize from the Penney‐Missouri newspaper awards competition.

After she was discouraged from applying for a promotion in the Journal's news department, Huston was given an assignment on alternative nursing homes for the elderly. While conducting research, she discovered the poor and neglectful homes elderly people were living in and their lack of health care access. The published report on her discoveries earned her the 1977 Pulitzer Prize for Breaking News Reporting. Two years after becoming the first female journalist from Milwaukee Journal to earn a Pulitzer, she was promoted to the business and editorial page position. Huston later received the 1980 By-Line Award from Marquette University's School of Journalism and the Milwaukee Press Club Knights of the Golden Quill.

== Personal life ==
Huston and her former husband James Huston had one child together.
