= 1992 Guadalajara explosions =

Series of explosions in Guadalajara, Mexico

Coordinates: 20°40′17″N 103°21′23″W

- Location of Guadalajara
- Date: April 22, 1992
- Time: 10:05–11:16 (UTC-6)
- Location: Analco, Guadalajara, Jalisco, Mexico
- Also known as: Guadalajara gas explosion
- Deaths: 206
- Injuries: 500+
- Property damage: Thousands of homes affected
- Charges: 4 Pemex officials charged for negligence
- Verdict: Not guilty

A series of ten explosions took place on April 22, 1992, in the downtown district of Analco Colonia Atlas in Guadalajara city, Jalisco state, Mexico. Numerous gasoline explosions in the sewer system and fires over four hours destroyed 8 kilometres (5.0 mi) of streets. Gante Street was the most damaged.

By the accounting of Lloyd's of London, the reported number of people killed was about 252, although many estimate that the catastrophe actually caused at least 1,000 deaths. About 500 to 600 people were missing, nearly 500 were injured and 15,000 were left homeless. The estimated monetary damage ranges between $300 million and $3 billion. The affected areas can be recognized by the more modern architecture in the areas that were destroyed.

Four days before the explosion, residents started complaining of a strong gas-like smell coming from the sewers which became progressively more pungent over the course of those days. They were experiencing symptoms such as stinging in their eyes and throats; and nausea. Some residents even found gasoline coming out of their water pipes. City workers were dispatched to check the sewers and found dangerously high levels of gasoline fumes. However, the city mayor did not feel it was necessary to evacuate the city because he felt that there was no risk of an explosion.

== Chronology of events ==
Before the explosions, on April 19, Gante Street residents reported a strong stench of gasoline and plumes of white smoke coming out from the sewers to the City of Guadalajara. The next day, workers of the City Council and Civil Protection commenced two days of investigations in Gante Street; they found high levels of gasoline among other hydrocarbons, but announced it was not necessary to evacuate the area. At 10 am on April 22, manhole covers in the street began to bounce and columns of white smoke started coming out of them.

At 10:05 am on April 22, the first two explosions were recorded, the first on the corner of Calzada Independencia and Aldama Street, and the second at the intersection of Gante and 20 de Noviembre. A minute later the first call was received on the 060 Emergency Line and was forwarded to automatic voice messenger. A third explosion three minutes later resulted in a bus, belonging to the Tuts Company, being projected through the air on the corner of Gante and Nicolás Bravo. Four minutes later another explosion was registered in González Gallo Avenue. At 10:15 a.m. factory workers along González Gallo Avenue began to evacuate, just before rescue teams and volunteers began to arrive in areas affected by the explosions. At 10:23 a.m. the fifth explosion occurred, at the intersection of Gante and Calzada del Ejército. At 10:29 a.m. evacuations began in the Mexicaltzingo neighborhood, two minutes before the sixth explosion was recorded at the intersection of 5 de Febrero and Río Bravo.

At 10:43 a.m. the seventh explosion occurred, at the corner of Gante Street and Silverio García. Just after more rescue teams arrived in the affected areas, the eighth explosion occurred at 11:02, at the intersection of Río Nilo Avenue and Río Grande. After this explosion the neighborhoods of Atlas, Álamo Industrial, El Rosario, Quinta Velarde and Fraccionamiento Revolución; and the center of the municipality of Tlaquepaque; were evacuated. The last two explosions were at 11:16, one at the intersection of Río Alamos and Río Pecos, and the other at González Gallo and Río Suchiate. In the afternoon, the fear of further tragedies made people across the Guadalajara Metro Area uncover manholes for any remaining gases to escape. Residents of neighborhoods such as Zona Industrial, 18 de Marzo, Fresno, 8 de Julio, Ferrocarril, La Nogalera, Morelos, Echeverría, Polanco, 5 de Mayo and Miravalle were told to be aware of any unusual events.

After the explosions, there was great panic on April 25 among residents of the neighborhoods 5 de Mayo, el Deán, Echeverría and Polanco; firefighters asked people to avoid lighting any flames, due to a strong smell of gas. It was later confirmed to be a leak in a Pemex pipe.

== Investigation ==
An investigation into the disaster found that there were two precipitating causes:

- New water pipes, made of zinc-coated iron, were built too close to an existing steel gasoline pipeline. The underground humidity caused these materials to create an electrolytic reaction, akin to that which occurs inside a zinc-carbon battery. As the reaction proceeded it eventually caused the steel pipe to corrode, creating a hole in the pipeline that permitted gasoline to leak into the ground and into the main sewer pipe.
- The sewer pipe had been recently rebuilt into a U-shape so that the city could expand its underground metro railway system. Usually sewers are built sloping so that gravity helps move waste along. In order to get the U-shape to work, an inverted siphon was placed so that fluids could be pushed underneath by gravity. Inverted siphons require a uniform fluid for proper operation. With liquids of different densities, only the densest passes through the siphon. In this case the water passed through and left the lighter gasoline trapped upstream. As the liquid gasoline accumulated, evaporation progressed upstream from the siphon (eastward from the metro line), gradually filling the sewers with explosive vapors.

== Aftermath ==
In the aftermath, city officials and corporations blamed each other. Some people initially thought a cooking oil manufacturing company was leaking hexane, a flammable liquid similar to (and a component of) gasoline, into the sewers, but this was later found to be erroneous. Numerous arrests were made in an attempt to indict those responsible for the blasts. Four Pemex officials were indicted and charged, on the basis of negligence. Ultimately, however, these people were cleared of all charges.

Many of the survivors that were affected by the explosions started a group called "La Asociación 22 de Abril en Guadalajara" (Association of April 22 of Guadalajara). This campaign was started by a survivor of the explosions named Lilia Ruiz Chávez, who as a result of the explosions lost her leg as well as her home. She started the group that has a total of 80 members not only because no one was convicted of this preventable incident but also because the victims of this tragedy were not receiving any compensation or assistance due to injuries sustained or loss as a result of the explosion. The victims of this tragedy not only lost their homes but also their health and many lost loved ones as well. Although they are aware that no amount of money will bring back their relatives as states Chávez, the tragedy left them unable to care for themselves let alone afford their medication as a consequence of the incident.

Chávez and other survivors for more than two decades advocated for those responsible to be held accountable. Because of the constant struggle and pressure from the victims toward Pemex, the company that was initially blamed for the incident, Pemex finally agreed to pay out MX$40 million to the group, although Pemex claims this is a donation and no way does it mean they are taking blame for the incident.

== See also ==
- List of Seconds from Disaster episodes
- Humberto Vidal explosion
- 2014 Kaohsiung gas explosions
- Louisville sewer explosions
- 1929 Ottawa sewer explosion
- East Boston gas surge
