= Sylvan Fox =

American journalist

Sylvan Fox (June 2, 1928 – December 22, 2007) was an American journalist who won a Pulitzer Prize. He worked as a reporter in upstate New York before he came to the New York City-based World-Telegram newspaper. He wrote one of the first books critical of the 1964 report by the Warren Commission on the assassination of President John F. Kennedy, The Unanswered Questions about the Kennedy Assassination. From 1967 to 1973, he worked as a reporter and editor at The New York Times, including a stint as the Saigon bureau chief in 1973. He went on to spend 15 years at Newsday, where he was editorial page editor from 1979 to 1988.

Fox was a reporter at The New York World-Telegram and Sun on March 1, 1962, when he was part of a team assigned to cover an airplane crash on Long Island that killed all 95 passengers. He worked the facts provided by other reporters on the scene and delivered an article within thirty minutes of the accident. He rewrote the article for seven editions of the paper, adding new details as they came in. Within 90 minutes of the crash, he had produced a 3,000-word story. The next year he shared with colleagues Anthony Shannon and William Longgood the Pulitzer Prize for Local Reporting, Edition Time — referring to work under pressure of a deadline, a predecessor of the Breaking News Pulitzer.

Fox grew up in Brooklyn. He was a classically trained pianist and spent four years at the Juilliard School of Music, but left without a degree because of his decision to change his major from piano to musical composition. There he met Gloria Endleman, a fellow piano student, who became his wife and who survives him.

Fox graduated from Brooklyn College with a degree in philosophy, then earned a master's degree in musicology from the University of California, Berkeley.

Fox was a visiting professor at Long Island University's Brooklyn Campus in 1967 and 1968, where he taught journalism courses.

He died, aged 79, in New York University's Medical Center from complications from pneumonia.

== Bibliography ==
- The Unanswered Questions about President Kennedy's Assassination. Award Books. 1965.
