= Water supply and sanitation in Taiwan =

Water supply and sanitation in Taiwan is characterized by uneven distribution of precipitation and a dense population.

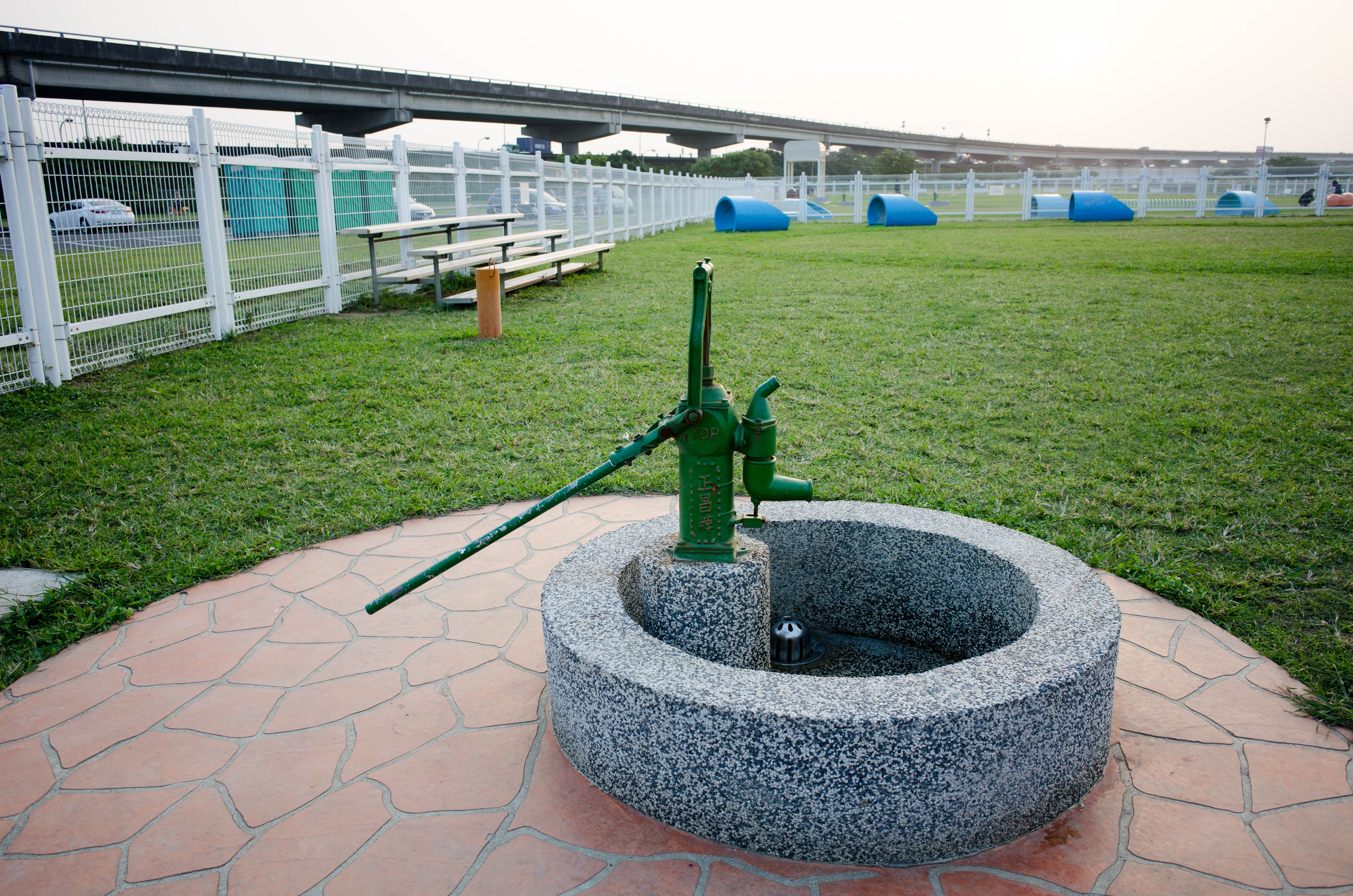
Piston water pump at the Yingfeng Riverside Park in Taipei.

== Water resources ==
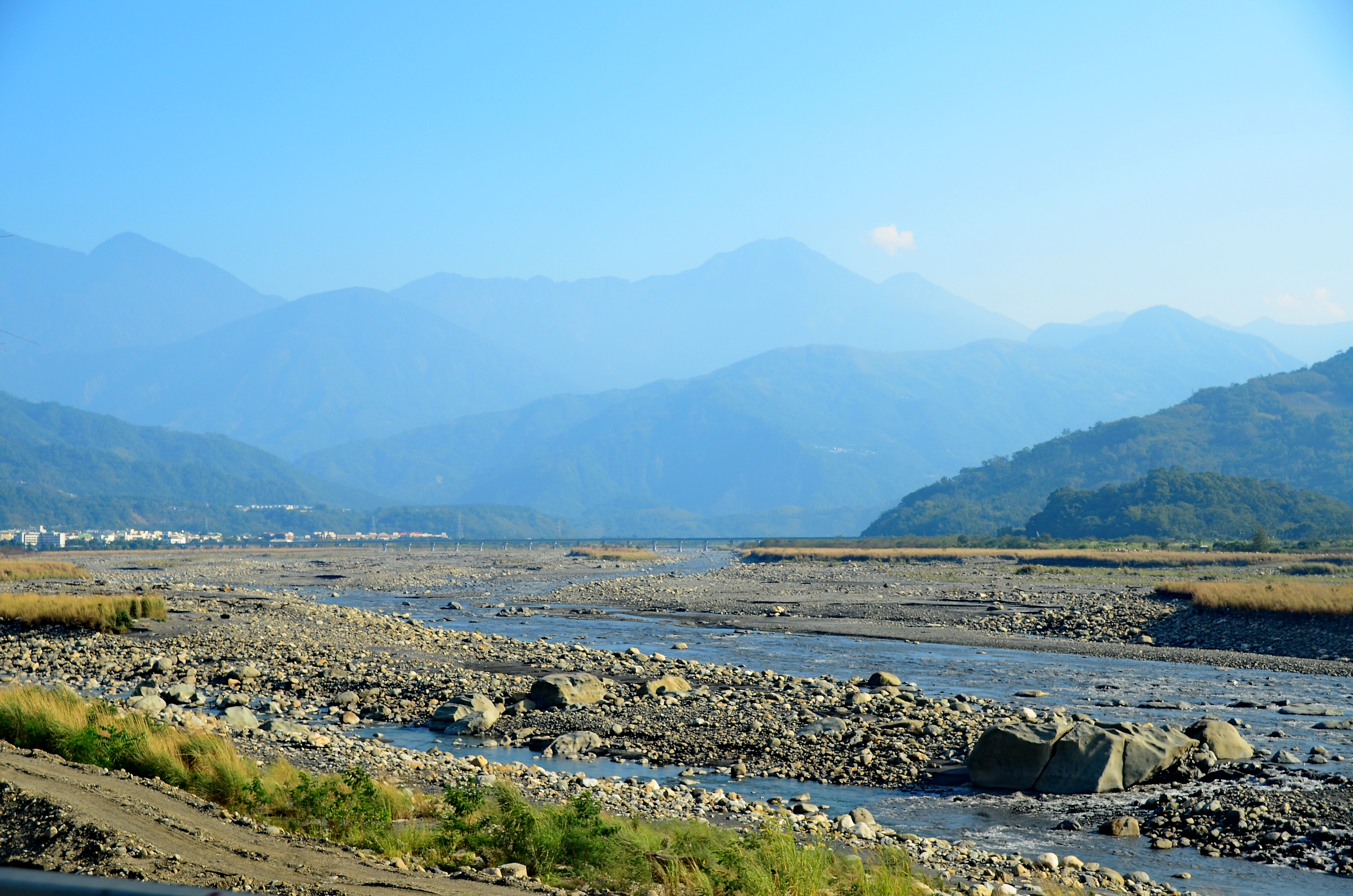
The Zhuoshui River, Taiwan's longest river, runs from east to west.

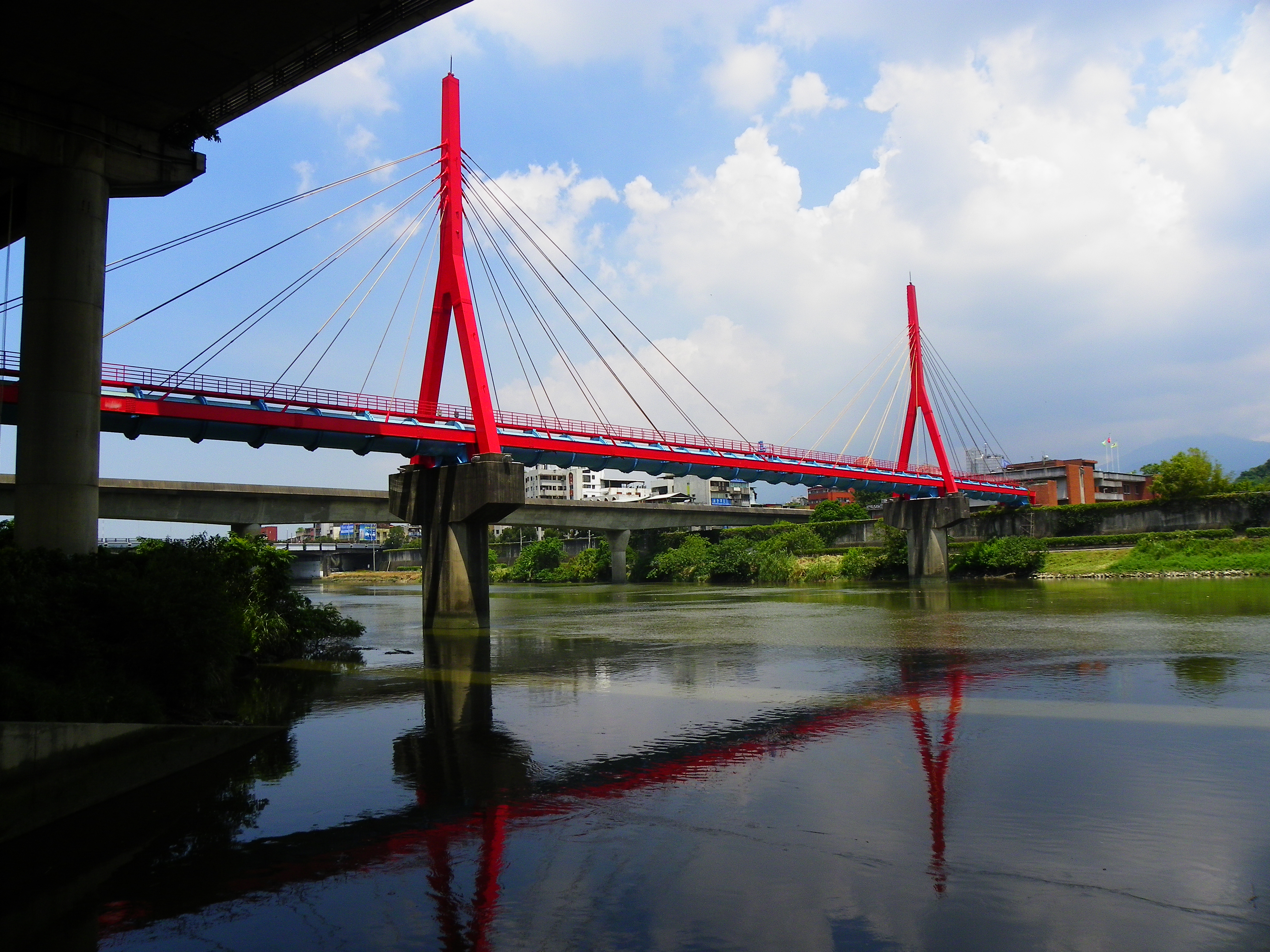
An aqueduct across the Keelung River.

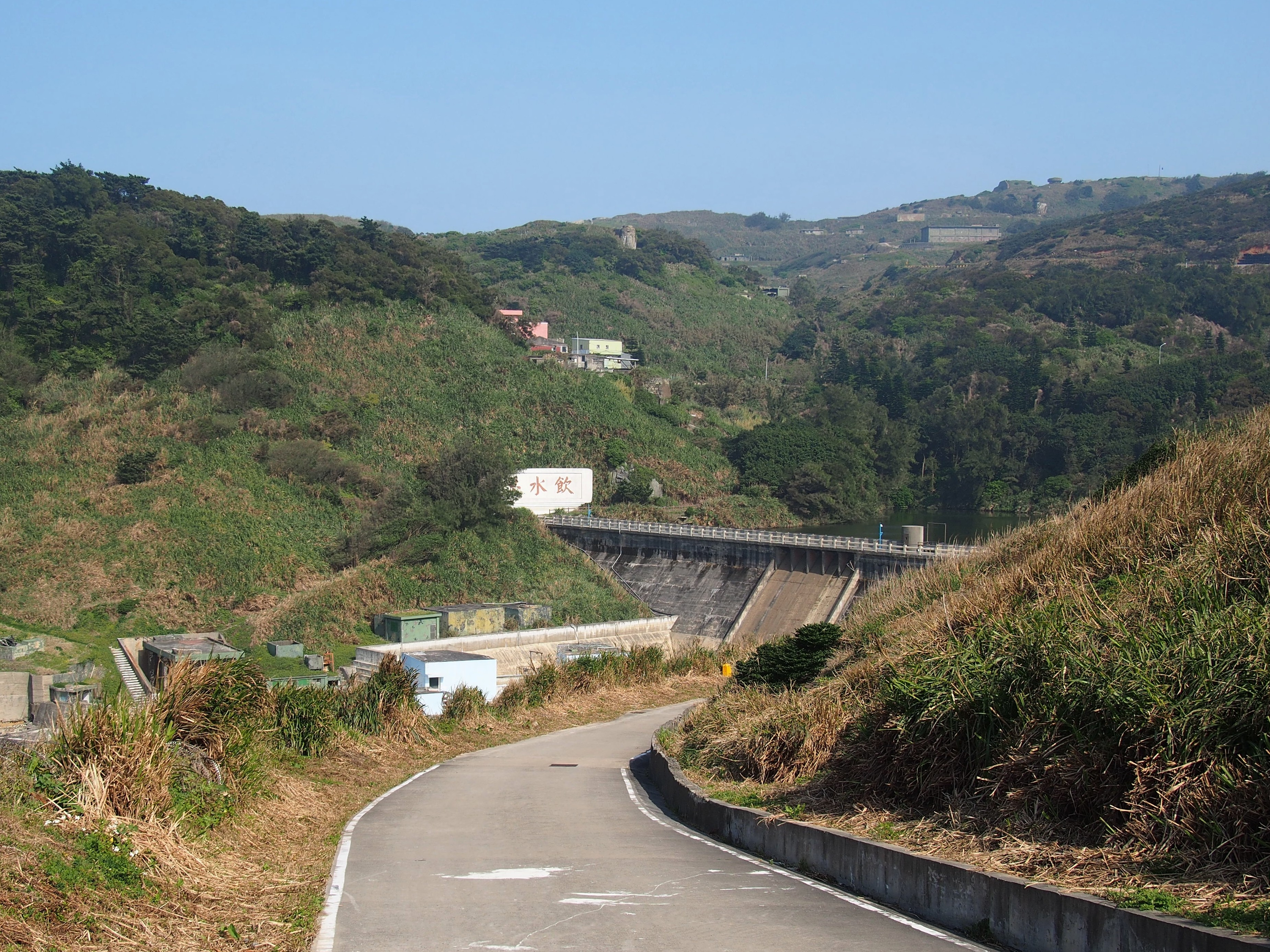
A reservoir in Dongyin, Lienchiang County

The Central Mountain Range is the main mountain range running from north to south of the island. Most of the rivers on the island flow from east to west following the contour of the mountains. Although the annual rainfall is up to 2,510 mm, which is 2.5 times higher than the world's average, the distribution of the rainfall is not even due to the geographical condition of Taiwan.

In the period of 2000–2009, Taiwan had 95.07 billion tons of annual rain precipitation. From there, 20.00 billion tons evaporated (21%), 70.10 billion tons became surface runoff (74%) and 4.97 billion tons became groundwater (5%). Added from groundwater overdraft of 0.63 billion tons, the total groundwater pumping was 5.60 billion tons. From the surface runoff water, 54.70 billion tons was discharged to the sea, 4.35 billion tons became water supply for reservoirs and 11.05 billion tons became river water diversion.

Half of Taiwan's water is supplied by typhoons.

=== Water scarcity ===
Despite its high annual rainfall, Taiwan is only able to use 20% of it as water resource, making it in the 18th place under the United Nations global ranking in terms of being water resource poor region.

=== Kinmen ===
In Kinmen, water supply has been scarce over the past decades due to its shallow lakes, lack of rainfall and geographical constraints which makes building reservoirs and dams unfeasible. Water from reservoirs is barely enough to meet the demand during dry seasons. Therefore, Kinmen often overuse its groundwater for up to 8,000 tonnes per day, causing rising tidal flood and soil salinity.

In early September 2013 after Kinmen Deputy Commissioner Wu You-qin led a delegation to visit mainland China, the Chinese government agreed to supply Kinmen with water from Jinjiang City in Fujian. An undersea 16.7 km water pipeline will be built to carry water from the Shanmei Reservoir in Jinjiang city to coastal area of Kinmen. The pipeline is expected to deliver a maximum amount of 30,000 tonnes of water each day to Kinmen. A further 300 meter of water pipe will be constructed to a water treatment plant.

On 23–24 May 2015, Head of Taiwan Affairs Office Zhang Zhijun visited Kinmen to discuss the water supply plan from Fujian to Kinmen. The initial stage is to supply 15,000 m^{3} of fresh water a day, to be increased to 34,000 m^{3} a day in the medium-term and to 55,000 m^{3} in the long-term. The water company in Fujian will build a pumping station and pipeline to the coastal town of Bingzhou and the pipeline will be connected to a 17 km underground water pipeline to Tianpu in Kinmen which will cost NT$1.35 billion.

== Water consumption ==
The annual per capita water allowance is 4,000 m^{3} and the current average water consumption per capita in Taiwan is 271 liter per day. In 2001, the annual water usage for Taiwan was 18,600 million tons, which was divided into agriculture (12,290 million tons), domestic (3,600 million tons), industry (1,750 million tons) and conservation (9,600 million tons).

Reservoir water supply, river water diversion and groundwater pumping made up the total water consumption for Taiwanese, which was 21.00 billion tons in total. Among them, 3.53 billion tons was used for household consumption (20%), 1.66 billion tons was used for industrial consumption (9%) and 15.81 billion tons was used for agricultural consumption. In 2023 drought forced cuts to agricultural water consumption.

== Institutions ==
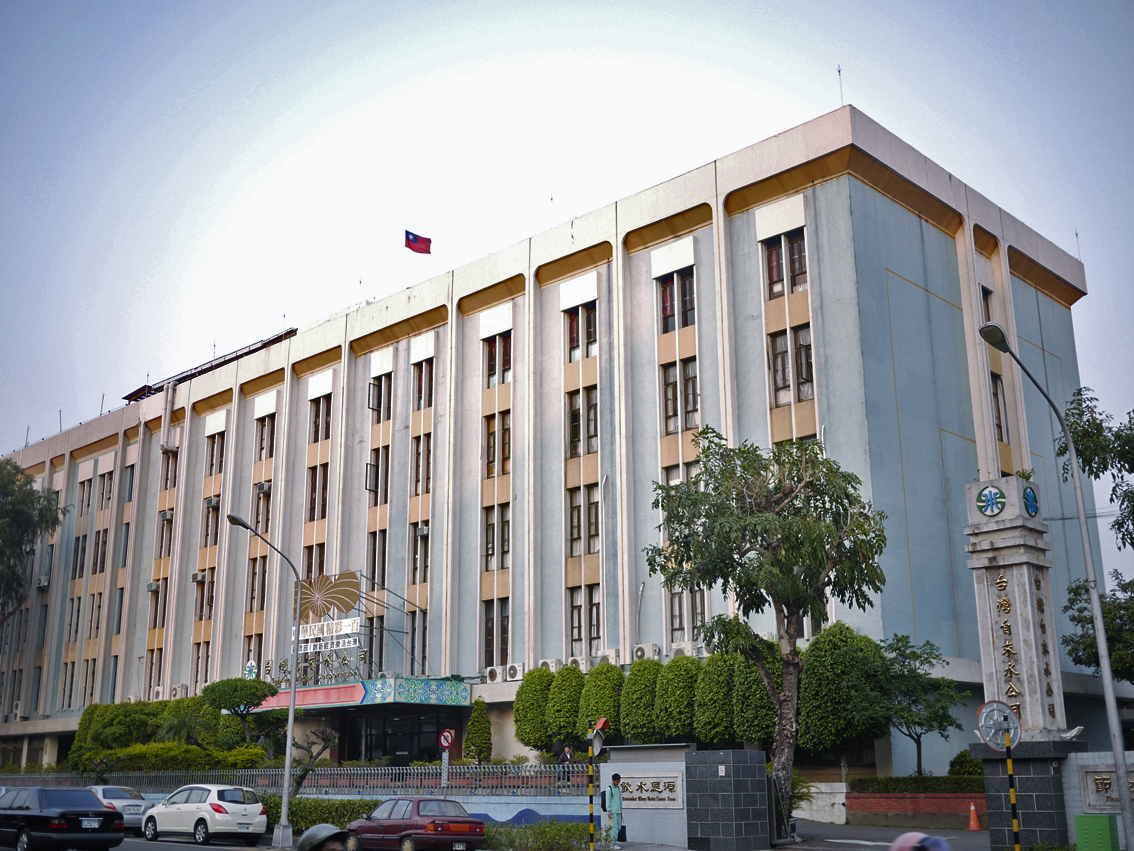
Taiwan Water Corporation headquarters in Taichung.

Taiwan Water Corporation is the state-owned water utility providing water supply to most of Taiwan.

== See also ==
- Water pollution
- Water security
- Energy security
- Energy in Taiwan
- Transportation in Taiwan
