= Louisville sewer explosions =

Series of explosions in Louisville, Kentucky (1981)

Coordinates: 38°13′38.7″N 85°46′30.6″W

On February 13, 1981, a series of explosions destroyed more than 13 miles (21 km) of sewer lines and streets in the center of Louisville in Kentucky, United States. The explosions resulted in extensive damage to property and infrastructure; there were no fatalities, but four people were injured.

The blasts were caused by the ignition of hexane vapors which had been illegally discharged from a soybean processing plant owned by Ralston-Purina and located on Floyd Street. The plant had been a processing facility for cottonseed or soybeans since at least 1900.

Repairs to the sewers and streets took about two years. Ralston-Purina paid $18 million to the Louisville Metropolitan Sewer District, about $9 million to about 17,000 plaintiffs in a lawsuit settled in 1984, $4 million to the city, and $2 million to affected members of the public that did not sue the company. The company admitted that it had released hexane into the sewers, but initially did not accept responsibility for the blasts and continued to deny negligence for years until eventually pleading guilty to four counts of violating federal environmental laws and paying the maximum possible fine, $62,500.

== Explosions ==
The Ralston-Purina plant used hexane as a solvent to extract oil from soybeans. The plant employed a containment system designed to recycle used hexane from the process back to the plant. However, the containment system was not functioning that night, and a large quantity of hexane was released into the sewers. The U.S. Government Accountability Office and American Society of Civil Engineers estimated the amount of hexane spilled as being thousands of gallons (roughly 10,000 liters or more), although the company disputed the amount. The hexane then began to vaporize in the sewers and seep out of manholes in the streets. At about 1:30 a.m. on the day of the explosions, the company called an inspector and informed him that there had been some leakage from the facility. The inspector visited the site and checked for vapors on some nearby streets but did not notice a serious problem. The circumstances surrounding the visit by the inspector and the amount and type of information given to him were later disputed.

At approximately 5:16 a.m. on Friday, February 13, 1981, a cascading series of explosions ripped through the southern part of Old Louisville near the University of Louisville. The trigger of the explosions was eventually determined to have been a spark from a car driving near the intersection of 12th and Hill Streets, which ignited the hexane fumes in the street and the sewers. The car contained two women who were on their way to work at the local hospital, and the force of the blast reduced the street to rubble and threw the car onto its side. Officers in a police helicopter that happened to be over the area at the time said the series of explosions looked like a bombing run.

More than 13 miles (21 km) of sewer lines, including the entire two miles (3 km) of the main trunk line with a diameter of 7.5–12 feet (2.3–3.7 m), were destroyed in the blast. Manhole covers shot up into the sky and came crashing down with great destructive force. One manhole cover crashed completely through the ceiling and floor of a third-floor apartment on Second Street, and another narrowly missed a child when it landed in a house at the corner of 9th and Hill streets. The streets under which the sewer lines ran were destroyed – completely fragmenting some streets and leaving large holes in others as much as 38 feet (12 m) deep, exposing raw sewage pits where the sewers had been. In some places, sections of pavement were left standing on end near the gaping holes. Water and gas lines were severed, leaving area residents without service for weeks. The chimneys of 43 buildings fell and some stairways collapsed.

As the day progressed after the major series of explosions, the fumes continued to build up in some areas. "It's still potentially explosive," said Louisville mayor William Stansbury as a 20-block area was being evacuated. A buildup of fumes occurred where the sewers ran under an Ashland Oil refinery, raising the potential for a further major conflagration, but workers were able to flush out the system in the area. At 3:45 pm, the last explosion occurred, blowing out a manhole cover at the intersection of Second Street and Burnett Avenue.

The university and all businesses and other schools in the area were shut down for varying periods (including the shops and restaurants that area residents needed to use, especially as they had no running water and could not access the area by car due to the damage to the streets). The fact that the incident took place in the heart of winter compounded the hardship, and some residents were left without heat until gas lines and furnaces could be tested and repaired. The Kentucky National Guard was called up to control the damaged area, which was declared a disaster area by U.S. President Ronald Reagan. About 2,000 people had to be evacuated, and water and sewage service was disrupted for about 23,000 people. Rain showers followed in the days after the incident, and heavy rains followed later, causing further damage by flooding and eroding the open pits of sewage. Once water service was restored, residents were told to conserve water, boil the water if they needed to drink it, and avoid flushing toilets as much as possible. The open trench along Hill Street remained exposed through the summer, emitting a foul stench for about six months before the system could be enclosed again.

The women in the car that sparked the explosion were injured, but not seriously. The streets were nearly deserted since it was early in the morning, so no fatalities resulted from the blasts.

== Aftermath and legacy ==
After the incident, Ralston-Purina used more than $2 million of city industrial bonds to fund a rebuilding of its facility in 1983, and then sold it in 1984.

In 1985, the city of Louisville and Jefferson County, Kentucky, passed a hazardous materials ordinance in response to the disaster. This ordinance gave the Louisville Metropolitan Sewer District the authority to regulate the handling of hazardous materials.

The incident has been cited by such entities as the American Society of Civil Engineers and the U.S. Government Accountability Office as an example of the need for increased security concerning the United States' wastewater systems, and by the United States Environmental Protection Agency as an example of the dangers associated with discharges of hazardous waste to sewer systems. Articles discussing the event have been published in Environmental Geology and Journal of the American Oil Chemists' Society.

The Ralston-Purina plant, a long-standing landmark recognizable by its 22 large silos topped with a checkerboard logo alongside the southbound lanes of I-65, was sold in the wake of the incident. The site was eventually purchased by the University of Louisville (and in the interim, was repainted as a welcome landmark to U of L with the university's name spelled out on each silo) and demolished in 2014.

== See also ==
- 2018 Merrimack Valley gas explosions
- 2014 Kaohsiung gas explosions
- 1992 Guadalajara explosions
- 1929 Ottawa sewer explosion
- History of Louisville, Kentucky
- List of explosions
