= Golden Triangle, Ottawa =

Coordinates: 45.418056°N 75.686111°W

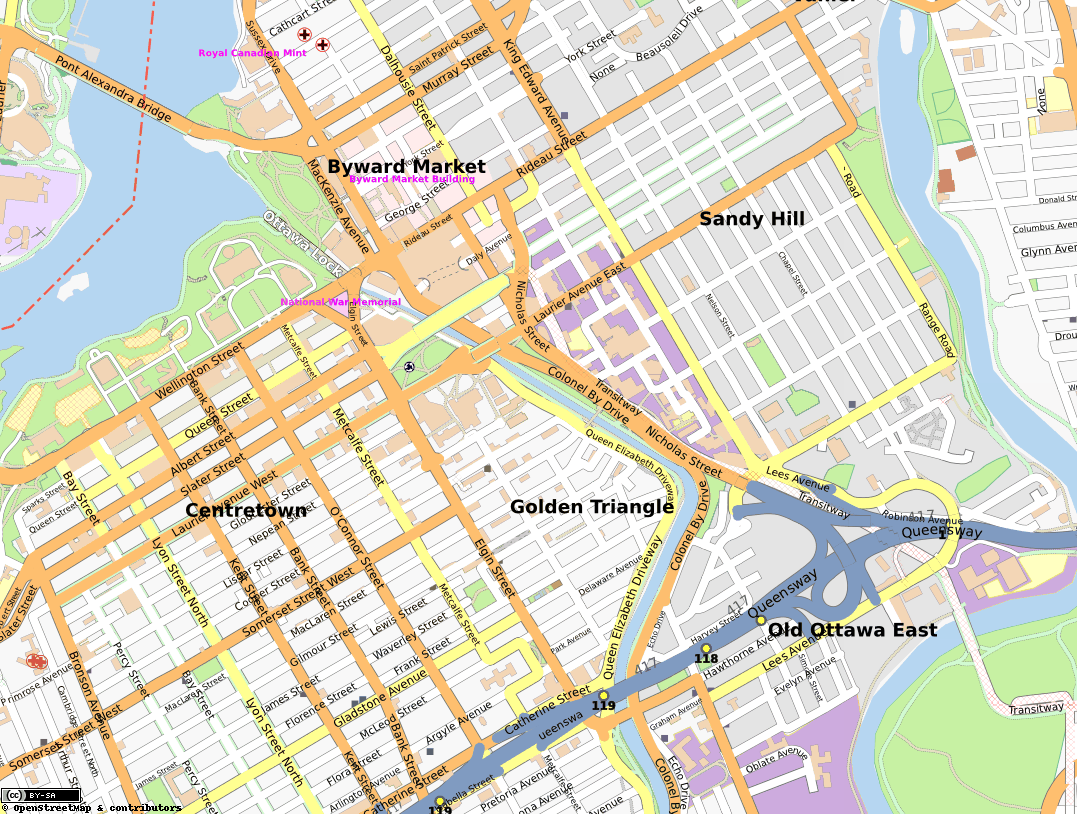
A map showing the Golden Triangle

The Golden Triangle is a sub-neighbourhood of Centretown in Somerset Ward in central Ottawa, Ontario, Canada. It borders Elgin Street, at its west, and the Rideau Canal, at its east. The Ottawa City Hall is to its north and the Elgin Street Police Station to its south. According to the 2016 Canada Census, the total population for this area was 5,778.

It is dominated by large single-family homes although many have since been subdivided, but it contains some condominiums and small apartment buildings.

Its main western thoroughfare, Elgin Street (nicknamed "Sens Mile"), is home to boutiques and galleries, and it is surrounded by restaurants, cafes, bars, and nightclubs. Its eastern thoroughfare, Queen Elizabeth Driveway, runs along the western edge of the Rideau Canal. Along the entire length of Queen Elizabeth Driveway is a multi-use trail, which is part of the Capital Pathway system.

A series of explosions in the sewers caused property damage throughout the area on May 29, 1929.

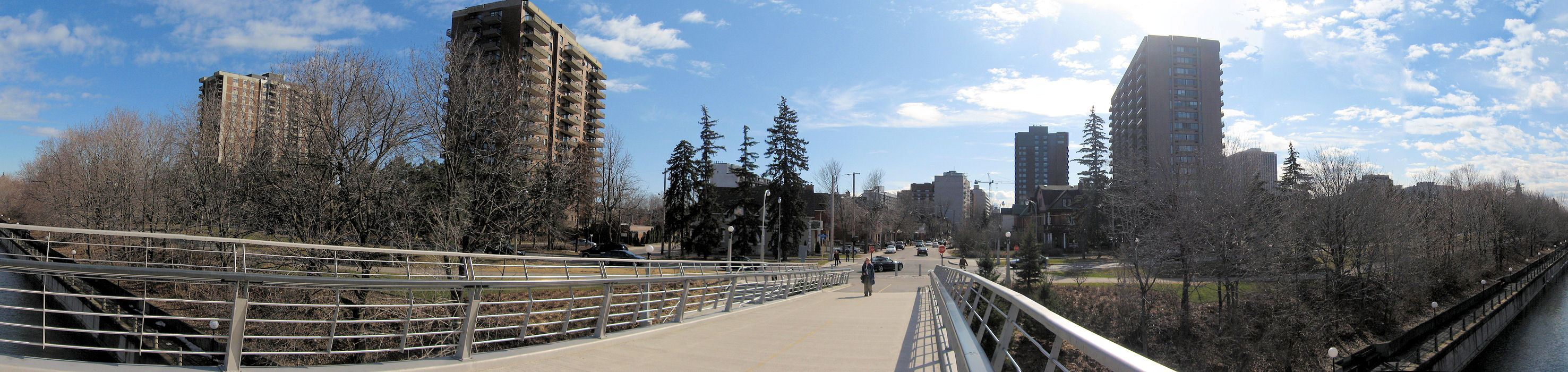
A view of the east side of the Golden Triangle from the Corktown Footbridge

== See also ==
- Corktown, a series of shanties along this section of the Rideau Canal that existed when the Canal was being built
- List of neighbourhoods in Ottawa
