= Robert D. Mullins =

American journalist

Robert D. Mullins (December 16, 1924 - June 8, 2016) won the 1962 Pulitzer Prize for Local Reporting - Edition time (now called Breaking News Reporting) for his work July 4–10, 1961, relating to a murder in Grand County, Utah. At the time he was the Price Bureau chief for the Deseret News, where he worked from 1951 to 1987. He served in the United States military during World War II.
