= Robert D. McFadden =

American journalist (born 1937)

- Born: Robert Dennis McFadden; February 11, 1937 (age 89); Milwaukee, Wisconsin, U.S.
- Education: University of Wisconsin–Eau Claire; University of Wisconsin-Madison (BS)
- Occupation: Journalist
- Years active: 1957–2024
- Notable credit: The New York Times
- Spouse: Judith McFadden
- Children: 1

Robert Dennis McFadden (born February 11, 1937) is an American journalist who worked for The New York Times from 1961 to 2024. He won a Pulitzer Prize in 1996.

== Biography ==
McFadden was born in Milwaukee on February 11, 1937. He was raised in both Chicago and the small town of Cumberland, Wisconsin. He attended the University of Wisconsin–Eau Claire, and graduated from the journalism school of the University of Wisconsin–Madison in 1960 with a B.S. in Journalism. He moved to New York City in 1961 with the intention of applying to only one newspaper—the only paper for which he wanted to work—and his hopes were realized when he was soon hired by The New York Times. His literary writing style, strict adherence to journalistic principles, and tireless ability to "beat the deadline" won him accolades as both a writer and journalist, and he has since received numerous awards for excellence in journalism. McFadden, a celebrated Senior Writer, remained at the Times for over 60 years, until his retirement in September 2024. In 1996, he won the annual Pulitzer Prize for Spot News Reporting, citing "his highly skilled writing and reporting on deadline during the year" (1995).

== Career ==
From 1957 to 1958, McFadden was a reporter for The Wisconsin Rapids Daily Tribune. From 1958 to 1959, he was a reporter for The Wisconsin State Journal in Madison and after he graduated from University of Wisconsin–Madison, worked for The Cincinnati Enquirer. In 1961, he was hired by The New York Times, where he remained for the next six decades as a reporter and rewrite man. His writing has covered a wide range of topics including plane crashes, hurricanes, strikes, blackouts, government affairs, health, crime, transportation, politics, education, the environment, and mass media.

McFadden retired from the Times on September 2, 2024. As of his retirement, he was listed as senior writer on the newspaper's Obituaries desk. Because he focused on advance obituaries, written before the deaths of their subjects, he retired with hundreds of obituaries yet to run.

== Personal life ==
McFadden and his wife Judith have a son named Nolan, and live in Manhattan, New York.

== Awards and honors ==
McFadden has received 18 major journalistic awards and seven New York Times Publisher’s Awards, He was named a Senior Writer in January 1990.

- New York Press Club's Byline Award for Spot News Reporting in 1973, 1974, 1980, 1987 and 1989
- New York Newspaper Guild's Page One Award for Local Reporting
- Peter Kihss Award from the Society of the Silurians
- University of Wisconsin–Madison Chancellor's Award for Distinguished Service to Journalism and Mass Communication

== Bibliography ==
- McFadden, Robert (1981). No hiding place: the New York Times inside report on the hostage crisis. New York: Times Books. ISBN 978-0-8129-0980-7.
- McFadden, Robert (1990). Outrage: The Story Behind the Tawana Brawley Hoax. New York: Bantam Books. ISBN 978-0-553-05756-0.
