= Richard Cooper (journalist) =

American journalist

Richard (Dick) Cooper, (born December 8, 1946) is an American journalist retired from a 28-year career as reporter and editor at The Philadelphia Inquirer. After attending Grand Rapids Community College and graduating from Michigan State University in 1969, Cooper joined the Rochester Times-Union; there, he and John Machacek won the 1972 Pulitzer Prize for Local General or Spot News Reporting for their coverage of the Attica Prison Riots. He currently lives in Saint Michaels, Maryland, where he founded Cooper Media Associates and writes for the Chesapeake Bay Maritime Museum and other clients.

Cooper is an avid sailor and has owned several boats over the years. Currently, he sails Tusitala, a Hinckley Bermuda 40 yawl with a flag-blue hull, out of Saint Michaels, Maryland.
