= 2014 Kaohsiung gas explosions =

Industrial disaster in Kaohsiung, Taiwan

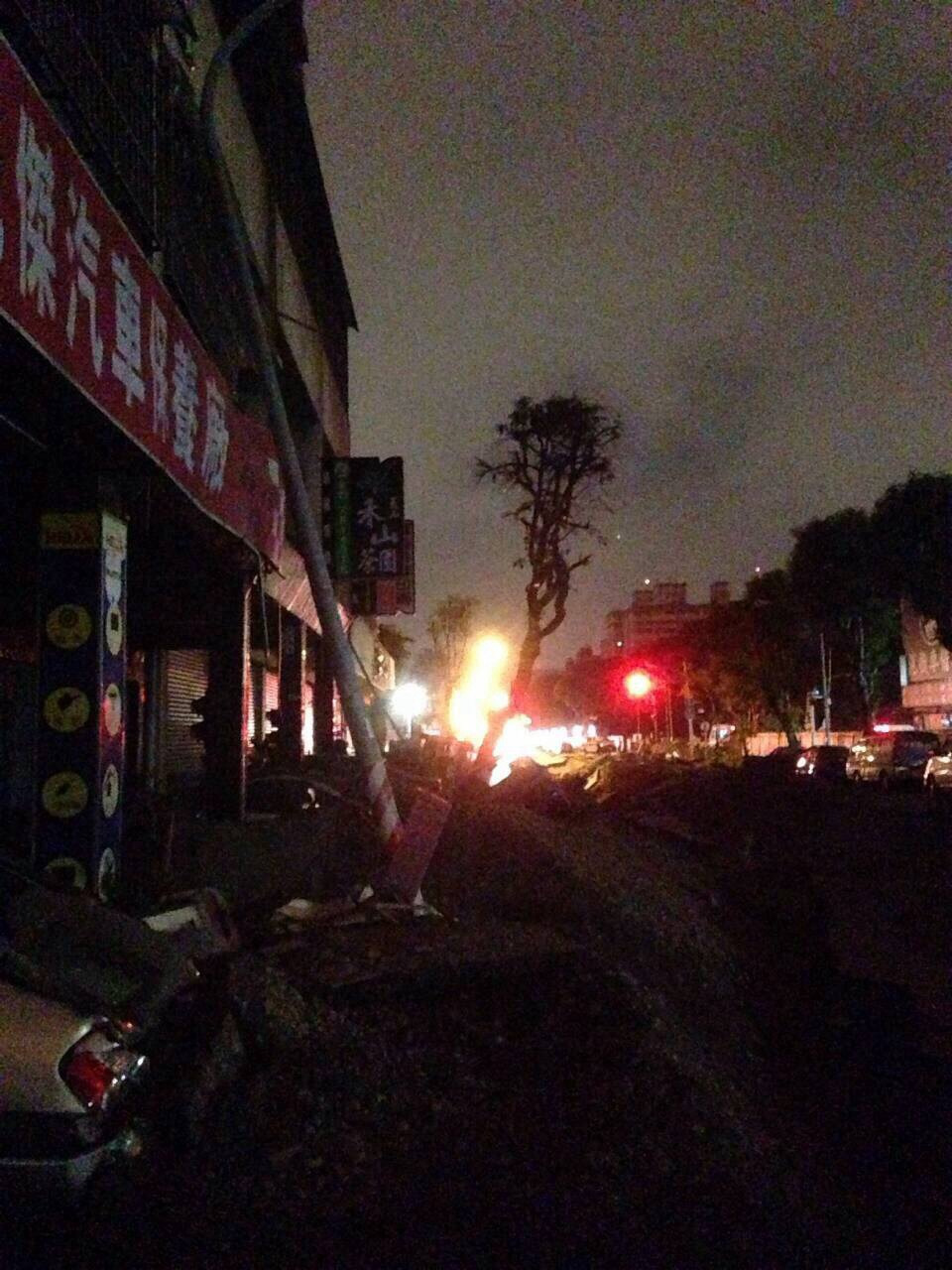
- Aftermath of the explosion at a road in Kaohsiung
- Date: 31 July 2014
- Time: Initial reported gas leak: 20:46 (UTC+8); First explosion: 23:57 (UTC+8)
- Location: Kaohsiung, Taiwan; 22°36′39″N 120°19′8″E
- Cause: Gas leak
- Participants: Fire Bureau, Kaohsiung City Government; Fire Bureau, Tainan City Government; Fire Bureau, Pingtung County Government; Fire Bureau, Taitung County Government; Fire Bureau, Chiayi County Government; Fire Bureau, Chiayi City Government; Fire Bureau, New Taipei City Government; Special Search and Rescue Team, Fire Bureau, Taipei City Government; Special Search and Rescue Team, Fire Bureau, Taoyuan County Government; Special Search and Rescue Team, Fire Bureau, Taichung City Government; Republic of China Marine Corps 99th Brigade; Republic of China Marine Corps Air Defense Group; Republic of China Army 8th Corps Command; Republic of China Army Infantry Training Center; Republic of China Army 39th Chemical Group; Republic of China Army 54th Combat Engineer Group; Republic of China Military Police 204th Garrison; National Airborne Service Corps, Ministry of the Interior
- Deaths: 32
- Injuries: 321

On 31 July 2014, a series of gas explosions occurred in the Cianjhen and Lingya districts of Kaohsiung, Taiwan, following reports of gas leaks earlier that night. Thirty-two people were killed and 321 people were injured.

== Event ==
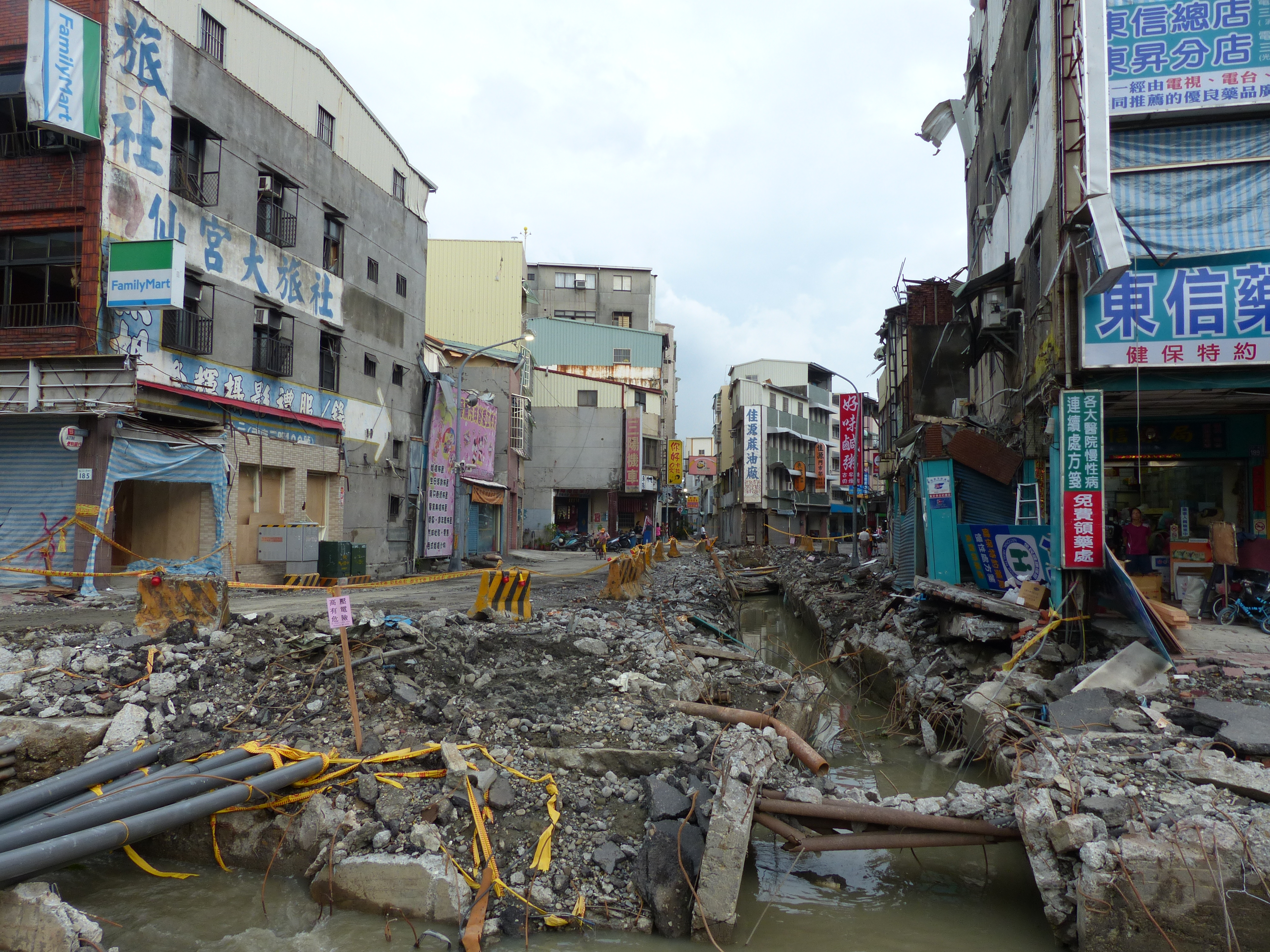
Damage on Sanduo 1st Road after the explosions

=== The explosions ===
Eyewitnesses reported a smell of gas and white smoke coming out of manholes near Kaisyuan 3rd Road and Ersheng 1st Road in Cianjhen District on 31 July 2014 at 20:46, over three hours prior to the incident. The explosions occurred later at 23:57 on Yisin Road, Ersheng Road, Sanduo Road and Guanghua Road.

Witnesses reported seeing fireballs soaring into the sky and flames reaching 15 stories high. The blasts ripped up roads, trapped and overturned cars and firetrucks, and caused a blackout to the electrical grid. About 6 km of road length were damaged. The explosions reportedly blew cars and motorcycles high up in the air; some vehicles and victims were found at the rooftops of buildings three or four stories high. One street had been split along its length, swallowing fire trucks and other vehicles.

Premier Jiang Yi-huah stated that there had been at least five blasts around the city. The blasts cut gas supplies to 23,600 households, electricity to 12,000 households, and water to 8,000 households.

Firefighters from Kaohsiung City, Chiayi City, Pingtung County, Tainan City and Taitung County rushed to the scene to extinguish the fires and help the rescue efforts. Some of the firefighters also sprayed water on the roads in the hope to reduce the ground temperature. During the incident, four firefighters died, with two of them going missing; the explosions also injured 22 other emergency workers. The Taiwanese army was also dispatched and arrived at the site within two hours after the initial explosion.

Emergency rooms in hospitals around Kaohsiung were packed with casualties that night, with most of them having suffered cuts and burns. Some of the injured people had to be carried to hospitals by trucks due to the lack of ambulances. All of the casualties were sent to more than 20 hospitals around the city, including Chung-Ho Memorial Hospital, Kaohsiung Veterans General Hospital, Chang Gung Memorial Hospital, Yuan's General Hospital, Armed Forces General Hospital, and Kaohsiung Municipal United Hospitals.

=== Rescue efforts ===
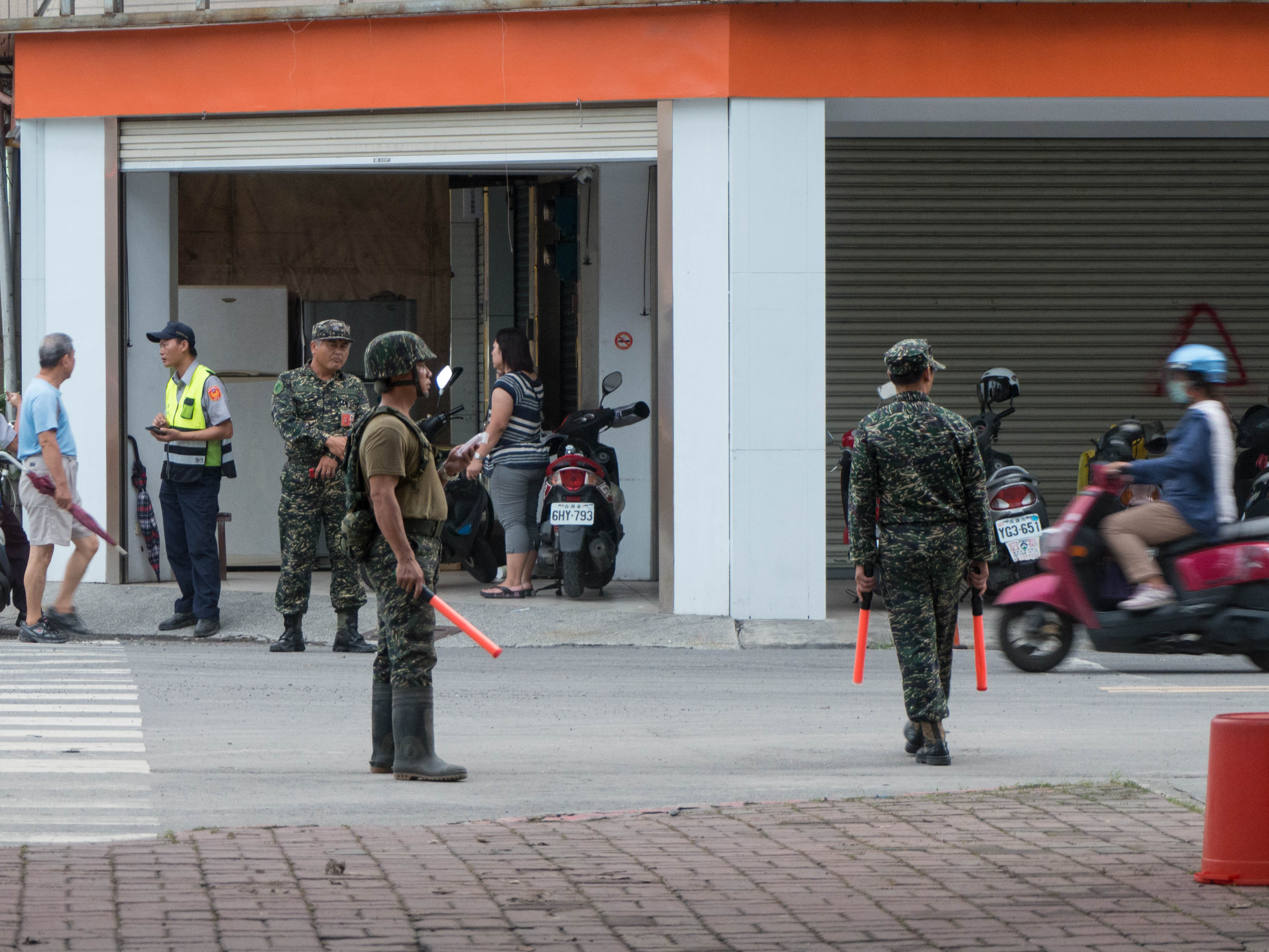
Taiwanese marine officers from the 99th Marine Brigade controlling traffic on Fude 3rd Road

By the following morning, most of the fires had been fully extinguished or had burnt out by themselves, but a few remained. Paramedics, search and rescue dogs and helicopters swept the area looking for survivors. Heavy construction equipment was brought to the blast site to begin removing debris from the street. Schools and offices were closed on that day and residents were asked to leave their houses to smooth out the search and rescue operations. By afternoon, hundreds of people who fled the explosion scenes had returned home after houses around the explosion areas had been declared safe by the city spokesman. They confirmed that no more explosions could happen and that all of the fire had been put out. Traffic restrictions were put in place on Sanduo, Guanghua, Yixin, and Kaisyuan Roads. Taiwan Area National Freeway Bureau also closed the northbound exit from Sun Yat-sen Freeway to Sanduo Road. However, Kaohsiung MRT and buses were not affected by the search and rescue works.

To help the city in the rescue efforts, at 22:30 on Friday night the Taiwan Power Company (Taipower) shut down their four sets of generators fed with liquid natural gas, even though none of their pipelines had been damaged during the explosions. The shutdown lowered Taiwan's total electricity output by 1,100 MW, or about 2.7% of the total capacity. The decision to stop the supply was reached after a discussion between the Kaohsiung City Government and the oil refinery CPC Corporation, so that road repair and other disaster relief work could proceed without interruption. With their total generation expected to reach 36,970 MW in the peak hours of the coming week, Taipower has an excess capacity of 3,170 MW and thus can still meet the local energy demand in Kaohsiung. As a precaution, China Petrochemical Development Co., which also operates in Kaohsiung, reduced the gas pressure in its propene pipelines.

On Sunday, another 1,885 servicemen were deployed for the search and rescue operation at the explosion sites, bringing the total servicemen deployed during the incident to 5,567 people. Included among the servicemen were the chemical detection troops who continued to monitor any leaking gas. Equipment such as 22 ambulances, three chemical-detection vehicles, 13 excavators, 26 life detecting monitors, and other equipment were also being used in the rescue efforts. The rescue works attracted many passerby to watch, wander, or even for an "adventure date" in conjunction with Chinese Valentine's Day, a move considered disrespectful for the dead. The police had to ask them to leave and ask the public to stay away from the areas where the explosions occurred, citing the fragility of the ground or the ruined buildings around.

=== Immediate aftermath ===
The remaining 260 tons of propene inside the damaged pipes was vented out completely by Monday from both of their input and output points. Nitrogen gas was put into pipes ensuring all propene had been removed, a move which had been done earlier by the CPC. The Environmental Protection Administration also had dispatched personnel to Kaohsiung to assist local government in air pollution monitoring.

On 5 August, the Kaohsiung District Prosecutor's Office issued the death certificates of two missing firefighters who had fought the fires caused by the gas explosions, despite their bodies having yet to be found. The prosecutors said that rescuers could not find the bodies and suspected that they might have been vaporized from the explosions.

On 8 August, another gas leak was reported in Cianjhen District shortly before 7:50 a.m causing widespread panic among residents. People who lived within 150 meters radius of Kaisyuan 3rd Road were evacuated the city police department to Kaohsiung Municipal Guanghua Junior High School and Le Chyuan Elementary School, raising concern among residents over their safety. Authorities tried to pin down the source of the gas and they dispatched personnel to the intersection of Yisin and Kaisyuan Roads. The gas concentration level reading peaked at 5,000 ppm at around 11 a.m which was mostly methane. However, by 14:30 the concentration level finally dropped below 10 ppm. Early measurements indicated that at least four gases leaked were methane, propene, ethylene and butane.

On 9 August, the Kaohsiung City Government ordered LCY to halt all of operations until its plan to improve pipeline safety had been reviewed by the government. Should LCY refuse to do so, the government would notify the Taipower and Taiwan Water Corporation to stop providing the company with electricity and water respectively.

== Investigation ==
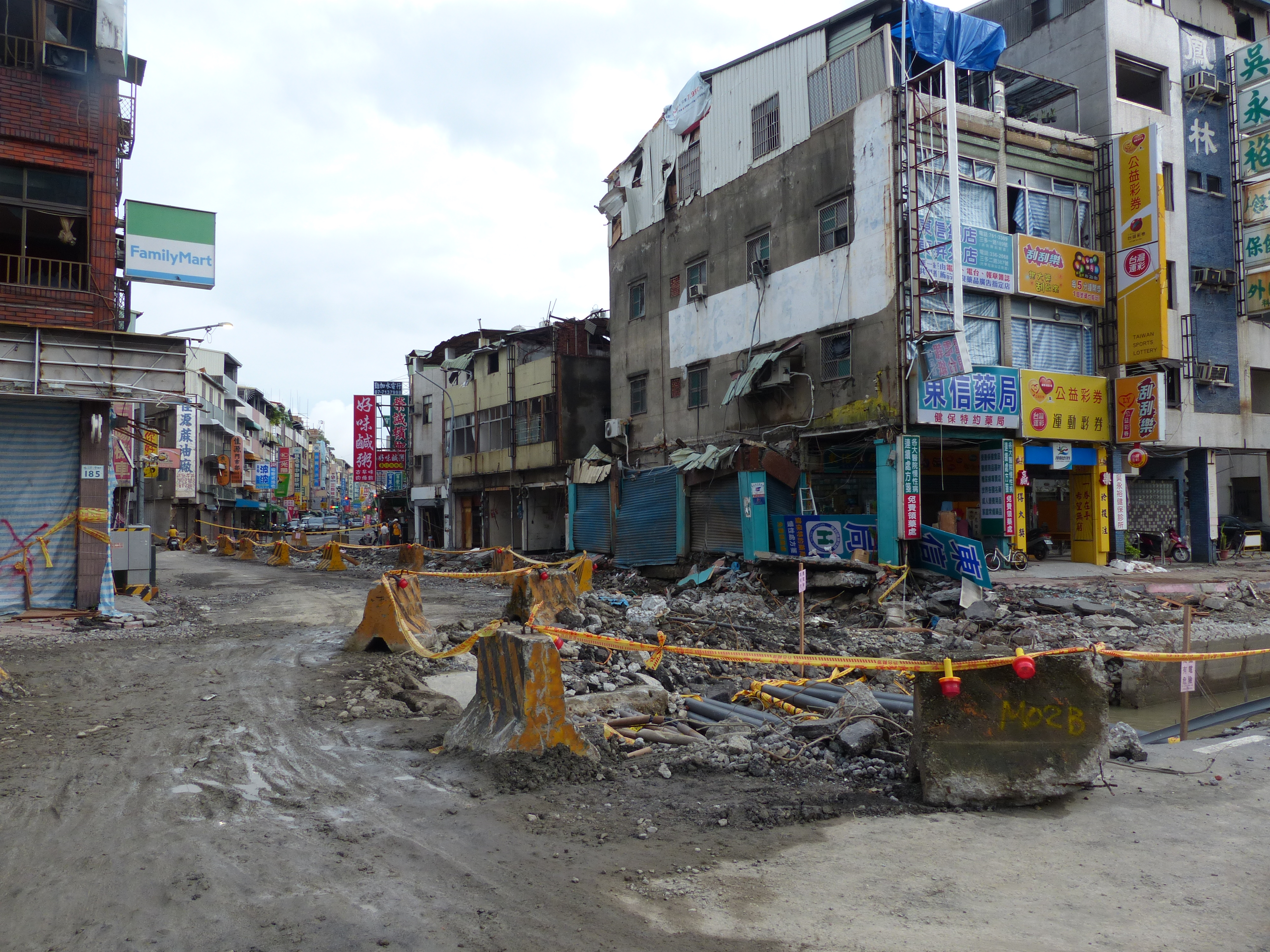
The damaged underground pipes and sewer system created trenches

The Minister of Economic Affairs Chang Chia-juch, acting as the Director of the Central Emergency Operation Center, suspected that the explosions were caused by a propene leak, and the firefighters could not extinguish the fires with water. Emergency workers had to wait until the gas had burnt away after the supply was shut down. It is suspected that the affected pipelines were those used for gas delivery to the petrochemical factory LCY Chemical Corp. (LCY; Chinese: 李長榮化學工業).

The affected pipelines were designed and constructed by the government-owned CPC Corporation. However, CPC said that the pipeline system did not show any sign of problems before the explosion. The gas pipelines were approved in 1990 by Vice President Wu Den-yih, who served as mayor of Kaohsiung from 1990 to 1998, and the construction was completed in 1994. The pipelines had not been properly inspected for 24 years.

The Kaohsiung City Government found out that a 100-millimetre (4 in) pipeline delivering propene to Ren Da Industrial Park was found to encounter abnormal pressure between 20:40 and 21:00 the night the gas leak was discovered.

Pressure in the LCY piping system used to transport propene from one of its suppliers began to show abnormality starting 20:00 Thursday night and 3.77 tons of propene leaked between 20:00 and 21:00 The company did not shut down the pipe until 23:40, 16 minutes before the first gas explosion occurred. The concentration of the propene at the explosion site was abnormally high at 13,000 ppm. In a press conference on Friday, LCY CEO said that the company is fully cooperating with the authorities in the investigation and the company will bear the responsibility if found guilty.

During a press conference on Sunday at the Taiwan Stock Exchange in Taipei, LCY said that it was the responsibility of CPC to design and check the gas pipes. CPC responded that the pipes belonged to LCY and CPC did not have any maintenance contract with them. LCY further explained that detecting pressure drops indicating gas leaks was the responsibility of the China General Terminal and Distribution Corporation (CGTD; Chinese: 華運倉儲), who transport LCY's petrochemicals through the pipes. LCY claimed they first detected abnormalities when the propene supply completely ceased at 8:49 p.m and returned to normal half an hour later. At 22:35, they detected further problems, shutting down transporting immediately. According to Kaohsiung's top environment official, though, 3.77 metric tons of gas had leaked already between 20:00 and 21:00, and the pipe system was only shut down at 23:40 – just 16 minutes before the explosion.

On 5 August, the Kaohsiung District Prosecutors Office (KDPO) retrieved documents and records related to propene transport after they raided LCY and CGTD offices a day before. Several employees were brought to the prosecutors office for questioning. To better investigate the causes of the explosion, KDPO also invited domestic metal and petrochemical experts to the blast areas to collect evidence. On 18 December, the CEO and five employees of LCY Chemical, three employees of China General Terminal and Distribution, and three employees of the Kaohsiung Public Works Bureau were indicted for their role in the incident. The indictment charges these three groups with negligence, due to their failure to inspect or maintain the pipeline.

== Reactions ==
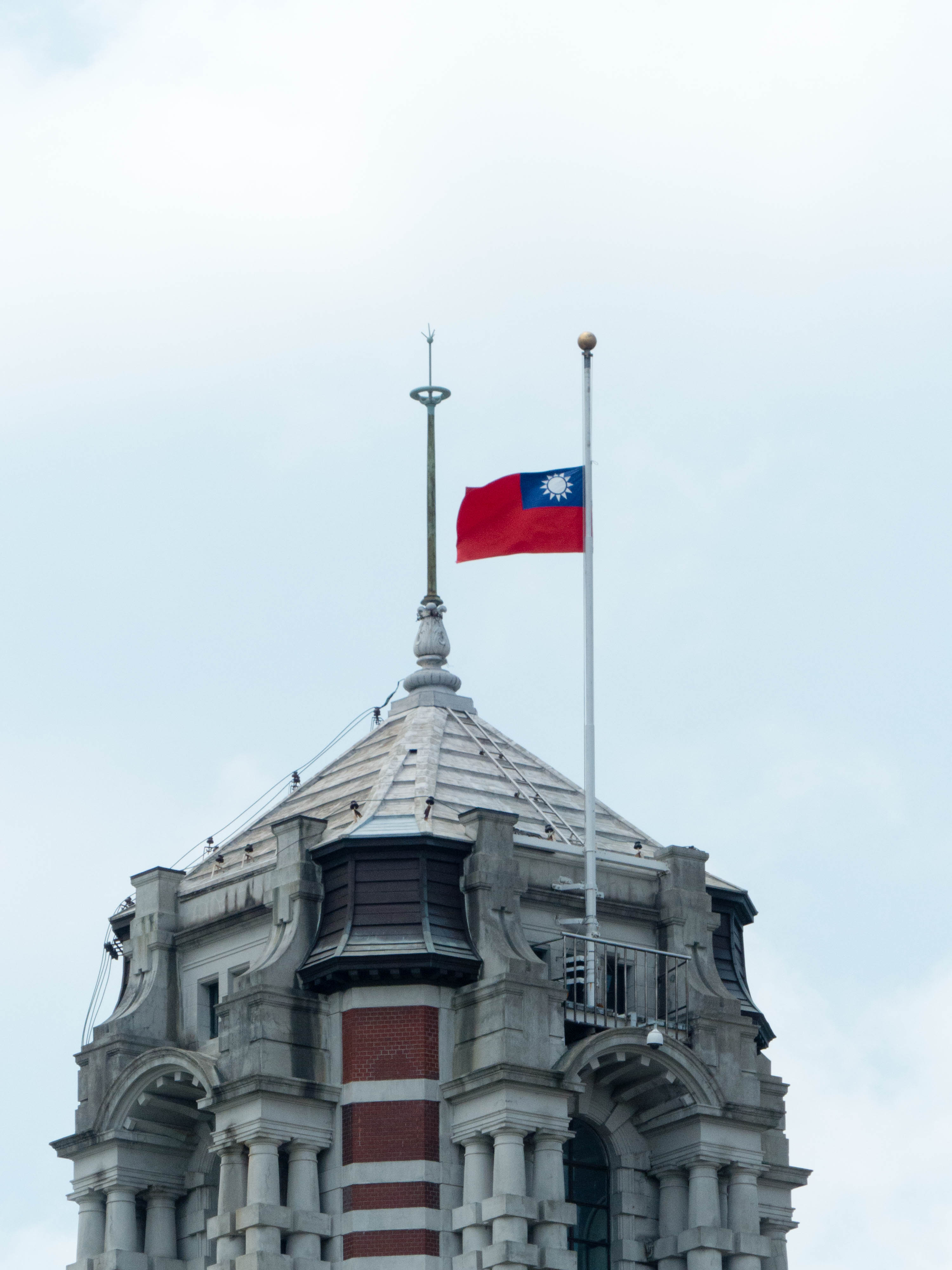
Taiwanese flag flown half-mast at the Presidential Office Building for three days starting on 5 August 2014

=== Domestic ===
President Ma Ying-jeou ordered full rescue efforts to help the blast victims. During his visit to Kaohsiung on Saturday to visit injured patients in hospitals and view the explosion sites, President Ma vowed to fully investigate the cause of the incident and to review the underground piping networks, stressing the need for a more comprehensive design and efficient management.

During his inspection of the damage in Kaohsiung, Premier Jiang Yi-huah, ordered the Taiwanese national flag to be flown at half-mast for three days starting 5 August to commemorate the victims of the gas explosions and also the TransAsia Airways Flight 222 crash a week before in Penghu County.

Vice Premier Mao Chi-kuo said during the rescue and relief effort works that public utilities companies would work hard to resume power and water supplies within three to five days. Taiwan Power Company said that power supply to about 3,900 households in less-affected areas should resume in two days, while temporary overhead lines set up to supply the worst-hit areas were expected to allow electricity to resume in three days. Taiwan Water Corporation said that the city government agreed to temporary water pipelines to supply the affected areas within five days. However, there was no schedule set up to resume the gas supply for the affected areas.

Kaohsiung City Mayor Chen Chu said that schools and offices in the affected districts were closed the day after the explosion to facilitate search and rescue. She ordered gas supply companies CPC Corporation and Hsin Kao Gas to cut off gas delivery along the gas pipelines after the first explosion occurred. Mayor Chen asked President Ma to study and review the underground petrochemical pipeline system in Kaohsiung to avoid similar accidents in the future, which could eventually involve rerouting to avoid densely populated areas. She also asked the central government to help Kaohsiung City Government to replace all of the ageing pipes, many of which have been in operation for a period of 20–30 years, and in some cases for more than 40 years.

The Ministry of National Defense deployed around 1,600 soldiers for the rescue operations, including 131 transport vehicles, 29 ambulances, 3 fire trucks, 3 chemical-detection vehicles, 15 engineering machines and other equipment. The ministry also provided blast victims with free accommodations at military bases.

Mayor Chen's party, Democratic Progressive Party (DPP), suspended all of their upcoming municipal and local election activities scheduled for November after an emergency meeting chaired by Chairperson Tsai Ing-wen. DPP also asked other municipalities and counties led by DPP to help with the rescue efforts in Kaohsiung. The ruling Kuomintang party also suspended all of their upcoming activities.

Several major festivals in Taiwan, such as Qixi Festival and Dadaocheng Fireworks Festival, were cancelled as a result of the incident.

The Financial Supervisory Commission announced on Friday that it had instructed insurance companies to provide expedited insurance claims to all affected individuals and businesses in the area. They also stated that individuals and businesses may apply to the Ministry of Economic Affairs for assistance.

Public reactions towards the government have been largely negative, criticizing what was seen as a slow response by the authorities to stop and isolate the gas leak after it was first reported. In wake of the disaster, many local residents have said that the government should relocate the gas pipes away from their neighborhoods. One resident claimed that he had notified city authorities prior to the explosion when he smelled a gas odor near his apartment. However, authorities told him that the situation was under control and had been declared safe after police and firefighters arrived at the scene. Kaohsiung city authorities responded to these criticisms by saying that had residents been evacuated prior to the explosions, there may have been even more fatalities, since most of the injured or dead were those on the roads at the time of the incidents. According to Taipower, staying indoors was the best precaution that could be taken for people facing such a disaster. The Kuomintang caucus of the Kaohsiung City Council sued Mayor Chen Chu for negligence that led to loss of life. The Democratic Progressive Party caucus responded by filing a lawsuit against former Kaohsiung mayor Wu Den-yih, for "illegitimately" allowing the pipelines to be buried. Wu then publicized documents stating that the pipes were installed before his leadership of Kaohsiung.

=== International ===
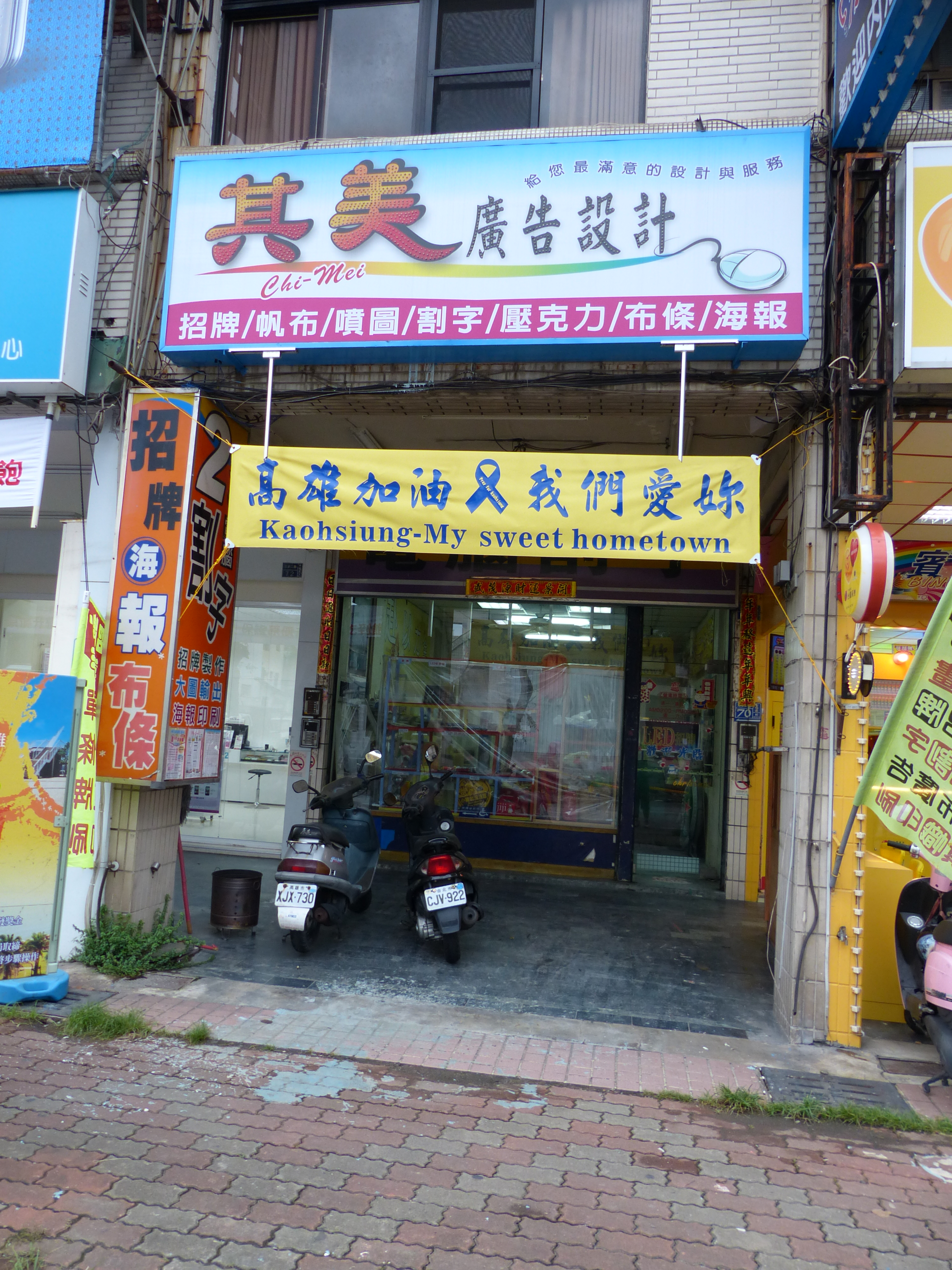
Banner displayed by local residents to show support for Kaohsiung

- China – Xi Jinping, serving as General Secretary of the Chinese Communist Party, conveyed condolences over the Kaohsiung explosions through the Taiwan Affairs Office. Association for Relations Across the Taiwan Straits Chairman Chen Deming called Straits Exchange Foundation Chairman Lin Join-sane to convey sympathy for those affected by the incident and said that China is willing to provide assistance if needed. Lin reportedly had thanked Chen for the help offer but said that Taiwan had put its comprehensive disaster relief system to work and it did not need any outside help at the moment.
- Hong Kong, China – Chief Executive CY Leung expressed sadness on the tragic gas explosion that caused heavy casualties. He made the expression on behalf of the Government of Hong Kong and the people of Hong Kong, People's Republic of China.
- Macau, China – Chief Executive Fernando Chui, on behalf of the Government of Macau and Macau residents, expressed his deep condolences to the victims and their relatives and sincere sympathies to the injured.
- European Union – European Economic and Trade Office expressed its sincere condolences to the families of the explosion victims.
- France – The French Office in Taipei offered its sincere condolences to the families of Kaohsiung gas explosion victims. Their thoughts are with the families and friends of those injured and had lost their lives.
- Japan – Interchange Association, Japan Representative Mikio Numata sent letters of condolence to President Ma Ying-jeou, Minister of Foreign Affairs David Lin and Association of East Asian Relations Chairman Lee Chia-chin.
- Singapore – Singapore Trade Office in Taipei issued a statement extending "deepest condolences".
- United Kingdom – British Trade and Cultural Office was saddened to learn of the gas explosions that caused many loss of lives and injuries.

== Relief efforts ==
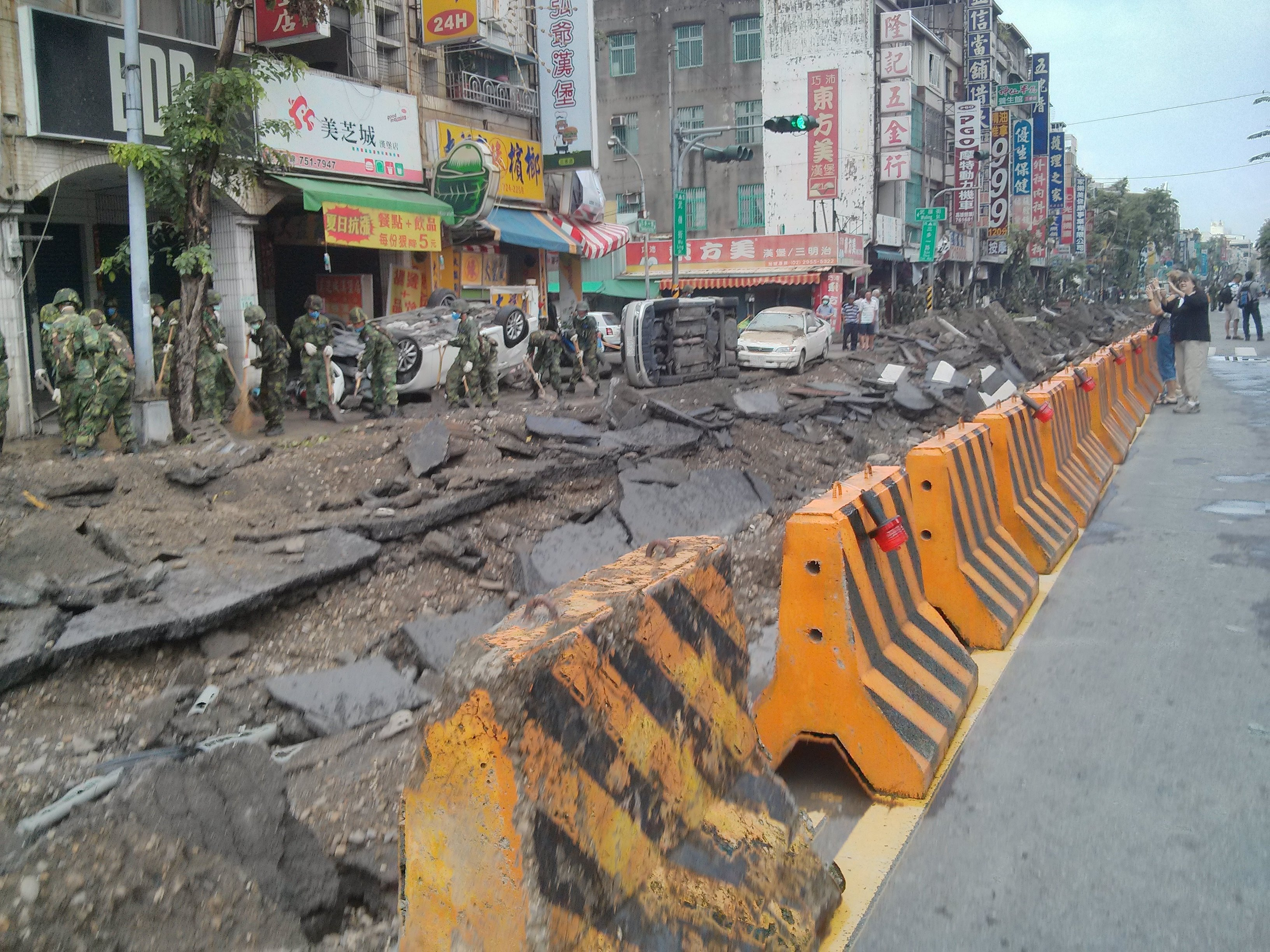
Taiwanese army soldiers during the search and rescue period at Sanduo 1st Road on Friday after the explosion

A total of ten emergency shelters consisting of several schools and a cultural center were used for the 12,000 people who had evacuated overnight. Many people, including high school students, had volunteered to help the post-disaster relief efforts by helping with the relief supplies distribution and offering of other services, such as counseling.

Dozens of hotels around Kaohsiung offered temporary free lodging, laundry and washroom facilities for the people who were left homeless after their houses were damaged by the blast. Restaurants, supermarkets and convenience stores also provided various kinds of supports.

Relief supplies and works, such as food, blanket, sleeping bags, bottled water, injury and emergency assistance, counseling and funeral arrangements, were made possible by the Tzu Chi Foundation, the Kaohsiung Branch of the Taiwanese Red Cross, the Sunshine Social Welfare Foundation and many other foundations. Religious rituals were also held at the blast sites for grieving relatives who had lost their loved ones.

Donations also came from enterprise sectors, such as Formosa Plastics Group, Advanced Semiconductor Engineering, Inc., Foxconn, Kinpo Group, Acer Inc., HTC, E-United Group, Chailease Holding Co., MediaTek, Fubon Financial Holding Co., Capital Bus Company, Taipei Bus Company, Shanghai Commercial Bank, Tripod Technology, RT-Mart, Taiflex and many others. Companies such as FamilyMart, 7-Eleven, Chinese Television Service and Videoland Television Network also organized fund-raising drives and events for the blast victims. Taiwanese businesses operating in Beijing and Shanghai also joined in donating money for the blast victims.

Taipei Mayor Hau Lung-pin offered NT$200,000 to the families of the blast victims. Sean Lien and Ko Wen-je, candidates for Mayor of Taipei in the upcoming municipal elections on 29 November 2014, donated NT$2,000,000 and NT$400,000 respectively. In a joint statement, five leaders from the DPP-controlled counties and municipality pledged to donate one month of their salary to the blast victims, which are Chiayi County Magistrate Helen Chang, Pingtung County Magistrate Tsao Chi-hung, Yilan County Magistrate Lin Tsung-hsien, Yunlin County Magistrate Su Chih-fen and Tainan City Mayor William Lai.

Taiwanese singers such as Kenji Wu, Mayday, and Peter Ho and mainland Chinese singer Ding Dang joined the public in giving donations to support the blast victims, since many of their relatives also live in Kaohsiung.

The Ministry of Culture launched a poetry drive to honor the blast victims posted on the ministry's Facebook page. Culture Minister Lung Ying-tai herself contributed a poem entitled If I Had Known Earlier (Chinese: 如果早知道).

The Ministry of Health and Welfare has been providing services to hold counseling to help residents to go through posttraumatic stress disorder by mobilizing medical personnel and social workers to the affected district areas. The services will be in place for the next two to three months.

Despite the donations and support Kaohsiung had received, many victims complained that they had to wait in line for more than two hours to get them. Some people were also caught on camera pretending that they were the explosion victims or taking turns in group to get the donations several times more than what they were supposed to get.

As of 7 August, a total NT$2.38 billion worth of donations had been received from companies and individuals, with another NT$1.6 billion funds agreed to be provided by the Executive Yuan.

== Restoration works ==
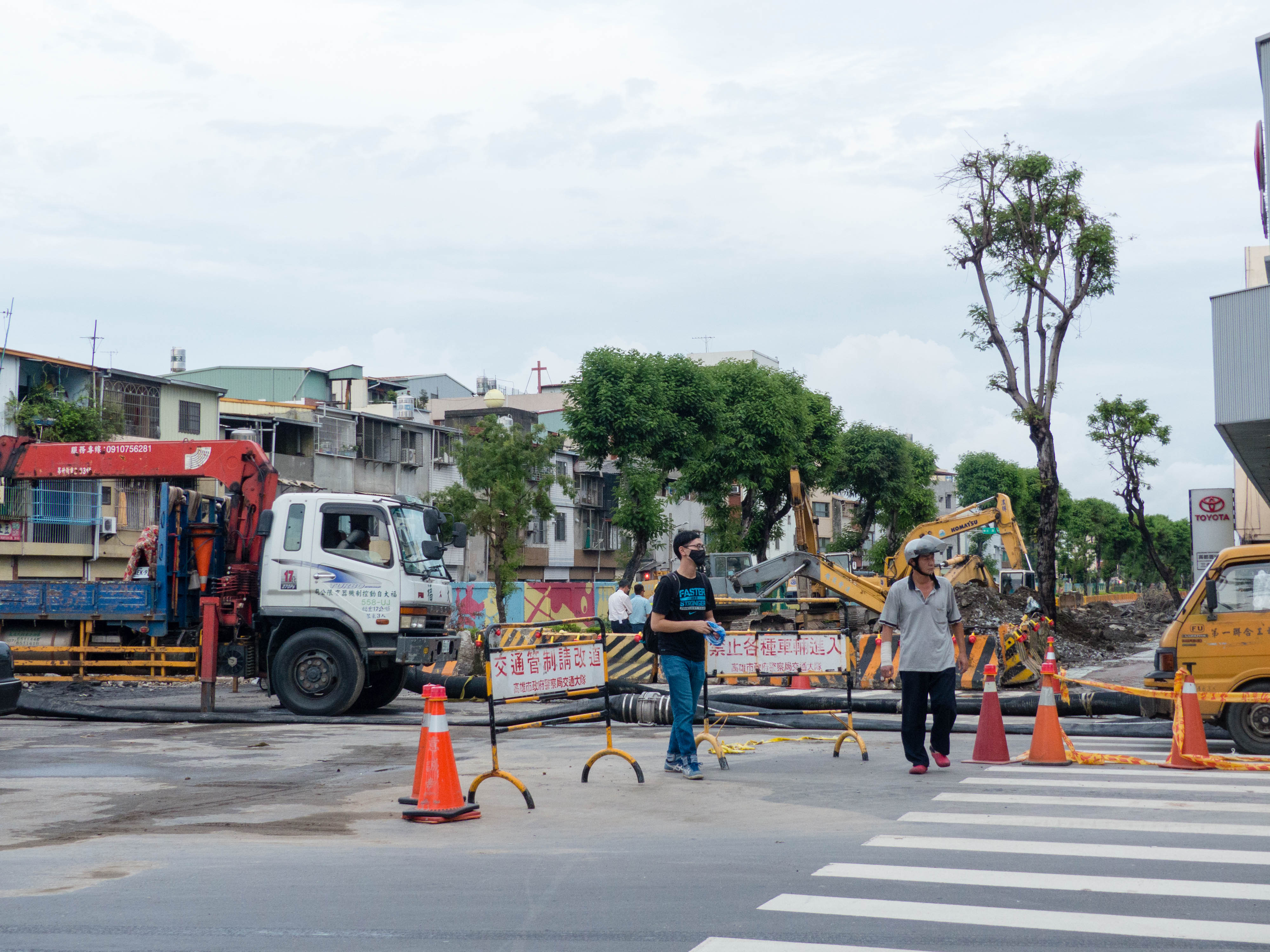
Heavy vehicles mobilized for reconstruction works at Kaisyuan 2nd Road

The initial estimation of the total damage done to Kaohsiung City due to the blast reached around NT$1.9 billion for rebuilding the damaged roads and drainage system. However, the cost may arise higher if the cost to rebuild damaged buildings and to compensate victims are included in order to get their live back on track as soon as possible.

The rebuilding of the 6 km damaged road began on Monday by road resurfacing. Sanduo Road work was done by Maintenance Office of the Kaohsiung City Government, Yisin Road by New Construction Office and Kaisyuan Road by Water Resources Bureau. The restoration works included the repaving of the roads, reparation of the damaged sidewalks and replanting of trees along the road which would cost around NT$600 million. The restoration of the rain water drainage system under the road will take around three months which costs another NT$600 million.

Around 1,500 stores along the damaged roads are affected with the reconstruction work of the roads, which lead the owners to temporarily close their stores due to lack of customers. Some of the business owners at Kaisyuan Road are already looking for relocation than waiting for the roadwork to finish in months. The Economic Development Bureau had received registrations from 1,275 companies so far for compensation related to the disaster. The bureau added that the city government will give tax reductions for the affected stores and will construct temporary paths to allow access to the areas without roadworks, and businesses could also apply for social aid.

In the coming days after the explosions, restoration and reconstruction works had mostly been hampered, delayed or sometimes halted by heavy rain and the excessive flooding around the area due to the rain. Trenches created from the blasts were flooded and water flow was blocked due to the damaged sewage, culverts and drainage system. Water pipes had been utilized to minimize flooding in some areas of the city. Armies and fire fighters also were put on standby ready to be deployed with life rafts whenever needed.

On 20 November 2014, the Sanduo, Kaisyuan and Yishin Roads were finally opened again for traffic after restoration works. In the end of December 2014, in order to revive the economic activities to the affected stores and shops area, the Kaohsiung City Government held lucky draws and other promotional sales to attract consumption at those stores.

== Aftermath ==
=== The petrochemical industry ===
Share prices of several Taiwanese petrochemical companies took a dive in the aftermath of the explosions, especially those operating in Kaohsiung, with LCY shares dropping 30% in the days following the explosion.

Deputy Minister of Economic Affairs Woody Duh said that the ministry would set up a system soon to help check the underground pipelines and build a database for safety management in the future, starting from Kaohsiung and followed by other cities, municipalities and counties. Duh mentioned that relocation of the Kaohsiung underground pipelines would be considered once the roadworks are completed.

Taipei City Government ordered mandatory inspections of all four major gas pipelines in Taipei within a week after reports of gas leakage smell in Zhongshan and Wanhua Districts for five consecutive days. Great Taipei Gas had earlier inspected the site and found no immediate danger, adding that the firm had sealed the leaks and plans to change the pipes. Still at Zhongshan District, the gas company did some maintenance work to the reported gas leak near Songjiang Road. On Friday, Taipei Deputy Mayor Chen Hsiung-wen led an inspection of a gas storage unit in Neihu District and said that underground gas pipelines crossing Taipei City carry low-pressure gas and do not carry any chemical substances. He also added that major gas suppliers are required to inspect all of their pipelines within a week. The city government also later on launched a website for Taipei residents to check what types of underground cables and pipelines running near their houses, ranging from electric lines, telecommunication lines, and pipelines used to transport sanitized water, waste water, rain water, natural gas and oil.

Few days after the blast, Premier Jiang Yi-huah appointed the Ministry of Economic Affairs to gather and sort out Taiwan's entire underground petrochemical pipeline network information and to establish a management system to avoid similar explosions from happening in the future, adding that such a management system would help local governments to determine which petrochemical pipelines need to be relocated and which ones can stay in place.

A People First Party legislator called on the local governments to form agencies that deal with chemical hazards and employ trained professionals to oversee disaster management, and to better educate firefighters on the nature of different chemicals in order to make correct decisions and reduce casualties.

=== Criticism and resignation of government officials ===
On 6 August, Premier Jiang Yi-huah and Economic Affairs Minister Chang Chia-juch came under fire and were asked to step down by demonstrators after Jiang's "Three Noes" remarks on 4 August stating that there were no need for a special provision bill, financial assistance through special budget allocation, and a dedicated agency to administer post disaster relief and reconstruction for Kaohsiung. Also on the same day, residents and DPP councilors of Kaohsiung City Council went to Taiwan Kaohsiung District Court to protest against LCY in an attempt to prevent the company from avoiding compensation payments over the gas blasts. Mayor Chen said that Kaohsiung City Government had frozen firm assets and properties worth around NT$1.9 billion as a precautionary measure.

On 7 August, in order to take the responsibility for the blast, Kaohsiung City Deputy Mayor Wu Hong-mo, Water Resources Bureau Director Lee Hsien-yi, Public Works Bureau Director Chen Tsun-yung and Kaohsiung Mass Rapid Transit Bureau Director Chen Tsun-yung tendered their resignation, a move which Mayor Chen praised and that she approved and stated that the resignation would take effect after the relief works ended.

In the evening, the Ministry of Economic Affairs issued a statement saying that Minister Chang Chia-juch and Deputy Minister Woody Duh had also tendered his resignation earlier at 10 a.m. to the Executive Yuan due to the difficult political environment as a result of persistent boycott by opposition parties over several economic policies in the past 1.5 years. Despite Premier Jiang Yi-huah efforts to persuade Chang to stay in his ministerial position, the Executive Yuan finally approved his resignation on 10 August and appointed Deputy Minister Woody Duh to replace Chang.

=== Memorial services ===
Funerals for the deceased was held on the same day at Kaohsiung municipal mortuary, attended by Vice Premier Mao Chi-kuo, Kaohsiung Mayor Chen Chu, Minister without Portfolio Yang Chiu-hsing, DPP Chairperson Tsai Ing-wen and also LCY Chairman Bowei Lee. Lee bowed his head to apologize to the families of the blast victims, promising them that the company would provide good financial compensation to them.

On 12 August, a national religious service was held in Kaohsiung Arena, bringing together around 10,000 people from 30 local religious groups covering Buddhism, Christianity, Islam and Taoism. President Ma Ying-jeou, who also attended the event, commended the soldiers and firefighters who risked their lives in saving life of the people. He reassured the audience that the government would provide the necessary assistance to help Kaohsiung residence back to their normal life as soon as possible. He also expressed his gratitude to the business and volunteers who had made generous contributions to the relief and reconstruction efforts after the blast disaster.

== See also ==
- 1992 Guadalajara explosions
- 2010 San Bruno pipeline explosion
