= Robert L. McFadden =

American politician

Member of the South Carolina House of Representatives for York County
- In office 1961–1980

Personal details
- Born: August 25, 1929 Camden, South Carolina
- Died: November 18, 2010 (aged 81) Rock Hill, South Carolina
- Party: Democratic
- Occupation: lawyer

Robert Lawrence McFadden (August 25, 1929 – November 18, 2010) was an American politician in the state of South Carolina. He served in the South Carolina House of Representatives as a member of the Democratic Party from 1961 to 1980, representing York County, South Carolina. He is a lawyer. He died in 2010.
