= John Machacek =

American journalist (1940–2020)

John Machacek (February 18, 1940 – July 24, 2020) was an American reporter.

Machacek was born in Cedar Rapids, Iowa. Working for The Times-Union of Rochester, New York, in 1971, he and Richard Cooper covered the Attica Prison riot. Their reporting was recognized with the 1972 Pulitzer Prize for Spot Reporting.
