= Taiwan Water Corporation =

Taiwanese water utility company

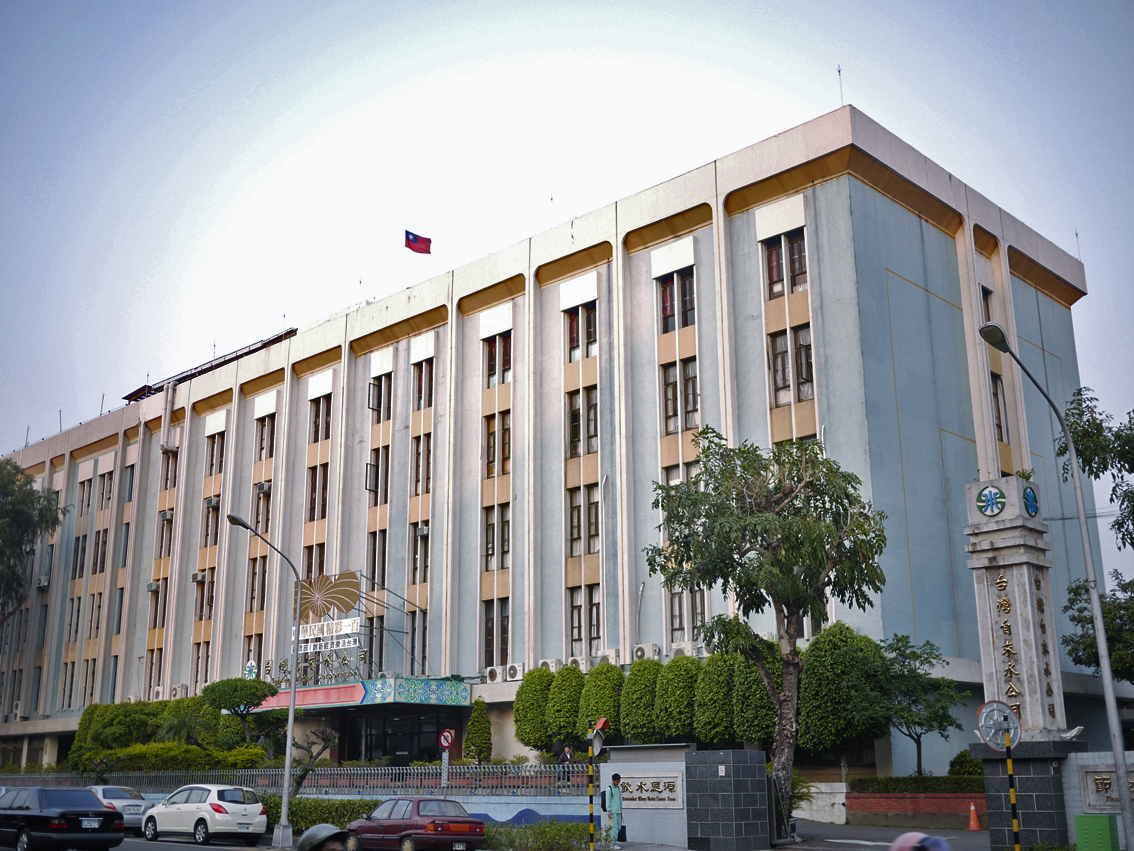
- Native name: 台灣自來水公司
- Industry: water supply
- Founded: 1974
- Headquarters: North, Taichung, Taiwan
- Key people: Li Jia-rong (Chairperson); Lee Tin-Lai (President)
- Parent: Ministry of Economic Affairs
- Website: Official website

The Taiwan Water Corporation (TWC; traditional Chinese: 台灣自來水公司; simplified Chinese: 台湾自来水公司; pinyin: Táiwān Zìláishuǐ Gōngsī) is a state-owned water utility providing water supply to most of Taiwan and offshore islands. The company is headquartered in North District, Taichung.

== History ==
On 16 December 1972, President Chiang Ching-kuo instructed that a water corporation be set up to develop and unified public water supply system island-wide. On 1 April 1973, the preparatory office for Taiwan Water Corporation was set up by Taiwan Provincial Government. Taiwan Water Corporation was then inaugurated by the provincial government in 1974.

Former chairman Hsu Hsiang-kun was arrested on bribery and corruption charges in September 2007, and indicted in August 2014. Hsu had contracted Kintech Technology Company to expand two water purification facilities in 2002. The project deadline was extended twice to November 2003 and March 2005. Hsu then accepted NT$5 million to grant Kintech a third extension to September 2007, by which time the project was completed.

== Organizational structure ==
- Department of Planning
- Department of Public Works
- Department of Water Supply
- Department of Business
- Department of Finance
- Department of Materials
- Department of Water Quality
- Department of Industrial Safety and Environment Protection
- Department of Information Management
- Department of General Affairs
- Department of Accounting
- Department of Human Resources
- Department of Civil Service Ethics
- Water Loss Management Center
- Bidding Center

== Branch offices ==
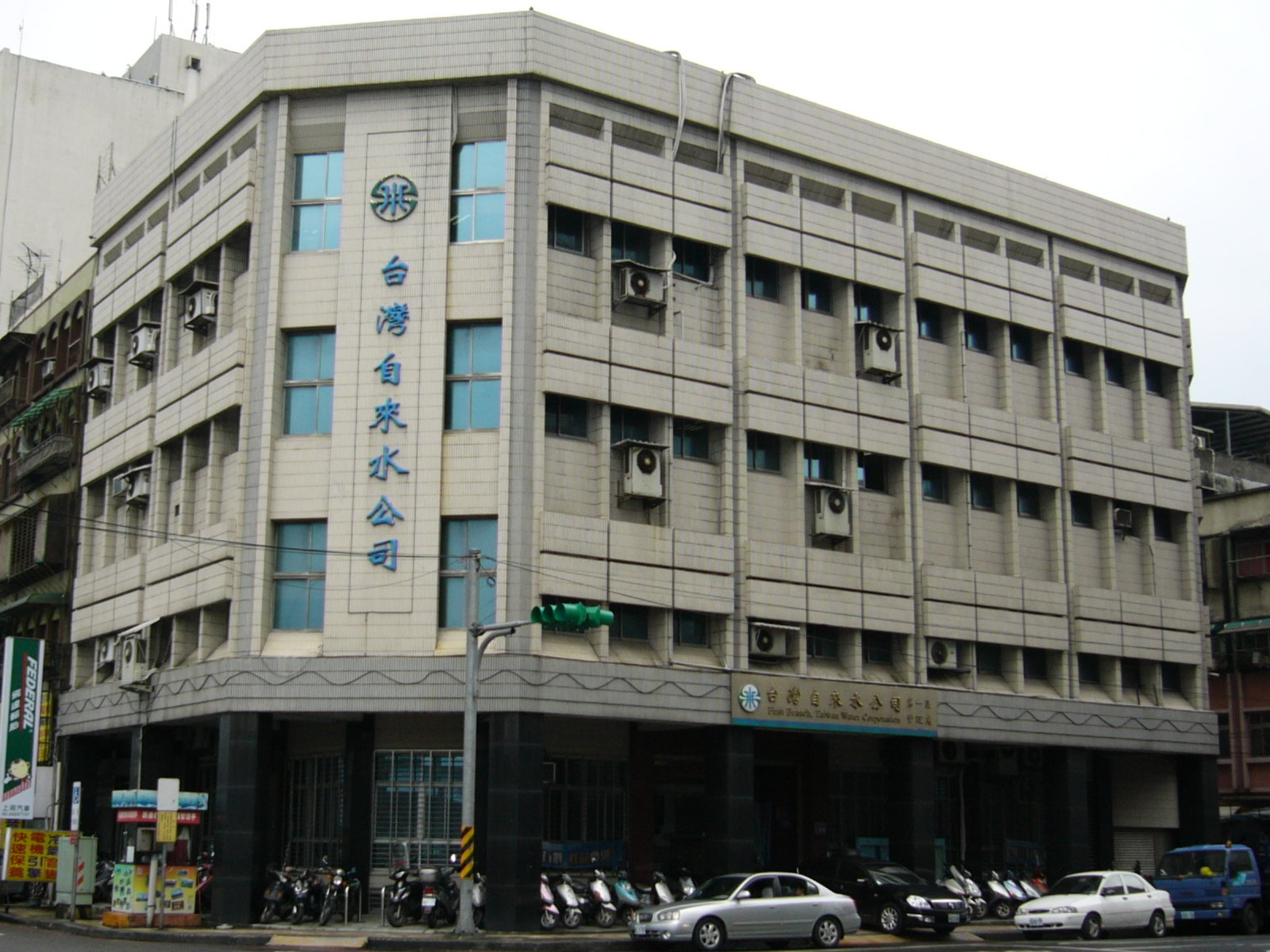
TWC Keelung service center.

- 1st Branch: Keelung City
- 2nd Branch: Taoyuan City
- 3rd Branch: Hsinchu County and Miaoli County
- 4th Branch: Taichung City and Nantou County
- 5th Branch: Yunlin County and Chiayi County
- 6th Branch: Tainan City
- 7th Branch: Kaohsiung City and Penghu County
- 8th Branch: Yilan County
- 9th Branch: Hualien County
- 10th Branch: Taitung County
- 11th Branch: Changhua County
- 12th Branch: New Taipei City
- Pingtung Branch: Pingtung County

== See also ==
- Water supply and sanitation in Taiwan
- Water pollution
- Water security
- Energy in Taiwan
- List of companies of Taiwan
