= Sarah Kaufman (disambiguation) =

Sarah Kaufman (born 1985) is a bantamweight mixed martial artist.

Sarah Kaufman may also refer to:

- Sarah Kaufman (critic) (born 1963), author and dance critic
- Sarah Kaufman, Vocativ reporter and winner of a 2015 Front Page Award
- Sarah Kaufman, soccer midfielder for the Fort Wayne Fever in 2009
