= Let's Take the Long Way Home =

2010 memoir by Gail Caldwell

Let's Take the Long Way Home: a memoir of friendship
- First edition cover
- Author: Gail Caldwell (1951-)
- Language: English
- Publisher: Random House
- Publication date: 10 August 2010
- Publication place: United States
- Pages: 208 pp
- ISBN: 978-1-4000-6738-1
- OCLC: 660156384
- Dewey Decimal: 920/.72 C147L
- LC Class: PN4874.K575 C35 2010

Let's Take the Long Way Home: a memoir of friendship is a memoir by Gail Caldwell (1951–). The memoir describes the friendship between the author and fellow writer Caroline Knapp who died at the age of 42 in 2002, and it takes place in Cambridge, Massachusetts. Let's Take the Long Way Home was published in 2010. The title refers to their habit of taking the long way home so that they could continue their conversations.

== Plot summary ==
The book opens "It's an old, old story: I had a friend and we shared everything, and then she died and so we shared that too.” The connection between these women was charged from the beginning. They were introduced by a dog walker who recognized their many similarities and they began "walking their puppies" together in the woods. "Apart, we had each been frightened drunks and single women and dog lovers; together, we became a small corporation. Finding Caroline was like placing a personal ad for an imaginary friend, then having her show up at your door funnier and better than you could have conceived." The growth of their friendship, the strength of their bond, the tragedy of Caroline's short fight against lung cancer and the grief beyond are all detailed.

== Awards and recognition ==
Let's Take the Long Way Home: a memoir of friendship won the New England Book Award in 2010. It was named one of the top ten non-fiction books of 2010 by Time magazine, The Washington Post, O: The Oprah Magazine, and many others. Time magazine states that it is "[h]eartbreaking but never maudlin" and "a testament to the power and beauty of mature friendship." Gail Caldwell won the Pulitzer Prize for Criticism in 2001 for her writing at the Boston Globe.

== Reviews ==
- 'Soul Deep' by Julie Myerson The New York Times Sunday Book Review August 20, 2010
- Gail Caldwell memoir, 'Let's Take the Long Way Home,' reviewed by Heller McAlpin in The Washington Post.
- "Let's Take the Long Way Home" by Laura Miller, Salon.com August 1, 2010
