= Donal Henahan =

American journalist (1921–2012)

- Born: February 28, 1921; Cleveland, Ohio, U.S.
- Died: August 19, 2012 (aged 91)
- Education: Kent State University; Ohio University; Northwestern University (BA); University of Chicago; Roosevelt University; Columbia University; Yale University (MA)
- Occupations: Music critic, journalist

Donal Henahan (February 28, 1921 – August 19, 2012) was an American music critic and journalist who had lengthy associations with the Chicago Daily News and The New York Times. With the Times he won the annual Pulitzer Prize for Criticism in 1986; he had been a finalist in 1982.

== Life and career ==
Born in Cleveland, Ohio, Henahan initially studied at Kent State University and Ohio University, but his education was interrupted by military service during World War II. As a fighter pilot in the United States Army Air Forces from 1942 to 1945, he attained the rank of first lieutenant and was awarded the Air Medal with four oak leaf clusters. After the war, he entered Northwestern University, where he received his undergraduate degree in 1948. In 1949, he entered the University of Chicago to pursue graduate studies, and from 1951 to 1958 he studied piano, singing, and classical guitar at the Chicago School of Music at Roosevelt University. He later pursued graduate studies in music at Columbia University and Yale University, ultimately earning a master's degree from the latter institution.

While a student at Northwestern, Henahan joined the news staff of the Chicago Daily News in 1947. He remained with that paper for the next two decades, notably becoming chief music critic of the Daily News in 1957. He concurrently contributed articles as a freelance writer to numerous periodicals, including Esquire, Harper's Bazaar, High Fidelity, Musical Quarterly, Saturday Review, Stereo Review and The Saturday Evening Post.

In 1967, Henahan left the Chicago Daily News to join the music criticism staff at The New York Times. He became chief music critic of The Times in 1980 and was awarded the Pulitzer Prize for Criticism in 1986. He remained chief music critic at The Times until his retirement in 1991 when he was succeeded by critic Edward Rothstein. After his retirement, he periodically contributed articles to The Times through 1997 as a freelance writer.

Henahan died, aged 91, on August 19, 2012, at his Manhattan home.
