= Mary McNamara =

American journalist

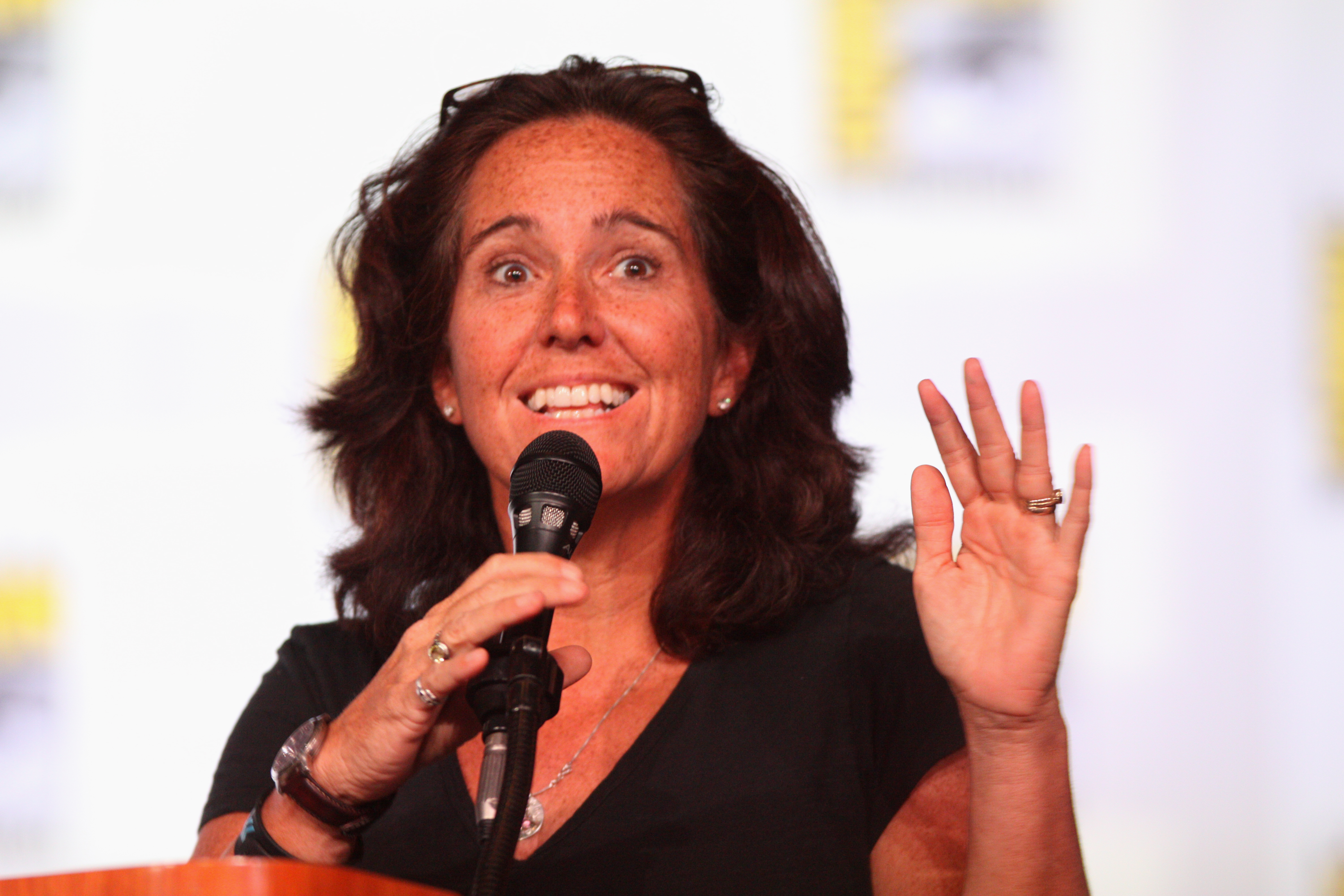
- McNamara at the 2012 San Diego Comic-Con
- Born: 1963 (age 61–62)
- Education: University of Missouri (BA)

Mary McNamara (born 1963) is an American journalist and television critic for the Los Angeles Times. She won the 2015 Pulitzer Prize for Criticism.

== Biography ==
McNamara moved from Baltimore to Westminster in elementary school. She graduated from Westminster Senior High School and attended the University of Missouri School of Journalism. While at Missouri, she reported for the Columbia Missourian. Upon her graduation, McNamara wrote for Ms. Magazine, then worked for Whittle Communications. McNamara joined the Los Angeles Times in 1991 as a features writer and editor. In 2009, she became the Times' television critic.
