= Mark Lamster =

American architecture writer and critic

Mark Lamster (born in New York City) is an American architecture writer and critic. He has been the architecture critic of The Dallas Morning News since moving to Dallas in 2013.

== Early career ==
Lamster holds a BA from Johns Hopkins University and an MA from Tufts University. He began his career as an editor at George Braziller, an independent publisher of literature and illustrated books. He then spent more than a decade as a senior editor at Princeton Architectural Press in New York. He was a contributing editor to Architectural Review, Design Observer and ID. His writing also appeared in The New York Times, the Los Angeles Times and The Wall Street Journal.

His first book, Spalding's World Tour, was an Editor's Choice selection of The New York Times Book Review. It tells the story of Albert Spalding's 1888–89 world tour of baseball players. The book's research materials are held by the National Baseball Hall of Fame as the Mark Lamster Papers. His second book, Master of Shadows (Nan A. Talese/Doubleday, 2009), is a political biography of Peter Paul Rubens focused on the painter's work as a diplomat and spy.

== Dallas ==
In addition to his post at the Morning News, Lamster taught at the architecture school of the University of Texas at Arlington.

In 2018 he wrote a biography, The Man in the Glass House: Philip Johnson, Architect of the Modern Century (Little, Brown), showing the Nazi past of Philip Johnson.

In 2026, he was awarded the Pulitzer Prize for Criticism for a series of articles on the proposed tear-down of Dallas City Hall.

Later that year Lamster published Welcome to Paradox City: A Critical History of Dallas as Told Through Its Architecture with Deep Vellum Publishing The book traces the city's history through its buildings. It argues that the city's habit of demolishing its own past is driven by developers and other powerful interests that have been able to direct government power to their own ends. Lamster is critical of Dallas's long orientation toward the automobile. He praises I. M. Pei's City Hall and Klyde Warren Park as works that show the city at its best.
