= Frank Peters Jr. =

American journalist

Frank Peters Jr.

Frank Lewis Peters Jr. (October 19, 1930 – September 14, 2007) was an American journalist. He won the 1972 Pulitzer Prize for Criticism.

== Biography ==
Peters was born in Springfield, Missouri, to Frank Lewis Peters Sr. and Mary Frissel. He graduated from Drury College in 1951 with a Bachelor of Arts degree in English. He spent the next two years in the Army (1951–1953), before attending graduate school at Iowa State University. Frank returned to his hometown in 1954 to serve the local radio stations KWTO (AM) and KGBX-FM as news writer and editor. He left Springfield for the Arkansas Gazette in 1957, and returned for the second time to join the Springfield Leader & Press in 1959. In 1962, Peters was named the managing editor of the Rome Daily American. After two years, Peters left Italy to work for the St. Louis Post Dispatch. He was named the publication's music critic in 1967 and became the arts editor in 1984, holding the position until his retirement in 1988. Peters died of a heart attack at St. Anthony's Medical Center in St. Louis on September 17, 2007. He was 76.

Peters was married to Alba Manciani, with whom he had two children.
