= Dixon Donnelley =

United States Assistant Secretary of State for Public Affairs

11th Assistant Secretary of State for Public Affairs
- In office March 22, 1966 – January 23, 1969
- Preceded by: James L. Greenfield
- Succeeded by: Michael Collins

Personal details
- Born: July 29, 1915 Forest Hills, New York, U.S.
- Died: January 1982 (aged 66)
- Education: Columbia University

Dixon Donnelley (July 29, 1915 – January 1982) was United States Assistant Secretary of State for Public Affairs from 1966 to 1969.

== Biography ==
Donnelley was born in Forest Hills, New York on July 29, 1915. He was a student at Columbia University from 1934 to 1937. During the 1936-37 academic year, he also worked as a junior reporter for the New York Daily News.

In 1937, Donnelley moved to Havana becoming city editor of the Havana Post. He returned to the U.S. in 1941 as assistant city editor of The Washington Daily News. In 1942, he worked as news editor in the Office of the Coordinator of Inter-American Affairs.

After the war, Donnelley spent 1946-47 as press attaché at the United States Embassy in Mexico City. From 1947 to 1948, he was assistant public affairs officer at the U.S. embassy in Santiago, Chile, and was then press attaché at the U.S. embassy in Buenos Aires 1948-49. In 1950, he moved to Washington, D.C. to become an information officer at the United States Department of State focused on the Americas area.

During the 1956 Democratic presidential primaries, Donnelley was the press secretary for Sen. Estes Kefauver (D—TN) to become president of the United States, with Kefauver losing the primaries to Adlai Stevenson.

From 1958 to 1961, Donnelley served as Special Assistant to the Under Secretary of State (Christian Herter and later C. Douglas Dillon). When C. Douglas Dillon was named United States Secretary of the Treasury, Donnelley remained Dillon's assistant, moving with his boss to the United States Department of the Treasury.

In 1966, President Lyndon Johnson nominated Donnelley as Assistant Secretary of State for Public Affairs and Donnelley held this office from March 22, 1966 until January 31, 1969. As such, he was the spokesman of the United States Department of State at the height of the Vietnam War. In September of 1966, in response the use of Agent Orange as a defoliant, from Dixon Donnelley, the Assistant Secretary of State for Public Affairs, which read: “Chemical herbicides are being used in Vietnam to clear jungle growth and to reduce the hazards of ambush by Viet Cong forces. The chemicals are used extensively in most countries by both the Free World and the Communist Bloc for selective control of undesirable vegetation. They are not harmful to people, animals, soil or water.”

Government offices
Preceded by James L. Greenfield	Assistant Secretary of State for Public Affairs; March 22, 1966 – January 31, 1969	Succeeded by Michael Collins
