= Manuela Hoelterhoff =

German-born American cultural journalist (1949–2026)

- Born: April 6, 1949; Hamburg, Germany
- Died: May 6, 2026 (aged 77); New York City, U.S.
- Education: Hofstra University (BA); New York University (MA)
- Occupation: Cultural journalist
- Writing career
- Notable awards: Pulitzer Prize for Criticism (1983)

Manuela Vali Hoelterhoff (April 6, 1949 – May 6, 2026) was a German-born American cultural journalist, who was the executive editor of Muse, the arts and culture section of Bloomberg News until 2015. In 1983 she received a Pulitzer Prize for Criticism.

== Background ==
Manuela V. Hoelterhoff was born April 6, 1949, in Hamburg, Germany, to a Latvian mother, Olga Christina Alexandrovna Goertz, a native of Riga, and a German father, Heinz Alfons Martin Hoelterhoff.

She immigrated to the United States with her parents in 1957. Hoelterhoff held a bachelor's degree from Hofstra University, and a master's degree from the Institute of Fine Arts of New York University. She died of esophageal cancer in New York City, on May 7, 2026, at the age of 77.

== Career ==
Hoelterhoff was a commentator and editor whose topics ranged widely over the contemporary world to include opera and theater, art and architecture, literature and travel, and how animals affect our lives. Her first articles appeared in William F. Buckley's National Review. There followed a twenty-year stint at The Wall Street Journal, where she wrote reviews and served as arts editor, books editor, and member of the editorial board. In this period, she was also a founding editor of SmartMoney magazine, and worked with Harold Evans on creating Conde Nast Traveler.

Hoelterhoff won the annual Pulitzer Prize for Criticism for her 1983 work with The Wall Street Journal, citing "her wide-ranging criticism on the arts and other subjects".

In 1998, Alfred A. Knopf published her Cinderella & Company: Backstage at the Opera with Cecilia Bartoli, which was widely reviewed. It was translated into French, German, and Dutch. The book received positive reviews.

In 2000, she was named a Guggenheim Fellow to research Hitler's opera obsessions.

In 2004, Hoelterhoff was hired by Matt Winkler to create a cultural section for Bloomberg News, the company's financial news service. Muse publishes daily on all the arts – from the visual and performing arts to the literary and culinary, plus movies, TV, the art market, cars, gadgets, the environment, travel, and animals.

Her book project at the time of her death was titled “We Called It Hitler Weather: The Fuhrer From Dawn to Dusk."

Further, at the time of her death she was publishing daily to a blog called Daisy Mae at Her Interspecies Cafe, created with Mike Di Paola. The blog, devoted to animals in a time of change, posted more than 500 entries.
