= Robert Manning (journalist) =

American journalist (1919–2012)

Robert J. Manning
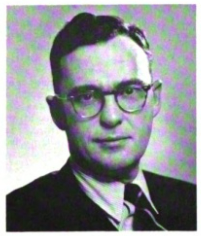

9th Assistant Secretary of State for Public Affairs
- In office April 11, 1962 – July 31, 1964
- President: John F. Kennedy
- Preceded by: Roger Tubby
- Succeeded by: James L. Greenfield

Personal details
- Born: Robert Joseph Manning; December 25, 1919 Binghamton, New York, U.S.
- Died: September 28, 2012 (aged 92)

Robert Joseph Manning (December 25, 1919 – September 28, 2012) was an American journalist. He worked as London Bureau Chief for Time from 1958 to 1961, Assistant Secretary of State for Public Affairs and editor of The Atlantic.

== Works ==
Manning published an autobiography in 1992 entitled The Swamp Root Chronicle: Adventures in the Word Trade.

== Career ==
Manning worked as the Sunday editor of The New York Herald Tribune and in 1966 became the 10th editor in chief of The Atlantic.

His work at The Atlantic landed him on the master list of Nixon political opponents.

== Organizations ==
Manning was a member of the American Academy of Arts and Sciences.

He was also a member of the following clubs:

- Tavern
- St. Botolph (President from 1988 to 1990)
- Century Association

== Family ==
Manning was married to Margaret Manning, who died in 1984. Margaret was the book editor for The Boston Globe. In 1987, Manning married Theresa M. Slomkowski. He had three sons, Richard, Brian, and Robert, along with four grandchildren.

Government offices
Preceded by Roger Tubby	Assistant Secretary of State for Public Affairs; April 11, 1962 – July 31, 1964	Succeeded by James L. Greenfield
