= Margaret Manning =

American journalist (died 1984)

Margaret Manning (died 1984) was an American journalist and book reviewer. She was book editor of the Boston Globe the final ten years of her life, and twice a finalist for the Pulitzer Prize for Criticism.

Manning was born in Omaha, Nebraska and grew up Illinois. In 1943 she graduated with honors from Vassar College. Prior to beginning work as a reviewer at the Globe in the 1960s, she did some writing for United Press and the Chicago Tribune.

She was married to Robert J. Manning.
