= Michael Skube =

Communications professor and former journalist

- Education: Louisiana State University (BA)
- Occupation: Journalist

Michael Skube is a former journalist who is on the faculty of the Elon University School of Communications.

Skube received a Bachelor of Arts from Louisiana State University. In 1975 he began working as a freelance journalist after having worked at the Customs Service. He began writing editorials for the Raleigh News & Observer in 1982 and became a book critic for the paper in 1986. In 1989 he won the Pulitzer Prize for Criticism and the American Society of News Editors Award for Distinguished Commentary. In the mid-1990s he moved to the Atlanta Journal-Constitution, where he was a book reviewer and columnist. While there, he also wrote a regular beer column that won the James Beard Foundation Journalism Award for newspaper writing on spirits, wine and beer in 2000. He left the paper in October 2000 and joined the faculty of the Elon University School of Communications in 2002, where he is now an associate professor.
