= Henry Allen (journalist) =

American journalist

- Born: 1941 (age 84–85); Summit, New Jersey, U.S.
- Education: Hamilton College; Montgomery College
- Occupations: Journalist, Critic, Artist, Poet
- Years active: 1970-present
- Notable credit: The Washington Post (1970–2009)
- Spouse: Deborah
- Awards: American Academy of Poets prize Pulitzer Prize, 2000
- Website: henryallenstudio.blogspot.com

Henry Southworth Allen (born 1941 in Summit, New Jersey) is an American Pulitzer Prize-winning critic, journalist, poet, and artist.

== Biography ==
=== Education ===
Allen obtained his degree in English and art at Hamilton College and Montgomery College.

=== Career ===
Allen began his painting and drawing in the late 1960s.

He was a stationed in Vietnam in the mid-1960s as a U.S. Marine.

Allen was a critic for The New York Review of Books and worked on staff for the New Haven Register. As a staff writer for the Style section, he worked at The Washington Post for 39 years. In 1975, he was awarded a NEH Journalism Fellowship at the University of Michigan. He left The Washington Post in 2009 after an altercation with a fellow staffer (although he had already announced his resignation and was planning on leaving a few weeks later).

Allen then began teaching courses in cultural analysis in the University of Maryland honors program.

Allen had solo shows in June 2009 at the Mansion at Strathmore (Maryland) and in August 2012 at the Chebeague Island Library.

== Awards and honors ==
Allen was awarded the Pulitzer Prize for Criticism in 2000 for his writings in The Washington Post on photography.

== Appearances ==
He appeared on the Colbert Report, February 2, 2010.

== Bibliography ==
- Fool's Mercy (Houghton Mifflin, 1984) ISBN 978-0395320396 — thriller novel
- Going Too Far Enough: American Culture at Century's End (Smithsonian, 1994) ISBN 978-1560983675— collection of Washington Post columns
- The Museum of Lost Air: Poems (Dryad Press, 1998)
- What It Felt Like: Living in the American Century (Pantheon Books, October 2000) ISBN 978-0375420634
- Where We Lived: Essays on Places (Mandel Vilar Press, 2017) ISBN 978-1942134442
