= Ron Powers =

American journalist and writer (born 1941)

- Born: November 18, 1941 (age 84); Hannibal, Missouri, United States
- Occupations: Journalist, novelist and non-fiction writer
- Awards: Pulitzer Prize for Criticism (1973); Emmy Award (1985)

Ron Powers (born November 18, 1941) is an American journalist, novelist, and non-fiction writer. His works include No One Cares About Crazy People: My Family and the Heartbreak of Mental Illness in America; White Town Drowsing: Journeys to Hannibal; Dangerous Water: A Biography of the Boy Who Became Mark Twain, and Mark Twain: A Life, a finalist for the National Book Critics Circle Award. With James Bradley, Powers co-wrote the 2000 number-one New York Times Bestseller Flags of Our Fathers. The book won the Colby Award the following year. It was made into a film in 2006, produced by Steven Spielberg and directed by Clint Eastwood. Powers co-wrote with Ted Kennedy his memoir, True Compass in 2009.

No One Cares About Crazy People was a finalist for the PEN/E. O. Wilson Literary Science Writing Award. The Washington Post named it a Notable Book of the Year, and People named it a Top Ten Book of the Year.

As TV and radio columnist for the Chicago Sun-Times, Powers won the Pulitzer Prize for Criticism in 1973 for his critical writing about television during 1972. He was the first television critic to win the Pulitzer Prize.

In 1985, Powers won an Emmy Award for his work on CBS News Sunday Morning. In 1993 he completed a biography of Muppets creator Jim Henson that was scheduled to be published in October 1994, but after objections from the Henson family Random House declined to release it.

== Personal life ==
Powers was born in 1941 in Hannibal, Missouri, the hometown of Mark Twain. Hannibal was influential in much of Powers' writing—as the subject of his book White Town Drowsing, as the location of the two true-life murders that are the subject of Tom and Huck Don't Live Here Anymore, and as the home of Mark Twain. Powers has said that his fascination with Twain— the subject of two of his books—began in childhood:

"When I was a little boy in Hannibal, he was a mystic figure to me. His pictures and books and images were all over (my friend) Dulany Winkler's house, and I spent a lot of time there. I just wanted to reach out and touch him. Eventually I was able to."

In 2017, Powers published No One Cares About Crazy People, chronicling his sons' schizophrenia, and the family's experience of dealing with the American mental health system.

In addition to writing, Powers has taught nonfiction for the Bread Loaf Writers' Conference, the Salzburg Seminar in Salzburg, Austria, and at Middlebury College in Middlebury, Vermont.

Powers was married to Honoree Fleming, Ph.D., and is father to two sons, one of whom died in 2005. Dr. Fleming was murdered on October 5, 2023, near the couple's home in Castleton, Vermont.

== Bibliography ==
- The Newscasters: The News Business As Show Business. New York: St. Martin's Press. 1977. ISBN 0-312-57207-7.
- Face Value. New York: Delacorte Press. 1979. ISBN 0-440-01649-5.
- Toot-Toot-Tootsie, Good-Bye. New York: Delacorte Press. 1981. ISBN 0-440-08190-4.
- Supertube: The Rise of Television Sports. New York: Coward-McCann. 1984. ISBN 0-698-11253-9.
- White Town Drowsing: Journeys to Hannibal. Boston: Atlantic Monthly Press. 1986. ISBN 0-871-13103-X.
- The Beast, the Eunuch, and the Glass-Eyed Child: Television in the '80s. San Diego: Harcourt Brace Jovanovich. 1990. ISBN 0-312-26240-X.
- Far From Home: Life and Loss in Two American Towns. New York: Random House. 1991. ISBN 0-394-57034-0.
- The Cruel Radiance: Notes of a Prosewriter in a Visual Age. Middlebury, VT: Middlebury College Press. 1994. ISBN 0-874-51690-0.
- Dangerous Water: A Biography of the Boy Who Became Mark Twain. New York: Da Capo Press. 1999. ISBN 0-306-81086-7.
- Tom and Huck Don't Live Here Anymore: Childhood and Murder in the Heart of America. New York: St. Martin's Press. 2001. ISBN 0-312-26240-X.
- Mark Twain: A Life. New York: Free Press. 2005. ISBN 0-7432-4899-6.
- Ron Powers (2018). No One Cares About Crazy People: My Family and the Heartbreak of Mental Illness in America. New York: Hachette. ISBN 978-0-316-34113-4.

Co-authored

- James Bradley and Ron Powers (2000). Flags of Our Fathers. New York: Bantam. ISBN 0-553-11133-7.
- Robert Morgan and Ron Powers (2001). The Man Who Flew the Memphis Belle: Memoir of a WWII Bomber Pilot. New York: Dutton Adult. ISBN 0-525-94610-1.
- John Baldwin and Ron Powers (2007). Last Flag Down: The Epic Journey of the Last Confederate Warship. New York: Crown Publishers. ISBN 978-0-307-23655-5.
- Edward M. Kennedy and Ron Powers (2009). True Compass. New York: Twelve. ISBN 978-0-446-53925-8.
