= Pentagon Papers =

U.S. defense Vietnam involvement report

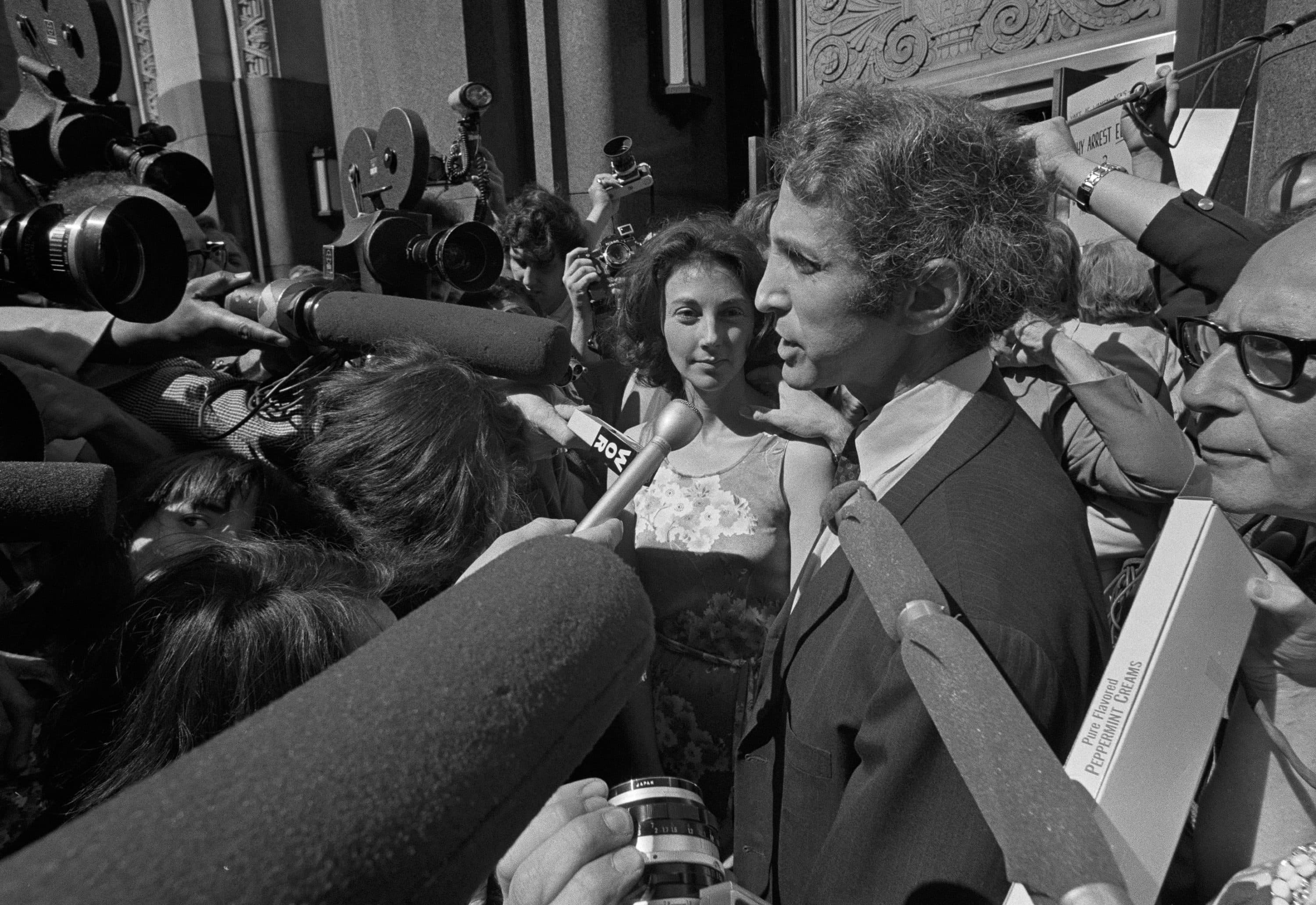
Daniel Ellsberg, the whistleblower and leaker of the Pentagon Papers, being swarmed by reporters in Boston on June 28, 1971. This press briefing was shown on a broadcast of CBS News with Walter Cronkite that evening.

The Pentagon Papers, officially titled Report of the Office of the Secretary of Defense Vietnam Task Force, is a United States Department of Defense history of the United States' political and military involvement in Vietnam from 1945 to 1968. Released by Daniel Ellsberg, who had worked on the study, it was made public on the front page of The New York Times starting on June 13, 1971. When U.S. Attorney General John N. Mitchell sought an injunction to stop the Times from publishing further material, Ellsberg forwarded a copy he made to The Washington Post, which started publishing them on June 18, 1971. A 1996 article in The New York Times said that the Pentagon Papers had demonstrated, among other things, that Lyndon B. Johnson's administration had "systematically lied, not only to the public but also to Congress".

The Pentagon Papers revealed that the U.S. had secretly enlarged the scope of its actions in the Vietnam War with coastal raids on North Vietnam and Marine Corps attacks, none of which were reported in the mainstream media. For his disclosure of the Pentagon Papers, Ellsberg was initially charged with conspiracy, espionage, and theft of government property; these charges were later dismissed, after prosecutors investigating the Watergate scandal discovered that staff members in the Nixon White House had ordered the so-called White House Plumbers to engage in unlawful efforts to discredit Ellsberg.

In June 2011, the documents forming the Pentagon Papers were declassified and publicly released.

== Contents ==
A November 1950 Central Intelligence Agency map of dissident activities in Indochina, published as part of the Pentagon Papers

Secretary of Defense Robert McNamara created the Vietnam Study Task Force on June 17, 1967, for the purpose of writing an "encyclopedic history of the Vietnam War". McNamara claimed that he wanted to leave a written record for historians, to prevent policy errors in future administrations, although Leslie H. Gelb, then director of Policy Planning at the Pentagon, has said that the notion that they were commissioned as a "cautionary tale" is a motive that McNamara only used in retrospect. McNamara told others, such as Secretary of State Dean Rusk, that he only asked for a collection of documents rather than the studies he received. Motives aside, McNamara did not inform either Rusk or President Lyndon Johnson about the study. One report claimed that McNamara had planned to give the work to his friend, Robert F. Kennedy, who was seeking the Democratic presidential nomination in 1968. McNamara later denied this, though he admitted that he ought to have informed Johnson and Rusk.

Instead of using existing Defense Department historians, McNamara assigned his close aide and Assistant Secretary of Defense John McNaughton to collect the papers. Many of them were based on papers from Richard Helms, head of the Central Intelligence Agency. McNamara wanted the study done in three months. McNaughton died in a plane crash one month after work began in June 1967, but the project continued under the direction of Defense Department official Les Gelb.

Thirty-six analysts—half of them active-duty military officers, the rest academicians and civilian federal employees—worked on the study. They worked to produce 47 volumes answering a list of 100 questions that McNamara (via his secretaries) had sent them, which included questions such as "How confident can we be about body counts of the enemy? Were programs to pacify the Vietnamese countryside working? What was the basis of President Johnson's credibility gap? Was Ho Chi Minh an Asian Tito? Did the U.S. violate the Geneva Accords on Indochina? Can we win this war?" Some of the analysts included Daniel Ellsberg, Morton Halperin, Paul Warnke, future generals Paul F. Gorman and John Galvin, historian Melvin Gurtov, economists Hans Heymann and Richard Moorstein, and future top diplomat Richard Holbrooke, who drafted a volume.

The analysts largely used existing files in the Office of the Secretary of Defense. To keep the study secret from others, including National Security Advisor Walt Rostow, they conducted no interviews or consultations with the armed forces, with the White House, or with other federal agencies.

McNamara left the Defense Department in February 1968, and his successor Clark Clifford received the finished study on January 15, 1969, five days before Richard Nixon's inauguration, although Clifford claimed he never read it. Gelb said in 1991 that he presented the study to McNamara in early 1969, when the latter was president of the World Bank, but McNamara did not read it then, and as late as 2018 Gelb did not know if McNamara ever read the study later in his life.

The study consisted of 3,000 pages of historical analysis and 4,000 pages of original government documents in 47 volumes, and was classified as "Top Secret – Sensitive". ("Sensitive" is not an official security designation; it meant that access to the study should be controlled.) The task force made 15 copies; the think tank RAND Corporation received two of the copies from Gelb, Morton Halperin and Paul Warnke, with access granted if at least two of the three approved.

=== Organization and content of the documents ===
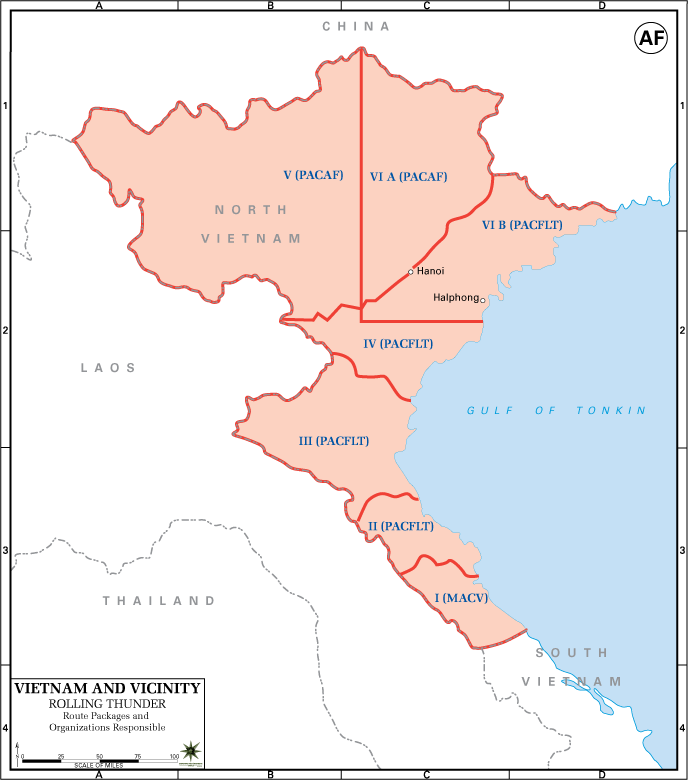
Route Packages, areas of bombing over North Vietnam, for Operation Rolling Thunder, mentioned in the Papers

The 47 volumes of the papers were organized as follows:

I. Vietnam and the U.S., 1940–1950 (1 Vol.)

A. U.S. Policy, 1940–50
B. The Character and Power of the Viet Minh
C. Ho Chi Minh: Asian Tito?

II. U.S. Involvement in the Franco–Viet Minh War, 1950–1954 (1 Vol.)

A. U.S., France and Vietnamese Nationalism
B. Toward a Negotiated Settlement

III. The Geneva Accords (1 Vol.)

A. U.S. Military Planning and Diplomatic Maneuver
B. Role and Obligations of State of Vietnam
C. Viet Minh Position and Sino–Soviet Strategy
D. The Intent of the Geneva Accords

IV. Evolution of the War (26 Vols.)

A. U.S. MAP for Diem: The Eisenhower Commitments, 1954–1960 (5 Vols.)

1. NATO and SEATO: A Comparison
2. Aid for France in Indochina, 1950–54
3. U.S. and France's Withdrawal from Vietnam, 1954–56
4. U.S. Training of Vietnamese National Army, 1954–59
5. Origins of the Insurgency

B. Counterinsurgency: The Kennedy Commitments, 1961–1963 (5 Vols.)

1. The Kennedy Commitments and Programs, 1961
2. Strategic Hamlet Program, 1961–63
3. The Advisory Build-up, 1961–67
4. Phased Withdrawal of U.S. Forces in Vietnam, 1962–64
5. The Overthrow of Ngo Dinh Diem, May–Nov. 1963

C. Direct Action: The Johnson Commitments, 1964–1968 (16 Vols.)

1. U.S. Programs in South Vietnam, November 1963–April 1965: NSAM 273 – NSAM 288 – Honolulu
2. Military Pressures Against NVN (3 Vols.)

a. February–June 1964
b. July–October 1964
c. November–December 1964

3. Rolling Thunder Program Begins: January–June 1965
4. Marine Combat Units Go to DaNang, March 1965
5. Phase I in the Build-Up of U.S. Forces: March–July 1965
6. U.S. Ground Strategy and Force Deployments: 1965–1967 (3 Vols.)

a. Volume I: Phase II, Program 3, Program 4
b. Volume II: Program 5
c. Volume III: Program 6

7. Air War in the North: 1965–1968 (2 Vols)

a. Volume I
b. Volume II

8. Re-emphasis on Pacification: 1965–1967
9. U.S.–GVN Relations (2 Vols.)

a. Volume 1: December 1963 – June 1965
b. Volume 2: July 1965 – December 1967

10. Statistical Survey of the War, North and South: 1965–1967

V. Justification of the War (11 Vols.)

A. Public Statements (2 Vols.)

Volume I: A – The Truman Administration

B – The Eisenhower Administration
C – The Kennedy Administration

Volume II: D – The Johnson Administration

B. Internal Documents (9 Vols.)

1. The Roosevelt Administration
2. The Truman Administration: (2 Vols.)

a. Volume I: 1945–1949
b. Volume II: 1950–1952

3. The Eisenhower Administration: (4 Vols.)

a. Volume I: 1953
b. Volume II: 1954–Geneva
c. Volume III: Geneva Accords – 15 March 1956
d. Volume IV: 1956 French Withdrawal – 1960

4. The Kennedy Administration (2 Vols.)

Book I
Book II

VI. Settlement of the Conflict (6 Vols.)

A. Negotiations, 1965–67: The Public Record
B. Negotiations, 1965–67: Announced Position Statements
C. Histories of Contacts (4 Vols.)

1. 1965–1966
2. Polish Track
3. Moscow–London Track
4. 1967–1968

=== Actual objective of the Vietnam War: Containment of China ===
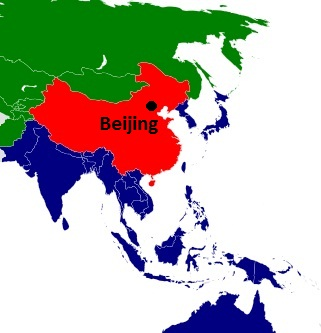
As laid out by U.S. Secretary of Defense Robert McNamara, the Chinese containment policy of the United States was a long-run strategic effort to surround Beijing with the USSR, its satellite states, as well as: 1. The Japan–Korea front, 2. The India–Pakistan front, and; 3. The Southeast Asia front

Although President Johnson stated that the aim of the Vietnam War was to secure an "independent, non-Communist South Vietnam", a January 1965 memorandum by Assistant Secretary of Defense John McNaughton stated that an underlying justification was "not to help friend, but to contain China".

On November 3, 1965, Secretary of Defense McNamara sent a memorandum to Johnson, in which he explained the "major policy decisions with respect to our course of action in Vietnam". The memorandum begins by disclosing the rationale behind the bombing of North Vietnam in February 1965:

The February decision to bomb North Vietnam and the July approval of Phase I deployments make sense only if they are in support of a long-run United States policy to contain China.

McNamara accused China of harboring imperial aspirations like those of the German Empire, Nazi Germany, Imperial Japan and the Soviet Union. According to McNamara, the Chinese were conspiring to "organize all of Asia" against the United States:

China—like Germany in 1917, like Germany in the West and Japan in the East in the late 30s, and like the USSR in 1947—looms as a major power threatening to undercut our importance and effectiveness in the world and, more remotely but more menacingly, to organize all of Asia against us.

To encircle the Chinese, the United States aimed to establish "three fronts" as part of a "long-run effort to contain China":

There are three fronts to a long-run effort to contain China (realizing that the USSR "contains" China on the north and northwest):

(a) the Japan–Korea front;

(b) the India–Pakistan front; and

(c) the Southeast Asia front.

However, McNamara believed that the containment of China would sacrifice a large amount of time, money and American lives.

=== Internal affairs of Vietnam ===
Years before the Gulf of Tonkin incident occurred on August 2, 1964, the U.S. government was indirectly involved in Vietnam's affairs by sending advisers or (military personnel) to train the South Vietnamese soldiers:

- Under President Harry S. Truman, the U.S. government aided France and its associated State of Vietnam against the communist-led Viet Minh from 1950 during the First Indochina War.
- Under President Dwight D. Eisenhower, the U.S. government played a "direct role in the ultimate breakdown of the Geneva settlement" in 1954 by supporting the fledgling South under the State of Vietnam (later becoming the Republic of Vietnam) and covertly undermining the communist country of the North.
- Under President John F. Kennedy, the U.S. government transformed its policy towards Vietnam from a limited "gamble" to a broad "commitment".
- Under President Johnson, the U.S. government began waging covert military operations against communist North Vietnam in defense of South Vietnam.

==== Role of the United States in the rise of President Diem ====
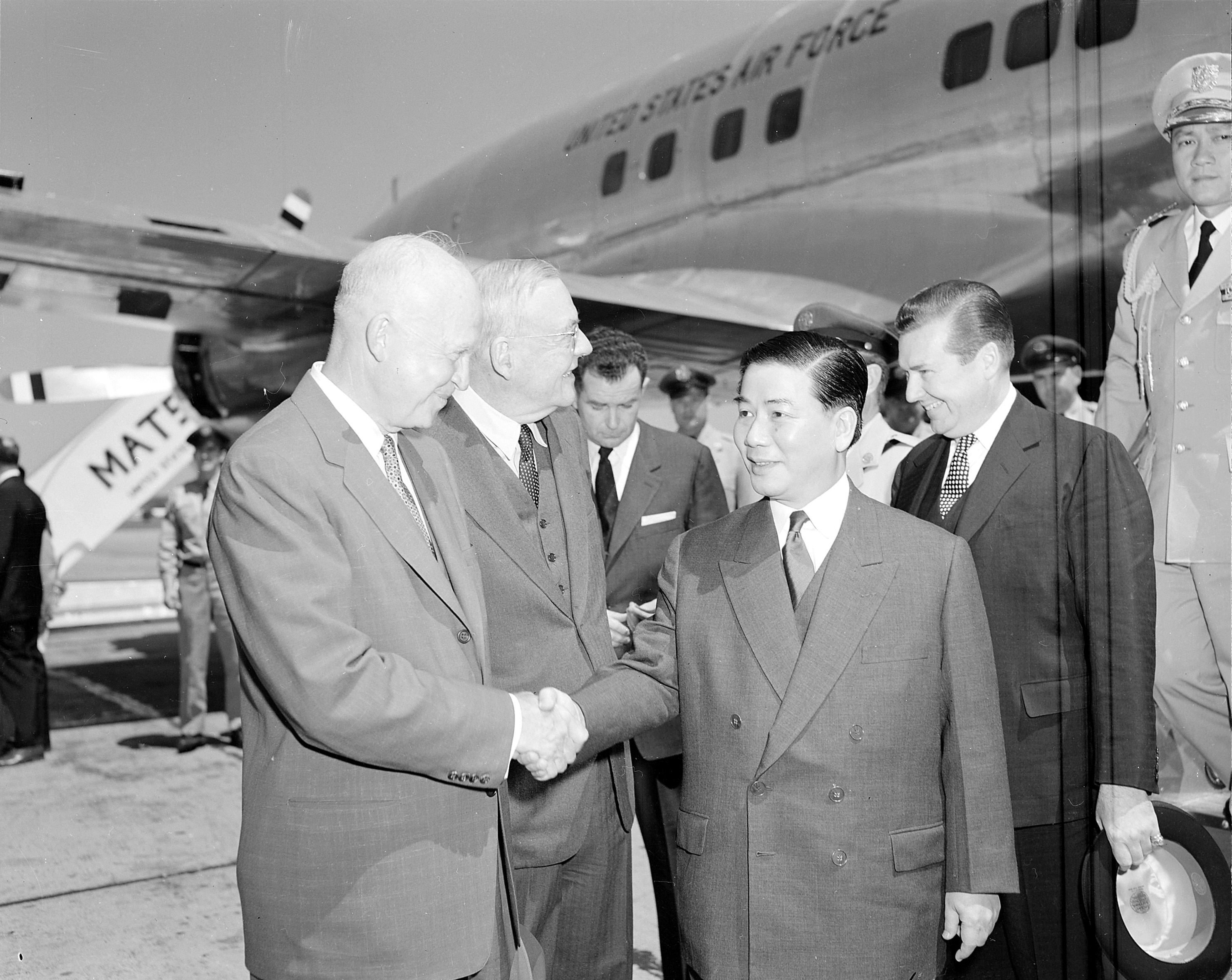
U.S. President Dwight D. Eisenhower greets South Vietnam's President Ngo Dinh Diem, whose rise to power was backed by the United States, according to the Pentagon Papers

In a section of the Pentagon Papers titled "Kennedy Commitments and Programs", American commitment to South Vietnam was attributed to the "creation" of the country by the United States to prevent the spread of communism during the global Cold War. As acknowledged by the papers:

We must note that South Vietnam (unlike any of the other countries in Southeast Asia) was essentially the creation of the United States.

In a sub-section titled "Special American Commitment to Vietnam", the papers emphasized once again the role played by the United States:

- Without U.S. support [Ngo Dinh] Diem almost certainly could not have consolidated his hold on the South during 1955 and 1956.
- Without the threat of U.S. intervention, South Vietnam could not have refused to even discuss the elections called for in 1956 under the Geneva settlement without being immediately overrun by the Viet Minh armies.
- Without U.S. aid in the years following, the Diem regime certainly, and an independent South Vietnam almost as certainly, could not have survived.

More specifically, the United States sent US$28.4 million worth of equipment and supplies to help the Diem regime strengthen its army. In addition, 32,000 men from South Vietnam's Civil Guard were trained by the United States at a cost of US$12.7 million. It was hoped that Diem's regime, after receiving a significant amount of U.S. assistance, would be able to withstand the Viet Cong.

The papers identified General Edward Lansdale, who served in the Office of Strategic Services (OSS) and worked for the Central Intelligence Agency (CIA), as a "key figure" in the establishment of Diem as the president of South Vietnam, and the backing of Diem's regime thereafter. As written by Lansdale in a 1961 memorandum: "We (the U.S.) must support Ngo Dinh Diem until another strong executive can replace him legally."

==== Role of the United States in the overthrow of Diem's regime ====
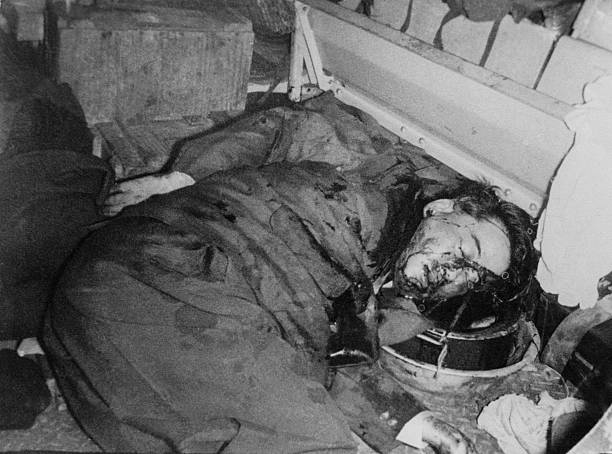
The body of President Diệm after he was assassinated in the 1963 South Vietnamese coup, which was backed by the United States government

According to the Pentagon Papers, the U.S. government played a key role in the 1963 South Vietnamese coup, in which Diem was assassinated. While maintaining "clandestine contact" with Vietnamese generals planning a coup, the U.S. cut off its aid to President Diem and openly supported a successor government in what the authors called an "essentially leaderless Vietnam":

For the military coup d'etat against Ngo Dinh Diem, the U.S. must accept its full share of responsibility. Beginning in August 1963 we variously authorized, sanctioned and encouraged the coup efforts of the Vietnamese generals and offered full support for a successor government.

In October we cut off aid to Diem in a direct rebuff, giving a green light to the generals. We maintained clandestine contact with them throughout the planning and execution of the coup and sought to review their operational plans and proposed new government.

Thus, as the nine-year rule of Diem came to a bloody end, our complicity in his overthrow heightened our responsibilities and our commitment in an essentially leaderless Vietnam.

As early as August 23, 1963, an unnamed U.S. representative had met with Vietnamese generals planning a coup against Diem. According to The New York Times, this U.S. representative was later identified to be CIA officer Lucien Conein.

=== Proposed operations ===
The Director of Central Intelligence, John A. McCone, proposed the following categories of military action:

- Category 1 – Air raids on major Viet Cong supply centers, conducted simultaneously by the Republic of Vietnam Air Force and the United States Air Force (codenamed Farmgate)
- Category 2 – Cross-border raids on major Viet Cong supply centers, conducted by South Vietnamese units and US military advisers.
- Category 3 – Limited air strikes on North Vietnamese targets by unmarked planes flown exclusively by non-US aircrews.

However, McCone did not believe these military actions alone could lead to an escalation of the situation because the "fear of escalation would probably restrain the Communists". In a memorandum addressed to President Johnson on July 28, 1964, McCone explained:

In response to the first or second categories of action, local Communist military forces in the areas of actual attack would react vigorously, but we believe that none of the Communist powers involved would respond with major military moves designed to change the nature of the conflict ... Air strikes on North Vietnam itself (Category 3) would evoke sharper Communist reactions than air strikes confined to targets in Laos, but even in this case fear of escalation would probably restrain the Communists from a major military response ...

Barely a month after the Gulf of Tonkin incident on August 2, 1964, National Security Advisor McGeorge Bundy warned that further provocations should not be undertaken until October, when the government of South Vietnam (GVN) would become fully prepared for a full-scale war against North Vietnam. In a memorandum addressed to President Johnson on September 8, 1964, Bundy wrote:

The main further question is the extent to which we should add elements to the above actions that would tend deliberately to provoke a DRV reaction, and consequent retaliation by us.

Examples of actions to be considered were running US naval patrols increasingly close to the North Vietnamese coast and/or [sic] associating them with 34A operations.

We believe such deliberately provocative elements should not be added in the immediate future while the GVN is still struggling to its feet. By early October, however, we may recommend such actions depending on GVN progress and Communist reaction in the meantime, especially to US naval patrols.

While maritime operations played a key role in the provocation of North Vietnam, U.S. military officials had initially proposed to fly a Lockheed U-2 reconnaissance aircraft over the country, but this was to be replaced by other plans.

== Leak ==
=== Ellsberg meets Sheehan ===
Daniel Ellsberg knew the leaders of the task force well. He had worked as an aide to McNaughton from 1964 to 1965, had worked on the study for several months in 1967, and Gelb and Halperin approved his access to the work at RAND in 1969. Now opposing the war, Ellsberg and his friend Anthony Russo photocopied the study in October 1969 intending to disclose it. Ellsberg approached Nixon's National Security Advisor Henry Kissinger, Senators William Fulbright and George McGovern, and others, but none were interested.

Ellsberg showed some of the documents privately to sympathetic policy experts Marcus Raskin and Ralph Stavins of the Institute for Policy Studies. They declined to publish the papers, but passed on some of them to, and recommended he seek The New York Times reporter Neil Sheehan, whom Ellsberg had first met in Vietnam and was urged to meet with by Raskin and Stavins. After discussing them in February 1971, Ellsberg gave 43 of the volumes to Sheehan on March 2.

=== Sheehan makes copies ===
Ellsberg had initially requested that Sheehan only take notes of the study in Ellsberg's apartment; Sheehan disobeyed, frantically copying them in numerous shops in the Boston area at the urging of and with help from his wife Susan Sheehan, and flying with the copies to Washington, where he and an editor there worked in a hotel room at The Jefferson to organize and read them. Editors A. M. Rosenthal and James L. Greenfield had the copies delivered by mail first to Greenfield's apartment, then Greenfield and his wife drove them to multiple rooms at the New York Hilton Midtown. There, Sheehan, Rosenthal, Greenfield, deputy foreign editors Gerald Gold and Allan M. Siegal, a team of three writers—Fox Butterfield, Hedrick Smith, and E. W. Kenworthy—and researcher Linda Amster worked around the clock to organize and summarize them for publication. Sheehan would also give some copies to the Times Washington bureau chief Max Frankel, who would then help shepherd the papers into print. Before publication, The New York Times sought legal advice. The paper's regular outside counsel, Lord Day & Lord, advised against publication, but in-house counsel James Goodale prevailed with his argument that the press had a First Amendment right to publish information significant to the people's understanding of their government's policy.

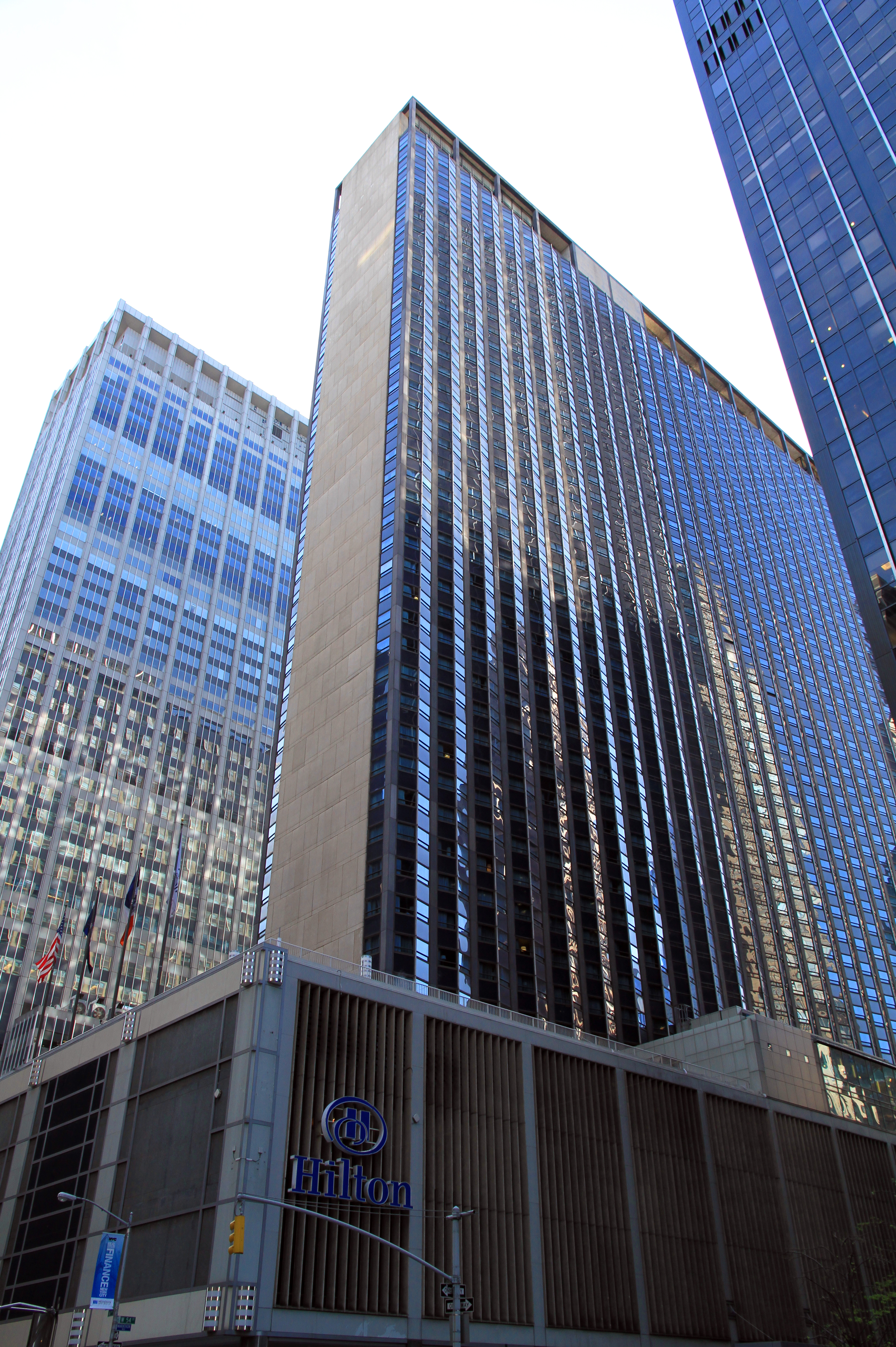
The New York Hilton Midtown (pictured in 2013), where Times reporters organized the Papers for publication in spring 1971

=== Start of publication ===
The New York Times began publishing excerpts on June 13, 1971; the first article in the series was titled "Vietnam Archive: Pentagon Study Traces Three Decades of Growing US Involvement". The study was dubbed the Pentagon Papers during the resulting media publicity. Street protests, political controversy, and lawsuits followed.

=== Entry into the Congressional Record ===
To ensure the possibility of public debate about the papers' content, on June 29, US Senator Mike Gravel, an Alaska Democrat, entered 4,100 pages of the papers into the record of his Subcommittee on Public Buildings and Grounds. These portions of the papers, which were edited for Gravel by Howard Zinn and Noam Chomsky, and given directly to Gravel by Ben Bagdikian, the then national editor of The Washington Post in a June 26 meeting in front of the Mayflower Hotel at midnight, were smuggled into Gravel's congressional office and guarded zealously by disabled Vietnam veterans beforehand, and subsequently published by Beacon Press, the publishing arm of the Unitarian Universalist Association of Congregations. A federal grand jury was subsequently empaneled to investigate possible violations of federal law in the release of the report. Leonard Rodberg, a Gravel aide, was subpoenaed to testify about his role in obtaining and arranging for publication of the Pentagon Papers. Gravel asked the court (in Gravel v. United States) to quash the subpoena on the basis of the Speech or Debate Clause in Article I, Section 6 of the United States Constitution.

That clause provides that "for any Speech or Debate in either House, [a Senator or Representative] shall not be questioned in any other Place", meaning that Gravel could not be prosecuted for anything said on the Senate floor, and, by extension, for anything entered to the Congressional Record, allowing the papers to be publicly read without threat of a treason trial and conviction. When Gravel's request was reviewed by the U.S. Supreme Court, the Court denied the request to extend this protection to Gravel or Rodberg because the grand jury subpoena served on them related to a third party rather than any act they themselves committed for the preparation of materials later entered into the Congressional Record. Nevertheless, the grand jury investigation was halted, and the publication of the papers was never prosecuted.

Later, Ellsberg said the documents "demonstrated unconstitutional behavior by a succession of presidents, the violation of their oath and the violation of the oath of every one of their subordinates." He added that he leaked the Papers to end what he perceived to be "a wrongful war"; in an interview in 2015, Neil Sheehan described Ellsberg's state of mind at the time as "totally conflicted" between getting the Papers published and not wanting to go to prison.

=== The Nixon administration's restraint of the media ===
Seeing that the publication of the study initially embarrassed the Johnson and Kennedy administrations rather than his own, President Nixon deliberately chose to do nothing about it; however, Kissinger convinced the president that not opposing the publication set a negative precedent for future secrets. It is also theorized that Kissinger's previous work with Ellsberg at RAND would damage his standing in Nixon's eyes and that anticipating this, he distanced himself from Ellsberg. In addition, Kissinger feared that Ellsberg could leak other defense secrets that would harm his reputation, including nuclear targeting. The administration argued Ellsberg and Russo were guilty of a felony under the Espionage Act of 1917, because they had no authority to publish classified documents. After failing to persuade The New York Times to voluntarily cease publication on June 14, Attorney General John N. Mitchell and Nixon obtained a federal court injunction forcing The New York Times to cease publication after three articles. The New York Times publisher Arthur Ochs Sulzberger said:

These papers, as our editorial said this morning, were really a part of history that should have been made available considerably longer ago. I just didn't feel there was any breach of national security, in the sense that we were giving secrets to the enemy.

The newspaper appealed the injunction, and the case New York Times Co. v. United States quickly rose through the U.S. legal system to the Supreme Court.

On June 18, 1971, The Washington Post began publishing its own series of articles based upon the Pentagon Papers; Ellsberg had given portions to The Washington Post reporter and former RAND Corporation colleague Ben Bagdikian in a Boston-area motel earlier that week. Bagdikian flew with the portions to Washington and physically presented them to executive editor Ben Bradlee at the latter's house in the Georgetown neighborhood; Bradlee set up a team of writers, lawyers and editors to hide out in his house and organize the portions. Bagdikian later met with Mike Gravel in front of the Mayflower Hotel on June 26 to give him copies. On June 18, Assistant U.S. Attorney General William Rehnquist asked The Washington Post to cease publication. After the paper refused, Rehnquist sought an injunction in U.S. district court. Judge Murray Gurfein declined to issue such an injunction, writing that "[t]he security of the Nation is not at the ramparts alone. Security also lies in the value of our free institutions. A cantankerous press, an obstinate press, a ubiquitous press must be suffered by those in authority to preserve the even greater values of freedom of expression and the right of the people to know." The government appealed that decision, and on June 26 the Supreme Court agreed to hear it jointly with The New York Times case. Fifteen other newspapers received copies of the study and began publishing it. According to Ellsberg in 2017 and 2021, 19 newspapers in total eventually drew on the Papers for their investigative work; the Post's then court reporter Sanford J. Ungar wrote in his May 1972 book The Papers and The Papers that aside from the Times and the Post, The Boston Globe and the St. Louis Post-Dispatch had also been brought to court by the Nixon administration over coverage of the Papers.

=== The Supreme Court allows further publication ===
On June 30, 1971, the Supreme Court decided, 6–3, that the government failed to meet the heavy burden of proof required for prior restraint injunction. The nine justices wrote nine opinions disagreeing on significant, substantive matters.

Only a free and unrestrained press can effectively expose deception in government. And paramount among the responsibilities of a free press is the duty to prevent any part of the government from deceiving the people and sending them off to distant lands to die of foreign fevers and foreign shot and shell.

— Justice Black

Thomas Tedford and Dale Herbeck summarized the reaction of editors and journalists at the time:

As the press rooms of the Times and the Post began to hum to the lifting of the censorship order, the journalists of America pondered with grave concern the fact that for fifteen days the 'free press' of the nation had been prevented from publishing an important document and for their troubles had been given an inconclusive and uninspiring 'burden-of-proof' decision by a sharply divided Supreme Court. There was relief, but no great rejoicing, in the editorial offices of America's publishers and broadcasters.

— Tedford and Herbeck, pp. 225–226.

=== Legal charges against Ellsberg ===
Ellsberg surrendered to authorities at the U.S. Attorney's office in Boston on June 28, and admitted that he had given the papers to the press: "I felt that as an American citizen, as a responsible citizen, I could no longer cooperate in concealing this information from the American public. I did this clearly at my own jeopardy and I am prepared to answer to all the consequences of this decision". He was indicted by a grand jury in Los Angeles on charges of stealing and holding secret documents. Federal District Judge William Matthew Byrne, Jr. declared a mistrial and dismissed all charges against Ellsberg and Russo on May 11, 1973, after it was revealed that agents acting on the orders of the Nixon administration illegally broke into the office of Ellsberg's psychiatrist and attempted to steal files; representatives of the Nixon administration approached the Ellsberg trial judge with an offer of the job of FBI directorship; and several irregularities appeared in the government's case, including its claim that it had lost records of illegal wiretapping against Ellsberg conducted by the White House Plumbers in the contemporaneous Watergate scandal. Byrne ruled: "The totality of the circumstances of this case which I have only briefly sketched offend a sense of justice. The bizarre events have incurably infected the prosecution of this case." Ellsberg and Russo were freed due to the mistrial; they were not acquitted of violating the Espionage Act.

In March 1972, political scientist Samuel L. Popkin, then assistant professor of Government at Harvard University, was jailed for a week for his refusal to answer questions before a grand jury investigating the Pentagon Papers case, during a hearing before the Boston Federal District Court. The Faculty Council later passed a resolution condemning the government's interrogation of scholars on the grounds that "an unlimited right of grand juries to ask any question and to expose a witness to citations for contempt could easily threaten scholarly research".

Gelb estimated that The New York Times only published about five percent of the study's 7,000 pages. The Beacon Press edition was also incomplete. Halperin, who had originally classified the study as secret, obtained most of the unpublished portions under the Freedom of Information Act and the University of Texas published them in 1983. The National Security Archive published the remaining portions in 2002. The study itself remained formally classified until 2011.

== Impact ==
The Pentagon Papers revealed that the United States had expanded its war with the bombing of Cambodia and Laos, coastal raids on North Vietnam, and Marine Corps attacks, none of which had been reported by the American media. The most damaging revelations in the papers revealed that four administrations (Truman, Eisenhower, Kennedy, and Johnson) had misled the public regarding their intentions. For example, the Eisenhower administration actively worked against the Geneva Accords. The Kennedy administration knew of plans to overthrow South Vietnamese leader Ngo Dinh Diem before his death in the November 1963 coup. Johnson had decided to expand the war while promising "we seek no wider war" during his 1964 presidential campaign, including plans to bomb North Vietnam well before the 1964 United States presidential election. President Johnson had been outspoken against doing so during the election and claimed that his opponent Barry Goldwater was the one that wanted to bomb North Vietnam.

In another example, a memo from the Defense Department under the Johnson Administration listed the reasons for American persistence:

- 70% – To avoid a humiliating U.S. defeat (to our reputation as a guarantor).
- 20% – To keep [South Vietnam] (and the adjacent) territory from Chinese hands.
- 10% – To permit the people [of South Vietnam] to enjoy a better, freer way of life.
- ALSO – To emerge from the crisis without unacceptable taint from methods used.
- NOT – To help a friend, although it would be hard to stay in if asked out.

Another controversy was that Johnson had severely escalated the Vietnam War by July 1965, per the cable stating that "Deputy Secretary of Defense Cyrus Vance informs McNamara that President had approved 34 Battalion Plan and will try to push through reserve call-up."

In 1988, when that cable was declassified, it revealed "there was a continuing uncertainty as to [Johnson's] final decision, which would have to await Secretary McNamara's recommendation and the views of Congressional leaders, particularly the views of Senator [Richard] Russell."

Nixon's Solicitor General Erwin N. Griswold later called the Pentagon Papers an example of "massive overclassification" with "no trace of a threat to the national security". The Pentagon Papers' publication had little or no effect on the ongoing war because they dealt with documents written years before publication.

After the release of the Pentagon Papers, Barry Goldwater said:

During the campaign, President Johnson kept reiterating that he would never send American boys to fight in Vietnam. As I say, he knew at the time that American boys were going to be sent. In fact, I knew about ten days before the Republican Convention. You see I was being called a trigger-happy, warmonger, bomb happy, and all the time Johnson was saying, he would never send American boys, I knew damn well he would.

Senator Birch Bayh, who thought the publishing of the Pentagon Papers was justified, said:

The existence of these documents, and the fact that they said one thing and the people were led to believe something else, is a reason we have a credibility gap today, the reason people don't believe the government. This is the same thing that's been going on over the last two-and-a-half years of this administration. There is a difference between what the President says and what the government actually does, and I have confidence that they are going to make the right decision, if they have all the facts.

Leslie H. Gelb's signature, taken from the index (page 7) of the Papers

In 1991, Les Gelb said the following:

But I cannot say that I was pleased. I worried about the turmoil that would enter my life, then as a scholar at the Brookings Institution. I worried about the potential misuse of the papers by doves to stamp government leaders as liars and by hawks to brand war critics as traitors.

What troubled me was that the papers—a vast, undigested mass of fragmentary truths—in the newspapers would become like sticks of historical dynamite, damaging more than illuminating the ongoing struggle over Vietnam policy.

How publication affected that struggle is still unclear. But then and now and above all, the Times' publication insured what mattered most to those of us who wrote the studies and to our democracy—that the papers would live.

Gelb reflected in 2018 that many people have misunderstood the most important lessons of the Pentagon Papers:

Ellsberg created the myth that what the Papers show is that it all was a bunch of lies... [The truth] is, people actually believed in the war and were ignorant about what could and could not actually be done to do well in that war. That's what you see when you actually read the Papers, as opposed to talk about the Papers...

[M]y first instinct was that if they just hit the papers, people would think this was the definitive history of the war, which they were not, and that people would, would think it was all about lying, rather than beliefs. And look, because we'd never learned that darn lesson about believing our way into these wars, we went into Afghanistan and we went into Iraq...

You know, we get involved in these wars and we don't know a damn thing about those countries, the culture, the history, the politics, people on top and even down below. And, my heavens, these are not wars like World War II and World War I, where you have battalions fighting battalions. These are wars that depend on knowledge of who the people are, what the culture is like. And we jumped into them without knowing. That's the damned essential message of the Pentagon Papers...

I don't deny the lies. I just want [the American people] to understand what the main points really were.

== Full release in 2011 ==
On May 4, 2011, the National Archives and Records Administration announced that the papers would be declassified and released to the Richard Nixon Presidential Library and Museum in Yorba Linda, California, on June 13, 2011. The release date included the Nixon, Kennedy, and Johnson Libraries and the Archives office in College Park, Maryland.

The full release was coordinated by the Archives's National Declassification Center (NDC) as a special project to mark the anniversary of the report. There were still eleven words that the agencies having classification control over the material wanted to redact, and the NDC worked with them, successfully, to prevent that redaction. It is unknown which 11 words were at issue and the government has declined requests to identify them, but the issue was made moot when it was pointed out that those words had already been made public, in a version of the documents released by the House Armed Services Committee in 1972.

The Archives released each volume of the Pentagon Papers as a separate PDF file, available on their website.

== In films and television ==
=== Films ===
- The Pentagon Papers (2003), directed by Rod Holcomb and executive produced by Joshua D. Maurer, is a historical film made for FX, in association with Paramount Television and City Entertainment, about the Pentagon Papers and Daniel Ellsberg's involvement in their publication. The film chronicles Ellsberg's life, beginning with his work for the RAND Corporation, and ending with the day on which his espionage trial was declared a mistrial by a federal court judge. The film starred James Spader as Ellsberg, Paul Giamatti as Russo, Alan Arkin as RAND Corporation president Harry Rowen, and Claire Forlani as Patricia Ellsberg.
- The Most Dangerous Man in America: Daniel Ellsberg and the Pentagon Papers (2009) is an Oscar-nominated documentary film, directed by Judith Ehrlich and Rick Goldsmith, that follows Ellsberg and explores the events leading up to the publication of the Pentagon Papers.
- The Post (2017) is an historical drama film directed by Steven Spielberg from a script written by Liz Hannah and Josh Singer about the role The Washington Post played in the Pentagon Papers saga. The film stars Tom Hanks as Post editor Ben Bradlee and Meryl Streep as Post publisher Katharine Graham. Daniel Ellsberg is played by Matthew Rhys.

=== Television ===
- The Pentagon Papers, Daniel Ellsberg and The Times. PBS. October 4, 2010. Archived from the original on August 28, 2008. "On September 13, 2010, The New York Times Community Affairs Department and POV presented a panel discussion on the Pentagon Papers, Daniel Ellsberg, and the Times. The conversation, featuring Daniel Ellsberg, Max Frankel, former The New York Times executive editor, and Adam Liptak, The New York Times Supreme Court reporter, was moderated by Jill Abramson, managing editor of The New York Times and former Washington bureau chief, marking the 35th anniversary of the Supreme Court ruling."
- Daniel Ellsberg: Secrets – Vietnam and the Pentagon Papers. University of California Television (UCTV). August 7, 2008. Archived from the original on November 14, 2021.

== See also ==
- Afghanistan Papers
- "Credibility gap"
- Edward Snowden
- Global surveillance disclosures
- Israeli retaliation leak
- James L. Greenfield
- Operation Popeye — U.S. weather modification operation, revealed in the Pentagon Papers
- United States diplomatic cables leak
- WikiLeaks
- 2023 Pentagon document leaks
