= Gail Caldwell =

American critic

Gail Caldwell (born January 20, 1951) is an American critic and author. She was the chief book critic for The Boston Globe, where she was on staff from 1985 to 2009. Caldwell was the winner of the 2001 Pulitzer Prize for Criticism. The award was for eight Sunday reviews and two other columns written in 2000. According to the Pulitzer Prize board, those columns were noted for “her insightful observations on contemporary life and literature.”

Caldwell was born and raised in Amarillo, Texas. After graduating from Tascosa High School, she attended Texas Tech University for a while but transferred to University of Texas at Austin and obtained two degrees in American studies. She was an instructor at the University of Texas until 1981. Before joining The Boston Globe, Caldwell taught feature writing at Boston University, worked as the arts editor of the Boston Review and wrote for the publications New England Monthly and Village Voice.

She lives in Cambridge, Massachusetts and wrote the 2006 memoir, A Strong West Wind : A Memoir and the 2010 Let's Take the Long Way Home, a memoir of her friendship with author Caroline Knapp. Caldwell published a third memoir in 2014, New Life, No Instructions, about her childhood bout with polio.
