= Itabari Njeri =

American novelist

- Education: Boston University (BSc); Columbia University (MS); Harvard University (PhD)
- Occupations: Journalist; novelist; memoirist
- Writing career
- Notable awards: American Book Award (1990)

Itabari Njeri is an American journalist, novelist, and memoirist.

== Life ==
Njeri was raised in Brooklyn and Harlem. She graduated from Boston University with a BSc, then from Columbia University with an MS.

In 1978, she joined the Miami Herald, and then later accepted a position at the Los Angeles Times.

In 1992, she was a finalist for the Pulitzer Prize for Criticism.

In 1995, she was appointed writer-in-residence and visiting lecturer at Washington University in St. Louis. She then pursued a PhD in the history of American civilization at Harvard University, focusing on race, gender, and violence in US film and literature.

Her work has appeared in Harper's Magazine.

== Awards ==
- 1990 American Book Award for Every Good-Bye Ain't Gone

== Works ==
=== Books ===
- Every Good-Bye Ain't Gone: Family Portraits and Personal Escapades. Vintage Books. 1991. ISBN 978-0-679-73242-6.
- The Last Plantation: Color, Conflict, and Identity: Reflections of a New World Black. Houghton Mifflin. 1997. ISBN 978-0-395-77191-4.
- Shadowed Feats: Untold Story. Farrar, Straus & Giroux. 2006. ISBN 978-0-374-26185-6.
- The Secret Life of Fred Astaire

=== Book chapters ===
- "The Last Plantation". 'Mixed race' studies: a reader. Jayne O. Ifekwunigwe (ed.). Routledge. 2004. ISBN 978-0-415-32163-1.
