= Alan M. Kriegsman =

American dance critic (1928-2012)

- Born: February 28, 1928; Brooklyn, New York
- Died: August 31, 2012 (aged 84); Chevy Chase, Maryland
- Education: Massachusetts Institute of Technology; Columbia University (BS, MA)
- Occupation: Dance critic

Alan M. Kriegsman (February 28, 1928 – August 31, 2012) was an American dance critic. He won the 1976 Pulitzer Prize for his work at The Washington Post, the first to win the Pulitzer Prize for Criticism for reporting as a dance critic.

== Biography ==
Kriegsman was born in Brooklyn, New York, and grew up in Far Rockaway, Queens, graduating from Far Rockaway High School in 1945. He attended the Massachusetts Institute of Technology and earned a B.S. and M.A. in musicology at Columbia University, where he also completed doctoral coursework. He served in the United States Army from 1946 to 1947. He attended the University of Vienna in 1956 and 1957 as a Fulbright scholar. He married the former Sali Ann Ribakove in 1957.

He taught at Columbia University, Barnard College, George Washington University, Hunter College, the Juilliard School and Temple University. From 1960 to 1965, he was a music, drama, and dance critic for the San Diego Union.

== Dance critic career ==
He returned to New York City, where he was assistant to the president of the Juilliard School in 1965 and 1966. He became a music and performing arts critic and columnist for The Washington Post starting in 1966 and was its dance critic from 1974 to his retirement in 1996. While with The Washington Post, Kriegsman won the Pulitzer Prize for Criticism in 1976, the first to receive the award for work in the dance field. After he retired in 1996, he was succeeded by Sarah Kaufman as dance critic, who would go on to win the 2010 Pulitzer Prize for her dance criticism. Kaufman, in a question and answer session in The Washington Post, credited Kriegsman as her "hero, friend and mentor"

== Death ==
Kriegsman died on August 31, 2012, at his home in Chevy Chase, Maryland, at age 84.
