= Joe Morgenstern =

American film critic (born 1932)

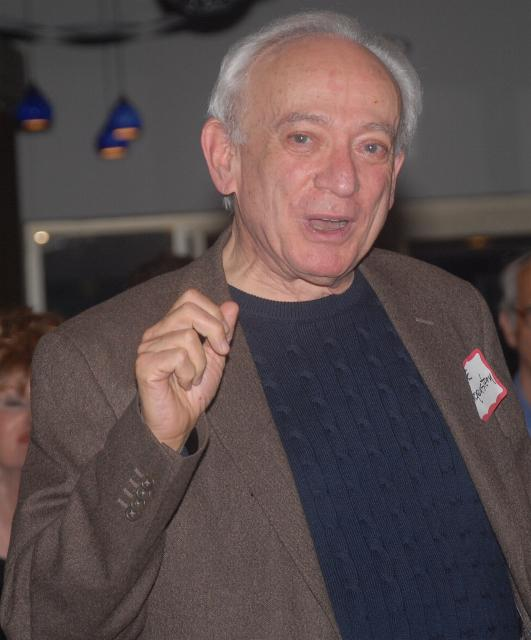
- Morgenstern in 2008
- Born: October 3, 1932 (age 93); New York City, U.S.
- Education: Lehigh University (BA)
- Occupations: Film critic; journalist; screenwriter
- Spouse: Piper Laurie (m. 1962; div. 1982)
- Children: 1
- Writing career
- Subject: Film
- Notable awards: Pulitzer Prize for Criticism (2005)

Joe Morgenstern (born October 3, 1932) is an American writer and retired film critic. He wrote for Newsweek from 1965 to 1983, and then for The Wall Street Journal from 1995 to 2022. He won the Pulitzer Prize for Criticism in 2005. Morgenstern has also written for television.

== Career ==
From 1965 to 1983 Morgenstern was film critic for Newsweek. During this time, he panned Bonnie and Clyde and then reconsidered his opinion seriously enough to retract it in the next issue. That proved a golden marketing opportunity for Warner Brothers to attract interest in the film by noting it made a major film critic change his mind about its virtues. From 1983 to 1988 he wrote a column for the Los Angeles Herald Examiner.

Morgenstern's writings have appeared in CNBC The New Yorker, The New York Times Magazine, Rolling Stone, Esquire, the Columbia Journalism Review and the Los Angeles Times Magazine. He was a co-founder of the National Society of Film Critics.

Morgenstern has also worked in screenwriting. He co-wrote the 1976 television film The Boy in the Plastic Bubble, and worked on several episodes of Law & Order.

Morgenstern began writing reviews for The Wall Street Journal in May 1995. His movie reviews appeared each Friday in the "Weekend & Leisure" section of the newspaper, and he covered the movie industry in a column which appeared every other Saturday. He received the Pulitzer Prize for Criticism in 2005, becoming the third film critic to win a Pulitzer for criticism, after Roger Ebert of the Chicago Sun-Times and Stephen Hunter of The Washington Post. In 2022, Morgenstern retired from The Wall Street Journal, with his final column running in print on April 29, two days short of his 27th anniversary with the newspaper. During this time, he also contributed reviews for the Los Angeles-area radio station KCRW. His final reviews for The Wall Street Journal were for the films Petite Maman, The Duke, and The Northman, all published on April 21.

== Personal life ==
Morgenstern was born in New York City, and graduated from Lehigh University in 1953. He was married to actress Piper Laurie from 1962 until their divorce in 1982; they adopted one daughter. Morgenstern lives in Santa Monica, California as of 2015.
