= Robin Givhan =

American fashion editor (born 1964)

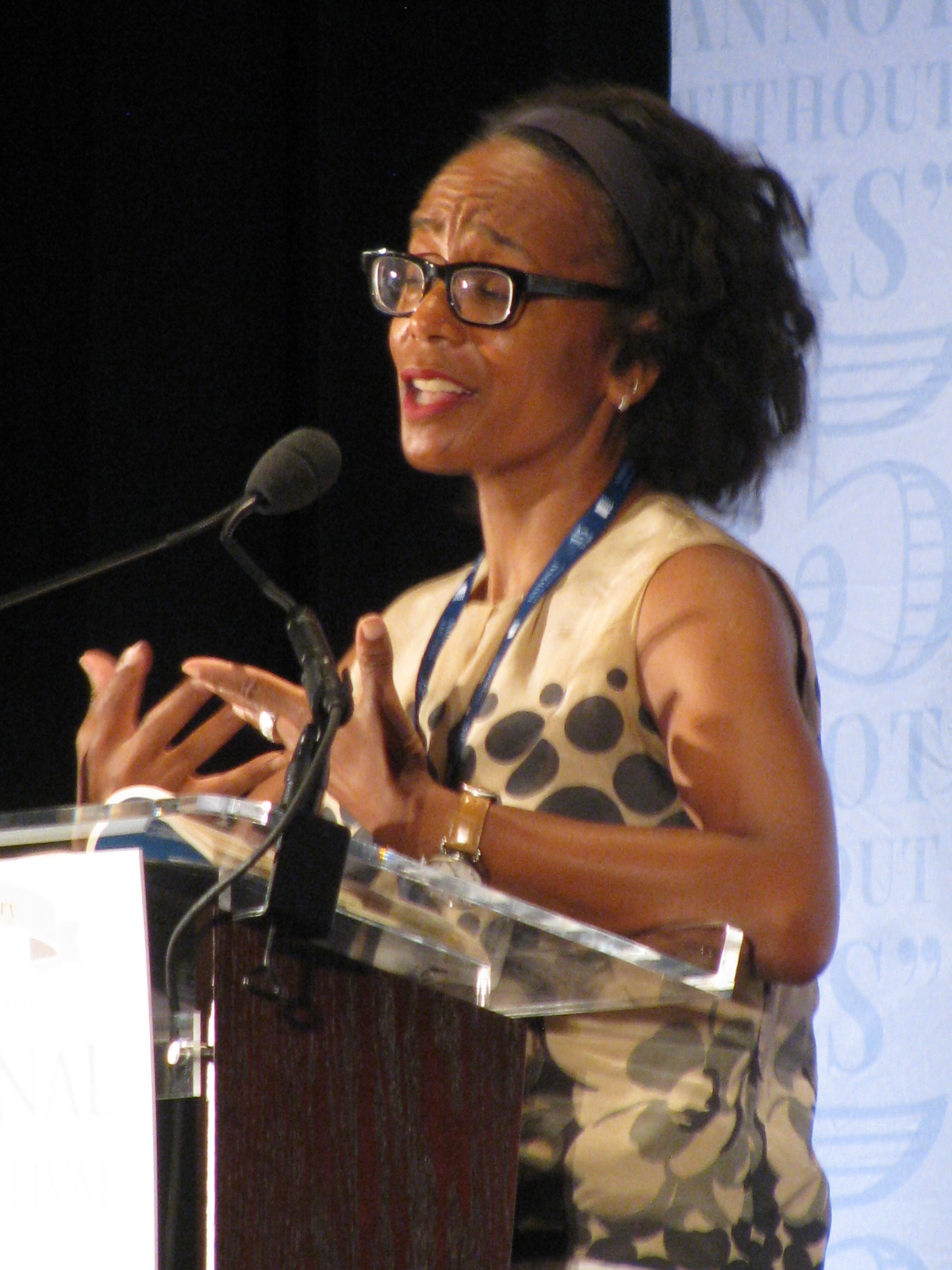
- Givhan speaks at the 2015 National Book Festival
- Born: September 11, 1964 (age 61)
- Occupation: Journalist
- Education: Princeton University (BA); University of Michigan (MA)
- Notable awards: Pulitzer Prize for Criticism

Robin Givhan (born September 11, 1964) is an American fashion editor and Pulitzer Prize winning writer.

Givhan was a fashion editor for The Washington Post. She joined the Post in 1995, and left in 2010 to become the fashion critic and fashion correspondent for The Daily Beast and Newsweek. She returned to the Post in 2014.

Givhan won the Pulitzer Prize for Criticism in 2006, the first time the award was given to a fashion writer. The Pulitzer Committee cited Givhan's "witty, closely observed essays that transform fashion criticism into cultural criticism."

== Background ==
Givhan is a native of Detroit, Michigan. She was the valedictorian at Renaissance High School in 1982, graduated from Princeton University in 1986, and holds a master's degree in journalism from the University of Michigan, Ann Arbor.

After working for the Detroit Free Press for about seven years, she held positions at the San Francisco Chronicle and Vogue magazine.

In 2009 she moved from New York City to Washington, D.C., where her fashion beat was expanded to cover First Lady Michelle Obama.

== Opinions ==
Givhan generated an uproar on July 20, 2007, when she penned a Washington Post opinion piece that drew attention to an outfit worn by presidential candidate Hillary Clinton during her July 18 speech on the Senate floor. Givhan said Sen. Clinton's slightly V-shaped neckline was "unnerving" and "startling," especially for a woman "who has been so publicly ambivalent about style, image and the burdens of both." She added, "[I]t was more like catching a man with his fly unzipped. Just look away!"

Givhan has made a reputation for being blunt. In an interview on writers who cover the fashion industry, Givhan told CBS News, "There are a lot of people who sort of say that something is good or important or progressive or edgy when in fact, it's just crappy. And no one will just say it's crappy." She added, "I'll also say when I think something is absolutely magnificent."

Commenting on a heavy, dark-green parka worn by Vice President Dick Cheney at a ceremony in 2005 commemorating the 60th anniversary of the liberation of Auschwitz, Givhan wrote, "It's the kind of attire one typically wears to operate a snow blower.... Here he was wearing something that visually didn't symbolize to me the level of solemnity and respect that I thought a service like this demanded... He was representing the American people. I don't want to be represented by someone in, you know, a parka who looks like he's at a Green Bay Packer game."

She also slammed the attire worn by the wife and young children of Supreme Court nominee John Roberts during his swearing in as Supreme Court Chief Justice, saying they resembled "a trio of Easter eggs, a handful of jelly bellies, three little Necco wafers."

In August 2009, she criticized First Lady Michelle Obama for wearing shorts while on a family vacation. "Avoiding the appearance of queenly behavior is politically wise. But it does American culture no favors if a first lady tries so hard to be average that she winds up looking common," wrote Givhan on the subject of the first lady's attire. Givhan continued her criticism in the Washington Post of January 3, 2010, complaining the First Lady lacked "focus" in her advocacy.

== Recognition and publications ==
In 2013, Robin Givhan was inducted into the University of Michigan's Detroiter Hall of Fame. Givhan's book about The Battle of Versailles Fashion Show, entitled The Battle of Versailles: The Night American Fashion Stumbled into the Spotlight and Made History, was published by Flatiron Books in 2015.

She has also contributed to a number of books, including captions for photographer Lucian Perkins's book Runway Madness and a commemorative book entitled Michelle: Her First Year as First Lady.

== Awards ==
- 2006 Pulitzer Prize for Criticism
