= James L. Greenfield =

American journalist and government official (1924–2024)

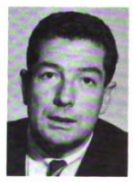

10th Assistant Secretary of State for Public Affairs
- In office September 10, 1964 – March 12, 1966
- President: Lyndon B. Johnson
- Preceded by: Robert Manning
- Succeeded by: Dixon Donnelley

Personal details
- Born: July 16, 1924 Cleveland, Ohio, U.S.
- Died: May 19, 2024 (aged 99) Washington, Connecticut, U.S.
- Spouse(s): Margaret Ann Schwertley (m. 1954; died 1999) Ene Riisna
- Education: Harvard College
- Occupation: Author, editor, journalist

James Lloyd Greenfield (July 16, 1924 – May 19, 2024) was an American journalist and government official. He served as the United States deputy Assistant Secretary of State for Public Affairs from 1962 to 1964, and then United States Assistant Secretary of State for Public Affairs from 1964 to 1966. Latterly Greenfield worked in media, and was one of the editors of the New York Times who decided to publish the Pentagon Papers in 1971.

== Early life and education ==
James Lloyd Greenfield was born on July 16, 1924 in Cleveland. He attended high school at Cleveland Heights High School, graduating in 1942. He then went on to receive a B.A. from Harvard College.

== Career ==
After college, Greenfield became a foreign correspondent for Time, with postings in Asia, Europe and Washington. He rose to become Time's chief diplomatic correspondent.

Greenfield joined the United States Department of State during the Kennedy administration as Deputy Assistant Secretary of State for Public Affairs. He would serve in this position from 1962 to 1964. In 1964, President of the United States Lyndon Johnson promoted Greenfield to Assistant Secretary of State for Public Affairs and Greenfield held this office from September 10, 1964, until March 12, 1966.

After leaving the administration, Greenfield became Vice President of Continental Airlines, then headed by the famous Robert Six, and founded Air Micronesia for Continental which gave the airline a route to Asia. He also worked as News Director of WINS-NY radio station where he set up 24-hour news for the station's pioneering all-news programming.

Greenfield joined the New York Times in 1967 as assistant metropolitan editor. He was a protege of A.M. Rosenthal, who even attempted to get Greenfield named as the Times bureau chief in 1968. After failing to become bureau chief, Greenfield briefly resigned from the Times and joined Westinghouse Broadcasting as a vice president. However, he would be rehired by the Times the next year. From 1969 to 1977, he was the Times' foreign news editor, and was the project editor during the publication of the Pentagon Papers, even briefly hiding them in his apartment between organizing sessions in Washington and New York, for which the New York Times won the Pulitzer Prize for Public Service. He became an assistant managing editor in 1977. In 1987, the New York Times announced that Greenfield would become editor of The New York Times Magazine, while remaining an assistant managing editor of the Times. In 1991, Greenfield stepped down as assistant managing editor, though he remained a consulting member of the editorial board.

Greenfield was a founder of The Independent Journalism Foundation (IJF) and served in a volunteer capacity as its President from its founding in 1991. IJF is a nonprofit organization that operates centers and related training programs for the media in Eastern Europe and Southeast Asia.

== Personal life ==
In the early 1950s, while posted in Hong Kong for Time, Greenfield met his future first wife, Margaret Ann Schwertley (December 23, 1924 – December 8, 1999), who was a Pan Am stewardess based out of Hong Kong; the couple wed in 1954. Beginning in the 1950s, she was an art and antiques dealer in London, Washington D.C., and finally New York, where until 1998 she owned and ran Marco Polo, a store located on Madison Avenue between E. 84th and E. 85th Streets in Manhattan. The couple lived on the Upper East Side of Manhattan, and Greenfield and his wife also developed brownstone houses.

Greenfield later married Ene Riisna, an Emmy Award-winning former producer for ABC Television's 20/20. He died from kidney failure in Washington, Connecticut, on May 19, 2024, at the age of 99.

Government offices
Preceded by Robert Manning	Assistant Secretary of State for Public Affairs; September 10, 1964 – March 12, 1966	Succeeded by Dixon Donnelley
