= William McPherson (writer) =

American writer

- Born: March 16, 1933; Sault Sainte Marie, Michigan, U.S.
- Died: March 28, 2017 (aged 84); Washington, DC, U.S.
- Education: University of Michigan; Michigan State University; George Washington University
- Occupations: Writer, journalist
- Writing career
- Genres: Journalism, non-fiction, fiction

William McPherson (March 16, 1933 – March 28, 2017) was an American writer and journalist. He is the author of two novels, Testing the Current and To the Sargasso Sea, and many articles, essays, and book reviews. McPherson was awarded the Pulitzer Prize for Distinguished Criticism in 1977.

== Life ==
William Alexander McPherson was born in Sault Sainte Marie, Michigan, the third son of Harold Agnew McPherson, an executive of Union Carbide Corporation, and of his wife Ruth Brubaker. He lived in Washington, D.C., and New York City for most of his life and spent several years in Romania. He attended the University of Michigan (1951–1955), Michigan State University (1956–1958) and George Washington University (1960–1962) without taking a degree. In 1959, he married Elizabeth Mosher, with whom he had a daughter, Jane, in 1963. In 1979, McPherson and Mosher divorced.

== Career ==
In 1958, McPherson began his professional career as a copy boy for the Washington Post, becoming a staff writer a few months later. He remained at the Post until 1966, when he became a senior editor at William Morrow & Company in New York. Three years later, at the behest of Ben Bradlee, executive editor of the Washington Post, McPherson returned to the Post, first as daily book editor and then, when the Sunday Book World came under the sole ownership of the Washington Post, as Book World's first editor, a post he held from 1972 to 1978. He later moved to the editorial page where he wrote a weekly op-ed column, selected the letters to the editor, and was a member of the editorial board. Before and after leaving the Post in 1987, he worked as a freelance writer and journalist, taught writing and criticism at American University in Washington, D.C., and lectured at various colleges and universities in the United States and abroad, including Columbia University, the University of Oklahoma, and the Radcliffe Publishing Course.

McPherson's first novel, Testing the Current, was published in 1984 to wide acclaim. Russell Banks wrote in the New York Times Book Review, "William McPherson's first novel is an extraordinarily intelligent, powerful and, I believe, permanent contribution to the literature of family, childhood and memory." The New York Times named Testing the Current one of 1984's "Notable Books of the Year". McPherson's second novel, To the Sargasso Sea, explores the adult life of the first novel's child protagonist. New York Review Books Classics republished Testing the Current in January 2013.

McPherson moved to Romania shortly after the execution of communist dictator Nicolae Ceauşescu and spent most of the next seven years exploring and writing about Romania for Granta, the Wilson Quarterly, the Washington Post, and Slate. McPherson also contributed to The New Republic, The Nation, The New Yorker, the International Herald Tribune, and Life, among other periodicals.

In 2014, McPherson wrote about how he was living in relative poverty, after spending his inheritances and losing money in the stock market.

McPherson died March 28, 2017, at a hospice center in Washington of complications from congestive heart failure and pneumonia.

== Selected bibliography ==
- Testing the Current. Simon & Schuster. 1984. ISBN 0-671-25251-8.;
- Testing the Current. New York Review Books Classics. 2012. ISBN 978-0-671-25251-9.
- To the Sargasso Sea. Simon & Schuster. 1987. ISBN 978-0-671-66030-7.
- The Best of Granta Reportage (Bill Buford, editor, 1993)
- The Best of Granta (Ian Jack, editor, 1998)

== Work Online ==
- "Today in Bucharest". The Washington Post. June 21, 1990. Archived from the original on November 16, 2018 – via HighBeam Research.
- "The Transylvania Tangle," an essay in The Wilson Quarterly, Winter 1994
- "A Weeklong Electronic Journal," a series in Slate, May 1997
- "A Balkan Comedy," an essay in The Wilson Quarterly, Summer 1997
- "Falling" an essay in The Hedgehog Review, Fall 2014
