= Mark Feeney =

American journalist (born 1957)

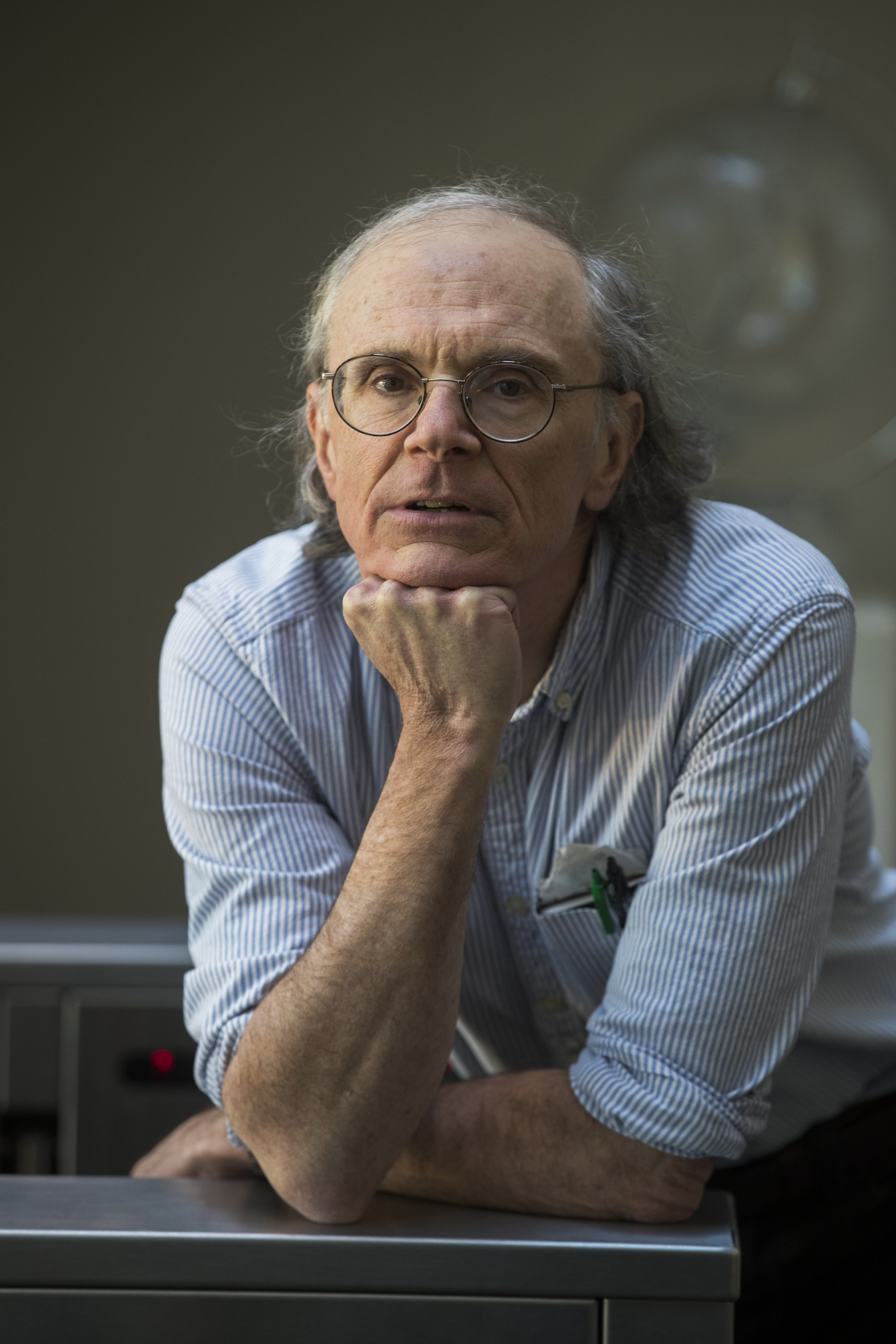
- Born: July 28, 1957 (age 69); Winchester, Massachusetts, U.S.
- Education: Harvard University (AB)
- Occupations: Arts writer, author
- Employer: The Boston Globe
- Awards: Pulitzer Prize for Criticism

Mark Feeney (born July 28, 1957) is an author and arts writer for The Boston Globe for over four decades. He is the author of two books, Nixon at the Movies (2004) and Nixon and the Silver Screen (2012). Feeney is a native of Cambridge, Massachusetts.

== Life and work ==
Feeney graduated from Harvard in 1979 with a magna cum laude degree in History and Literature. He has worked for the Globe since then, as a researcher, reporter, reviewer, editor and staff writer at The Boston Globe Magazine.

He has taught at Yale (2010), Brandeis, Princeton (2007), and Brown (2014) universities. During spring 2014 he was an Institute for the Liberal Arts journalism fellow at Boston College.

A finalist for the 1994 Pulitzer Prize for Feature Writing, he won the 2008 Pulitzer Prize for Criticism for his "penetrating and versatile command of the visual arts, from film and photography to painting." In 2009, he was a Foster Distinguished Writer at Penn State University. In 2010, he delivered the Clarice Smith Distinguished Lecture in American Art at the Smithsonian American Art Museum.

== Awards and recognition ==
- 1994 Finalist, Pulitzer Prize for Feature Writing, for his profile of President Nixon
- 2010 Alan Miller Fund Visiting Journalist, University of Maine at Orono
- 2010 Clarice Smith Distinguished Lecturer in American Art, Smithsonian American Art Museum
- 2009 Foster Distinguished Writer, Pennsylvania State University
- 2008 Pulitzer Prize for Criticism for his command of the visual arts

== Publications ==
- Nixon at the Movies. Chicago, IL: University of Chicago Press, 2004. ISBN 978-0226239682.
- Nixon and the Silver Screen. Chicago, IL: University of Chicago Press, 2013. ISBN 978-0226049236.
