= Caroline Knapp =

American writer and columnist

- Born: November 8, 1959
- Died: June 3/4, 2002
- Writing career
- Notable work: Drinking: A Love Story

Caroline Knapp (November 8, 1959 – June 3/4, 2002) was an American writer and columnist whose candid best-selling memoir Drinking: A Love Story recounted her 20-year battle with alcoholism.

== Life and career ==
Knapp grew up in Cambridge, Massachusetts and graduated from Brown University. She was the daughter of noted psychiatrist Peter H. Knapp, who was a researcher of psychosomatic medicine. From 1988 to 1995, she was a columnist for the Boston Phoenix where her column "Out There" often featured the fictional "Alice K." In 1994, those columns were collected in her first book, Alice K's Guide to Life: One Woman's Quest for Survival, Sanity, and the Perfect New Shoes.

Knapp won wide acclaim for Drinking: A Love Story (1996) that described her life as a "high-functioning alcoholic" and remained on The New York Times Best Seller List for several weeks. She followed Drinking with Pack of Two, also a best-seller, which recounted her relationship with her dog Lucille and humans' relationships with dogs in general.

In May 2002, she married her longtime friend and companion, photographer Mark Morelli.

== Death ==
Knapp died in Cambridge of lung cancer on June 3, 2002. Two books of hers were published after her death: Appetites: Why Women Want, which described Knapp's experience with anorexia and other women's struggles with addictions, and The Merry Recluse, a collection of essays.

Gail Caldwell’s Let's Take the Long Way Home (2010), is a memoir of her friendship with Knapp.

== Selected bibliography ==
- Alice K's Guide to Life: One Woman's Quest for Survival, Sanity, and the Perfect New Shoes (1994)
- Drinking: A Love Story (1996)
- Pack of Two: The Intricate Bond Between People and Dogs (1998)
- Appetites: Why Women Want (published posthumously, 2003)
- The Merry Recluse: A Life in Essays (published posthumously, 2004)
