= Ene Riisna =

Estonian-American news producer (born 1938)

- Born: July 27, 1938 (age 87); Tallinn, Estonia
- Occupation: Television producer

Ene Riisna (born 27 July 1938) is an Estonian-born American television producer, known for her work on the American news show 20/20.

== Early life and education ==
Ene Riisna was born in Tallinn, Estonia, to politician Eduard Riisna and his wife Olga. Her family fled to Sweden in September 1944 when the Soviets occupied Estonia.

Riisna earned an Honors degree in English Language and Literature from the University of Toronto, University College. She briefly worked, successfully, as a fashion model in Toronto and London, England, then returned to Toronto and became a producer-director for Canadian Broadcasting Corporation in Toronto, then a freelancer for the BBC in London.

== Broadcasting ==
In 1970, Riisna's first job in network television in America was the executive producer of a new morning program, "Woman", for the CBS station in New York. The appointment made her one of the first women to create and produce a television news program. Later she produced documentaries for NBC and PBS and wrote magazine articles including for MS magazine.

Riisna became a producer of the well-known news show 20/20 at ABC News. Over the course of the next two decades she produced a series of Emmy Award winning stories, many Barbara Walter’s high profile interviews (Margaret Thatcher, Boris Yeltsen, Nancy Reagan, Barbra Streisand and others.) For her work she was awarded over a dozen major awards including two Emmys, a Television Academy General Achievement Award, and Columbia School of Journalism's prestigious Dupont Award. Her subjects included an investigation of the effects of the use Agent Orange in Vietnam and the story of the Zumwalt family.

Riisna also produced and directed documentary films for ABC News with anchor Peter Jennings as host.

After retiring from 20/20, Riisna worked with her husband James L. Greenfield who headed the Independent Journalism Foundation, which he created in 1990 for the study of journalism, with centers throughout Eastern Europe, Vietnam and Cambodia. Currently, she serves on the boards of the Turquoise Mountain Foundation and the George and Nora London Foundation for Singers.
