= Sarah Kaufman (critic) =

American journalist

Sarah Kaufman (born 1963) is an American author who was the dance critic for the Washington Post. She was the recipient of the 2010 Pulitzer Prize for Criticism. Her most recent work, The Art of Grace, was published by W.W. Norton and Company in fall of 2015.

== Biography ==
Kaufman was born in Austin, Texas, and was raised in Washington DC. She earned a BA in English from the University of Maryland, where she studied under poet laureate Reed Whittemore. She graduated in 1988 with a master's degree from the Medill School of Journalism at Northwestern University.

Kaufman studied dance until she gave it up in graduate school. She broke into journalism when she complained to the Washington City Paper that they lacked dance reviews and then began writing reviews for that publication. In the 1990s, Kaufman and her husband moved to Munich, Germany, where she worked as a translator and author of freelance English-language cultural and journalism pieces.

Upon their return to the US, Kaufman began freelancing for the Post. When Post dance critic and Pulitzer-winner Alan M. Kriegsman, whom Kaufman calls "my hero, friend and mentor", retired in 1996, Kaufman took over as dance critic. While writing for the Post, she broke the story that many of the works of Martha Graham were in the public domain. She also won a Missouri Lifestyle Journalism Award for Arts and Entertainment Reporting for her report on the decreasing number of ballet offerings at the John F. Kennedy Center for the Performing Arts.

She was laid off in 2022.
