= Pulitzer Prize for Criticism =

American journalism award

The Pulitzer Prize for Criticism has been presented since 1970 to a writer in the United States who has demonstrated "distinguished criticism, using any available journalistic tool." Recipients of the award are chosen by an independent board and officially administered by Columbia University. The Pulitzer Committee issues an official citation explaining the reasons for the award.

== Winners and citations ==
The Criticism Pulitzer has been awarded to one person annually except in 1992 when it was not awarded—43 prizes in 44 years 1970–2013. Wesley Morris is the only person to have won the prize more than once, winning in 2012 and 2021.

== 1970s ==
Year	Name(s)	Publication	Rationale
1970	Ada Louise Huxtable	The New York Times	"for distinguished criticism during 1969."
1971	Harold C. Schonberg	The New York Times	"for his music criticism during 1970."
1972	Frank Peters Jr.	St. Louis Post-Dispatch	"for his music criticism during 1971."
1973	Ron Powers	Chicago Sun-Times	"for his critical writing about television during 1972."
1974	Emily Genauer	Newsday	"for her critical writing about art and artists."
1975	Roger Ebert	Chicago Sun-Times	"for his film criticism during 1974."
1976	Alan M. Kriegsman	The Washington Post	"for his critical writing about dance during 1975."
1977	William McPherson	The Washington Post	"for his contribution to 'Book World.'"
1978	Walter Kerr	The New York Times	"for articles on the theater in 1977 and throughout his long career."
1979	Paul Gapp	Chicago Tribune	

== 1980s ==
Year	Name(s)	Publication	Rationale
1980	William A. Henry III	The Boston Globe	"for critical writing about television."
1980	William Glackin	The Sacramento Bee	
1980	William Robertson	Miami Herald	
1981	Jonathan Yardley	The Washington Star	"for his book reviews."
1981	Henry Kisor	Chicago Sun-Times	
1981	Allan Temko	San Francisco Chronicle	
1982	Martin Bernheimer	Los Angeles Times	"for classical music criticism."
1982	Donal Henahan	The New York Times	"for music criticism."
1982	Marvin Kitman	Newsday	"for television criticism."
1983	Manuela Hoelterhoff	The Wall Street Journal	"for her wide-ranging criticism on the arts and other subjects."
1983	Beth Dunlop	Miami Herald	"for architectural criticism."
1983	Stephen Schiff	Boston Phoenix	"for film criticism."
1984	Paul Goldberger	The New York Times	"for architectural criticism."
1984	Dan Cryer	Newsday	"for his book reviews."
1984	Ken Tucker	The Philadelphia Inquirer	"for pop music criticism."
1985	Howard Rosenberg	Los Angeles Times	"for his television criticism."
1985	James Chute	Milwaukee Journal Sentinel	"for his classical music criticism."
1985	Margaret Manning	The Boston Globe	"for her book reviews."
1986	Donal Henahan	The New York Times	"for his music criticism."
1986	Richard Christiansen	Chicago Tribune	"for his theater criticism."
1986	Richard Eder	Los Angeles Times	"for his book reviews."
1987	Richard Eder	Los Angeles Times	"for his book reviews."
1987	Frank Rich	The New York Times	"for his theater criticism."
1987	Andrew Sarris	The Village Voice	"for his film criticism."
1988	Tom Shales	The Washington Post	"for his television criticism."
1988	Michael Skube	The News and Observer	"for his book reviews."
1988	Allan Temko	San Francisco Chronicle	"for his architecture criticism."
1989	Michael Skube	The News and Observer	"for his writing about books and other literary topics."
1989	Joyce Millman	San Francisco Examiner	"for her criticism of television and other subjects."
1989	David Richards	The Washington Post	"for his theater criticism."

== 1990s ==
Year	Name(s)	Publication	Rationale
1990	Allan Temko	San Francisco Chronicle	"for his architecture criticism."
1990	Jory Farr	The Press-Enterprise	"for his pop music criticism."
1990	Wayne Lee Gay	Fort Worth Star-Telegram	"for his critical coverage of the 1989 Van Cliburn International Piano Competition."
1991	David Shaw	Los Angeles Times	"for his critiques of the way in which the media, including his own paper, reported the McMartin preschool trial."
1991	Christopher Knight	Los Angeles Times	"for his columns on art and artists."
1991	Joyce Millman	San Francisco Examiner	"for her television criticism."
1991	Leslie Savan	The Village Voice	"for perceptive articles critiquing various forms of advertising."
1992	No award.		
1992	Michael Feingold	The Village Voice	"for his theater reviews."
1992	Itabari Njeri	Los Angeles Times	"for her essay on race and the messages of black nationalism."
1992	Leslie Savan	The Village Voice	"for her critical columns on advertising and the media."
1993	Michael Dirda	The Washington Post	"for his book reviews."
1993	Gail Caldwell	The Boston Globe	"for her literary and social criticism."
1993	Leonard Pitts	Miami Herald	"for critical articles on popular music and culture."
1994	Lloyd Schwartz	Boston Phoenix	"for his skillful and resonant classical music criticism."
1994	Henry Allen	The Washington Post	"for his imaginative and varied cultural criticism."
1994	Matt Zoller Seitz	Dallas Observer	"for his lucid and insightful film criticism."
1995	Margo Jefferson	The New York Times	"for her book reviews and other cultural criticism."
1995	Stephen Hunter	The Baltimore Sun	"for his film criticism."
1995	Dorothy Rabinowitz	The Wall Street Journal	"for her writing about television."
1996	Robert Campbell	The Boston Globe	"for his knowledgeable writing on architecture."
1996	Gail Caldwell	The Boston Globe	"for her insightful reviews and comments on books and the literary scene."
1996	Stephen Hunter	The Baltimore Sun	"for his distinguished film criticism."
1997	Tim Page	The Washington Post	"for his lucid and illuminating music criticism."
1997	Herbert Muschamp	The New York Times	"for his criticism of architecture in America, written with devotion to the art, penetrating analysis and literate style."
1997	Leslie Savan	The Village Voice	"for her analytical columns about the forces at work behind advertising and consumerism, particularly on television."
1998	Michiko Kakutani	The New York Times	"for her passionate, intelligent writing on books and contemporary literature."
1998	Dorothy Rabinowitz	The Wall Street Journal	"for her tough-minded, critical columns on television and its place in politics and culture."
1998	Peter Rainer	New Times Los Angeles	"for his versatile and perceptive writing about film."
1999	Blair Kamin	Chicago Tribune	"for his lucid coverage of city architecture, including an influential series supporting the development of Chicago's lakefront area."
1999	Henry Allen	The Washington Post	"for his illuminating criticism of photography and painting."
1999	Gail Caldwell	The Boston Globe	"for her compelling observations on books and popular culture."
1999	Justin Davidson	Newsday	"for his fresh and vivid writing on classical music and its makers."

== 2000s ==
Year	Name(s)	Publication	Rationale
2000	Henry Allen	The Washington Post	"for his fresh and authoritative writing on photography."
2000	Michael Kimmelman	The New York Times	"for his gracefully-written observations on art and artists."
2000	Andrew Sarris	The New York Observer	"for his informed and enlightening film criticism."
2001	Gail Caldwell	The Boston Globe	"for her insightful observations on contemporary life and literature."
2001	Christopher Knight	Los Angeles Times	"for his passionate and public-minded art criticism."
2001	Jerry Saltz	The Village Voice	"for his fresh and engaging views on contemporary art."
2002	Justin Davidson	Newsday	"for his crisp coverage of classical music that captures its essence."
2002	John King	San Francisco Chronicle	"for his forcefully-expressed and engaging essays illustrating the role that architecture and urban design plays in the life of his city."
2002	Joe Morgenstern	The Wall Street Journal	"for his witty and commanding criticism of contemporary films."
2003	Stephen Hunter	The Washington Post	"for his authoritative film criticism that is both intellectually rewarding and a pleasure to read."
2003	John King	San Francisco Chronicle	"for his perceptive, passionate criticism of architecture and urban design and their impact on life in his city."
2003	Nicolai Ouroussoff	Los Angeles Times	"for his commanding reviews and essays on architectural development and preservation in an ever-evolving city."
2004	Dan Neil	Los Angeles Times	"for his one-of-a-kind reviews of automobiles, blending technical expertise with offbeat humor and astute cultural observations."
2004	Nicolai Ouroussoff	Los Angeles Times	"for his versatile architectural criticism that stretched from his hometown's new Disney Hall to the rubble in Baghdad, where he pondered the ancient city's resurrection."
2004	Inga Saffron	The Philadelphia Inquirer	"for her passionate and insightful architectural criticism that, through clear, elegant writing, was as accessible to the ordinary reader as it was to the expert."
2005	Joe Morgenstern	The Wall Street Journal	"for his reviews that elucidated the strengths and weaknesses of film with rare insight, authority and wit."
2005	Frank Rich	The New York Times	"for boldly exploring the influence of popular culture on American politics and society."
2005	Carlin Romano	The Chronicle of Higher Education	"for bringing new vitality to the classic essay across a formidable array of topics."
2006	Robin Givhan	The Washington Post	"for her witty, closely observed essays that transform fashion criticism into cultural criticism."
2006	Nicolai Ouroussoff	The New York Times	"for his graceful, contemplative and wide ranging critiques of architecture and urban design from New Orleans to Berlin."
2006	Jerry Saltz	The Village Voice	"for his fresh, down-to-earth pieces on the visual arts and other cultural topics."
2007	Jonathan Gold	LA Weekly	"for his zestful, wide ranging restaurant reviews, expressing the delight of an erudite eater."
2007	Christopher Knight	Los Angeles Times	"for his pieces on art that reflect meticulous reporting, aesthetic judgment and authoritative voice."
2007	Mark Swed	Los Angeles Times	"for his passionate music criticism, marked by resonant writing and an ability to give life to the people behind a performance."
2008	Mark Feeney	The Boston Globe	"for his penetrating and versatile command of the visual arts, from film and photography to painting."
2008	Ann Hornaday	The Washington Post	"for her perceptive movie reviews and essays, reflecting solid research and an easy, engaging style."
2008	Inga Saffron	The Philadelphia Inquirer	"for her forceful critiques that illuminate the vital interplay between architecture and the life of her city."
2009	Holland Cotter	The New York Times	"for his wide ranging reviews of art, from Manhattan to China, marked by acute observation, luminous writing and dramatic storytelling."
2009	Inga Saffron	The Philadelphia Inquirer	"for her fascinating and convincing architectural critiques that boldly confront important topics, from urban planning issues to the newest skyscraper."
2009	Sebastian Smee	The Boston Globe	"for his fresh, accessible and energetic reviews on the New England art scene, creating for readers a sense of discovery even as he provides discerning analysis."

== 2010s ==
Year	Name(s)	Publication	Rationale
2010	Sarah Kaufman	The Washington Post	"for her refreshingly imaginative approach to dance criticism, illuminating a range of issues and topics with provocative comments and original insights."
2010	Michael Feingold	The Village Voice	"for his engaging, authoritative drama reviews that fuse passion and knowledge as he helps readers understand what makes a play or a performance successful."
2010	A. O. Scott	The New York Times	"for his incisive film reviews that, with aplomb, embrace a wide spectrum of movies and often explore their connection to larger issues in society or the arts."
2011	Sebastian Smee	The Boston Globe	"for his vivid and exuberant writing about art, often bringing great works to life with love and appreciation."
2011	Jonathan Gold	LA Weekly	"for his delightful, authoritative restaurant reviews, escorting readers through a city's diverse food culture."
2011	Nicolai Ouroussoff	The New York Times	"for his well honed architectural criticism, highlighted by ambitious essays on the burst of architectural projects in oil-rich Middle East countries.""
2012	Wesley Morris	The Boston Globe	"for his smart, inventive film criticism, distinguished by pinpoint prose and an easy traverse between the art house and the big-screen box office."
2012	Philip Kennicott	The Washington Post	"for his ambitious and insightful cultural criticism, taking on topical events from the uprisings in Egypt to the dedication of the Ground Zero memorial."
2012	Tobi Tobias	ArtsJournal.com	"for work that reveals passion as well as deep historical knowledge of dance, her well-expressed arguments coming from the heart as well as the head."
2013	Philip Kennicott	The Washington Post	"for his eloquent and passionate essays on art and the social forces that underlie it, a critic who always strives to make his topics and targets relevant to readers."
2013	Manohla Dargis	The New York Times	"for her enlightening movie criticism, vividly written and showing deep understanding of the business and art of filmmaking."
2013	Mary McNamara	Los Angeles Times	"for her searching television criticism that often becomes a springboard for provocative comments on the culture at large."
2014	Inga Saffron	The Philadelphia Inquirer	"for her criticism of architecture that blends expertise, civic passion and sheer readability into arguments that consistently stimulate and surprise."
2014	Jen Graves	The Stranger	"for her visual arts criticism that, with elegant and vivid description, informs readers about how to look at the complexities of contemporary art and the world in which it's made."
2014	Mary McNamara	Los Angeles Times	"for her trenchant and witty television criticism, engaging readers through essays and reviews that feature a conversational style and the force of fresh ideas."
2015	Mary McNamara	Los Angeles Times	"for savvy criticism that uses shrewdness, humor and an insider's view to show how both subtle and seismic shifts in the cultural landscape affect television."
2015	Manohla Dargis	The New York Times	"for film criticism that rises from a sweeping breadth of knowledge—social, cultural, cinematic—while always keeping the viewer front and center."
2015	Stephanie Zacharek	The Village Voice	"for film criticism that combines the pleasure of intellectual exuberance, the perspective of experience and the transporting power of good writing."
2016	Emily Nussbaum	The New Yorker	"for television reviews written with an affection that never blunts the shrewdness of her analysis or the easy authority of her writing."
2016	Hilton Als	The New Yorker	"for theater reviews written with such erudition and linguistic sensitivity that they often become larger than their subjects."
2016	Manohla Dargis	The New York Times	"for reviews and essays that take on the sacred cows of film culture with considerable style and admirable literary and historical reach."
2017	Hilton Als	The New Yorker	"for bold and original reviews that strove to put stage dramas within a real-world cultural context, particularly the shifting landscape of gender, sexuality and race."
2017	Ty Burr	The Boston Globe	"for a wide range of finely cut reviews of films and other cultural topics written with wit, deep sensibility and a refreshing lack of pretension."
2017	Laura Reiley	Tampa Bay Times	"for lively restaurant reviews, including a series that took on the false claims of the farm-to-table movement and prompted statewide investigations."
2018	Jerry Saltz	New York	"for a robust body of work that conveyed a canny and often daring perspective on visual art in America, encompassing the personal, the political, the pure and the profane."
2018	Manohla Dargis	The New York Times	"for writing, both downbeat and uplifting, that demonstrated the critic's sustained dedication to exposing male dominance in Hollywood and decrying the exploitation of women in the film business."
2018	Carlos Lozada	The Washington Post	"for criticism that dug deep into the books that have shaped political discourse—engaging seriously with scholarly works, partisan screeds and popular works of history and biography to produce columns and essays that plumbed the cultural and political genealogy of our current national divide."
2019	Carlos Lozada	The Washington Post	"for trenchant and searching reviews and essays that joined warm emotion and careful analysis in examining a broad range of books addressing government and the American experience."
2019	Manohla Dargis	The New York Times	"for authoritative film criticism that considered the impact of movies both inside the theater and in the wider world with rare passion, craftsmanship and insight."
2019	Jill Lepore	The New Yorker	"for critical, yet restrained, explorations of incredibly varied subjects, from Frankenstein to Ruth Bader Ginsburg, that combined literary nuance with intellectual rigor."

== 2020s ==
Year	Name(s)	Publication	Rationale
2020	Christopher Knight	Los Angeles Times	"for work demonstrating extraordinary community service by a critic, applying his expertise and enterprise to critique a proposed overhaul of the Los Angeles County Museum of Art and its effect on the institution's mission."
2020	Justin Davidson	New York	"for architecture reviews marked by a keen eye, deep knowledge and exquisite writing, as exemplified by his essay on Manhattan's Hudson Yards development."
2020	Soraya Nadia McDonald	The Undefeated	"for essays on theater and film that bring a fresh, delightful intelligence to the intersections of race and art."
2021	Wesley Morris	The New York Times	"for unrelentingly relevant and deeply engaged criticism on the intersection of race and culture in America, written in a singular style, alternately playful and profound."
2021	Craig Jenkins	New York	"for writing on a range of popular topics, including social media, music and comedy, contending with the year's disarray and exploring how culture and conversation can both flourish and break down online."
2021	Mark Swed	Los Angeles Times	"for a series of critical essays that broke through the silence of the pandemic to recommend an eclectic array of recordings as entertainment and solace essential to the moment, drawing deep connections to seven centuries of classical music."
2022	Salamishah Tillet	The New York Times	"for learned and stylish writing about Black stories in art and popular culture—work that successfully bridges academic and nonacademic critical discourse."
2022	Sophie Gilbert	The Atlantic	"for articles that bring clarity and insight to questions concerning gender norms, feminism, and popular culture."
2022	Peter Schjeldahl	The New Yorker	"for accessible and dedicated art criticism that introduces or revisits painters, institutions and movements, offering tender appreciations and unflinching dissents."
2023	Andrea Long Chu	New York	"for book reviews that scrutinize authors as well as their works, using multiple cultural lenses to explore some of society's most fraught topics."
2023	Jason Farago	The New York Times	"for art criticism, especially for taking a critical eye to the frontlines of Ukraine to explore the cultural dimensions of the war, including verifying damages to architecture and other sites and explaining Russia's efforts to erase the Ukrainian identity."
2023	Lyndsay Green	Detroit Free Press	"for rigorously reported coverage of restaurant openings and recommended dishes that also serve as an immersive cultural portrait of a vital American city."
2024	Justin Chang	Los Angeles Times	"for richly evocative and genre-spanning film criticism that reflects on the contemporary moviegoing experience."
2024	Vinson Cunningham	The New Yorker	"for theater reviews that reflect a formidable knowledge of the stage and the mechanics of performance along with canny observations on the human condition."
2024	Zadie Smith	The New York Review of Books	"for a review of the film Tár that addressed with wit and ease such consequential themes as mortality and the clash of generations."
2025	Alexandra Lange	CityLab	"for graceful and genre-expanding writing about public spaces for families, deftly using interviews, observations and analysis to consider the architectural components that allow children and communities to thrive."
2025	Vinson Cunningham	The New Yorker	"for illuminating and personal reviews of work that appears on television, streaming services or social media, trenchant criticism that explores contemporary issues and society."
2025	Sara Holdren	New York	"for insightful theater criticism that combines a reporter's eye and a historian's memory to inform readers about current stage productions."
2026	Mark Lamster	The Dallas Morning News	"for his rigorous and passionate architecture criticism, using wit and expertise to amplify his opinions and advocate for city residents."
2026	Vinson Cunningham	The New Yorker	"for sophisticated, accessible essays on the media, with an emphasis on television, that address shifts in culture, politics and American life with clear-eyed authority."
2026	Michael Lewis	The Wall Street Journal	"for informed and insightful writing about architecture that brings the inanimate to life and reflects a deep understanding that buildings are at once visual and civic spaces."
