= Journal of Consciousness Studies =

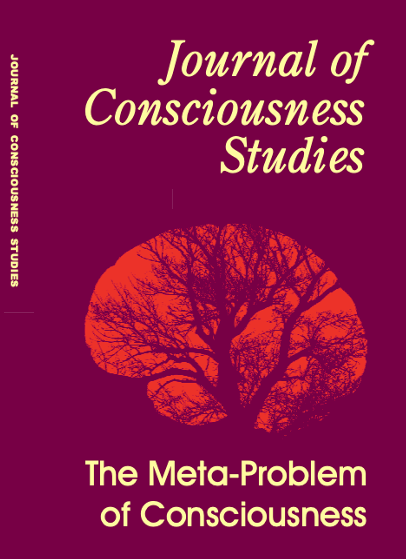
- Front cover of an issue of the Journal of Consciousness Studies
- Discipline: Cognitive science, neurophysiology, philosophy
- Language: English
- Edited by: Valerie G. Hardcastle

Publication details
- History: 1994–present
- Publisher: Imprint Academic
- Frequency: Bimonthly
- Open access: Hybrid
- Impact factor: .78 (2011)

Standard abbreviations
- ISO 4: J. Conscious. Stud.

Indexing
- ISSN: 1355-8250
- OCLC no.: 32043673

Links
- Journal homepage; Current Issue; Online access at Ingentaconnect

The Journal of Consciousness Studies is an interdisciplinary peer-reviewed academic journal dedicated entirely to the field of consciousness studies. It is published by Imprint Academic, and was founded in 1994. It was edited by Joseph Goguen from its founding date until 2006. It has since been edited by Professor Valerie Gray Hardcastle of the University of Cincinnati.

== Background ==
The journal was established in part to provide visibility across disciplines to various researchers approaching the problem of consciousness from their respective fields. The articles are usually in non-specialized language (in contrast to a typical academic journal) in order to make them accessible to those in other disciplines. This also serves to help make them accessible to laypersons.

In contrast to many other journals, it attempts to incorporate fields beyond the realm of the natural sciences and the social sciences such as the humanities, philosophy, critical theory, and comparative religion.

In 1995 biologist Jeffrey Grey, reviewing new journals in Nature, said that "there is no other journal quite like it, and one day we shall look back to its appearance as a defining moment".

== Content ==
From time to time, the journal publishes collections of thematically or topically related academic papers. These often take the form of a double issue. Recent issues of the Journal of Consciousness Studies cover topics such as animal consciousness, emotional consciousness, grief, indigenous philosophies of consciousness, and introspection.

Some examples of articles published in the journal:

- "Consciousness as an Engineering Issue" (1994) - Donald Michie
- "The Astonishing Hypothesis" (1994) - Francis Crick & J. Clark
- "Facing Up to the Problem of Consciousness" (1995) - David Chalmers
- "Realistic Monism: Why Physicalism Entails Panpsychism" (2006) - Galen Strawson
- "Illusionism as the Obvious Default Theory of Consciousness" (2016) - Daniel Dennett
- "The Meta Problem of Consciousness" (2018) - David Chalmers
- "The Real Problem(s) with Panpsychism" (2021) - Anil Seth
- "Is Consciousness Everywhere (Essays on Panpsychism)" - Philip Goff
- "Is the Sun Conscious?" (2021) - Rupert Sheldrake
- "What Forms Could Introspective Systems Take? A Research Programme" (2023) - Francois Kammerer and Keith Frankish.

The journal reports on conferences, notably the Toward a Science of Consciousness (TSC) conference, which is organized by the Center for Consciousness Studies based at the University of Arizona in Tucson. See, for example, TSC 2012.

Papers from the first Online Consciousness Conference were published in a special issue of JCS in April 2010.

== Abstracting and Indexing ==
The Journal of Consciousness Studies is abstracted in the Philosopher's Index, Social Sciences Research Index, ISI Alerting Services (Includes Research Alert), Current Contents, Arts and Humanities Research Index, Social and Behavioural Sciences, Arts & Humanities Citation Index, Social Scisearch and PsycINFO.
