= Georgetown University Law Center =

Private law school in Washington, D.C., US

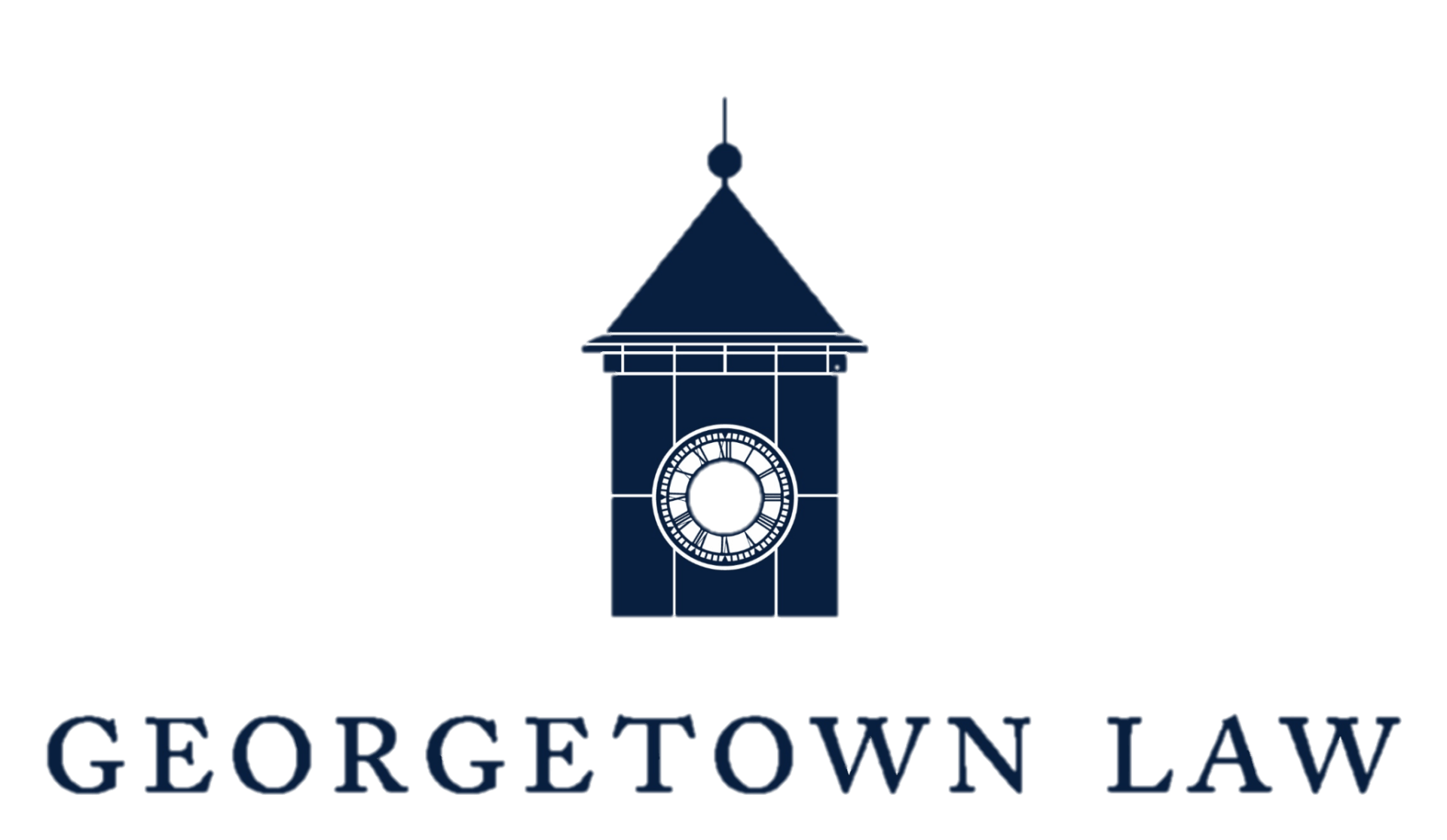
- Motto: Law is but the means — Justice is the end
- Parent school: Georgetown University
- Religious affiliation: Roman Catholic (Jesuit)
- Established: 1870; 156 years ago
- School type: Private law school
- Parent endowment: $3.7 billion (2024)
- Dean: Liz Magill
- Location: Washington, D.C., United States; 38°53′54″N 77°0′45″W
- Enrollment: 2,440: 1,982 JD, 441 LLM, 17 SJD
- Faculty: 285: 126 full-time, 159 part-time
- USNWR ranking: 18th (tie) (2026)
- Bar pass rate: 93.05% (2024 first-time takers)
- Website: www.law.georgetown.edu
- ABA profile: Standard 509 Report

Georgetown University Law Center, also known simply as Georgetown Law, is the law school of Georgetown University, a private research university in Washington, D.C., United States. It was established in 1870 and is the largest law school in the United States by enrollment, with over 2,000 students. It frequently receives the most full-time applications of any law school in the United States. Georgetown is considered part of the T14, an unofficial designation in the legal community of the best 14 law schools in the United States.

The school's campus is less than a mile from the U.S. Capitol Building and U.S. Supreme Court. Prominent alumni include members of the United States Congress, state governors, federal and state judges, billionaires, and diplomats.

== History ==
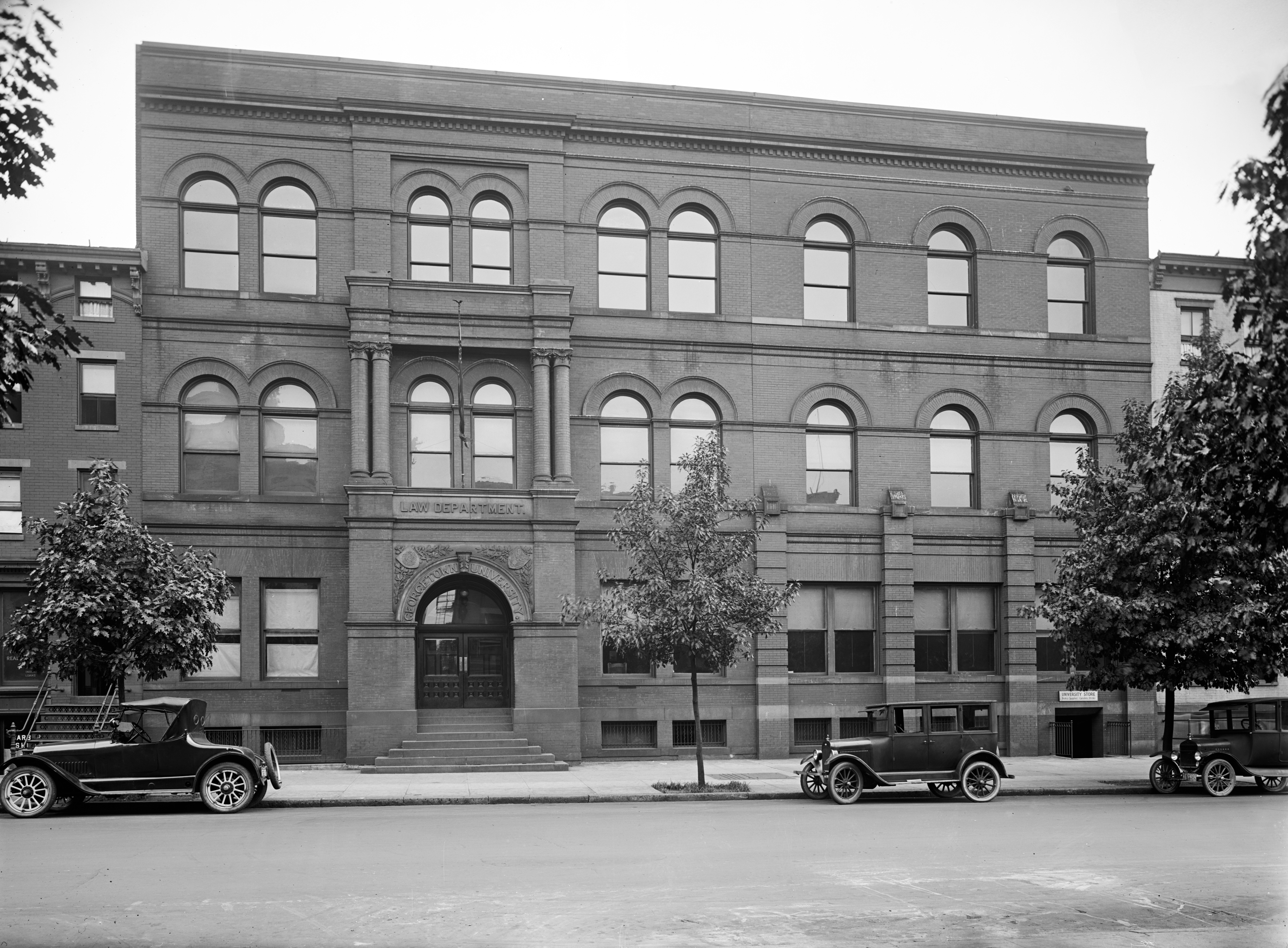
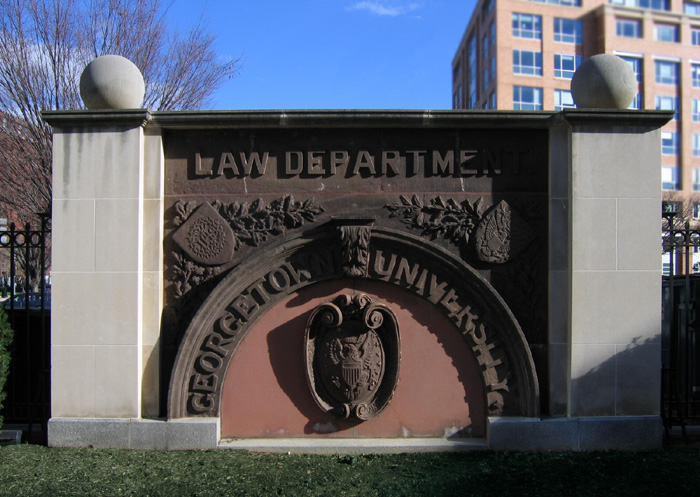
All that remains of Georgetown Law's original building in Judiciary Square (left) is the arch from above the doorway (right).

Opened as Georgetown Law School in 1870, Georgetown Law was the second (after St. Louis University) law school run by a Jesuit institution within the United States. Georgetown Law has been separate from the main Georgetown campus (in the neighborhood of Georgetown) since 1890, when it moved near what is now Chinatown.

The Law Center campus is located on New Jersey Avenue, within a mile from the Capitol, and a few blocks west of Washington Union Station. Georgetown Law School changed its name to Georgetown University Law Center in 1953. The school added the Edward Bennett Williams Law Library in 1989 and the Gewirz Student Center in 1993, providing on-campus living for the first time. The "Campus Completion Project" finished in 2004 with the addition of the Hotung International Building and the Sport and Fitness Center.

Georgetown Law's original wall (or sign) is preserved on the quad of the present-day campus.

In January 2022, Ilya Shapiro, the incoming executive director and senior lecturer of the Georgetown Center for the Constitution, wrote in a tweet that he opposed President Biden's intent to nominate a black woman to the Supreme Court, writing that because Biden would not nominate Shapiro's friend Sri Srinivasan, he was choosing a "lesser black woman". The dean of Georgetown University Law Center condemned the remarks, stating, "The tweets' suggestion that the best Supreme Court nominee could not be a Black woman and their use of demeaning language are appalling...The tweets are at odds with everything we stand for at Georgetown Law". Shapiro later deleted the tweet, as well as many others he had written in the past, and issued a statement calling it an "inartful tweet." Shapiro was then placed on administrative leave while being investigated for violations of "professional conduct, non-discrimination, and anti-harassment" rules. As a result of the investigation, Shapiro was reinstated, as the school's investigators found that he was "not properly subject to discipline". Nevertheless, on June 6, Shapiro chose to resign in protest, arguing that the school had "implicitly repealed Georgetown's vaunted Speech and Expression Policy and set me up for discipline the next time I transgress progressive orthodoxy".

== Academics ==
=== Admissions and costs ===
For the class entering in fall of 2025, the school received over 14,000 applications for 650 spots. For the class entering in the fall of 2024, 2,276 out of 11,309 J.D. applicants (20.13%) were offered admission, with 625 (27.46%) matriculating. The median LSAT score for the class entering in fall of 2024 is 171 and the median undergraduate GPA is 3.92. In the 2024–25 academic year, Georgetown Law had 2,176 J.D. students, of whom 32% were minorities and 56% were female.

The total cost of attendance (indicating the cost of tuition, fees, and living expenses) at Georgetown Law for the 2024–25 academic year was $113,450. The Law School Transparency estimated that the debt-financed cost of attendance for three years was $419,938.

=== Publications ===
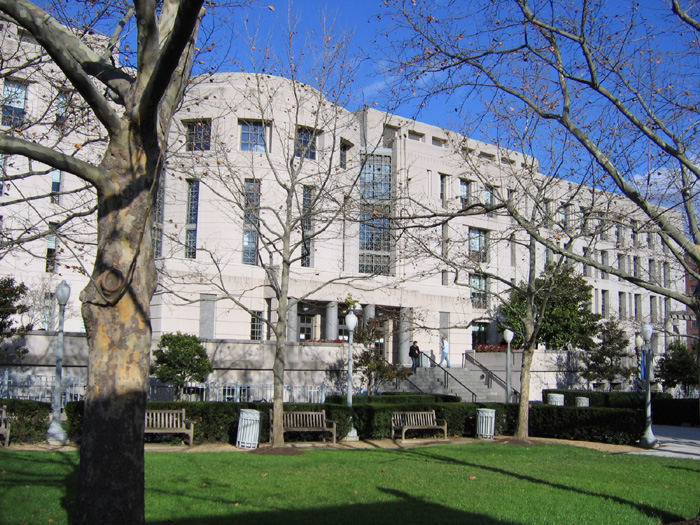
Edward Bennett Williams Law Library, viewed from the campus north quad

Georgetown University Law Center publishes fourteen student-run law journals, two peer-reviewed law journals, and a weekly student-run newspaper, the Georgetown Law Weekly. The journals are:

- American Criminal Law Review
- Food and Drug Law Journal
- Georgetown Environmental Law Review
- Georgetown Immigration Law Journal
- Georgetown Journal of Gender and the Law
- Georgetown Journal of International Law
- Georgetown Journal of Law and Modern Critical Race Perspectives
- Georgetown Journal of Law and Public Policy
- Georgetown Journal of Legal Ethics
- Georgetown Journal on Poverty Law and Policy
- Journal of National Security Law and Policy
- Georgetown Law Technology Review (online only)
- Georgetown Law Journal

=== Clinics ===
Georgetown's clinics are: Appellate Litigation Clinic, Center for Applied Legal Studies, The Community Justice Project, Criminal Defense & Prisoner Advocacy Clinic, Criminal Justice Clinic, D.C. Law Students in Court, D.C. Street Law Program, Domestic Violence Clinic, Federal Legislation and Administrative Clinic, Harrison Institute for Housing & Community Development Clinic, Harrison Institute for Public Law, Institute for Public Representation, International Women's Human Rights Clinic, Juvenile Justice Clinic, Intellectual Property and Information Policy Clinic, and Communications and Technology Law Clinic.

In the Winter 2017 edition of The National Jurist, Georgetown Law's Moot Court Program was ranked #4 in the country for 2015–16 and #5 among U.S. law schools that have had the best moot courts this past decade. Georgetown Law participates in moot court competitions through its Barristers' Council, which has Alternative Dispute Resolution, Appellate, and Trial divisions.

==== Appellate Litigation Clinic ====
Directed by Professor Erica Hashimoto (following 36 years of leadership by Professor Steven H. Goldblatt), the Appellate Litigation Clinic operates akin to a small appellate litigation firm. It has had four cases reach the United States Supreme Court on grants of writs of certiorari. One such case was Wright v. West, 505 U.S. 277 (1992), considered in habeas corpus the question whether the de novo review standard for mixed questions of law and fact established in 1953 (the Brown v. Allen standard) should be overruled. Another was Smith v. Barry, 502 U.S. 244 (1992), which reversed a Fourth Circuit determination that the court did not have jurisdiction over an appeal because the defendant's pro se brief could not serve as a timely notice of appeal.

==== Center for Applied Legal Studies ====
CALS represents refugees seeking political asylum in the United States because of threatened persecution in their home countries. Students in CALS assume primary responsibility for the representation of these refugees, whose requests for asylum have already been rejected by the U.S. government. The Center for Applied Legal Studies was founded in the 1980s by Philip Schrag. Until 1995, the Clinic heard cases in the field of consumer protection. Under the direction of Schrag and Andrew Schoenholtz, the Clinic began specializing in asylum claims, for both detained and non-detained applicants. In conjunction with their work for the Clinic, Schrag and Schoenholtz have written books about America's political asylum system, with the help of Clinic fellows and graduate students. The duo's most recent book, Lives in the Balance, was published in 2014 and provides an empirical analysis of how Homeland Security decided asylum cases over a recent fourteen-year period. The group's work in human rights law has met praise from international organizations like the United Nations Human Rights Council. Under the direction of Schrag and Schoenholtz, the clinic has also focused on more prolonged displacement situations for political refugees.

==== Civil Rights Clinic ====
CRC operates as a public interest law firm, representing individual clients and other public interest organizations, primarily in the areas of discrimination and constitutional rights, workplace fairness, and open government. The Clinic is directed by Professor Aderson Francois, who joined in 2016. Students work with CRC staff attorneys to litigate Freedom of Information Act claims, wage theft suits, and retaliation claims on behalf of employees terminated for asserting their rights under FLSA and DC Wage and Hour law.

==== Criminal Defense and Prisoner Advocacy Clinic ====
Students in CDPAC represent defendants facing misdemeanor charges in D.C. Superior Court, facing parole or supervised release revocation from the United States Parole Commission working with the Public Defender Service for the District of Columbia, and they also work on prisoner advocacy projects. Abbe Smith is the director of CDPAC. Former Public Defender Service for the District of Columbia lawyer Vida Johnson works with Smith in CDPAC and the Prettyman fellowship program.

==== DC Street Law Program ====
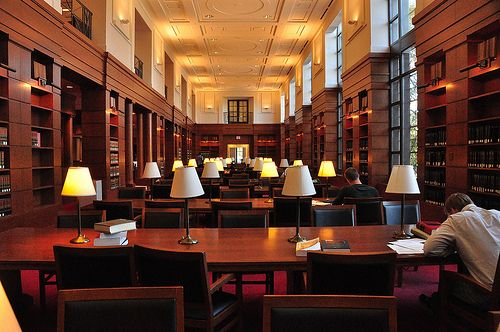
The reading room for students in the Edward Bennett Williams Law Library

The DC Street Law Program, directed by Professor Charisma X. Howell, provides legal education to the DC population through two projects: the Street Law High Schools Clinic and the Street Law Community Clinic. Professor Richard Roe directed the Street Law High Schools Clinic since 1983. Professor Howell became the director in 2018. In the program, students introduce local high school students to the basic structure of the legal system, including the relationship among legislatures, courts, and agencies, and how citizens, especially in their world, relate to the lawmaking processes of each branch of government.

==== Harrison Institute for Public Law ====
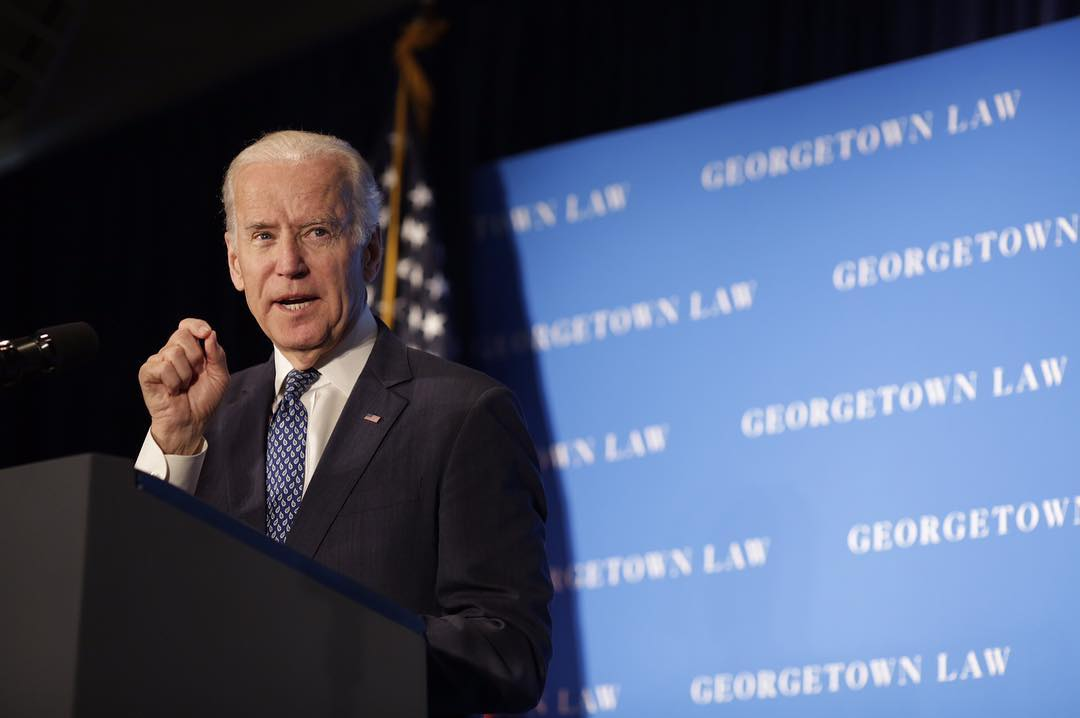
With its strategic location in Washington and less than a mile from Congress, the law school has received many distinguished guest speakers, including Joe Biden, the 46th president of the United States.

The Harrison Institute is one of the longest running public law clinics in the country, having begun as the Project for Community Legal Assistance in 1972. In 1980, it was renamed in honor of Anne Blaine Harrison, a philanthropist and early supporter of the institute. Over its history, the institute has been home to several clinical programs, including focuses on state and local legislation, administrative advocacy, housing and community development, and policy. In 2019, under the directorship of Robert Stumberg, the institute consists of four policy teams: Climate, Health, Human Rights, and Trade. Each of these teams involves students working to shape policy to achieve client goals.

== Campus ==
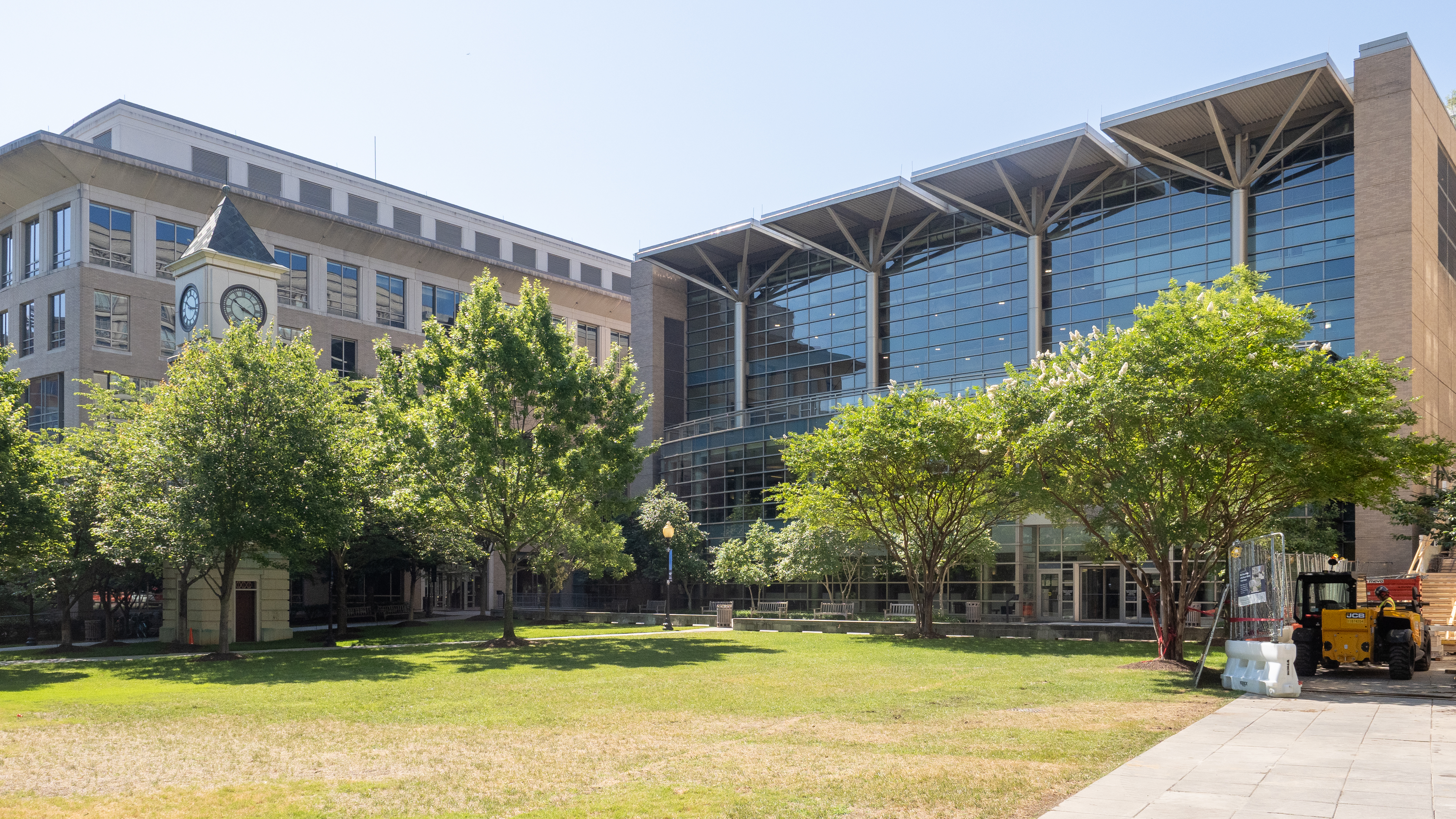
Georgetown Law Campus

The Law Center is located in the Capitol Hill area of Washington, D.C. It is bounded by 2nd St. NW to the west, E St. NW to the south, 1st St. NW and New Jersey Avenue to the east, and Massachusetts Avenue to the north.

The Georgetown Law Library supports the research and educational endeavors of the students and faculty of Georgetown University Law Center. It is the second-largest law library in the United States, and the Law Library houses the nation's fourth-largest law library collection and offers access to thousands of online publications. In 2010, the Law Library was ranked by The National Jurist as the 14th-best law library in the nation.

== Reception ==
=== Bar examination passage ===
In 2024, the overall bar examination passage rate for the law school's first-time examination takers was 93.05%. The Ultimate Bar Pass Rate, which the ABA defines as the passage rate for graduates who sat for bar examinations within two years of graduating, was 97.17% for the class of 2021 and 94.14% for the class of 2022.

=== Employment outcomes ===
ABA employment summary for 2020 J.D. graduates
Employment status	Percentage
Employed – Bar passage required (full-time, long-term)	82.3%
Employed – Bar passage required (part-time and/or short-term)	0.1%
Employed – J.D. advantage	4.6%
Employed – professional position	0.9%
Employed – non-professional position	0.1%
Employed – law school/university funded	5.1%
Employed – undeterminable	0.0%
Pursuing graduate degree full-time	0.9%
Unemployed – start date deferred	1.0%
Unemployed – not seeking	1.3%
Unemployed – seeking	3.6%
Employment status unknown	0.0%
Total of 691 J.D. graduates

Of the 691 J.D. graduates in the Georgetown Law class of 2020 (including both full- and part-time students), 569 (82.3%) held long-term, full-time positions that required bar exam passage (i.e., jobs as lawyers) and were not school-funded nine months after graduation. 644 graduates overall (93.2%) were employed, 6 graduates (0.9%) were pursuing a graduate degree, and 34 graduates (4.9%) were unemployed.

435 J.D. graduates (63.0%) were employed in the private sector, with 368 (53.3%) at law firms with over 250 attorneys. 208 graduates (30.1%) entered the public sector, with 80 (11.6%) employed in public interest positions, 55 (8.0%) employed by the government, 68 (9.8%) in federal or state clerkships, and 5 (0.7%) in academic positions. 35 graduates (5.1%) received funding from Georgetown Law for their positions.

The median reported starting salary for a 2018 J.D. graduate in the private sector was $180,000. The median reported starting salary for a 2018 graduate in the public sector (including government, public interest, and clerkship positions) was $57,000.

272 J.D. graduates (39.4%) in the class of 2020 were employed in Washington, DC, 155 (22.4%) in New York, and 31 (4.5%) in California. 13 (1.9%) were employed outside the United States.

As of 2011, Georgetown Law alumni account for the second highest number of partners at NLJ 100 firms. It is among the top ten feeder schools in eight of the ten largest legal markets in the United States by law job openings (New York, Washington DC, Chicago, Los Angeles, Boston, Houston, San Francisco, and San Diego), again giving it the second-widest reach of all law schools. The school performs especially strongly in its home market, where it is the largest law school and has produced the greatest number of NLJ 100 partners.

Georgetown Law was ranked #11 for placing the highest percentage of 2018 J.D. graduates into associate positions at the 100 largest law firms.

=== Rankings ===
Georgetown Law is part of the T14, a classification of American law schools that frequently claim the Top 14 spots in the annual U.S. News & World Report rankings. Recent rankings include:

Law school rankings

- #14 (tie) - U.S. News & World Report (2025)
- #10 (US) and #13 (Global) - The Academic Ranking of World Universities (2025)
- #8 (US) and #17 (Global) - Times Higher Education (THE) World University Rankings (2025)
- #9 (US) and #26 (Global) - QS World University Rankings (2025)
- #11 (tie) - The New York Times: Law School Rankings (2024)

U.S. News & World Report specialty rankings 2025

- #1 Clinical Training
- #3 Tax Law
- #3 International Law
- #6 Healthcare Law
- #9 (tie) Criminal Law
- #9 Intellectual Property Law
- #11 Constitutional Law
- #11 (tie) Contracts/Commercial Law
- #12 (tie) Business/Corporate Law

Other rankings

- #8 Law School for the Most Graduates at Big Law Firms - U.S. News & World Report (2025)
- #10 for number of J.D. graduates who took associate positions at the 100 largest law firms in the U.S. - The National Law Journal (2024)

== People ==
=== Deans ===
Deans and vice presidents
No.	Name	Years	Ref.
Vice presidents of the Law Department
-	Charles P. James	1870–1873	
-	George W. Paschal	1873–1875	
Deans of Georgetown Law School
1	Charles W. Hoffman	1876–1890	
2	Martin Ferdinand Morris	1889–1890	
3	George E. Hamilton	1900–1903	
4	Harry M. Clabaugh	1903–1914	
5	George E. Hamilton	1914–1941	
6	Hugh J. Fegan	1941–1953	
Deans of Georgetown University Law Center
-	Hugh J. Fegan	1953–1955	
7	Paul R. Dean	1955–1969	
8	Adrian S. Fisher	1969–1976	
9	David J. McCarthy Jr.	1976–1983	
10	Robert Pitofsky	1983–1989	
11	Judith Areen	1989–2004	
12	T. Alexander Aleinikoff	2004–2010	
12	William Treanor	2010–2025	
14	Liz Magill	2026–Present	

=== Faculty ===
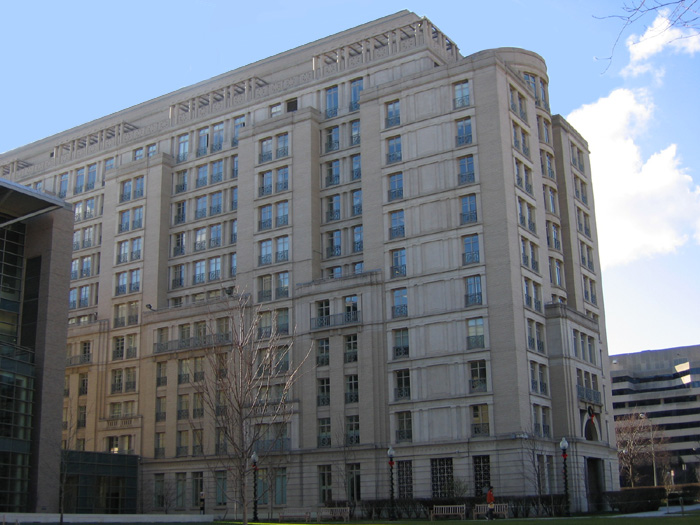
Gewirz Student Center provides student housing for mostly first-year law students.

Notable current faculty include:

- Charles F. Abernathy, professor of civil rights and comparative law
- Lama Abu-Odeh, Palestinian-American scholar of Islamic law, family law, and feminism
- Randy Barnett, Libertarian constitutional law scholar, author of The Structure of Liberty and Restoring the Lost Constitution, 2008 Guggenheim Fellow
- M. Gregg Bloche, professor of public health policy
- Rosa Brooks, professor of national security, military, and international law, columnist for Foreign Policy
- Paul Butler, professor of criminal law and civil rights, expert on jury nullification
- Sheryll D. Cashin, professor of civil rights and housing law
- Paul Clement, former solicitor general of the United States
- Julie E. Cohen, professor of copyright, intellectual property, and privacy law
- David D. Cole, professor of first amendment and criminal procedure law
- Peter Edelman, former assistant secretary of Health and Human Services
- Doug Emhoff, Distinguished Visitor from Practice, Distinguished Fellow of Georgetown Law's Institute for Technology Law and Policy, Second Gentleman of the United States, entertainment lawyer
- Heidi Li Feldman, professor of law
- Lawrence O. Gostin, professor of public health law
- Shon Hopwood, associate professor, convicted bank robber turned jailhouse lawyer who represented matters before the Supreme Court
- Neal Katyal, former acting solicitor general of the United States, professor of national security law
- Marty Lederman, associate professor, deputy assistant attorney general at the Department of Justice Office of Legal Counsel
- Naomi Mezey, professor of law and culture
- Eleanor Holmes Norton, delegate representing Washington, DC in the U.S. House of Representatives
- Victoria F. Nourse, chief counsel to Vice President Joe Biden and principal author of the Violence Against Women Act
- Ladislas Orsy, canonical theologian
- Gary Peller, prominent member of critical legal studies and critical race theory movements
- Nicholas Quinn Rosenkranz, former attorney-advisor at the Office of Legal Counsel in the U.S. Department of Justice
- Louis Michael Seidman, Carmack Waterhouse Professor of Constitutional Law, significant proponent of the critical legal studies movement
- Howard Shelanski, former administrator of the Office of Information and Regulatory Affairs
- Abbe Smith, criminal defense attorney and director of the Criminal Defense & Prisoner Advocacy Clinic
- Daniel K. Tarullo, member of the Board of Governors of the Federal Reserve System
- Kevin Tobia, professor of law, proponent of the experimental jurisprudence movement
- William M. Treanor, dean emeritus of Georgetown University Law Center, former dean of Fordham University School of Law, noted constitutional law expert
- Rebecca Tushnet, professor of copyright, trademark, intellectual property, and first amendment law, noted for her scholarship on fanfiction
- David Vladeck, former director of the Bureau of Consumer Protection at the Federal Trade Commission
- Steve Vladeck, legal scholar specializing in the federal courts, constitutional law, national security law, and military justice
- Edith Brown Weiss, professor of international law and former president of the American Society of International Law
- Robin West, Frederick J. Haas Professor of Law and Philosophy, proponent of feminist legal theory and the law and literature movement
- Can Yeğinsu, barrister, deputy chair of the High Level Panel of Legal Experts on Media Freedom
