= Ron Mallon =

American philosopher

Education
- Education: University of Kansas; Rutgers University

Philosophical work
- Era: Contemporary philosophy
- Region: Western philosophy
- School: Experimental philosophy
- Institutions: Washington University in St. Louis
- Main interests: Moral psychology Experimental philosophy Social construction Critical race theory

Ronald Mallon is an American Professor of Philosophy and Director of the Philosophy-Neuroscience-Psychology Program at Washington University in St. Louis.

== Work ==
Mallon's work is in philosophy of psychology, experimental philosophy, moral psychology, and critical race theory. He is an expert on human kinds, especially race, and how small inequalities can lead to big ones.

== Bibliography ==
- Mallon, R. (2012). (with F. Allhoff and S. Nichols). An Introduction to Philosophy: Traditional and Experimental Readings. Oxford University Press.
- Mallon, R. (2016). The Construction of Human Kinds. Oxford University Press.
