= Kevin Tobia =

American academic

- Born: Kevin Patrick Tobia; New Jersey
- Occupation: Law professor

Academic background
- Education: Yale Law School (JD); Yale University (PhD); University of Oxford (BPhil); Rutgers University (BA)
- Thesis: Essays in Experimental Jurisprudence (2019)

Academic work
- Discipline: Law · Philosophy · Cognitive Science
- Institutions: Georgetown University Law Center
- Notable ideas: Experimental jurisprudence

Kevin Tobia is an American legal scholar based at Georgetown Law, known for his work in constitutional and statutory interpretation.

== Early life ==
Tobia was raised in Bloomfield and Chatham, New Jersey. He attended Chatham High School and was elected to the American Legion's Boys Nation. He received a scholarship to Rutgers University, where he studied philosophy and was an affiliate of the Eagleton Institute of Politics.

In 2012 he was one of fifteen students worldwide awarded an inaugural Ertegun Scholarship to Oxford, where he completed a BPhil in philosophy. He then attended Yale Law School and was an editor of the Yale Law Journal. He completed a PhD in philosophy at Yale University, under the supervision of Stephen Darwall, Joshua Knobe, Gideon Yaffe, and Scott Shapiro.

== Career ==
In 2020, Tobia joined Georgetown Law as a law professor. He published works in philosophy and law, especially in experimental philosophy and experimental jurisprudence, including volumes on Experimental Philosophy of Identity and the Self (2022), and Experimental Jurisprudence (2025). He has also defended the use of linguistics and empirical methods, like survey-experiments, in textualist legal interpretation and his work has been cited by the U.S. Supreme Court. He is among the 50 most downloaded law professors. Stanford Law School listed him as a visiting professor in 2026.

== Views ==
=== Legal philosophy ===
Tobia has defended "experimental jurisprudence," a new approach to legal philosophy. He proposes that legal philosophers should not limit themselves to their own intuitions. Instead, they can use empirical methods to assess whether their intuitions are shared among ordinary people. He has claimed that this approach can help legal philosophers disentangle legal concepts from related ordinary ones:

[L]aw impacts ordinary people, structuring their families, welfare, employment, freedoms, and responsibilities. Ordinary people also create law, contributing directly to the production of legal content as jurors deciding mixed questions or as statutory interpreters. Moreover, any legal expert (whether a legal philosopher or legal official) was once an ordinary person, and it is plausible that they bring some aspects of that ordinary experience and understanding to law. There are similar considerations about legal language: Law is clearly written and expressed with technical language, but it is not a foreign language to its ordinary citizens. Legal notions—cause, consent, reasonableness, intent—share names with similar notions that we use in ordinary life, whose legal meanings are not entirely distinct from their ordinary ones. Empirical study of ordinary notions and ordinary people can help disentangle the ordinary from the legal.

He also studies legal-philosophical questions across languages and cultures and has found cross-cultural similarities in legal principles and interpretation.

In 2022, he published a survey of what hundreds of American law professors believe about legal theory debates. The study found that most professors are on the left and reject originalism; however, more professors were favorable towards textualism.

=== Legal interpretation ===
Tobia has written broadly about textualism in statutory interpretation, often with William Eskridge and Victoria F. Nourse. He has criticized some judicial uses of corpus linguistics, although he and Stefan Th. Gries defended a limited use, and cautioned against recent judicial uses of large language models. He has defended LGBTQ+ rights, especially in the context of employment discrimination.

With Larry Gostin, Tobia defended the legality of federal transit mask requirements during the COVID-19 pandemic, arguing that the Public Health Service Act "plainly empowers CDC to require masks in the midst of a massive and sustained public health emergency" and "that CDC must have ample powers to act decisively and nimbly when the next health crisis arises—and it will." They filed a amicus brief, signed by the American Public Health Association,the Association of American Medical Colleges, the Association of American Medical Colleges, the Infectious Diseases Society of America, and 231 experts in public health and the law, including six former CDC Directors, who led the nation's response to all modern health emergencies, from SARS, MERS, and Zika to Ebola and Influenza H1N1. The critique centered on a judge's analysis of the linguistic meaning of the Public Health Service Act and use of corpus linguistics.

Tobia and Thomas Rex Lee submitted an amicus brief in Pulsifer v. United States, a Supreme Court case concerning the First Step Act's relief of criminal defendants from mandatory minimum sentences for drug-related crimes. That brief drew on their journal article studying how Americans understood the statute's language. Justice Neil Gorsuch, in dissent, cited their brief and its "study involving ordinary Americans." This was reported as "the first time the Supreme Court has cited a survey of Americans to inform its interpretation of a statute's ordinary meaning."

In 2024, he submitted an amicus brief with linguists including James Pustejovsky in Bondi v. VanDerStok, arguing that gun parts kits are subject to federal firearm regulations. Tobia argued that the Gun Control Act's definition of "firearm" includes kits of unassembled firearm parts that can be converted into functional firearms in a day's work. The Supreme Court cited the brief in its linguistic analysis of "firearm," and Justice Clarence Thomas's dissent accused the majority of "drawing heavily" from it.

== Publications ==
=== Books ===
- Experimental Philosophy of Identity and the Self,(Bloomsbury), 2022
- The Cambridge Handbook of Experimental Jurisprudence, (Cambridge University Press), 2025

=== Articles ===
- Testing Ordinary Meaning, Harvard Law Review 123 (2020), 726-806.
- Are There Cross-Cultural Legal Principles? Modal Reasoning Uncovers Procedural Constraints on Law, Cognitive Science 45 (2021).
- Experimental Jurisprudence, University of Chicago Law Review 89 (2022), 735-802.
- Coordination and Expertise Foster Legal Textualism, Proceedings of the National Academy of Sciences 119 (2022).
- Statutory Interpretation from the Outside, Columbia Law Review 122 (2022), 213-330.
- Progressive Textualism, Georgetown Law Journal 110 (2022), 1437-1493.
- "Ordinary Meaning and Ordinary People". University of Pennsylvania Law Review. 171 (2): 365–458. 2023. Archived from the original on November 20, 2023.
- What Do Law Professors Believe About Law and the Legal Academy? , Georgetown Law Journal 112 (2023), 111-189.
- Methodology and Innovation in Jurisprudence, Columbia Law Review 123 (2023), 2483-2516.
- Having Your Day in Robot Court, Harvard Journal of Law & Technology 36 (2023), 127-169.
- Textualism's Defining Moment, Columbia Law Review 123 (2023), 1611-1698.
- The Linguistic and Substantive Canons, Harvard Law Review 137 (2023), 70-108.
- Triangulating Ordinary Meaning, Georgetown Law Journal 112 (2023), 23-54.
- Corpus-linguistic approaches to lexical statutory meaning: Extensionalist vs. intensionalist approaches, Applied Corpus Linguistics (2024).
- Experimental Jurisprudence, Stanford Encyclopedia of Philosophy (2025).
- Large Language Models for Legal Interpretation? Don't Take Their Word for It, Georgetown Law Journal (2025).
