= David J. McCarthy Jr. =

American law school dean

David J. McCarthy Jr. is Dean Emeritus of the Georgetown University Law Center, Washington, DC, USA from 1975 to 1983. McCarthy received a bachelor's degree from Fairfield University, and a J.D., LL.M., and an honorary LL.D. from Georgetown, where he was managing editor of the Georgetown Law Journal.

McCarthy became a professor of law at Georgetown in 1965 specializing in state and local government law, and has written a number of books on the topic. Before coming to Georgetown McCarthy was an attorney at the United States Department of Justice and was the founding Director of the D.C. Bail Project.

== Selected books ==
- And William D. Valente, Local Government Law: Cases and Materials (4th ed., 1992, & supp. 1995).
- Local Government Law in a Nutshell (4th ed., 1995).
