= Georgetown Environmental Law Review =

- Discipline: Law review
- Language: English
- Edited by: Anne Kettler

Publication details
- History: 1988-Present
- Publisher: Georgetown University Law Center (United States)
- Frequency: Quarterly

Standard abbreviations
- Bluebook: Geo. Envtl. L. Rev.
- ISO 4: Georget. Environ. Law Rev.

Indexing
- ISSN: 1042-1858
- LCCN: 88659447
- OCLC no.: 49847215

Links
- Journal homepage; Online archive; Journal page on university website

The Georgetown Environmental Law Review is a quarterly student-edited law review published at Georgetown University Law Center covering the legal implications of environmental issues including: climate change, renewable energy, and the intersection of the environment and international legal areas such as trade, human rights, security, and technology transfer. It was established in 1988 as the Georgetown International Environmental Law Review and obtained its current title in 2015. The first issue of each year's volume is dedicated to international issues. According to the Washington & Lee University law review rankings, the journal has an impact factor of 9.02 as of 2020.
