= Stephen Stich =

American academic (born 1943)

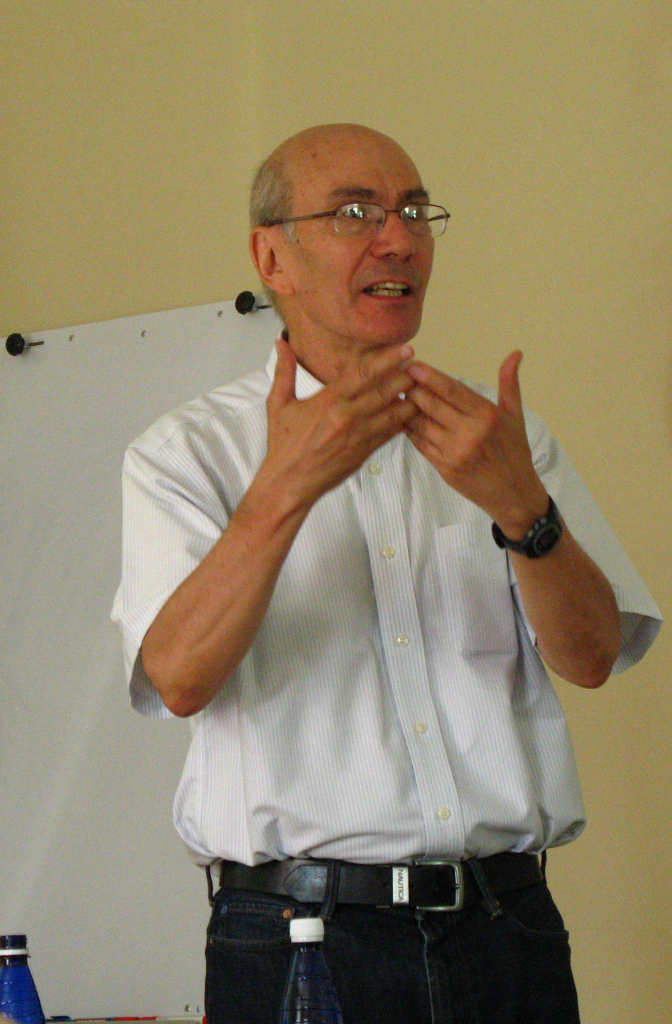
- Stich giving the Gottlob Frege Lectures in Theoretical Philosophy 2010 in Tartu, Estonia
- Born: Stephen Peter Stich; 1943 (age 82–83)

Education
- Education: University of Pennsylvania; Princeton University
- Doctoral advisor: Paul Benacerraf; Gilbert Harman
- Other advisor: Nelson Goodman

Philosophical work
- Era: Contemporary philosophy
- Region: Western philosophy
- School: Analytic
- Main interests: Philosophy of mind, epistemology, moral psychology
- Notable ideas: Experimental philosophy

Stephen Peter Stich (born May 9, 1943) is an American academic who is Distinguished Professor of Philosophy and Cognitive Science Emeritus at Rutgers University. Stich's main philosophical interests are in the philosophy of mind, epistemology, and moral psychology. His 1983 book From Folk Psychology to Cognitive Science: The Case Against Belief received much attention; it argues for a form of eliminative materialism about the mind. Stich's views later changed, as indicated in his 1996 book Deconstructing the Mind.

== Education and career ==
Stich attended the University of Pennsylvania, where he was a member of the Philomathean Society. He received his BA in 1964, summa cum laude with distinction in philosophy. He then did graduate work at Princeton University, receiving his PhD in 1968 under the direction of Paul Benacerraf and Gilbert Harman.

Stich has held full-time teaching positions at the University of Michigan (1968-1978), University of Maryland, College Park (1978-1986), University of California, San Diego (1986-1989), and, since 1989, Rutgers University.

Stich was the Visiting Senior Lecturer at University of Sydney in 1984-1985 and the Clark-Way-Harrison Distinguished Visiting Professor at Washington University in St. Louis in 2007. In 2005, he joined the University of Sheffield as an honorary professor. He remains primarily at Rutgers but periodically visits Sheffield, where he teaches and works at the Hang Seng Centre for Cognitive Studies.

In 2007, Stich received the Jean Nicod Prize and gave a series of lectures in Paris titled Moral Theory Meets Cognitive Science: How the Cognitive Science Can Transform Traditional Debates. In 2009, he was elected a Fellow of the American Academy of Arts and Sciences.

In 2020, Stich became a visiting professor at Princeton University through the University Center for Human Values.

== Philosophical work ==
Stich is primarily known in philosophy for his work in the philosophy of mind, cognitive science, epistemology, and moral psychology.

In philosophy of mind and cognitive science, Stich argued for a form of eliminative materialism—the view that talk of the mental should be replaced with talk of its physical substrate. He later revised his view, as indicated in his 1996 book Deconstructing the Mind.

In epistemology, he has explored (with several of his colleagues) the nature of intuitions using the techniques of experimental philosophy, especially epistemic intuitions that vary among cultures. This work reflects a general skepticism about conceptual analysis and the traditional methods of analytic philosophy. In The Fragmentation of Reason he sketches a form of epistemic relativism "in the spirit of pragmatism".

Stich and Shaun Nichols are responsible for a theory of how humans understand the mental states of themselves and others, or mindreading. Their theory is a hybrid, containing elements of both the simulation theory and theory theory, and also aims to explain the mental architecture that enables pretence.

== Selected publications ==
- 1972, "Grammar, Psychology and Indeterminacy", Journal of Philosophy, LXIX, 22, pp. 799–818.
- 1978, "Empiricism, Innateness and Linguistic Universals", Philosophical Studies, Vol. 33, No. 3, pp. 273–286.
- 1978, "Beliefs and Sub-Doxastic States", Philosophy of Science, Vol. 45, No. 4, pp. 499–518.
- 1979, "Do Animals Have Beliefs?" The Australasian Journal of Philosophy, Vol. 57, No. 1, pp. 15–28.
- 1983, From Folk Psychology to Cognitive Science: The Case Against Belief, MIT Press.
- 1985, "Could Man Be An Irrational Animal?" Synthese, Vol. 64, No. 1, pp. 115–135.
- 1988, "Reflective Equilibrium, Analytic Epistemology and the Problem of Cognitive Diversity", Synthese, Vol. 74, No. 3, pp. 391–413.
- 1990, "Connectionism, Eliminativism and the Future of Folk Psychology", Philosophical Perspectives, Vol. 4, pp. 499–533. (with William Ramsey & Joseph Garon)
- 1990, The Fragmentation of Reason: Preface to a Pragmatic Theory of Cognitive Evaluation, MIT Press.
- 1992, "What Is a Theory of Mental Representation?" Mind, Vol. 101, No. 402, pp. 243–61.
- 1993, "Naturalizing Epistemology: Quine, Simon and the Prospects for Pragmatism", in C. Hookway & D. Peterson (eds.), Philosophy and Cognitive Science, Royal Institute of Philosophy, Supplement no. 34 (Cambridge: Cambridge University Press), pp. 1–17. Online text
- 1996, Deconstructing the Mind, Oxford University Press. Chapter 1 online
- 1998, "The Flight to Reference, or How Not to Make Progress in the Philosophy of Science", (with Michael Bishop) Philosophy of Science, Vol. 65, No. 1, pp. 33–49. Online text
- 1998, "Theory Theory to the Max" (with Shaun Nichols), Mind and Language, Vol. 13, No. 3, pp. 421–49. Online text
- 2001, "Jackson's Empirical Assumptions" (with Jonathan Weinberg), Philosophy and Phenomenological Research, Vol. 62, No. 3, pp. 637–643. Online text
- 2003, Mindreading (co-authored with Shaun Nichols), Oxford University Press.
- 2006, "Two Theories about the Cognitive Architecture Underlying Morality" (with Daniel Kelley), Online Philosophy Conference, Online PDF
- 2012, "Collected Papers, Volume 2: Knowledge, Rationality, and Morality, 1978-2010", Oxford University Press, 2012, ISBN 9780199733477.
- 2017, "Gettier Across Cultures" (with Edouard Machery, David Rose, Amita Chatterjee, Kaori Karasawa, Noel Struchiner, Smita Sirker, Naoki Usui, and Takaaki Hashimoto), Nous, Vol. 51.

== See also ==
- American philosophy
- List of American philosophers
- List of Jean Nicod Prize laureates
