= Shaun Nichols =

American philosopher (born 1964)

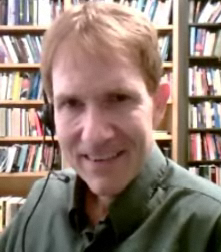
- Born: February 7, 1964 (age 62); Wolf Point, Montana

Education
- Education: Stanford University, Rutgers University

Philosophical work
- Era: Contemporary philosophy
- Region: Western philosophy
- School: Experimental philosophy
- Institutions: Cornell University
- Website: sites.google.com/view/shaunbnichols/home

Shaun Nichols (born 7 February 1964) is an American professor of philosophy at Cornell University specializing in the philosophy of cognitive sciences, moral psychology and philosophy of mind.

== Education and career ==
Nichols received his PhD in philosophy from Rutgers in 1992 under the supervision of Stephen Stich and his BA in philosophy from Stanford. He is a leading contributor to experimental philosophy and was awarded the Stanton Prize by the Society for Philosophy and Psychology in 2005.

He taught at the College of Charleston, University of Arizona and, since 2019, Cornell University.

== Philosophical work ==
His early work was concerned primarily with questions in the theory of mind and the nature of imagination.

Nichols's current research projects are in experimental philosophy, moral psychology, bayesian cognitive science, cultural evolution, free will, and the self.

=== Experimental philosophy ===
In his work within experimental philosophy, Nichols has addressed questions about cross-cultural differences in semantic intuitions, free will, intentional action, the nature of moral judgment, and a number of other key philosophical concepts.

== Bibliography ==
=== Authored ===
- Nichols, S. 2021. Rational Rules: Towards a Theory of Moral Learning. New York: Oxford University Press. ISBN 978-0-19-886915-3
- Nichols, S. 2004. Sentimental Rules: On the Natural Foundations of Moral Judgment. New York: Oxford University Press. ISBN 978-0-19-516934-8
- Nichols, S. and Stich, S. 2003. Mindreading: An Integrated Account of Pretense, Self-awareness and Understanding Other Minds. Oxford: Oxford University Press. ISBN 978-0-19-823609-2

=== Edited ===
- Knobe, J. & Nichols, S. 2008. Experimental Philosophy. New York: Oxford University Press. ISBN 978-0-19-532325-2
- Nichols, S. 2006. The Architecture of the Imagination: New Essays on Pretense, Possibility, and Fiction. Oxford: Oxford University Press. ISBN 978-0-19-927572-4
- Nadelhoffer, T., Nahmias, E., & Nichols, S. 2012. Moral Psychology: Historical and Contemporary Readings. Malden, MA: John Wiley & Sons

== See also ==
- American philosophy
- List of American philosophers
