= Edouard Machery =

French historian of science

- Education: Université de Paris-Sorbonne (Ph.D.)
- Scientific career
- Fields: Philosophy, cognitive science
- Workplaces: University of Pittsburgh

Edouard Machery is a French philosopher who is distinguished professor in the Department of History and Philosophy of Science at the University of Pittsburgh.

== Early life and education ==
Edouard Machery received a Ph.D. in philosophy at the Université de Paris-Sorbonne in 2004.

== Career and works ==
Machery works in philosophy, experimental philosophy, and cognitive science, especially concepts. According to him, the notion of concept is ill-suited for scientific psychology. Therefore, he criticizes neo-empiricist accounts of concepts. His work in experimental psychology focuses on external validity and statistics. He has also worked on theories of human cognition.

Machery has written on various topics, including categorization and concept learning. He has used experimental and quasi-experimental methods to determine the characteristics of intuition and folk judgments about intentional action.

== Books ==
- Doing without concepts
- Philosophy within its proper bounds

== Reviews of works ==
Machery's work has been reviewed by other cognitive scientists.

== Awards ==
In 2011, Machery received the University of Pittsburgh's Chancellor's Distinguished Research Award. In 2013, he received the Society for Philosophy and Psychology's Stanton Prize. In 2022, he was elected President of the Society for Philosophy and Psychology for 2023-2024.
