= Valerie G. Hardcastle =

American philosopher

Valerie G. Hardcastle is a professor of Philosophy and Psychology at The University of Cincinnati who grew up in Houston, Texas.

== Education ==
She was a double major at the University of California, Berkeley, earning bachelor's degrees in Political Science and Philosophy in 1986, and then a master's degree in Philosophy from The University of Houston, and an interdisciplinary Ph.D. in Cognitive Science and Philosophy from the University of California, San Diego. Her coursework has been affiliated with areas such as; Women's, Gender, and Sexuality Studies and has most recently been focusing her time and research on the study of the neuroscience of violence. She is also a Scholar-in-Residence at The Weaver Institute of Law and Psychiatry and is also a Director of The Medical Humanities and Bioethics Certificate. Hardcastle is an internationally known scholar, with a total of 5 books that she has authored and a total of 120 total essays that she has written. Those publications only begin the list of achievements she has achieved throughout her lifetime thus far.

== Career ==
Hardcastle specializes in philosophy of neuroscience/biology, philosophy of cognitive science, philosophy of psychology, and philosophical implications of psychiatry. She researches bioethics/neuroethics, behavioral neuroscience, neuropsychology, cognitive psychology, and philosophy of mind. She teaches metaphysics, science studies, feminist philosophy of science.

Most recently Hardcastle stepped down as the Dean of McMicken College of Arts and Sciences and had been in this position since 2007.

Prior to her move to U.C., Hardcastle had held multiple positions at Virginia Tech where she earned multiple awards and achievements throughout her time there from 2000-2007. Some of these positions which she held include; The Associate Dean of the college of Liberal Arts and Human Sciences, Head of the Department of Science and Technology in Society at Virginia Tech / Chair, Center for Science and Technology Studies at Virginia Tech, as well as being the Director of Graduate Program in Science and Technology Studies (STS) at Virginia Tech from 2000-2006.

She also held many teaching roles at The University of California, San Diego as well as The University of Houston before heading to Virginia Tech and also was taught at The University of Cincinnati for one year from 1998-1999, prior to her current positions held there at U.C. currently.

== Publications ==
- Locating Consciousness. (1995) Philadelphia and Amsterdam: John Benjamins Press (Advances in Consciousness Research Series). xviii + 264 pp.
- How to Build a Theory in Cognitive Science. (1996) Albany, New York: State University of New York Press. (Philosophy and Biology Series). x + 249 pp.
- The Myth of Pain. (1999). Cambridge, MA: MIT Press (Disorders of Mind Series) xv + 298 pp.
- Hardcastle, V.G., and Dietrich, E. Sisyphus's Boulder: The Knowable and Its Limits in Scientific and Philosophical Attempts to Understand Consciousness (2004). Philadelphia and Amsterdam: John Benjamins Press (Advances in Consciousness Research Series). xii + 133.
- Constructing Selves. (2008). Philadelphia and Amsterdam: John Benjamins Press (Advances in Consciousness Research Series).

Many of Hardcastle's publications and articles are based on her research in cognitive science. She focuses on how and why the brains function and react to certain aspects. An example of this is when she studies whether the function of brains is to process information in order to produce adaptive behaviors. Hardcastle focuses her studies and works on the nature and structure of interdisciplinary theories in the cognitive sciences. She has worked to develop a philosophical framework for understanding conscious phenomena responsive to neuroscientific, psychiatric, and psychological data.

== Personal life ==
Hardcastle is married and has three children.
