= Experimental jurisprudence =

Field of legal research

Experimental jurisprudence (X-Jur) is an emerging field of legal scholarship that explores the nature of legal phenomena through psychological investigations of legal concepts. The field departs from traditional analytic legal philosophy in its ambition to elucidate common intuitions in a systematic fashion employing the methods of social science. Equally, unlike research in legal psychology, X-Jur emphasises the philosophical implications of its findings, such as whether, how, and in what respects the law's content is a matter of moral perspective. While some legal theorists have welcomed the emergence of X-Jur, others have expressed reservations regarding its proposed contributions.

== Background ==
Experimental jurisprudence (X-Jur) is an outgrowth of the broader experimental philosophy (X-Phi) movement. Emerging in the early 2000s, and focusing initially on the folk concepts of semantic reference, knowledge, and intentional action, X-Phi represented a rejection of analytic philosophy's traditional 'armchair' speculation about common conceptual intuitions. As a similarly empirical approach to the analysis of folk legal concepts developed in the 2010s, the prospect of a novel method of legal theory, 'experimental jurisprudence', was recognised.

X-Jur shares analytic philosophy's interest in a range of questions, including the longstanding issue of whether the existence and content of the law is a matter of social fact alone. But X-Jur scholarship has argued that philosophers' appeals to the content of folk legal concepts ought to be tested empirically so that, the 'big [philosophical] cost of rely[ing]... on… a concept that is distinct from that used by folk', may be allocated correctly.

== Themes ==
X-Jur exhibits two basic lines of inquiry into, respectively, the folk concepts associated with features of particular laws or legal methods that are common among modern legal systems, and the general folk concepts of law and of rule application or legal interpretation.

=== Specific legal concepts ===
One broad X-Jur research agenda concerns topics in 'special' jurisprudence. Legal theory often attributes the conceptual elements of common legal rules to particular ethical theories or to certain descriptive (non-moralistic) sorts of judgment. X-Jur has challenged many of these traditional theoretical understandings. For instance:

- Scott Shapiro and Josh Knobe argue that empirical data about people's ordinary causal judgements supports a model of legal causation that, contrary to legal doctrine, is not purely descriptive in nature but which features a role for moral judgements about norms.
- Studies on professional judges' ascriptions of criminal intent (mens rea) have been reported that suggest that, just like folk ascriptions, judicial ascriptions of intentional action (guilt) are affected by the moral valence of the consequences of the acts in question.
- Ordinary people have been found to focus on the conditions that are perceived to be essential to consent and so may not consider an individual's consent (to sex, for example) to be nullified by the violation of a condition that the individual herself considers to be a prerequisite. This result has been taken to explain courts' failure, in variety of contexts, to apply the autonomy-based model of consent to which many ethical theories subscribe.
- Many legal cases depend on whether a jury finds conduct "reasonable." X-Jur research indicates that everyday citizens think reasonable conduct falls between the ordinary and the ideal. Studies in tort law suggest that laypeople judging reasonableness are more concerned with what is ordinary or customary than with what is economically rational under the Hand Formula. The risks associated with conduct also play a bigger role in whether it is judged reasonable than the Hand Formula instructs. Together, these findings pose challenges for economic accounts of reasonableness.
- Many legal theorists and judges argue that statutes (and constitutions) should be construed according to their 'ordinary meaning', as determined by dictionaries or corpus linguistics. Kevin Tobia reports studies that suggest that ordinary people's ascriptions of linguistic meaning can diverge from both these sources.

Collectively, this line of research suggests that a priori assumptions about the relationship between legal doctrine and associated folk legal concepts call for philosophically informed empirical investigation.

=== General concept of law ===
A narrower X-Jur research agenda concerns topics in 'general' jurisprudence, namely, the questions of the nature of law itself and of the application or interpretation of rules in general. This research has reported that, in contrast to traditional accounts of legal meaning, which reduce it to a single dimension, either the rule maker's intention or the rule's text, a range of factors are intuitively at work in the application of rules. Indeed, recent studies suggest that, in line with moralistic accounts of legal interpretation, rule violation judgments may sometimes be influenced by moral appraisals.

The question of whether morality is a prerequisite of legal validity has also attracted empirical scrutiny, with studies exploring both whether the folk concept of law includes Lon Fuller's principles of procedural morality and/or substantive moral principles, such as basic gender and racial equality. Such scholarship suggests that the satisfaction of procedural moral principles is not intuitively critical to legal validity, at least when considering specific statutes. In contrast, consistently with natural law theory, these studies indicate that a statute's substantive morality is intuitively intrinsic to its existence as law.

Together, these lines of research have challenged the consistency with ordinary language of legal positivism, the view that the law's representation of moral values is ultimately just a matter of political circumstance.

=== Methodology ===
Experimental jurisprudence uses a variety of empirical tools, including:

- Survey experiments: Participants are presented with hypothetical scenarios and asked to make legal or moral judgments, often varying key factors to identify patterns of reasoning.
- Quantitative data analysis: Researchers use statistical techniques to analyze responses and detect trends in legal intuitions.
- Cross-cultural comparisons: To examine how intuitions about law and justice may differ across societies and legal traditions.
- Cognitive and behavioral experiments: Sometimes integrated with neuroscience to explore the psychological underpinnings of legal thought.

These methods are used to investigate how laypeople and trained jurists differ (or converge) in their interpretations of legal concepts, and how background moral beliefs influence legal reasoning.

=== Research Areas ===
Key areas of study in experimental jurisprudence include:

- Causation in legal responsibility: How people determine who caused a particular harm.
- Intentionality and moral judgment: The distinction between intentional and unintentional acts, especially in criminal contexts.
- Blame and punishment: How people assign blame and assess appropriate sanctions.
- Legal interpretation: How ordinary individuals understand legal texts, such as contracts or statutes.
- Normative vs. descriptive insights: Investigating how empirical data can (or cannot) inform normative legal theory.

== Criticism ==
X-Jur's commitment to the potential philosophical significance of systematic research into folk concepts has been welcomed by some legal theorists but has also attracted criticism. According to one line of objection, treating folk concepts as a basis for legal philosophy is liable to reduce such inquiry to a 'glorified lexicography' whose results will be culturally contingent, and which will be unable to point to universal and timeless truths. The range of cross-cultural or nationally representative X-Jur remains limited; there are indications, however, that at least some features of folk legal concepts, notably the role of procedural morality, may be found in both culturally and linguistically diverse locations.

A second line of objection focuses on X-Jur that documents laypeople's intuitions. It claims that, for philosophical purposes, the understandings of law and legal concepts that matter are not those of the population at large but rather those of lawyers and legal officials. Analogously to criticism of X-Phi that privileges the 'expert' intuitions of philosophers over those laypeople, this view holds that the shared emphasis on folk legal concepts of both analytic and experimental approaches overlooks the importance of training and expertise in the construction and maintenance of both legal systems and of discrete legal phenomena.

== Articles ==
- Knobe, J. (2003). "Intentional Action and Side Effects in Ordinary Language." Analysis, 63(279), 190–194.
- Mikhail, J. (2007). "Universal Moral Grammar: Theory, Evidence and the Future." Trends in Cognitive Sciences, 11(4), 143–152.
- Nadelhoffer, T., & Feltz, A. (2008). "The Actor–Observer Bias and Moral Intuitions: An Empirical Study." Philosophical Psychology, 21(5), 525–543.
- Bix, B. (2012). Jurisprudence: Theory and Context. Sweet & Maxwell.
- Tobia, K. (2020). "Experimental Jurisprudence." In: The Routledge Handbook of Experimental Philosophy of Law.
