= Online Consciousness Conference =

The Online Consciousness Conference held at Consciousness Online was founded in 2008 by Richard Brown, then a graduate student at the CUNY Graduate Center. The conference was inspired by and partially modeled on the Online Philosophy Conference started by Thomas Nadelhoffer and Eddie Nahmias, with one major difference being the heavy use of homemade video and audio presentations, and another difference being the restricted focus of the conference on consciousness studies as opposed to all of philosophy.

== The conferences ==
The first conference was held February 20 – March 4, 2009 with the theme "Philosophers Facing Phenomenal Consciousness" and a keynote given by David M. Rosenthal. Papers from this conference were subsequently published in the Journal of Consciousness Studies. The second conference was held February 19 – March 5, 2010 with the theme "Lessons and Limits from the Empirical Study of Consciousness" with keynote talks by Hakwan Lau (psychology Columbia) with commentary by Ned Block, David Rosenthal and David Chalmers, and Collin Clifford (psychology University of Sydney). Papers from it are due to be published in Consciousness and Cognition. The third conference was held February 18 – March 4, 2011 with the theme "Neurophilosophy and the Philosophy of Neuroscience" and featured invited talks from Paul Churchland, Kathleen Akins, Stevan Harnad and Jesse Prinz.

Past presentations and the discussion at the conference is preserved online and can be viewed at Consciousness Online.
