= The Georgetown Law Journal =

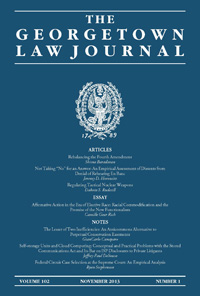
- Discipline: Law review
- Language: English

Publication details
- History: 1912–present
- Publisher: Georgetown University Law Center (United States)
- Frequency: Bimonthly

Standard abbreviations
- Bluebook: Geo. L.J.
- ISO 4: Georget. Law J.

Indexing
- ISSN: 0016-8092

Links
- Journal homepage

The Georgetown Law Journal is a student-edited scholarly journal published at Georgetown University Law Center. It is the flagship law review of the Georgetown University Law Center.

== Overview ==
The Georgetown Law Journal is headquartered at Georgetown University Law Center in Washington, D.C., and has published more than 500 issues since its inception, as well as the widely used Annual Review of Criminal Procedure (ARCP), a comprehensive practitioner's guide to criminal procedure. The Journal is currently, and always has been, run by law students.

== History ==
Volume 1, Issue 1 was published in November 1912, under the supervision of Editor-in-Chief Eugene Quay. At the time, an annual subscription to the new Journal cost one dollar. The first article was titled “The 125th Anniversary of the Drafting of the Constitution of the United States.” In a three-paragraph statement of purpose, the editors of the new Journal proclaimed:

When a school has gathered to itself some thousand potential lawyers, its efforts in the line of literary endeavor should find some proper expression; when a law school has reached the rank to which Georgetown has attained, it should be represented by a review that would take a place as high; and when we scan the names that make up the list of Georgetown’s faculty and the roster of her alumni, we can see no room for fear but that a journal representing her would take its proper rank.

— 1 Geo. L.J. 50, 50 (1912).

== Membership ==
Today, the Journal employs approximately 120 second- and third-year law students—about 60 in their graduating year who serve in editorial positions and 60 in intermediate years who serve as staff. The staff collect and check sources, performing technical edits and checking for typographical errors. The upperclass students are tasked with administering the Journal‘s daily operations.

In order to gain journal membership, first-year students are permitted to participate in the Write On competition after completing their final exams in the spring semester. The competition is administered by the Georgetown Law Office of Journal Administration.

Students are offered positions on the Journal based on the following methods:

- Based on the student's score in the Write On competition
- Based on a combination of Write On score and first-year grades
- Based on a combination of Write On score and personal statement detailing the contribution the student will make to the Journal's diversity.

== Annual Review of Criminal Procedure ==
The Annual Review of Criminal Procedure (ARCP) is a comprehensive, topic-by-topic summary of federal criminal procedure. The goal of the ARCP—which is written, updated, and edited by members of The Georgetown Law Journal—is to provide readers with an objective, concise, and accurate overview of criminal procedure in the federal courts.

The ARCP serves as a practical aid to a diverse readership that includes prosecutors and defense attorneys, judges and their law clerks, and prisoners assisting in their own defense or appeal. Over eleven thousand copies are distributed annually. The ARCP is sold at a discount to prisoners.

The ARCP includes a preface, often written by a well-regarded legal practitioner, academic, or judge. The 2012 preface was written by United States Attorney General Eric Holder. The 2015 preface, written by Judge Alex Kozinski of the United States Court of Appeals for the Ninth Circuit, critiqued many aspects of the criminal justice system. The United States Department of Justice published a letter responding to Judge Kozinski's preface, and the dispute generated significant media coverage.
