= Knebel =

Knebel is a German surname of multiple origins. Notable people with the surname include:

- Andreas Knebel (born 1960), East German athlete
- Corey Knebel (born 1991), American professional baseball player
- Fletcher Knebel (1911–1993), American author of several popular works of political fiction
- Gottfried Knebel (born 1908), German botanist
- John A. Knebel (born 1936), United States Secretary of Agriculture 1976–1977
- Joseph Knebel (1854–1926), Russian publisher
- Karl Ludwig von Knebel (1744–1834), German poet and translator
- Maren Knebel, German sprint canoeist who has competed since the mid-2000s
- Maria Knebel (1898–1985), Russian actor, director, and teacher

== See also ==
- Knebelite, a silicate mineral

Similar surnames, possibly of different etymologies
- Knab, Knabb, Knabe, Knäbel/Knaebel, Knabl, Knap, Knape, Knapp, Knappe, Knapper
- Knebel, Kneip, Kneipp, Knep, Knepp, Knepper, Kneppers
- Knip, Knipp, Knipl, Knippel, Knipper, Knippers, Knitel, Knittel
- Knobe, Knobel, Knobl, Knoop, Knop, Knope, Knopp, Knops, Knopf, Knopff
- Knoepffler, Knoepfler, Knöppel/Knoeppel, Knopper, Knoppers, Knöpfle, Knopfler
- Knuppe, Knüppel/Knuppel/Knueppel, Knuttel
