= Knobel =

Knobel may refer to:

== Places ==
- Knobel, Arkansas, a town in Clay County, Arkansas, United States
- Knobel (crater), a crater on Mars

== People ==
- August Wilhelm Knobel (1807–1863), German Protestant theologian
- Betty Wehrli-Knobel (1904–1998), Swiss journalist and writer
- Daniel Knobel, South African military commander
- Edward Knobel (1841–1930), British businessman and astronomer
- Michele Knobel, literacy education academic
- Norma Lynn Knobel, birth name of Norma Hunt (1938–2023), American football franchise co-owner

== See also ==
Similar surnames, possibly of different etymologies
- Knab, Knabb, Knabe, Knäbel/Knaebel, Knabl, Knap, Knape, Knapp, Knappe, Knapper
- Knebel, Kneip, Kneipp, Knep, Knepp, Knepper, Kneppers
- Knip, Knipp, Knipl, Knippel, Knipper, Knippers, Knitel, Knittel
- Knobe, Knobel, Knobl, Knoop, Knop, Knope, Knopp, Knops, Knopf/Knopff
- Knoepffler, Knoepfler, Knöppel/Knoeppel, Knopper, Knoppers, Knöpfle, Knopfler
- Knuppe, Knüppel/Knuppel/Knueppel, Knuttel
