= Knuttel =

Knuttel or Knüttel is a German surname, similar Knittel derived either from a nickname or an occupation derived from a Middle High German word meaning a hitting implement: a club, a kudgel, a shepherd's staff, or a stonemason's mallet.. The surnames Knippel and Knuppel are of similar etymology. Notable people with the surname include:

- Gerhardus Knuttel Wzn (1889–1968), Dutch art historian and director of the City Museum in The Hague
- Graham Knuttel (1954–2023), Irish artist
- Joannis Knuttel (1878–1965), Dutch socialist
- Timothy Knüttel (born 1992), German sportsman, American football and Canadian football player

== See also ==
Similar surnames, possibly of different etymologies
- Knab, Knabb, Knabe, Knäbel/Knaebel, Knabl, Knap, Knape, Knapp, Knappe, Knapper
- Knebel, Kneip, Kneipp, Knep, Knepp, Knepper, Kneppers
- Knip, Knipp, Knipl, Knippel, Knipper, Knippers, Knitel, Knittel
- Knobe, Knobel, Knobl, Knoop, Knop, Knope, Knopp, Knops, Knopf, Knopff
- Knoepffler, Knoepfler, Knöppel/Knoeppel, Knopper, Knoppers, Knöpfle, Knopfler
- Knuppe, Knüppel/Knuppel/Knueppel, Knuttel
