= Knittel =

Knittel is a German surname, a variant of Knüttel derived either from a nickname or an occupation derived from a Middle High German word meaning a hitting implement: a club, a kudgel, a shepherd's staff, or a stonemason's mallet. The surnames Knippel and Knuppel are of similar etymology. Notable people with the surname include:

- Anna Stainer-Knittel (1841–1915) an Austrian painter
- Bastian Knittel
- Benedikt Knittel a monk and poet of the 17th century
- Eric Knittel
- Franz Anton Knittel Lutheran orthodox theologian
- Gustav Knittel a German officer and convicted war criminal
- Hardy Knittel
- John Knittel a German-English-Swiss novelist
- Josef Alois Knittel
- Krzysztof Knittel

== See also ==
- Knittelvers may also be called Knittel
- Knittel, Iowa

Similar surnames, possibly of different etymologies
- Knab, Knabb, Knabe, Knabl, Knap, Knape, Knapp, Knappe, Knapper
- Kneip, Kneipp, Knep, Knepp, Knepper, Kneppers
- Knip, Knipp, Knipl, Knippel, Knipper, Knippers, Knittel
- Knoop, Knop, Knope, Knopp, Knops, Knopf, Knopff
- Knoepffler, Knoepfler, Knöppel/Knoeppel, Knopper, Knoppers, Knöpfle, Knopfler
- Knuppe, Knüppel/Knuppel/Knueppel, Knuttel
