= Kneip =

Kneip is a surname. Notable people with the surname include:

- Christoph Kneip (born 1980), German épée fencer
- Gustav Kneip (1905–1992), German composer and conductor
- Richard F. Kneip (1933–1987), American politician and diplomat
- Lisa Kneip (born 2002), Luxembourgian footballer

== See also ==
- Kneip–Bredthauer House

Similar surnames, possibly of different etymologies
- Knab, Knabb, Knabe, Knabl, Knap, Knape, Knapp, Knappe, Knapper
- Kneip, Kneip, Knep, Knepp, Knepper, Kneppers
- Knip, Knipp, Knipl, Knippel, Knipper, Knippers
- Knoop, Knop, Knope, Knopp, Knops, Knopf, Knopff
- Knoepffler, Knoepfler, Knöppel/Knoeppel, Knopper, Knoppers, Knöpfle, Knopfler
- Knupp, Knuppe, Knüppel/Knuppel/Knueppel
