= Knoepffler =

Knoepffler is a German occupational surname. The word is an orthographic variant of Knöpfler, "buttonmaker". Notable people with the surname include:

- Campari Knoepffler (born 1959), Nicaraguan swimmer
- Nikolaus Knoepffler (born 1962), German philosopher and theologian

== See also ==
Similar surnames, possibly of different etymologies
- Knab, Knabb, Knabe, Knabl, Knap, Knape, Knapp, Knappe, Knapper
- Knep, Knepp, Knepper, Kneppers
- Knip, Knipp, Knipl, Knippel, Knipper, Knippers
- Knoop, Knop, Knope, Knopp, Knops, Knopf, Knopff
- Knoepffler, Knoepfler, Knöppel/Knoeppel, Knopper, Knoppers, Knöpfle, Knopfler
- Knuppe, Knüppel/Knuppel/Knueppel
