= Knapper (surname) =

Knapper is an occupational surname associated with knapping. Notable people with the surname include:

- Andrew Knapper (born 1981), English lawn bowler
- Ben Knapper (born 1987), English football executive
- Marc Knapper (fl. from 2004), American diplomat

== See also ==
Similar surnames, possibly of different etymologies
- Knab, Knabb, Knabe, Knabl, Knap, Knape, Knapp, Knappe, Knapper
- Knep, Knepp, Knepper, Kneppers
- Knip, Knipp, Knipl, Knippel, Knipper, Knippers
- Knoop, Knop, Knope, Knopp, Knops, Knopf, Knopff
- Knoepffler, Knoepfler, Knöppel/Knoeppel, Knopper, Knoppers, Knöpfle, Knopfler
- Knuppe, Knüppel/Knuppel/Knueppel
