= Knippers =

Knippers is a German and Dutch surname. Notable people with the surname include:

- Edward Knippers, American painter
- Jan Knippers Black (1940–2021), Human rights professor

== See also ==
Similar surnames, possibly of different etymologies
- Knab, Knabb, Knabe, Knabl, Knap, Knape, Knapp, Knappe, Knapper
- Kneip, Kneipp, Knep, Knepp, Knepper, Kneppers
- Knip, Knipp, Knipl, Knippel, Knipper, Knippers
- Knoop, Knop, Knope, Knopp, Knops, Knopf, Knopff
- Knoepffler, Knoepfler, Knöppel/Knoeppel, Knopper, Knoppers, Knöpfle, Knopfler
- Knuppe, Knüppel/Knuppel/Knueppel
