= Knipp (surname) =

Knipp is a German and Dutch surname. Notable people with the surname include:

- Chuck Knipp (born 1961), Canadian-American comedian
- Russell Knipp (1942–2006), American weightlifter

== See also ==
- Knipping

Similar surnames, possibly of different etymologies
- Knab, Knabb, Knabe, Knabl, Knap, Knape, Knapp, Knappe, Knapper
- Knep, Knepp, Knepper, Kneppers
- Knip, Knipp, Knipl, Knippel, Knipper, Knippers
- Knoop, Knop, Knope, Knopp, Knops, Knopf, Knopff, Knöppel, Knopper, Knoppers, Knöpfle, Knopfler
- Knuppe, Knüppel/Knuppel/Knueppel,
