= Knuppel =

Knuppel, Knüppel, or Knueppel is a surname of German origin. Notable people with the surname include:

- August Knuppel (1857-1929), German-born American mason, contractor and politician
- Bernd Knuppel (born 1962), Uruguayan sailor
- Dominique Knüppel (born 1993), Uruguayan sailor
- John Linebaugh Knuppel (1923-1986), American politician
- Kager Knueppel, American basketball player
- Kon Knueppel (born 2005), American professional basketball player

== See also ==
Similar surnames, possibly of different etymologies
- Knab, Knabb, Knabe, Knabl, Knap, Knape, Knapp, Knappe, Knapper
- Kneip, Kneipp, Knep, Knepp, Knepper, Kneppers
- Knip, Knipp, Knipl, Knippel, Knipper, Knippers
- Knoop, Knop, Knope, Knopp, Knops, Knopf, Knopff
- Knoepffler, Knoepfler, Knöppel/Knoeppel, Knopper, Knoppers, Knöpfle, Knopfler
- Knuppe, Knüppel/Knuppel/Knueppel
