= Knop =

Knop, Knopp, or Knops are variations of a surname of Dutch, English, Jewish, and German origin. Notable people with the surname include:

== Knop ==
- Adolf Knop (1828–1893), German geologist and mineralogist
- Alex Knopp (born 1947), American professor and former politician
- Carsten Knop (born 1969), German journalist
- Guenter Knop (born 1954), German photographer
- Ian Knop, Australian businessman
- Oscar Knop (1896–1952), American football player
- Petr Knop (born 1994), Czech cross country skier

== Knopp ==
- Fay Honey Knopp (1918–1995), American Quaker minister, peace and civil rights advocate
- Gary Knopp (1957–2020), American politician
- Guido Knopp (born 1948), German journalist and author
- Josef Knopp (born 2004), Czech racing driver
- Konrad Knopp (1882–1957), German mathematician
- Marvin Knopp (1933–2011), American mathematician
- Otto A. Knopp (1877–1946), German-American innovator of the standard testing transformer
- Tim Knopp (born 1965), American politician and businessman
- Wilhelm Knop (1817–1891), German agrochemist

== Knops ==
- Kjell Knops (born 1987), Dutch footballer
- Raymond Knops (born 1971), Dutch politician
- Yvonne de Knops, better known as Yvonne George (1896–1930), Belgian singer and actress

== See also ==
Similar surnames, possibly of different etymologies
- Knab, Knabb, Knabe, Knäbel/Knaebel, Knabl, Knap, Knape, Knapp, Knappe, Knapper
- Knebel, Kneip, Kneipp, Knep, Knepp, Knepper, Kneppers
- Knip, Knipp, Knipl, Knippel, Knipper, Knippers, Knitel, Knittel
- Knobe, Knobel, Knobl, Knoop, Knop, Knope, Knopp, Knops, Knopf/Knopff
- Knoepffler, Knoepfler, Knöppel/Knoeppel, Knopper, Knoppers, Knöpfle, Knopfler
- Knuppe, Knüppel/Knuppel/Knueppel, Knuttel
