= Knuppe =

Knuppe, Knüppe, or Knueppe is a surname of Germanic origin. Notable people with the surname include:

- Franziska Knuppe (born 1974), German model and actress
- Kerry Knuppe, Native American actress, playwright, & screenwriter in film, television, & theatre
- Ruud Knuppe, Dutch canoeist

== See also ==
Similar surnames, possibly of different etymologies
- Knab, Knabb, Knabe, Knabl, Knap, Knape, Knapp, Knappe, Knapper
- Knep, Knepp, Knepper, Kneppers
- Knip, Knipp, Knipl, Knippel, Knipper, Knippers
- Knoop, Knop, Knope, Knopp, Knops, Knopf, Knopff
- Knoepffler, Knoepfler, Knöppel/Knoeppel, Knopper, Knoppers, Knöpfle, Knopfler
- Knupp, Knuppe, Knüppel/Knuppel/Knueppel
