= Knipper =

Knipper is a surname. Notable people with the surname include:

- Billy Knipper (1882–1968), American race car driver
- Lev Knipper (1898–1974), Russian composer, nephew of Olga
- Olga Knipper (1868–1959), Russian and Soviet stage actress

== See also ==
Similar surnames, possibly of different etymologies
- Knab, Knabb, Knabe, Knabl, Knap, Knape, Knapp, Knappe, Knapper
- Knep, Knepp, Knepper, Kneppers
- Knip, Knipp, Knipl, Knippel, Knipper, Knippers
- Knoop, Knop, Knope, Knopp, Knops, Knopf, Knopff, Knöppel, Knopper, Knoppers, Knöpfle, Knopfler
- Knuppe, Knüppel/Knuppel/Knueppel,
