= Knabe =

Knabe is a German surname originally literally meaning "young attendant, servant, squire". Nowadays, but becoming outdated, in German a "Knabe" is about 10 to 15 years old boy. Notable people with the surname include:

- Don Knabe (born 1943), American politician
- Hubertus Knabe (born 1959), German historian
- Kerstin Knabe (born 1959), German athlete
- Morgan Knabe (born 1981), breaststroke swimmer from Canada
- Otto Knabe (1884–1961), American baseball player
- Sebastian Knabe (born 1978), German decathlete
- Stefan Knabe (born 1963), Olympic sailor from West Germany
- Wilhelm Knabe (1923–2021), German ecologist, pacifist, civil servant and politician
- Wm. Knabe & Co., piano manufacturing company founded by Wilhelm Knabe (1803 - 1864)
- Wolfgang Knabe (born 1959), German athlete
- Eva Schulze-Knabe (1907–1976), German painter

== See also ==
Similar surnames, possibly of different etymologies
- Knab, Knabb, Knabe, Knäbel/Knaebel, Knabl, Knap, Knape, Knapp, Knappe, Knapper
- Knebel, Kneip, Kneipp, Knep, Knepp, Knepper, Kneppers
- Knip, Knipp, Knipl, Knippel, Knipper, Knippers, Knitel, Knittel
- Knobe, Knobel, Knobl, Knoop, Knop, Knope, Knopp, Knops, Knopf/Knopff
- Knoepffler, Knoepfler, Knöppel/Knoeppel, Knopper, Knoppers, Knöpfle, Knopfler
- Knuppe, Knüppel/Knuppel/Knueppel, Knuttel
