= Knepp =

Knepp may refer to:

== Places ==
- Knepp Castle, west of the village of West Grinstead, West Sussex, England
- Knepp Wildland, lowland rewilding project near Knepp Castle

== People ==
- Elizabeth Knepp (died 1681), English actress, singer, and dancer
- James R. Knepp II (born 1964), judge of the United States District Court for the Northern District of Ohio
- Mary Knepp (died 1681), English actress
- Natalie Knepp (fl. 2010s–2020s), American actress

== See also ==
- Schnitz un knepp, main dish item in the cuisine of the Pennsylvania Dutch
- KNEP, television station in Sidney, Nebraska
- Kneep, village on the Isle of Lewis, in the Outer Hebrides, Scotland

Similar surnames, possibly of different etymologies
- Knab, Knabb, Knabe, Knabl, Knap, Knape, Knapp, Knappe, Knapper
- Knep, Knepp, Knepper, Kneppers
- Knip, Knipp, Knipl, Knippel, Knipper, Knippers
- Knoop, Knop, Knope, Knopp, Knops, Knopf, Knopff, Knöppel, Knopper, Knoppers, Knöpfle, Knopfler
- Knuppe, Knüppel/Knuppel/Knueppel, Knueppel
