= Knip =

Knip is a surname. Notable people with the surname include:

- Joseph August Knip (1777-1847), Dutch painter
- Henriëtte Geertruida Knip, Dutch flower painter
- Henriëtte Ronner-Knip, Dutch painter and her niece
- Kirsten Knip (born 1992), Dutch volleyball player
- Pauline Knip or Pauline Rifer de Courcelles (1781–1851), French bird artist

== See also ==
Similar surnames, possibly of different etymologies
- Knab, Knabb, Knabe, Knabl, Knap, Knape, Knapp, Knappe, Knapper
- Knep, Knepp, Knepper, Kneppers
- Knip, Knipp, Knipl, Knippel, Knipper, Knippers
- Knoop, Knop, Knope, Knopp, Knops, Knopf, Knopff, Knöppel, Knopper, Knoppers, Knöpfle, Knopfler
- Knuppe, Knüppel/Knuppel/Knueppel,
