= Kneppers =

Kneppers is a Dutch surname. Notable people with the surname include:

- Andrea Kneppers (born 1993), Dutch swimmer
- Daan Kneppers, Dutch hurdler
- Mark Kneppers of the Dutch band Kraak & Smaak
- Oscar Kneppers, founder of Webwereld – Dutch IT news website (1995–2020)

== See also ==
Similar surnames, possibly of different etymologies
- Knab, Knabb, Knabe, Knabl, Knap, Knape, Knapp, Knappe, Knapper
- Knep, Knepp, Knepper, Kneppers
- Knip, Knipp, Knipl, Knippel, Knipper, Knippers
- Knoop, Knop, Knope, Knopp, Knops, Knopf, Knopff, Knöppel, Knopper, Knoppers, Knöpfle, Knopfler
- Knuppe, Knüppel/Knuppel/Knueppel, Knueppel
