= Knepper =

Knepper is a surname. Notable people with the surname include:

- Émile Knepper (1892–1978), Luxembourgian gymnast who competed in the 1912 Summer Olympics
- Arnie Knepper (1930–1992), American racecar driver
- Bob Knepper (born 1954), former pitcher in Major League Baseball with a 15-year career from 1976 to 1990
- Charlie Knepper (1871–1946), Major League Baseball player, a right-handed pitcher who batted from the right side
- James Knepper (1932–2016), former Republican member of the Pennsylvania House of Representatives
- Jean-Bernard Knepper (1638–1698), Luxembourg advocat and notary, and from 1693 to 1698 the Mayor of the City of Luxembourg
- Jimmy Knepper (1927–2003), American jazz trombonist
- Paul H. Knepper, aircraft engineer from Tamaqua, PA
- Robert Knepper (born 1959), American actor

== See also ==
Similar surnames, possibly of different etymologies
- Knab, Knabb, Knabe, Knabl, Knap, Knape, Knapp, Knappe, Knapper
- Knep, Knepp, Knepper, Kneppers
- Knip, Knipp, Knipl, Knippel, Knipper, Knippers
- Knoop, Knop, Knope, Knopp, Knops, Knopf, Knopff, Knöppel, Knopper, Knoppers, Knöpfle, Knopfler
- Knuppe, Knüppel/Knuppel/Knueppel, Knueppel
