= Andrew Weil =

American physician and author (born 1942)

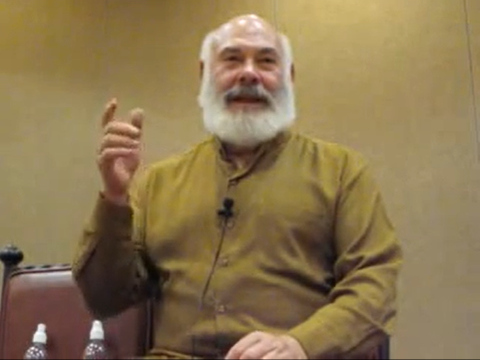
- Weil in 2015
- Born: Andrew Thomas Weil; June 8, 1942 (age 84); Philadelphia, Pennsylvania, U.S.
- Education: Harvard University
- Occupations: Medical doctor, author

Andrew Thomas Weil (/waɪl/; born June 8, 1942) is an American physician and author known for advocating integrative medicine, an approach that combines conventional medical treatment with selected complementary and alternative therapies. He founded the Arizona Center for Integrative Medicine at the University of Arizona College of Medicine in 1994. Weil has also written numerous popular books on health, healing, nutrition and ageing, several of which have appeared on bestseller lists.

Weil studied biology and ethnobotany at Harvard University and received his medical degree from Harvard Medical School in 1968. His early interests included psychoactive drugs, medicinal plants and altered states of consciousness. After medical school, he conducted research on marijuana and other drugs at the National Institute of Mental Health, was affiliated with the Harvard Botanical Museum from 1971 to 1984, and travelled in Latin America and elsewhere studying medicinal plants and indigenous healing practices. His early books dealt largely with drugs and consciousness before his writing shifted toward health care and healthy lifestyles.

Weil describes integrative medicine as combining conventional medicine with complementary approaches while emphasizing nutrition, exercise, stress reduction and the physician–patient relationship. He has promoted dietary supplements, herbal remedies, meditation and other practices alongside conventional treatment, and has been credited with helping to popularize integrative medicine. He also founded the restaurant chain True Food Kitchen and has developed other commercial ventures associated with his health recommendations.

Weil's medical advice and commercial activities have attracted substantial criticism. Physicians and other critics have accused him of promoting treatments lacking adequate evidence and of disparaging aspects of evidence-based medicine. His business relationships and sales of supplements have also led to criticism over potential conflicts between his medical recommendations and commercial interests. In 2009, the Food and Drug Administration sent a warning letter to Weil Lifestyle LLC concerning the marketing of products in connection with the H1N1 influenza virus.

== Early life and education ==
Weil was born in Philadelphia, on June 8, 1942, the only child of parents who operated a millinery store, in a family that was Reform Jewish. He graduated from Central High School (Philadelphia) in 1959, and was awarded a scholarship from the American Association for the United Nations, giving him the opportunity to go abroad for a year, during which he lived with families in India, Thailand, and Greece. From this experience, he became convinced that American culture and science was insular and unaware of non-American practices. He began hearing that mescaline enhanced creativity and produced visionary experiences, and finding little information on the subject, he read The Doors of Perception by Aldous Huxley.

In 1960, Weil entered Harvard University, where he majored in biology with a concentration in ethnobotany. At Harvard, he developed curiosity about psychoactive drugs. He met Harvard psychologists Timothy Leary and Richard Alpert, and separately engaged in organized experimentation with mescaline. Weil wrote for Harvard Crimson. One published account of the period describes a falling out of Weil from the group that included the faculty—among whom the experimentation with drugs was contentious, and with regard to undergraduates, proscribed; the falling out involved an exposé on drug-use and supply that Weil wrote for the Crimson. Weil wrote of faculty experimentation with drugs in a series of Crimson pieces:

- "Better Than a Damn" (February 20, 1962), his apparent first Crimson piece;
- "Alpert Defends Drugs on 'Open End'" (May 27, 1963); and
- "Investigation Unlikely in Dismissal of Alpert" (May 29, 1963).

and that this reporting included the claim that "undergraduates had indeed been able to obtain access to psilocybin from members" of the Harvard faculty research team that was involved in such research. As late as 1973, Weil's name appears in conjunction with an editorial regarding the 1963 firing of Alpert, which stated the view that it would be "unfortunate if the firing of Richard Alpert led to the suppression of legitimate research into the effects of hallucinogenic compounds", distancing himself and the Crimson from the "shoddiness of their work as scientists ... less [the result] of incompetence than of a conscious rejection of scientific ways of looking at things".

Weil's undergraduate thesis was titled "The Use of Nutmeg as a Psychotropic Agent", specifically, on the narcotic properties of nutmeg. In 1964, he graduated cum laude with a B.A. in biology.

=== Medical training ===
Weil entered Harvard Medical School, "not with the intention of becoming a physician but rather simply to obtain a medical education". He received a medical degree in 1968, although "the Harvard faculty ... threatened to withhold it because of a controversial marijuana study Weil had helped conduct" in his final year. Weil moved to San Francisco and completed a one-year medical internship at Mount Zion Hospital in 1968–69. While there, he volunteered at the Haight-Ashbury Free Clinic. Weil went on to complete one year of a two-year program at NIH, resigning due to "official opposition to his work with marijuana."

== Career ==
Following his internship, Weil took a position with the National Institute of Mental Health (NIMH) that lasted approximately one year, to pursue his interests in research on marijuana and other drugs; during this time he may have received formal institutional permission to acquire marijuana for the research.

Weil is reported to have experienced opposition to this line of inquiry at the NIMH, to have departed to his rural northern Virginia home (1971-1972), and to have begun his practices of vegetarianism, yoga, and meditation, and work on writing The Natural Mind (1972). At the same time, Weil began an affiliation with the Harvard Botanical Museum that would span from 1971 to 1984, where his work included duties as a research associate investigating "the properties of medicinal and psychoactive plants." His interests led him to explore the healing systems of indigenous people, and with this aim, Weil traveled throughout South America and other parts of the world, "collecting information about medicinal plants and healing," from 1971 to 1975, as a fellow for the Institute of Current World Affairs.

In 1994, Weil founded the Arizona Center for Integrative Medicine at the University of Arizona College of Medicine in Tucson, Arizona.

Andrew Weil is the founder of True Food Kitchen, a restaurant chain serving meals on the premise that food should make one feel better. There are currently 44 restaurants in the chain.

Weil is credited with popularizing the 4-7-8 breathing technique.

== View of conventional medicine ==
Evidence-based medicine is a stated central component of the higher-order "system of systems" Weil envisions integrative medicine to be. It is clear that in both scholarly/academic and popular settings, Weil's statements suggest practices from alternative therapies as being something to add to conventional medical treatment plans. However, Weil is also on record speaking disparagingly of conventional, evidence-based medicine, both in academic and popular contexts. For instance, he is quoted as having said to a group commencing after a month-long training program in integrative medicine at the Arizona Center for Integrative Medicine that "that evidence-based medicine, at its worst, 'is exactly analogous to religious fundamentalism'" (though the source leaves unclear whether any specific aspect of evidence-based medicine was given).

== Influences and philosophy ==
Weil acknowledges many experiences and individuals that have influenced his philosophical and spiritual ideas, and the techniques he considers valid in his approach to medicine. Weil has been open about his own history of experimental and recreational drug use, including experiences with narcotics and mind-altering substances. Among the individuals who strongly influenced his personal and professional life is the late osteopath Robert C. Fulford, who specialized in cranial manipulation. Weil has further stated that he respects the work of psychologist Martin Seligman, who pioneered the field of positive psychology and now directs the Positive Psychology Center at the University of Pennsylvania. Weil has also professed admiration for the work of Stephen Ilardi, professor of psychology at the University of Kansas, and author of The Depression Cure.

Weil is widely recognized as having a seminal role in establishing the field of integrative medicine, where this field is defined as:

a higher-order system of systems of care that emphasizes wellness and healing of the entire person (bio-psycho-socio-spiritual dimensions) as primary goals, drawing on both conventional and CAM [complementary and alternative medicine] approaches in the context of a supportive and effective physician-patient relationship.

He says that patients are urged to take the Western medicine prescribed by their physicians, and—in what Publishers Weekly describes as a message "becoming a signature formula"— "bend the 'biomedical model' [conventional, evidence-based medicine] to incorporate alternative therapies, including supplements like omega-3 fatty acids, vitamin D, and herbal remedies; [and] meditation and other 'spiritual' strategies." Proper nutrition, exercise, and stress reduction are also emphasized by Weil. In particular, he is a proponent of diets that are rich in organic fruits, organic vegetables, and fish, and is a vocal critic of foods and diets rich in partially hydrogenated oils. In an interview on Larry King Live, Weil focused on a view that sugar, starch, refined carbohydrates, and trans-fats are more dangerous to the human body than saturated fats.

Regarding treatment strategies, their side effects, and their efficacy, Weil advocates for the use of whole plants as a less problematic approach in comparison to synthetic pharmaceuticals. In addition, Weil is an advocate of incorporating specific medicinal mushrooms into one's diet.

Weil has expressed opposition to the war on drugs, and takes a measured, nuanced approach to the use of recreational drugs.

== Publications ==
=== Overview ===
While Weil's early books and publications primarily explored altered states of consciousness, he has since expanded the scope of his work to encompass healthy lifestyles and health care in general. In the last ten years, Weil has focused much of his work on the health concerns of older people. In his book Healthy Aging, Weil looks at the process of growing older from a physical, social, and cross-cultural perspective, and in his book Why our Health Matters is focused on health care reform.

Of his books, several have appeared on various bestseller lists, both as hardbacks and as paperbacks (many appearing so in the 1990s), some of them being Spontaneous Healing (1995; on the New York Times list), Eight Weeks to Optimum Health (1997; on the Publishers Weekly and New York Times lists), Eating Well for Optimum Health (2000; Publishers Weekly, New York Times), The Healthy Kitchen (2002, with chef Rosie Daley; New York Times), Healthy Aging (2005; New York Times), and Spontaneous Happiness (2011; New York Times).

=== List of popular works ===
==== Books ====
- The Natural Mind: An Investigation of Drugs and the Higher Consciousness (1972, rev. 2004);ISBN 0-618-47905-8
- The Marriage of the Sun and Moon: A Quest for Unity in Consciousness (Houghton Mifflin Company: 1980); ISBN 0-395-25723-9
- Health and Healing (1983, rev. 2004);ISBN 0-618-47908-2
- From Chocolate to Morphine: Everything you need to know about mind-altering drugs with Winifred Rosen (1983, rev. 1993 & 2004); ISBN 0-618-48379-9
- Natural Health, Natural Medicine (1990, rev. 2004);ISBN 0-618-47903-1
- Spontaneous Healing (Ballantine: 1995); ISBN 0-8041-1794-2
- Eight Weeks to Optimum Health (1997, rev. 2006);ISBN 978-0-345-49802-1
- Eating Well for Optimum Health (2000);ISBN 0-375-40754-5
- The Healthy Kitchen with Rosie Daley (2002);ISBN 0-375-41306-5
- Healthy Aging (2005);ISBN 0-375-40755-3
- Why Our Health Matters (2009)ISBN 978-1-59463-066-8
- Spontaneous Happiness (2011)ISBN 978-0-316-12942-8
- True Food: Seasonal, Sustainable, Simple, Pure (2014)ISBN 978-0-316-12941-1
- Fast Food, Good Food: More Than 150 Quick and Easy Ways to Put Healthy, Delicious Food on the Table (2015)ISBN 978-0-316-32942-2

==== James Beard Awards ====
Nominated

- (2013) Focus on Health (True Food: Seasonal, Sustainable, Simple, Pure)
- (2003) Vegetarian/Health Focus (The Healthy Kitchen)

==== Ask Dr. Weil collections ====
Published collections of answers to questions received on his DrWeil.com website:

- Women's Health ISBN 0-8041-1674-1
- Healthy Living ISBN 0-7515-2476-X
- Natural Remedies ISBN 0-8041-1675-X
- Common Illnesses ISBN 0-8041-1676-8
- Vitamins and Minerals ISBN 0-8041-1672-5
- Your Top Health Concerns ISBN 0-7515-2606-1

==== Audio-only publications ====
- Breathing: The Master Key to Self Healing, audio CD, Sounds True (2000).

=== Academic works ===
As of 2015, Weil was serving as series editor of an academic imprint from Oxford University Press called the Weil Integrative Medicine Library, volumes for clinicians in more than 10 medical specialties, including oncology, cardiology, rheumatology, pediatrics, and psychology. Weil co-edited the first volume, Integrative Oncology, with Donald Abrams, which appeared in 2009. Academic and scholarly reviews of the series and individual volumes were lacking as of 2015—in almost all cases, the publisher's "Reviews and Awards" tabs lack society or other published reviews (apart from Doody's). A cancer society review of the second edition of the series' Integrative Oncology volume, the first volume to have been published, describes the field as "an exciting new discipline" and the book as offering "best-practice methods to prevent cancer and support those affected by it on all levels: body, mind, and spirit" and as being comprehensive, and offering "meticulous, well-written chapters on proven and yet-to-be-proven methods for enhancing cancer care with integrative oncology."

=== Other works ===
Weil was a regular contributor to High Times magazine from 1975 to 1983. More recently, Weil has written the forewords to a variety of books, including Paul Stamets's Psilocybin Mushrooms of the World and Lewis Mehl-Madrona's Coyote Medicine. In the 21st century, Weil has occasionally written articles for Time magazine.

== Critiques and controversies ==
=== Medical ===
Medical professionals in particular have criticized Weil for promoting treatment claims and alternative medicine practices described as unverified or inefficacious, or for otherwise rejecting aspects of evidence-based medicine. Weil's rejection of some aspects of evidence-based medicine and his promotion of alternative medicine practices that are not verifiably efficacious were criticized in a 1998 New Republic piece by Arnold S. Relman, emeritus editor-in-chief of The New England Journal of Medicine and emeritus professor of medicine at Harvard Medical School. The late Barry Beyerstein of Simon Fraser University, writing in the journal Academic Medicine in 2001, criticized Weil and various aspects of complementary and alternative medicine, asserting that it held a "magical world-view"; he continued, saying,

On advocating emotional criteria for truth over criteria based on empirical data and logic, New Age medical gurus such as Andrew Weil ... have convinced many that "anything goes" ... By denigrating science, these detractors have enlarged the potential following for magical and pseudoscientific health products.

In 2003, Steven Knope, author of The Body/Mind Connection (2000), a physician trained at Weill Cornell Medical College, and former Chair of the Department of Medicine in the Tucson, Arizona, Carondelet system, criticized Weil in a televised discussion for what he considered irresponsible advocacy of untested treatments. Simon Singh, a recognized British science writer, and Edzard Ernst, a former Professor of Complementary Medicine at the University of Exeter, echoed Beyerstein's criticism in their 2008 book Trick or Treatment, saying that although Weil correctly promotes exercise and smoke-free lifestyles "much of his advice is nonsense."

=== Social ===
Hans Baer of the Department of Sociology and Anthropology at the University of Arkansas, writing in 2003, has argued that Weil's approach represents a general limitation of the holistic health/New Age movement, in its "tendenc[y] to downplay the role of social, structural, and environmental factors in the etiology of disease" in the United States, and in doing so, represents a failure to "suggest substantive remedies for improving access to health care," generally, for the "millions of people who lack any type of health insurance"; at the same time, Baer notes (with negative connotations) that Weil instead contributes "to a long tradition of entrepreneurialism in the U.S. medical system."

=== Ethical ===
Beginning in 2006, as the result of his commercial ventures, Weil—as David Gumpert has described—has placed himself in the "awkward position of ... having to defend himself against charges of inappropriately exploiting his medical-celebrity status." Commenting on a cover article in a recent 2006 edition of the Center for Science in the Public Interest's "highly respected" Nutrition Action Healthletter, Gumpert called attention to:

- a $14 million deal Weil's business enterprise had made with drugstore.com,
- the DrWeil.com personalized service of recommending supplements (purchase of which are made easy via DrWeil.com and drugstore.com),
- long-standing recommendations for supplements appearing despite studies questioning their efficacy, and to
- the clear nature of the pressures on Weil because of the deals, and the clear consanguinity of person and brand.

The Forbes article noted, in particular, drugstore.com's 2005 lawsuit against DrWeil.com for Weil's having "failed to perform any of his marketing obligations," noting that in a 2004 Larry King Live interview, Weil failed to promote this business partner, despite the program offering "reasonable opportunity for Weil to use efforts to promote drugstore.com." Moreover, the CSPI's newsletter noted that their investigations into the vitamin and supplement recommendation service led them to conclude that the algorithms behind the recommendations were, by default, set to recommend purchases: regardless of how the online inquiries of the personalized service were answered, "we couldn't get the Advisor to stop recommending that we buy supplements." The CSPI article concludes, "Beware of doctors who sell what they recommend."

In 2006, the Center for Science in the Public Interest also commented on a Time magazine piece by Weil rebutting a recent JAMA report on the failure of fish oil supplements to significantly reduce risk of serious heart arrhythmias, where he emphasized the benefits of fish oil supplements without a disclaimer that he had a direct commercial interest in the sale of these supplements.

Another specific criticism has been leveled with regard to the message of his Healthy Aging (2005), which argues that aging should be accepted as a natural stage in life, while these skin care products were being sold at Macy's with the advertising claim of the products' "optimiz[ing] skin's defense against aging"—alongside a large picture of Weil.

Weil has also been accused by others in the alternative health movement of being involved in the "dishonest practice of spreading fear, uncertainty, and doubt about competitors' products, while pretending to be [an] objective 3rd [party]."

=== Political ===
Weil's 1983 Chocolate to Morphine roused the ire of Florida senator Paula Hawkins, "who demanded that the book, a veritable encyclopaedia of various drugs and their effects on humans, be removed from schools and libraries."

== Formal corrective actions ==
In 2009, the US Food and Drug Administration sent a warning letter to Weil's Weil Lifestyle LLC, regarding "Unapproved / Uncleared / Unauthorized Products Related to the H1N1 Flu Virus" in particular, a "Notice of Potential Illegal Marketing of Products to Prevent, Treat or Cure the H1N1 Virus H1N1 [influenza] Virus."

== Awards and recognition ==
Weil appeared on the cover of Time magazine in 1997 and again in 2005, and Time named him one of the 25 most influential Americans in 1997 and one of the 100 most influential people in the world in 2005. He was inducted into the Academy of Achievement in 1998. His "Ask Dr. Weil" website was chosen by Forbes' Best of the Web Directory in 2009 for having offered "straightforward tips and advice on achieving wellness through natural means and educating the public on alternative therapies." The Integrative Healthcare Symposium (IHS) awarded Weil as the recipient of its 2022 Leadership Award.

== Media appearances ==
Weil blogs for the Huffington Post and has been a frequent guest on Larry King Live on CNN, Oprah, and The Today Show. Weil appeared in the 2012 documentary on the need for a "rescue" of American healthcare, Escape Fire. He also appeared in the 2019 documentary Fantastic Fungi.
