= Knöppel (surname) =

Knöppel, Knoppel, or Knoeppel is a Germanic surname. The word is a variant of Knöpfel, "button", "knob", a diminutive of "Knopf". Notable people with the surname include:

- Arvid Knöppel (sport shooter), Swedish sport shooter
- Arvid Knöppel (sculptor), Swedish sculptor
- Charles Edward Knoeppel, American organizational theorist

== See also ==
Similar surnames, possibly of different etymologies
- Knab, Knabb, Knabe, Knabl, Knap, Knape, Knapp, Knappe, Knapper
- Knep, Knepp, Knepper, Kneppers
- Knip, Knipp, Knipl, Knippel, Knipper, Knippers
- Knoop, Knop, Knope, Knopp, Knops, Knopf, Knopff, Knöppel, Knopper, Knoppers, Knöpfle, Knopfler
- Knuppe, Knüppel/Knuppel/Knueppel,
