= Robert Fulford =

Robert Fulford may refer to:

- Robert Fulford (journalist) (1932–2024), Canadian journalist, magazine editor, and essayist
- Robert Fulford (croquet player) (born 1969), English croquet player
- Robert C. Fulford (1905–1997), American osteopath
- Robert Fulford Ruttan (1856–1937), Canadian chemist
