= Nops =

Nops or NOPS may refer to:

- Nops (spider), a genus of spider of the family Caponiidae
- Gymnallabes nops, a species of catfish
- Jerry Nops (1875—1937), American baseball player
- Middlesbrough Ironopolis F.C.
- New Orleans Public Schools
- Nokian Palloseura

== See also ==
- NOP (disambiguation)
