= KNIP =

KNIP may refer to:

- Central Indonesian National Committee (in Indonesian, Komite Nasional Indonesia Pusat)
- the ICAO code for Naval Air Station Jacksonville, in Jacksonville, Florida, United States
- Knip, a surname
