= Frankfurter Allgemeine Zeitung =

German daily newspaper

- The 17 September 2010 front page
- Type: Daily newspaper
- Format: Nordisch
- Owner: Fazit-Stiftung
- Publisher: Carsten Knop; Berthold Kohler; Jürgen Kaube; Gerald Braunberger
- Founded: 1 November 1949; 77 years ago
- Political alignment: Liberal conservatism Conservative liberalism Centre-right; Pro-CDU/CSU
- Language: German
- Headquarters: Frankfurt, Germany
- Circulation: 201,408 (Print, 2021); 56,000 (Digital, 2020)
- ISSN: 0174-4909
- Website: www.faz.net

The Frankfurter Allgemeine Zeitung (German: [ˈfʁaŋkfʊʁtɐ ʔalɡəˈmaɪnə ˈtsaɪtʊŋ]; FAZ; lit. 'Frankfurt General Newspaper') is a German newspaper founded in 1949. It is published daily in Frankfurt and is considered a newspaper of record for Germany. Its Sunday edition is the Frankfurter Allgemeine Sonntagszeitung ([- ˈzɔntaːksˌtsaɪtʊŋ]; FAS).

The paper runs its own network of correspondents. Its editorial policy is not determined by a single editor, but cooperatively by four editors.

== History ==
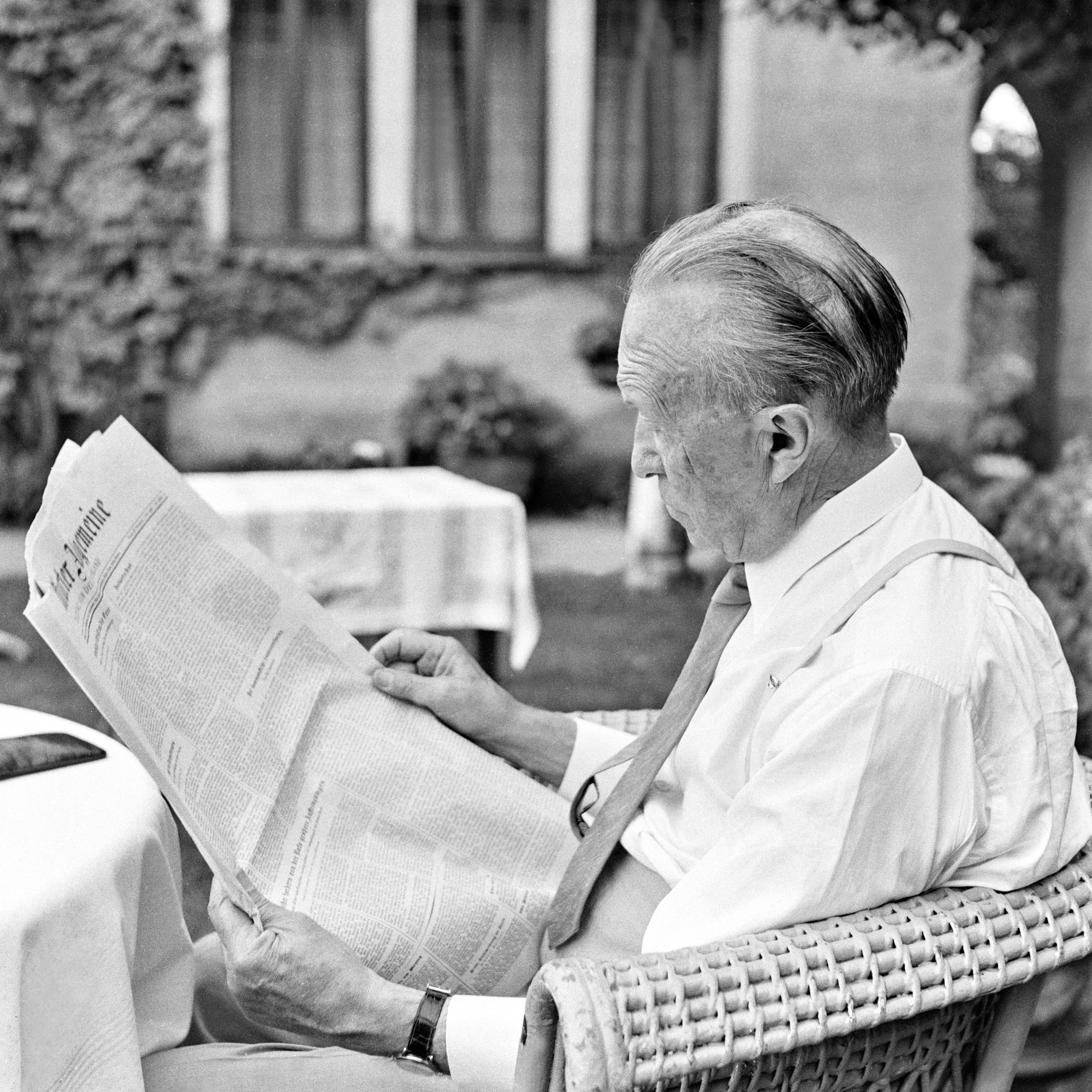
Konrad Adenauer reading the FAZ in 1961

The first edition of the FAZ appeared on 1 November 1949; its founding editors were Hans Baumgarten, Erich Dombrowski, Karl Korn, Paul Sethe and Erich Welter. Welter acted as editor until 1980. Some editors had worked for the moderate Frankfurter Zeitung, which had been banned in 1943. However, in their first issue, the FAZ editorial expressly refuted the notion of being the earlier paper's successor, or of continuing its legacy:

Arising from the fact that some of our colleagues previously were members of the Frankfurter Zeitung, it often has been suggested an attempt was being made here to be the successor to that newspaper. Such an assumption misjudges our intentions. Like everyone, we too admired the high quality of that paper; ... however, showing respect for an outstanding achievement does not imply a desire to copy it.

— FAZ Editorial board, Dohrendorf, 1990.

Until 30 September 1950, the FAZ was printed in Mainz.

Traditionally, many of the headlines in the FAZ were styled in blackletter format, and no photographs appeared on the title page. Some of the rare exceptions were a picture of celebrating people in front of the Berlin Reichstag on 4 October 1990 (German Unity Day), and two pictures in the edition on 12 September 2001 (one day after the September 11 attacks) showing the collapsing World Trade Center and American president George W. Bush.

In the early 2000s, FAZ expanded aggressively, with customized sections for Berlin and Munich. An eight-page six-day-a-week English-language edition was distributed as an insert in The International Herald Tribune (which is owned by The New York Times Company); the articles were selected and translated from the same day's edition of the parent newspaper by the FAZ staff in Frankfurt. However, FAZ group suffered a loss of 60.6 million euros in 2002. By 2004, the customized sections were scrapped. The English edition shrank to a tabloid published once a week.

On 5 October 2007, the FAZ altered its traditional layout to include color photographs on the front page, and replaced blackletter typeface outside the nameplate. Due to its traditionally sober layout, the introduction of color photographs was controversially discussed by FAZ readers, becoming the subject of a 2009 comedy film.

As of 2024, the FAZ is produced electronically using the IBM Networked Interactive Content Access (NICA) software and Unisys Hermes. For its characteristic comment headings, a digital Fraktur font was ordered. This font has since been abandoned, due to the above-mentioned change of layout.

After introducing the new spelling prescribed by the German orthography reform of 1996 on 1 August 1999, the paper returned to the old spelling exactly one year later, declaring that the reform had failed to achieve its primary goals of improving language mastery and strengthening the unity of the language. After several changes had been made to the new spelling, FAZ accepted it and started using it (in a custom version) on 1 January 2007.

In December 1999, future German Chancellor Angela Merkel published an article in the Frankfurter Allgemeine Zeitung, lamenting the "tragedy" that had befallen the party (CDU donations scandal), blaming former Chancellor Helmut Kohl and urging a new course. On 16 February 2000, Wolfgang Schäuble, Leader of the CDU since 7 November 1998, stepped back, and Merkel became his successor.

== Orientation ==
Its political orientation is liberal-conservative, occasionally providing a forum to commentators with different opinions.

In the 2013 elections the paper endorsed the CDU/CSU alliance.

== Ownership ==
The company has the legal form of a GmbH (company with limited liability); the independent Fazit-Stiftung Gemeinnützige Verlagsgesellschaft mbH (Fazit-Foundation) is its majority shareholder, holding 93.7% of shares. The FAZIT-Stiftung was created in 1959 by the transformation of the then FAZ owner German: Allgemeine Verlagsgesellschaft mbH into a private foundation. It is 'owned' by up to nine persons who can't sell or buy their share but have to transmit it free of charge to a successor which is co-opted by the remaining shareholders. The foundations statute prescribes that only such persons shall be co-opted as new member, who "by their standing and personality" can guarantee the "independence" of the FAZ. The current group of seven is composed of active or former CEOs, company owners, board members, and corporate lawyers. The foundation also owns more than 90% of the shares of the company 'Frankfurter Societät' which in turn is owner of the printing enterprise 'Frankfurter Societätsdruckerei' and the regional paper Frankfurter Neue Presse.

== Circulation ==
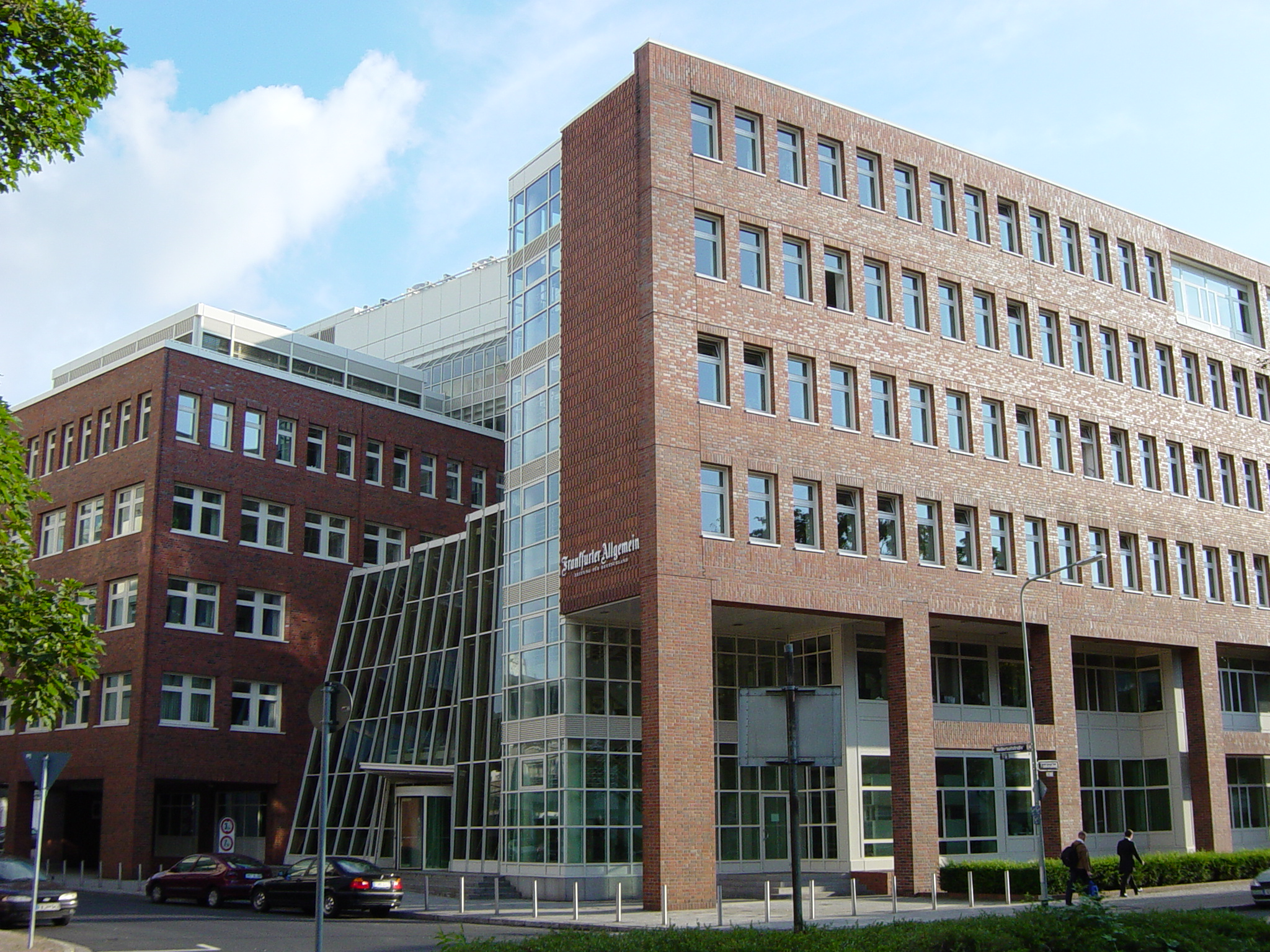
Former Editorial department building of Frankfurter Allgemeine Zeitung

The F.A.Z. is one of several high-profile national newspapers in Germany (along with Süddeutsche Zeitung, Die Zeit, Frankfurter Rundschau and Die Tageszeitung). In 2011, it counted 40 foreign correspondents among its staff. All in all, over 800 people are working for FAZ.

The 1993 circulation of the paper was 391,013 copies. In 2001, it had a circulation of 409,000 copies. The 2007 circulation of the daily edition was 382,499 copies. The 2016 (IVW II/2016) circulation of the daily edition was 256,188 copies.

== Bans ==
In 2006, the FAZ was banned in Egypt for publishing articles which were deemed as "insulting Islam". In February 2008, the paper was again banned in Egypt due to the publication of cartoons depicting Muhammad.

In November 2012, the paper provoked strong criticism in Spain because of its stance against Spanish immigration to Germany during the economic crisis.

In July 2019, the FAZ website, along with other major German media, including Spiegel Online, was blocked by China's Great Firewall. The reasons for the ban remain unclear, but FAZ believed it was possibly due to its reporting on the 2019–2020 Hong Kong protests.

== Notable contributors ==
- Muhammad Asad
- Patrick Bahners
- Hans D. Barbier
- Eleonore Büning (music critic)
- Dietmar Dath
- Marc Degens
- Karl Feldmeier
- Joachim Fest (former editor)
- Friedrich Karl Fromme (former editor)
- Greser & Lenz
- Andrea Petkovic
- Georg Paul Hefty
- Florian Illies
- Daniel Kehlmann
- Barbara Klemm (photographer)
- Carsten Knop
- Christian Kracht
- Karl Lagerfeld (designer)
- Michael Martens
- Ernst Nolte
- Andreas Platthaus
- Marcel Reich-Ranicki
- Volker Reiche (see Strizz)
- Johann Georg Reißmüller (former editor)
- Frank Schirrmacher
- Werner Spies
- Udo Ulfkotte (former editor)

== See also ==
- List of newspapers in Germany
- Media of Germany
