= Wesley M. Knapp =

US botanist

Wesley Martin Knapp is the Chief Botanist for NatureServe. Originally from New Hampshire, Knapp is an expert in North American plants belonging to the Cyperaceae (sedges) and Juncaceae (rushes). Knapp has published research in journals including: Systematic Botany, the Botanical Research Institute of Texas , Evansia, and Opuscula Philolicheum.

== Papers published ==
- Systematic Botany - Knapp, W.M. & R.F.C. Naczi 2008. Taxonomy, Morphology, and Geographic Distribution of Juncus longii (Juncaceae) Systematic Botany 33(4): 685-694
- Opuscula Philolichenum - Lendemer, J.C. & W.M. Knapp. 2007. Contributions to the Lichen Flora of Maryland: Recent Collections from the Delmarva Peninsula.
- Botanical Research Institute of Texas (Formerly SIDA) - Knapp, W.M. & D. Estes. 2006. Gratiola brevifolia (Plantaginaceae) New to the Flora of Delaware, the Delmarva Peninsula and the Mid-Atlantic. SIDA 22(1):825-829.
