= Edward Knapp =

Edward Knapp is the name of:

- Edward Alan Knapp (1932–2009), American physicist, Director of the National Science Foundation 1982–1984
- Edward Knapp-Fisher (1915–2003), Anglican bishop and scholar
- Edward F. Knapp State Airport, a Vermont airport
- Edward Spring Knapp (1879–1940), member of the American Philatelic Society Hall of Fame
- Edward Knapp (cricketer) (1848–1903), English cricketer
