= Knibb =

Knibb is a surname. Notable people with the surname include:

- John Knibb (1650–1722), English clockmaker
- Kellion Knibb (born 1993), Jamaican athlete
- Lloyd Knibb (1931–2011), Jamaican drummer
- Taylor Knibb (born 1998), American triathlete
- William Knibb (1803–1845), English Baptist minister and missionary to Jamaica

== See also ==
- Knabb
