= Dual-character concept =

Dual Character concepts (philosophy)

Dual character concepts have two independent dimensions for classification: descriptive and normative. For example, someone is descriptively an “artist” if they earn a living by painting. Normatively, someone is an “artist” only if they live up to ideals, e.g., a commitment to creating truly meaningful aesthetic work. Because these dimensions are independent, one can satisfy the descriptive criteria without fulfilling the normative ones, and vice versa. Such concepts were first explored by Joshua Knobe, Sandeep Prasada and George E Newman in 2013.

To date, the largest body of research on dual character concepts has examined social‑role concepts like “artist”, “scientist”, “colleague”, and “philosopher”. Other studies, however, indicate that even some of philosophy’s most basic concepts may exhibit a dual character structure: “art”, “gender”, “happiness”, and “human‑being”.

== Related concepts ==
- Thick concept
- Concept
