= True Food Kitchen =

American restaurant chain

- Type: Public
- Industry: Restaurant
- Genre: Casual dine-in
- Founded: 2008 in Phoenix, Arizona
- Founder: Dr. Andrew Weil and Sam Fox
- Fate: Chapter 11 bankruptcy
- Headquarters: 4455 E. Camelback Road, Suite A-115 Phoenix, Arizona, 85018
- Number of locations: 46 restaurants in the U.S. (2024)
- Area served: Arizona, California, Colorado, Florida, Georgia, Illinois, Louisiana, Maryland, Missouri, Nevada, New Jersey, New York, North Carolina, Ohio, Pennsylvania, Tennessee, Texas, Virginia
- Products: Salads, bowls, sourdough pizzas, burgers, seasonal appetizers and entrees
- Website: https://www.truefoodkitchen.com

True Food Kitchen (TFK) is an American restaurant chain that serves health-conscious food and focuses on the anti-inflammatory diet. The company was founded in 2008 in Phoenix, Arizona, by wellness author Dr. Andrew Weil and Sam Fox, CEO of Fox Restaurants Concepts.

True Food Kitchen's headquarters is located in Phoenix, Arizona. As of 2025, there are 46 restaurants in operation across the U.S. The CEO is John Williams, who was hired in 2023.

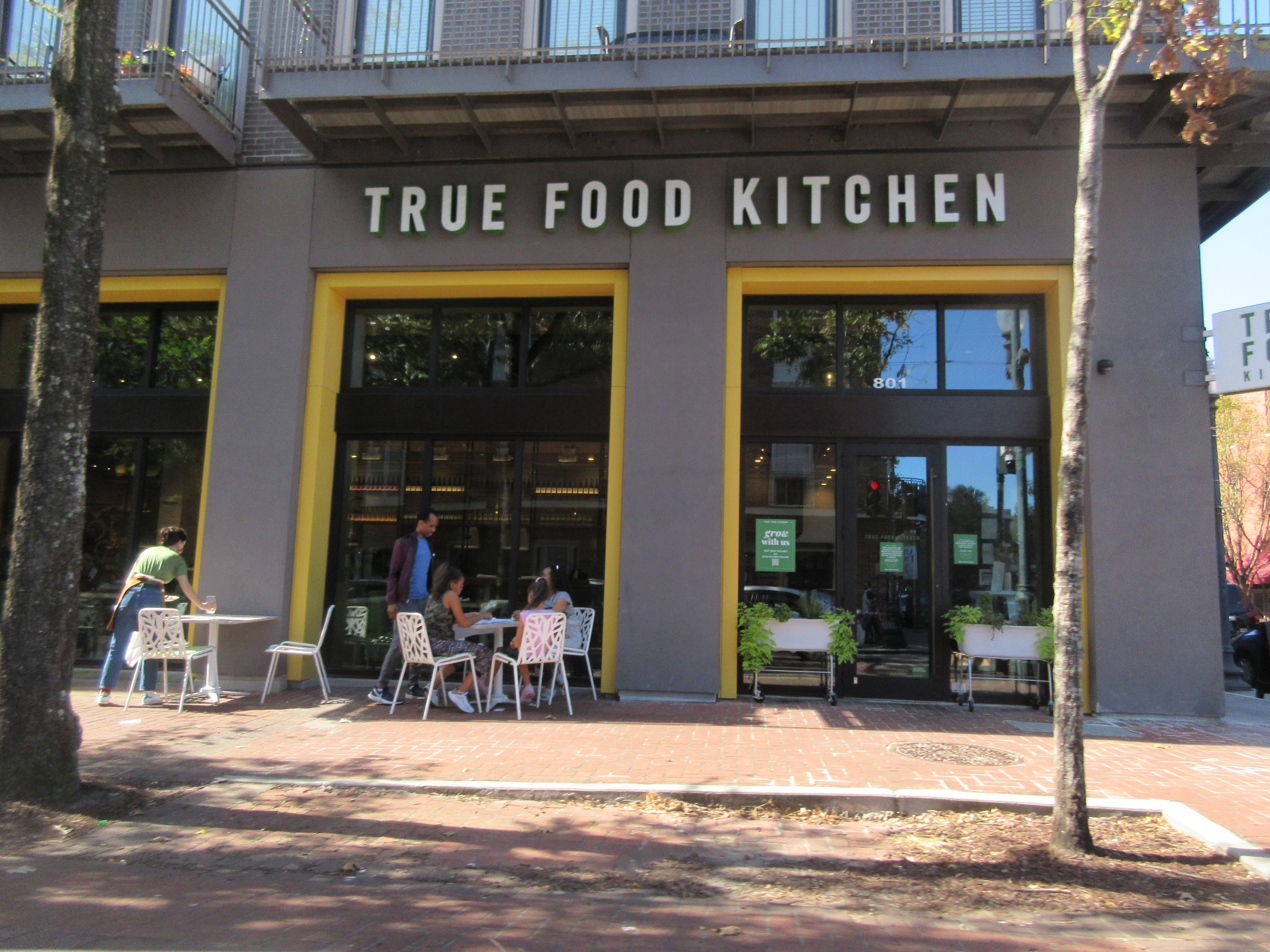

== History/corporate ==
The idea for True Food Kitchen began in 2008, when Andrew Weil was introduced to Sam Fox of the Fox Restaurant Group. Weil spent time in the Fox Restaurant Concepts test kitchen in Phoenix, creating the first TFK menu. The two men gave the concept a trial run when a space opened up in Phoenix, Arizona.

In 2023, John Williams became the newest CEO of True Food Kitchen. The previous CEO was Christine Barone. His previous role was a chief marketing officer at Lazy Dog Restaurants, where he helped expand the company to more than 20 locations. Using his expertise from his previous job, he hopes that can expand True Food Kitchen's brand and evolve even more.

In October 2026, True Food Kitchen filed for Chapter 11 bankruptcy protection and closed 12 of its restaurants.

== Menu and website ==
The menu focuses on the anti-inflammatory diet, which is a way of eating that includes whole foods that are biodiverse and not overly processed.

== Nutritional ideals ==
In February 2024, the company transitioned their kitchens and menus to become 100% seed oil free. Canola oil, sunflower oil, and corn oil are the most popular ones, commonly used in fried and processed foods. Consuming seed oils regularly can lead to chronic inflammation in the body, which can cause arthritis, heart disease, and type 2 diabetes. TFK has committed to cooking with only olive oil and avocado oil, making it one of the first national restaurants brands to go entirely seed-oil free.

One of the company's standards is that their protein is good for the guests and the planet. Their beef is 100% Grass-Fed, their chicken is 100% antibiotic free, their salmon is sustainable raised, and their eggs are pasture raised. In 2023, True Food Kitchen partnered with Vital Farms, a corporation that offers a range of ethically sourced foods nationwide. Vital Farms serves TFK their pasture raised eggs.

== Collaborations ==
In 2018, Oprah Winfrey became a star investor with True Food Kitchen. Bob Green, who is a business associate and health expert who previously worked with Winfrey, introduced her to the restaurant at the Santa Clara location. Winfrey knew that she wanted to become a part of the company's future because of the teams passion for healthy eating. Former CEO of True Food Kitchen, Christine Barone, met with Winfrey and strategized where they could go with the company.

In February 2025, True Food Kitchen partnered with Grammy-Award winning artist SZA to create the SZA CZA salad. This dish is a remix of the Kale Caesar salad which was previously on the menu, but had been taken away when the Fall 2024 menu came out. The Kale Caesar salad was SZA's favorite meal, and when it was discontinued, she DM'ed True Food Kitchen on Instagram asking them to bring it back. The SZA CZA includes her favorite ingredients: organic kale, cherry tomatoes, avocados, scallions, rosemary garlic croutons, shaved parmesan, and house-made caesar dressing.

When a customer purchases this salad, 20% of the proceeds will support SUPRMARKT's mission to make fresh and affordable food accessible to underserved communities in Los Angeles.

== Controversies ==
In 2018, True Food Kitchen was hit with a class action restaurant wage theft lawsuit, where employees claimed that the restaurant chain had failed to pay employees for all hours worked and that the staff were not given proper breaks. This claim was filed by two employees who worked at the Santa Monica, California location. The two employees and True Food Kitchen agreed to settle to case for $900,000, pending court approval.

There are some claims that the dishes at TFK aren't as healthy as they seem. Nutritional information posted on the companies website shows that some of the most famous dishes contain generous amounts of sodium, sugar, and fat. In 2018, a magazine titled, "Eat This, Not That!" ranked the most popular menu items from best to worst, focusing on how healthy they actually are considering sugar, fat, and sodium. They found that some of the dishes contained a days worth of sugar and sodium, leading to the idea that True Food Kitchen is more health-minded rather than healthy.
