= Noop (disambiguation) =

Noop is a programming language from Google.

Noop or NOOP may also refer to:

- NOP (code) or NOOP, a computer processor instruction
- Noop scheduler, an I/O scheduler for the Linux kernel
- Noop, song by Bola from the album Kroungrine

== See also ==
- National United Party (Vanuatu), pronounced as "noop"
- NOP (disambiguation)
- Knoop, a surname (including a list of persons with the name)
