= Knipping =

Knipping is a surname. Notable people with the surname include:

- Angelika Knipping (born 1961), German swimmer
- Arjan Knipping (born 1994), Dutch swimmer
- Georg Knipping (1814–1886), Prissian general
- Juan Pablo Pacheco Knipping or Johnny Pacheco (1935–2021), Dominican musician
- Tim Knipping (born 1992), German footballer

== See also ==
- Kipping
- Knipp (surname)
