= Chris Knapp =

Chris Knapp may refer to:

- Chris Knapp (baseball) (born 1953), retired American baseball player
- Chris Knapp (musician), drummer with The Ataris
- Chris Knapp (politician), American politician
