= Karl Knabl =

German painter

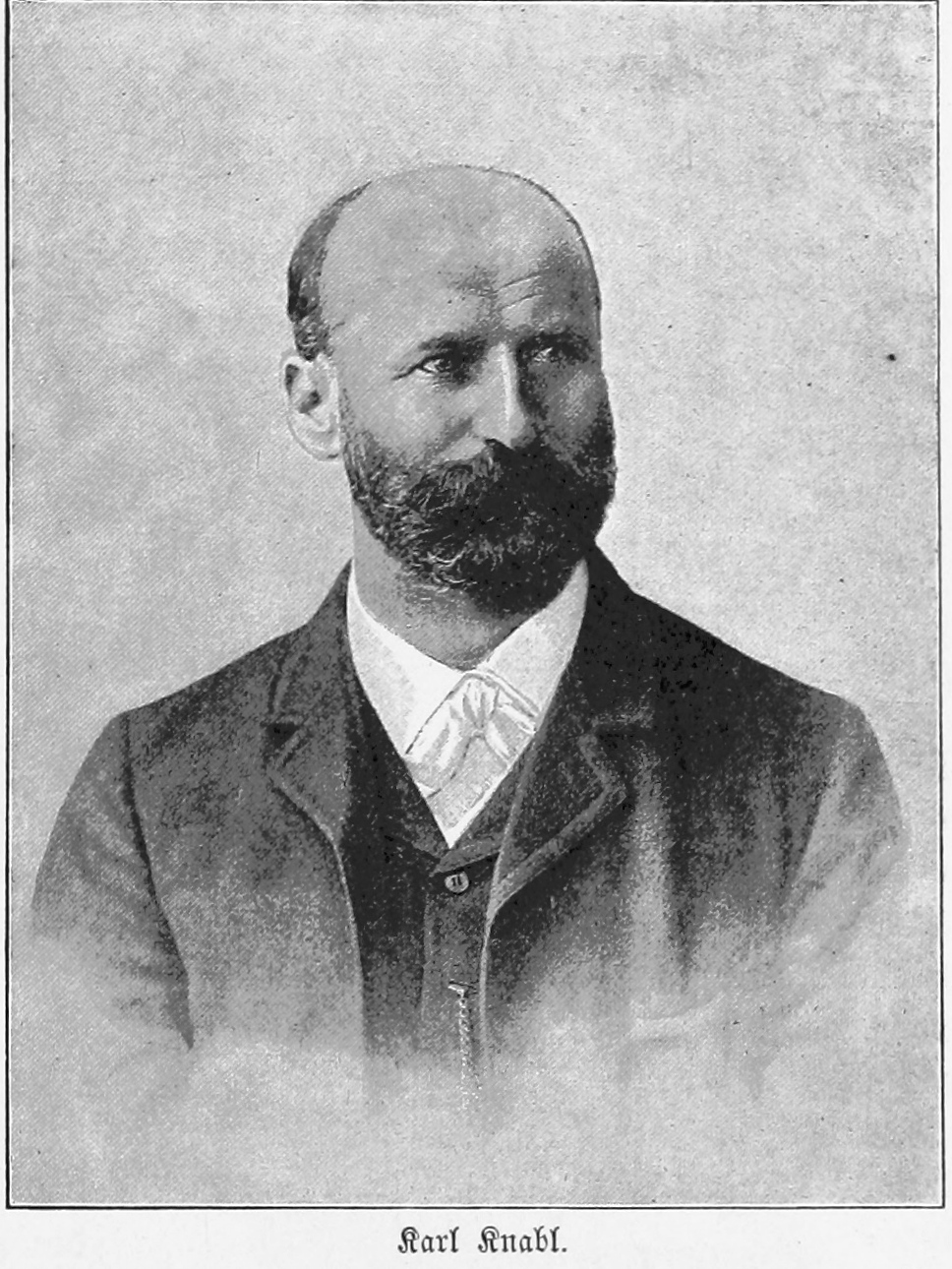
Karl Knabl

Karl Knabl (26 January 1850 – 15 June 1904) was a German landscape and genre painter.

== Biography ==
He was born in Munich, the son of sculptor Joseph Knabl. He first practiced sculpture under his father's instruction, but became a genre painter as a pupil of Karl Theodor von Piloty. Of his genre paintings, his motifs usually involved the lower classes of society.

== Paintings ==
- German: Der bestohlene Geizhals, ("The robbed miser", 1874).
- Die Schusterwerkstatt, ("The cobbler's workshop", 1875).
- Die kleinen Zitherspieler ("The small zither player", 1878).
- An Undiscovered Genius (1879).
- Die Holzfahrt im bayrischen Hochgebirge ("The ride through the woods in the Bavarian mountains", 1883).
- Wilderer, ("Poachers", 1890).
- Auf der Alm, ("On the Alm", 1897).
