= Nellie Augusta Knopf =

American artist (1875–1962)

- Born: October 18, 1875; Chicago, Illinois
- Died: April 30, 1962 (aged 86); Lansing, Michigan
- Known for: Painting

Nellie Augusta Knopf (1875–1962) was an American painter and educator known for her landscapes.

Knopf was born October 18, 1875, in Chicago, Illinois. She attended the Art Institute of Chicago. There she studied under Frederick Warren Freer and John Vanderpoel. Knopf also studied with Charles Herbert Woodbury who maintained a studio in Ogunquit, Maine. Beginning in the early 1920s Knopf frequently traveled to the American west to paint landscapes. She worked in Wyoming, Arizona, Montana, Texas, Colorado, New Mexico, and California.

Knopf taught at Illinois Female College (renamed MacMurray College in 1930) for over four decades, from 1900 through 1943. She exhibited in the Art Institute of Chicago's Annual Exhibition of Works by Chicago and Vicinity Artists in 1914, 1920 1921, 1922, 1925, 1926, 1927, 1930, and 1937.

Knopf died in Lansing, Michigan on April 30, 1962. Upon her death she bequeathed over 500 artworks to MacMurray College. In 2007 the Springfield Art Association held a retrospective of her work. In 1987 a retrospective was held at MacMurray College. In 2015 Knopf's work was included in the exhibition A Timeless Legacy — Women Artists of Glacier National Park at the Hockaday Museum.
