= Guenter Knop =

German photographer (born 1954)

Guenter Knop (born June 1954, in Bremen, Germany) is a photographer known for black and white nudes of women.

Knop began his career working in the studio of German fashion and advertising photographer Charlotte March in the late 1970s. Beginning of the 1980s he moved to New York City and started as first assistant to Henry Wolf, (art director for Esquire, Harper's Bazaar and Show magazines). Ten years lasted his cooperation with Henry Wolf on high fashion, TV, and print advertising for major clients in the eighties and nineties before opening his own studio in Chelsea, Manhattan, NYC. Besides his commercial work he pursued his art. Guenter Knop’s pictures incorporate dramatic lighting and customized sets built from designed props and inspired by Bauhaus, Art Nouveau, and Art Deco designs. A unique feature of Knop’s work is his exclusive use of amateur models from all walks of life that he met in New York.

== Books ==
- Nudes Index, Koenemann Verlag, Germany, 1999 (ISBN 3-8290-0502-4)
- Indexi, Feierabend Verlag, Germany, 2002 (ISBN 3-936761-13-2)
- Naked, Feierabend Verlag, Germany, 2004 (ISBN 3-89985-160-9)
- Guenter Knop on Women, Steffen Verlag, Germany, 2005 (ISBN 3-937669-24-8)
- The Nude Bible, Tectum Publishers, 2007 (ISBN 978-90-76886-50-3)
- The Nude Bible II, Tectum Publishers, 2008 (ISBN 978-90-76886-76-3)
