= Joseph Knabl =

Austrian sculptor

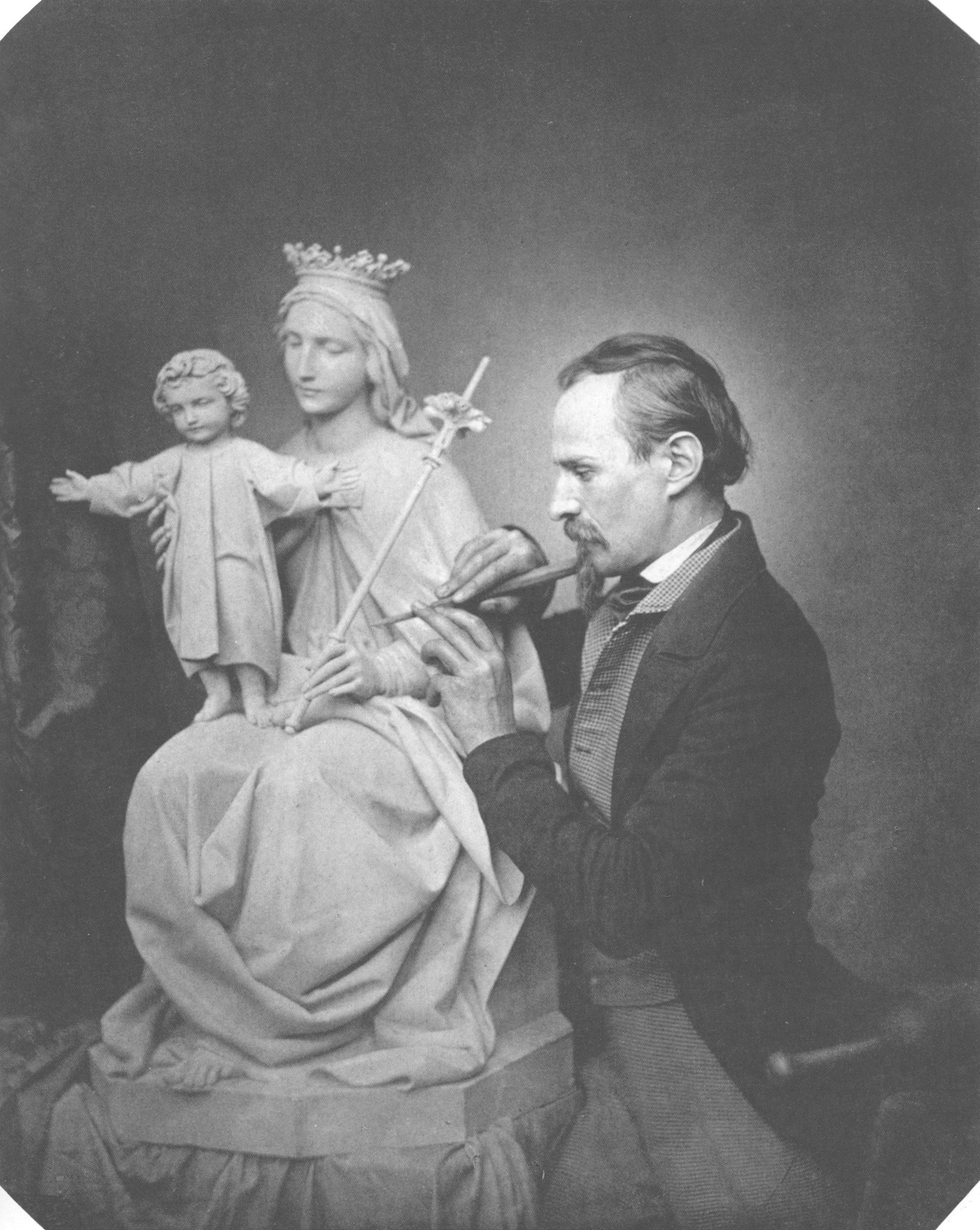
Joseph Knabl.

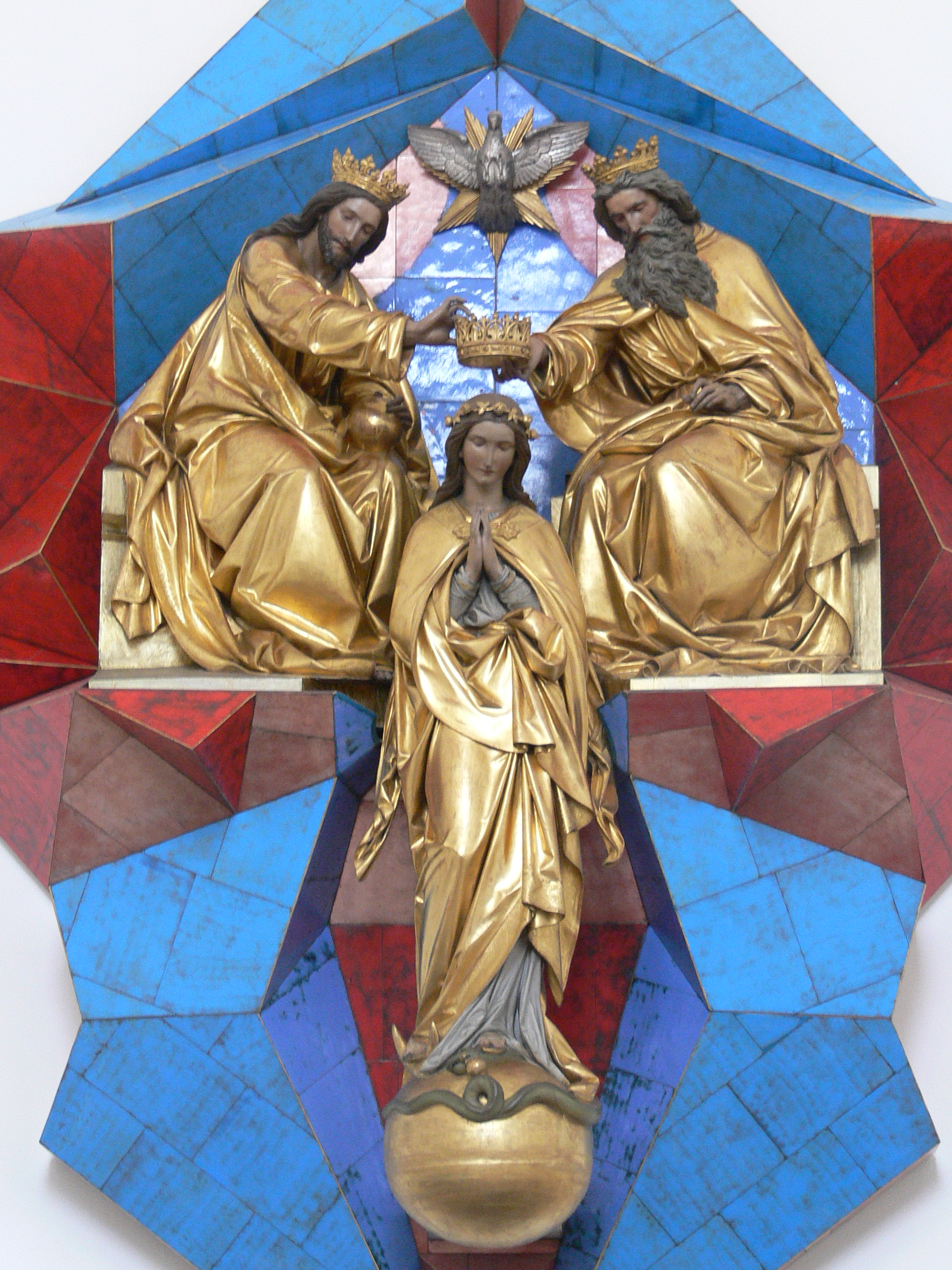
Marienkrönung by Knabl.

Joseph Knabl (17 July 1819 – 3 November 1881) was an Austrian sculptor who specialized in religious statuary.

== Early years and studies ==
Knabl was born at Fliess, Tyrol, to a peasant family. He tended cattle as a boy, but showed an early aptitude for wood-carving. He was apprenticed to Franz Renn, an Imst woodcarver, after which he studied ancient German wood-carving at Munich under J. Otto Entres. Later he worked in the studio of Anselm Sickinger. In 1859 he entered the art institute of Mayer.

== Career ==
After completing his formal studies Knabl toured extensively through Middle Europe and became intimately acquainted with the finest examples of ecclesiastical sculpture. He then began producing similar works. In 1859, he became a professor at the polytechnical school of the Verein für Hebung des Gewerbes. In 1863 he was made professor of ecclesiastical sculpture at the Academy of Fine Arts Munich, in recognition of his principal work in the Munich Frauenkirche, The Coronation of the Virgin. That work depicts the Virgin Mary in larger-than-life size at the center of the high altar, surrounded by 6 worshipping angels. She is being crowned by the Holy Trinity, while forms of saints and angels appear in the framework.

Because of the nature of his sculptures, Knabl is considered a Romantic artist. His sculptures are strongly evocative of German Middle Ages output. His work at the Mayer Institute, where he not only produced numerous drawings and sketches, but also trained capable scholars, furthered the diffusion of a cultivated taste in religious art. Most of his works are in Bavaria (Munich, Haidhausen, Passau, Eichstadt, Velden), but there are also some in Stuttgart, Mergentheim, and in other places. The subjects are: "Christ and the Apostles", "Christ on the Cross", several single statues of the Madonna (one for Lord Acton), the Madonna in a group, St. Anne (much admired at the Munich Exposition of 1858 on account of its artistic draping). A group of St. Afra (Augsburg) was the first of the artist's works to attract attention.

Knabl was married. His son Karl (1850–1904) was a successful landscape and genre painter.
