= Knebelite =

General
- Category: Minerals
- Formula: (Fe,Mn)_{2}SiO_{4}
- Crystal system: Orthorhombic

Identification
- Color: dark green

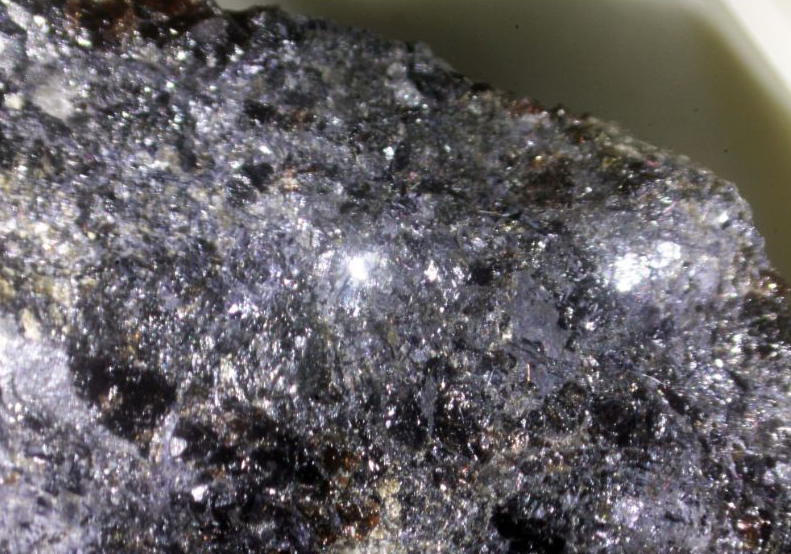
Knebelite specimen

Knebelite is a manganese variety of the fayalite-tephroite series with formula (Fe,Mn)_{2}SiO_{4}. It forms dark green orthorhombic crystals. It is reported from a variety of locations in Sweden as well as South Africa, Russia, British Columbia, New Hampshire, and Rhode Island.
