= Brandon–Hill list =

The Brandon–Hill list is a list of journals and books recommended for a small hospital library.

Compiled by Alfred Brandon and Dorothy Hill, the 2003 version included 434 books and subscriptions to 79 journals, but is no longer updated and has been replaced by Doody's Core Titles.

It has been used to calculate the rate of rise of journal costs.
