= Edward Knippers =

American painter

- Born: 1946 (age 79–80); Oklahoma City
- Education: Asbury College; University of Tennessee
- Known for: Large scale paintings
- Notable work: Biblical narratives featuring nude figures

Edward Knippers (born 1946) is an American artist, his major works are large scale paintings depicting biblical narratives featuring nude figures.

Edward Knippers attended Asbury College in Wilmore, Kentucky where he attained a BA in fine arts. He later studied at the University of Tennessee and attained a Master of Fine Arts degree in painting. He studied in the studios of Zao Wou-Ki in 1970 and Otto Eglau in 1976 at the International Summer Academy of Fine Arts in Salzburg. In 1976, he was awarded the Prize of Salzburg in print-making. In 1980, he was a fellow at S. W. Hayter's Atelier 17 in Paris. He also studied at the Sorbonne and at the Pennsylvania Academy of Fine Arts.

Since 1983, Knippers has focused his work on Biblical narratives in which the characters are shown in the nude.

His images push both at art historical norms and evangelical sensibilities. Yet despite this tension, over the course of Knippers’ career he has continually exhibited in evangelical and religious venues. The artistic quality and theological depth of Knippers’ artwork provides a path for evangelicals to contemplate the significance of Incarnation in an evangelical aesthetic of nudity and pursue an overarching philosophy of art.

— Rondall Reynoso,

In his work, Knippers explores the relationship between Christian faith and the creation of outstanding new visual art. His art is large in scale.

Knippers is an Anglican, he and his wife attend Truro Church (Fairfax, Virginia) where he sings in the choir.
