= Robert C. Fulford =

American physician

Robert C. Fulford, DO
- Born: 1905
- Died: 1997 (aged 91–92)
- Education: Kansas City School of Osteopathy and Surgery
- Occupation: Osteopathy

Robert C. Fulford, D.O. (1905–1997) was a pioneer in the introduction of alternative and energetic medicine in the context of osteopathy. From the nineteen forties, he developed several methods to treat chronic illnesses. Among the main methods he employed, was cranial manipulation - sometimes referred to as cranial osteopathy. He was a student of William Garner Sutherland.

Fulford has been acknowledged prominently by leading alternative medicine proponent Andrew Weil as a major influence on his professional and personal life. Zachary Comeaux discusses Dr. Fulford's approach, philosophy and techniques in his 2002 book Robert Fulford, D.O. and the philosopher physician. Gene Stone, whom Dr. Fulford asked to collaborate with him on his book Touch of Life, included Dr. Fulford's five-step exercise plan as the basis for the chapter on Stretching, in his book The Secrets of People Who Never Get Sick

Also an electric percussive device is referred to as the Fulford hammer or Fulford percussor, following his introduction of its use in Osteopathic treatment.
