= Carsten Knop =

German journalist

Carsten Knop (born 10 February 1969) is a German journalist and one of four editors-at large of the German conservative newspaper Frankfurter Allgemeine Zeitung (FAZ).

Knop was born in the Westgerman city of Dortmund and studied business administration at the University of Münster. He works as a journalist since 1993 and became an editor-at large for economics of the FAZ in 2020.
