= Juncus longii =

Scientific classification
- Kingdom: Plantae
- Clade: Tracheophytes
- Clade: Angiosperms
- Clade: Monocots
- Clade: Commelinids
- Order: Poales
- Family: Juncaceae
- Genus: Juncus
- Species: J. longii

Binomial name
- Juncus longii Fernald

Species of grass

Juncus longii is a species within section Graminifolii—distinguished by its flat, septae-less leaves and rounded capsules arranged in glomerules—Juncus longii stands out for its particularly dense and compact inflorescence. It also features elongate rhizomes with well-spaced rhizome scales, further setting it apart from other species in the section.

== Distribution ==
Juncus longii is a species endemic to the United States, with a much smaller and more restricted range than its close relatives Juncus biflorus and Juncus marginatus. It is found exclusively in freshwater seepages of the southeastern U.S., particularly across Maryland, the District of Columbia, and the Coastal Plain of Virginia, the Carolinas, Georgia, Florida, Alabama, and Mississippi, as well as the Cumberland Plateau and Blue Ridge regions of Tennessee and the Carolinas.

== Description ==
Juncus longii is a perennial, rhizomatous, glabrous herb with erect, solitary culms ranging from 38.5 to 96.8 cm tall and 2.5–8.2 mm wide at the base. Its slender, elongate rhizomes reach up to 20 cm in length and 0.8–1.9 mm in width, bearing well-spaced, often purple-red root cataphylls. Leaves are both basal and cauline, unifacial, and alternate, with sheaths 3.1–9.1 cm long ending in two small auricles. Leaf blades are linear, 2.8–9.1 cm long and 1.5–4.4 mm wide, typically canaliculate or flat. The inflorescence is dense, hemispheric, and compound, made up of 9–37 glomerules with 1–12 flowers each. Flowers are bisexual and lack bracteoles. Tepals are subequal, persistent, and green to castaneous with hyaline margins. The plant has three stamens with small anthers that shrivel quickly. Capsules are broadly ellipsoid, dark brown, glossy, and roughly the same length as the tepals. Seeds are numerous, ellipsoid to oblong, yellow to orange, and have 8–12 longitudinal lines and a narrow hyaline wing.
