= Knittel, Iowa =

- unincorporated community
- Location within Iowa
- Coordinates: 42°42′55″N 92°15′31″W
- Country: United States
- State: Iowa
- County: Bremer
- Elevation: 1,010 ft (310 m)
- Time zone: UTC-6 (Central (CST))
  - Summer (DST): UTC-5 (CDT)

Knittel is an unincorporated community in Maxfield Township in Bremer County, Iowa, United States.

== Geography ==
Knittel lies at the junction of Iowa Highway 3 and County Road V43. It is two miles northwest of Readlyn.

== History ==
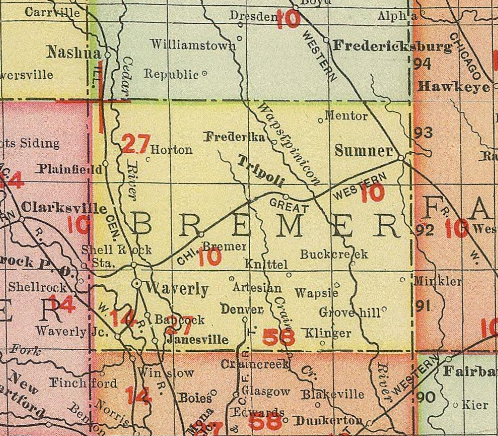
Knittel in Bremer County, Iowa, in 1903

Knittel was founded in Maxfield Township. According to a history of Bremer County, "the town of Knittel was named in honor of" John Knittel, born in Swabia in 1838. The Knittel post office opened on January 30, 1885.

Knittel's population was 25 in 1887, was 22 in 1902, and was 26 in 1917. Knittel's population had increased to 45 in 1925, but the town's fortunes began to decline after that.

The Knittel post office closed on January 14, 1905.

The Knittel school operated in the community circa 1900.

The gravel road between Knittel and Tripoli was paved with blacktop in 1957, as part of Bremer County's road improvement project.
