= Otto A. Knopp =

Otto Albrecht Knopp (24 August 1877 – 19 December 1946) was a German-American innovator of the standard testing transformer and the Compensation Winding. He was also the patentee of what has become known as the Knopp set in honor of him, and the author of a number of technical reports, including New Current Balance for Calibration Work, published in 1920.
