= Steven Knope =

American physician

- Born: Milford, Michigan, U.S.
- Education: Mannes School of Music (BA); Columbia University (BS); Cornell University (MD)
- Scientific career
- Fields: Internal medicine; Sports medicine; Concierge medicine
- Workplaces: University of California, Los Angeles; Colorado Rockies; The Knope Clinic

Steven Knope is an American internist and the author of two medical-related books. He practices medicine at The Knope Clinic, which he founded, in Tucson, Arizona.

== Early life and education ==
Born and raised in Milford, Michigan, Knope described himself as "a terrible student" in math and science. Knope earned a Bachelor of Music degree from the Mannes School of Music, a conservatory at The New School in New York City.

Knope found a math tutor through a contact at Columbia University, and eventually completed premedical studies at Columbia University. He then graduated with honors in internal medicine from Weill Cornell Medicine of Cornell University in 1988. He completed his residency training at University of California, Los Angeles, where he was awarded the first Sherman Mellinkoff Teacher of the Year Award.

== Career ==
Concierge Medicine was the first book written about concierge medicine, a system that emphasizes the relationship between a patient and a primary care physician in which the patient pays an annual fee or retainer. Knope pioneered concierge medicine (as a replacement for HMOs) after opening one of the first concierge practices in the United States in 2000. His comments about the industry have been covered by The New York Times, The Wall Street Journal, Arizona Daily Star, and Money. He has appeared as a keynote speaker at conferences hosted by the Association of American Physicians and Surgeons and was on a 2009 All Things Considered segment about doctored nurses. In a TV interview, Knope debated Andrew Weil on the merits of alternative medicine.

Knope worked as the physician for the Colorado Rockies baseball team during the team's spring training in Tucson. He also was a personal physician for former University of Arizona basketball coach Lute Olson. He has been a member of the editorial board of the American College of Sports Medicine’s Health & Fitness Journal. He is a speaker on the subjects of obesity, fitness and exercise. He worked as chief of medicine, chairman of the department of medicine, and director of the ICU in the Carondelet Health Network, catholic health care provider based in Arizona.

As a French horn player, Knope has appeared on WNYC and as a soloist at Lincoln Center.

=== Books ===
His first book, The Body/Mind Connection, independently published in 2000, examines the power of physical strength of the body and psychological well-being. His second book, Concierge Medicine: A New System to Get the Best Healthcare, was released by Greenwood Publishing Group in 2008.
