= Solange Knopf =

Belgian artist (born 1957)

Solange Knopf (born 1957, Brussels, Belgium) is an artist who often works with pages of books and Baudelaire's poetry. Knopf's work has been featured at a collection of institutions, including the Menil Collection in Houston, the Galerie Dettinger-Mayer in Lyon and the Cavin-Morris Gallery in New York City.

Knopf began studying at the Art School of Ixelles in 1998, only to quit due to their rigidity. Instead she continued on her own path and continued to make art without instruction, allowing her drawings to flow out of her. Randall Morris describes her work, "She has used her own soul to travel to these places and then shapes them into storytelling for our benefit. She does not hide the frightening and painful parts but she blends them into the story naturally. They are both new and familiar and when they are new she weaves (through drawing) an amuletic web around them, and when they are familiar she owns them in such a way that we see them in ways we have never seen them before."

== Exhibitions ==
Solo Exhibitions

- Spirit Codex: Drawings by Solange Knopf, May 1 - June 5, 2014, Cavin-Morris Gallery, New York, NY

Group Exhibitions

- As Essential as Dreams: Self-Taught Art from the Collection of Stephanie and John Smither, Jun 10 – Oct 16, 2016, The Menil Collection, Houston, TX
