= Edward Knapp (cricketer) =

English cricketer

Edward Michael Molineux Knapp (28 April 1848 – 24 November 1903) was an English cricketer active from 1871 to 1880 who played for Gloucestershire. He was born in Bath, Somerset and died in Croydon. He appeared in 12 first-class matches as a righthanded batsman who bowled right arm fast with a roundarm action. He scored 216 runs with a highest score of 90* and held four catches. He took two wickets with a best analysis of two for 27.
