= Joannis Knuttel =

Dutch literary and political activist (1878–1965)

Joannis Adrianus Nelinus Knuttel (1878–1965) was a Dutch literary and political activist. He came from a latitudinarian liberal family, reading socialist literature at a young age. He went to study at the university in Leiden and, becoming familiar with Marxist writings, especially those of Kautsky. In 1903 he became a member of the SDAP. In 1906 he became one of the authors of the Woordenboek der Nederlandsche Taal. In 1907 he became an editor of De Sociaal-Demokraat. Later that year he co-founded De Tribune, a Marxist paper. During WWII he was not involved in the resistance and during the Cold War he became increasingly estranged from the Communist Party, of which he was now a member.

He was a member of the municipal council of Leiden on multiple occasions throughout his career.
