= NOP =

NOP or N.O.P. may refer to:

== Science and technology ==
- NOP (code), an assembly language instruction etc. that effectively does nothing at all
- 3-Nitrooxypropanol, an enzyme inhibitor
- Nociceptin receptor, a neurotransmitter receptor in the opioid receptor family

== Organisations ==
- Croatian Partisans (Narodnooslobodilački pokret), a former resistance movement in Yugoslavia
- National Opinion Polls, a pollster acquired by GfK
- National Revival of Poland (Narodowe Odrodzenie Polski), a nationalistic Polish political party
- Northern Ontario Party, a political party in Ontario, Canada

=== Sports ===
- New Orleans Pelicans, a National Basketball Association team based in New Orleans, Louisiana, US
- Nike Oregon Project, an athletics team

== Other uses ==
- New Orleans Protocol, a 2004 agreement among white supremacist and neo-Nazi groups
- National Organic Program, an American organic food certification program
- Network of practice, in social science
- North Point station (station code NOP), a train station on the Hong Kong MTR Island Line
- Sinop Airport (IATA code NOP), an airport in Sinop, in the Black Sea Region of Turkey

== See also ==
- Noop (disambiguation)
