= Florence Knapp =

Florence Knapp is the name of:

- Florence Knapp (supercentenarian), US supercentenarian
- Florence E. S. Knapp (c. 1875–1949), US politician and New York Secretary of State
- Florence Knapp (author), British author
