= Lisa Kneip =

Luxembourgish footballer (born 2002)

Personal information
- Date of birth: 1 April 2002 (age 24)
- Position: Midfielder

Team information
- Current team: SC Ell
- Number: 20

Senior career*
Years	Team	Apps	(Gls)
2017–	SC Ell	119	(46)

International career^{‡}
2022–	Luxembourg	2	(0)
- * Club domestic league appearances and goals as of 8 June 2026 ‡ National team caps and goals as of 21 February 2022

Lisa Kneip (born 1 April 2002) is a Luxembourgish footballer who plays as a midfielder for Dames Ligue 1 club SC Ell and the Luxembourg women's national team.

== International career ==
Kneip made her senior debut for Luxembourg on 16 February 2022 during a 5–0 friendly win against Tahiti.
