= Lewis Mehl-Madrona =

Author of the Coyote trilogy

Lewis E. Mehl-Madrona (born January 26, 1954, Berea, Kentucky) is the author of the Coyote trilogy. His work discusses healing practices from Lakota, Cherokee and Cree traditions, and how they intersect with conventional medicine (via a social constructionist model). Mehl-Madrona has been writing about the use of imagery and narrative in healing since the 1980s. Mehl-Madrona is certified in psychiatry, geriatrics and family medicine.

His research collaborations include work on various psychological conditions, issues of psychology during birthing, nutritional approaches to autism and diabetes, and the use of healing circles to improve overall health outcomes.

He is now an associate professor of Family Medicine at University of New England College of Osteopathic Medicine in Maine and is Education Director for the Coyote Institute for Studies of Change and Transformation. He was on the core faculty of the former PsyD program at Union Institute & University. He writes a regular column for Futurehealth.org, in which he contributes his insights to modern psychiatry, the frustrations of health care and alternative ways of seeing mental illness, including an article about the January, 2011 tragedy in Tucson, Arizona.

== Publications ==
- Mehl-Madrona, L.E. (1997) Coyote Medicine. New York: Simon and Schuster. Paperback; Firestone, 1998
- Mehl-Madrona, L., & Dossey, L,. (2003) Coyote healing: Miracles in native medicine Rochester, Vermont: Bear and Company.
- Mehl-Madrona, L. (2005) Coyote wisdom: The power of story in healing Rochester, Vermont: Bear and Company
- Mehl-Madrona, L. (2007) Narrative medicine Rochester, Vermont: Bear and Company
- Mehl-Madrona, L. (2010) The Healing Power of Story: The Promise of Narrative Psychiatry. Rochester, Vermont: Bear and Company
- Mehl, L.E. (1976). Statistical Outcomes of Home Delivery; comparison to similarly selected hospital deliveries. . In Stewart and Stewart, eds., Safe Alternatives in Childbirth. Marble Hill, Missouri: Napsac Publications.
- Mehl and Peterson (1979). Comparative studies of Psychological Outcomes of Various Childbirth Alternatives. In Stewart and Stewart, ed. 21st Century Obstetrics Now. Marble Hill, Mo.: NAPSAC Publications.
- Mehl, L.E. (1988). Magic, Medicine, and Shamanism, in Heize, R., Proceedings of the Vth International Conference of Shamanism. Berkeley: University of California (Asian Studies).
- Mehl, L. (1989). Modern Day Shamanism: Bridging Native American Medicine with Biomedicine. In Doore, G. (ed.). Shaman's Path. Boulder: Shambala.
- Mehl, L.E. (1994). Chalazion Therapy. In Procedures in Family Practice. Philadelphia: W.B. Saunders.
- Mehl-Madrona L. (2003). Native American herbal pharmacology, healing, and elder care. In Selin H, Shapiro D. Medicine Across Cultures. London: Kluwer.
- Mehl-Madrona L. (2008) Was Coyote the Original Psychotherapist? In Panter B, ed. Creativity and Madness, Volume 2, Thousand Oaks, CA: AIMED Press.
- Mehl-Madrona L. (2015) Remapping Your Mind; The Neuroscience of Self-transformation through Story Rochester, Vermont: Bear and Company. Trade Paperback
