= Gottfried Knebel =

German botanist

- Born: 1908
- Scientific career
- Fields: Botany
- Author abbrev. (botany): Knebel

Gottfried Knebel (born 1908, date of death unknown) was a German botanist.
