= Knoppers =

Knoppers is a surname. Notable people with the surname include:

- Annelies Knoppers, American volleyball player and coach
- Carel Knoppers (1930–2021), Dutch politician
- Bartha Knoppers, Canadian lawyer and scientist
- Gary N. Knoppers (1956–2018), American academic

== See also ==
- Knoppers (sweet brand) by German company August Storck
- Knab, Knabb, Knabe, Knabl, Knap, Knape, Knapp, Knappe, Knapper
- Knoop, Knop, Knope, Knopp, Knops, Knopf, Knopff, Knöppel, Knopper, Knoppers, Knöpfle, Knopfler
- Kneppers, Knippers
