= Knope =

Knope is a surname. Notable people with the surname include:

- Steven Knope, American internist
- Leslie Knope, a fictional character in the television series Parks and Recreation

== See also ==
- Knab, Knabb, Knabe, Knabl, Knap, Knape, Knapp, Knappe, Knapper
- Knoop, Knop, Knope, Knopp, Knops, Knopf, Knopff, Knöppel, Knopper, Knoppers, Knöpfle, Knopfler
