= Emma Knobl =

Argentine field hockey player (born 2005)

Personal information
- Born: 27 October 2005 (age 20) Buenos Aires, Argentina

Sport
- Sport: Field hockey
- Position: Defender
- Club: Lomas
National team
Years	Team	Caps	Goals
2024	Argentina U–21	13	(3)
2024–	Argentina	16	(0)
Medal record
Women's field hockey
Representing Argentina
World Cup
Gold medal – first place	2026 Wavre/Amstelveen
Pan American Cup
Gold medal – first place	2025 Montevideo
South American Games
Gold medal – first place	2026 Santa Fe
FIH Junior World Cup
Silver medal – second place	2025 Santiago	Team
Pan American Junior Championship
Gold medal – first place	2024 Surrey	Team

Emma Knobl (born 27 October 2005) is a field hockey player from Argentina.

== Career ==
=== Under–21 ===
Knobl made her international debut for Argentina at under–21 level in 2024. She was a member of the gold medal-winning squad at the Pan American Junior Championship, held in Surrey.

=== Las Leonas ===
Knobl received her maiden call-up to the senior national squad in 2024. She made her senior international debut for Las Leonas in December, during the first of two Argentina legs of the 2024–25 Women's FIH Pro League, held in Santiago del Estero.

She has been named in an extended national squad for 2025.
