= Joshua Knobe =

American experimental philosopher (born 1974)

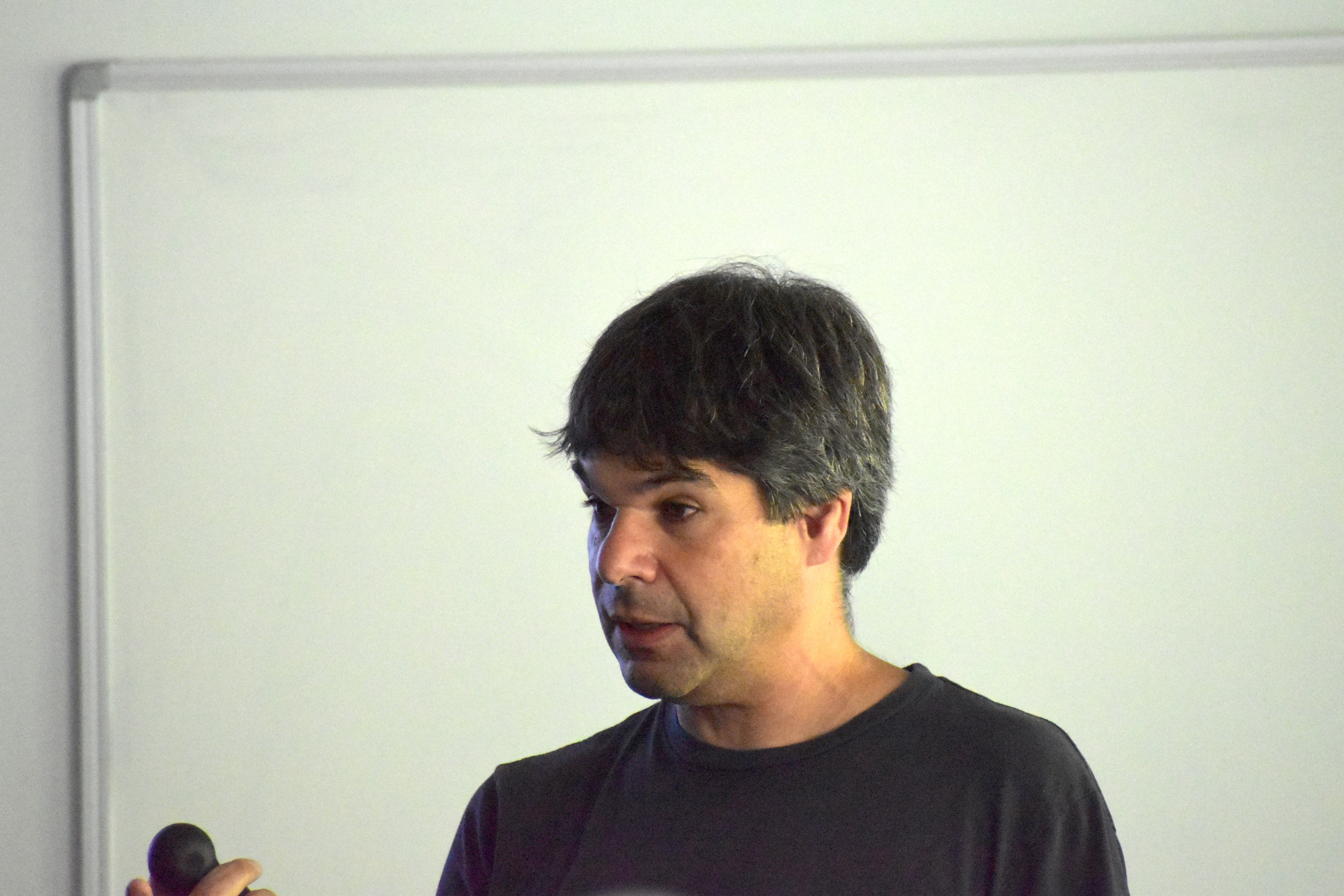
- Knobe at the 5th European Experimental Philosophy Conference in 2025
- Born: Joshua Michael Knobe; 1974 (age 51–52)

Education
- Education: Stanford University; Princeton University
- Doctoral advisor: Gilbert Harman

Philosophical work
- Era: Contemporary philosophy
- Region: Western philosophy
- School: Experimental philosophy
- Main interests: Philosophy of action, moral philosophy, moral psychology
- Notable ideas: Knobe effect

Joshua Michael Knobe (/noʊb/; born 1974) is an American experimental philosopher, whose work ranges across issues in philosophy of mind and action and ethics. He is Professor of Cognitive Science and Philosophy at Yale University. He is known for his work on the "Knobe effect" and use of experimental methods to understand personal reactions to moral dilemmas.

== Education and career ==
Knobe received his B.A. at Stanford University in 1996 and his Ph.D. from Princeton in 2006, where his dissertation was directed by Gilbert Harman.

He was Assistant Professor of Philosophy at the University of North Carolina at Chapel Hill from 2006 until moving to Yale in 2009.

== Philosophical work ==
His work has spanned various topics, including intentionality, free will, the self and dual-character concept.

=== Knobe effect ===
Knobe is arguably most widely known for what has come to be called the Knobe effect or the "side-effect effect". According to Jones (2009):

Rather than consulting his own philosophical intuitions, Knobe set out to find out how ordinary people think about intentional action. In a study published in 2003, Knobe presented passers-by in a Manhattan park with the following scenario. The CEO of a company is sitting in his office when his Vice President of R&D comes in and says, ‘We are thinking of starting a new programme. It will help us increase profits, but it will also harm the environment.’ The CEO responds that he doesn’t care about harming the environment and just wants to make as much profit as possible. The programme is carried out, profits are made and the environment is harmed.

Did the CEO intentionally harm the environment? The vast majority of people Knobe quizzed – 82 per cent – said he did. But what if the scenario is changed such that the word ‘harm’ is replaced with ‘help’? In this case the CEO doesn’t care about helping the environment, and still just wants to make a profit – and his actions result in both outcomes. Now faced with the question ‘Did the CEO intentionally help the environment?’, just 23 per cent of Knobe’s participants said ‘yes’ (Knobe, 2003a).

This asymmetry in responses between the ‘harm’ and ‘help’ scenarios, now known as the Knobe effect, provides a direct challenge to the idea of a one-way flow of judgments from the factual or non-moral domain to the moral sphere. ‘These data show that the process is actually much more complex,’ argues Knobe. Instead, the moral character of an action’s consequences also seems to influence how non-moral aspects of the action – in this case, whether someone did something intentionally or not – are judged.

== Selected publications ==
- Hitchcock, C. & Knobe, J. (2009). "Cause and Norm". Journal of Philosophy, 106, 587-612.
- Knobe, J. (2009). "Answers to Five Questions". In Aguilar, J & Buckareff, A (eds.) Philosophy of Action: 5 Questions. London: Automatic Press. (PDF)
- Knobe, J., & Kelly, S. D. (2009). "Can one act for a reason without acting intentionally?" In C. Sandis (ed.), New Essays on the Explanation of Action (pp. 169–183). Basingstoke: Palgrave Macmillan.
- Knobe, J. & Nichols, S. (2008). Experimental Philosophy. New York: Oxford University Press.
- Nichols, S. & Knobe, J. (2007). "Moral Responsibility and Determinism: The Cognitive Science of Folk Intuitions". Nous, 41, 663-685.
- Knobe, J. (2006). "The Concept of Intentional Action: A Case Study in the Uses of Folk Psychology". Philosophical Studies. 130: 203-231.
- Knobe, J. (2003a). "Intentional Action and Side Effects in Ordinary Language". Analysis, 63, 190-193.
- Knobe, J. (2003b). "Intentional Action in Folk Psychology: An Experimental Investigation". Philosophical Psychology, 16, 309-324.

== See also ==
- American philosophy
- List of American philosophers
