= Knopper =

Knopper is a surname. Notable people with the surname include:

- Klaus Knopper (born 1968), German electrical engineer and free software developer
- Richard Knopper (born 1977), Dutch football player

== See also ==
- Knopper gall, a gall that develops on pedunculate oak trees
- Knab, Knabb, Knabe, Knabl, Knap, Knape, Knapp, Knappe, Knapper
- Knoop, Knop, Knopp, Knops, Knopf, Knopff, Knöppel, Knopper, Knoppers, Knöpfle, Knopfler
- Knepper
