= Knapper =

Village in Nord-Odal Municipality, Norway

- Village
- Interactive map of Knapper
- Location within Innlandet Location within Norway
- Coordinates: 60.46877°N 11.62212°E
- Country: Norway
- Region: Eastern Norway
- County: Innlandet
- District: Odalen
- Municipality: Nord-Odal Municipality

Area
  - Total: 0.37 km^{2} (0.14 sq mi)
- Elevation: 158 m (518 ft)

Population (2009)
  - Total: 212
  - Density: 570/km^{2} (1,500/sq mi)
- Time zone: UTC+01:00 (CET)
  - Summer (DST): UTC+02:00 (CEST)
- Post Code: 2130 Knapper

Knapper is a village in Nord-Odal Municipality in Innlandet county, Norway. The village is located about 5 kilometres (3.1 mi) north of the village of Mo.

The 0.37-square-kilometre (91-acre) village had a population (2009) of 212 and a population density of 573 inhabitants per square kilometre (1,480/sq mi). Since 2009, the population and area data for this village area has not been separately tracked by Statistics Norway.
