= Knopfler =

Knopfler or Knöpfler is a German occupational surname meaning "button maker".

- David Knopfler (born 1952), British musician
- Mark Knopfler (born 1949), British musician

== See also ==
- Knab, Knabb, Knabe, Knabl, Knap, Knape, Knapp, Knappe
- Knoop, Knop, Knopp, Knops, Knopf, Knopff, Knöppel, Knöpfle
- Knepper
