= Paul Knoepfler =

American biologist, writer, and blogger (born 1967)

Paul S. Knoepfler
- Born: April 10, 1967 (age 58)
- Awards: Howard Temin Award
- Scientific career
- Fields: Stem cells, Cancer Biology, Epigenomics
- Website: www.chromatin.com

Paul S. Knoepfler (born April 10, 1967) is an American biologist, writer, and blogger. He is a professor in the Department of Cell Biology and Human Anatomy, the Genome Center, and the Comprehensive Cancer Center at the University of California, Davis School of Medicine. In 2013, Knoepfler was named one of the 50 most influential people in the stem cell field.

== Education ==
Knoepfler received a BA in English Literature from Reed College in 1989 and a PhD in Molecular Pathology from the University of California, San Diego School of Medicine in 1998 as a Lucille P. Markey Fellow.

== Research ==
Knoepfler's research is focused on enhancing the safety of stem cell treatments, including that of induced pluripotent stem cells, and developing novel therapies to target cancers, particularly brain tumors. His lab studies the Myc oncogene and other factors that regulate stem and cancer cell chromatin including histone variant H3.3.

Knoepfler did his postdoctoral studies at the Fred Hutchinson Cancer Research Center in the laboratory of Bob Eisenman, studying Myc regulation of chromatin in stem cells and cancers of the nervous system. During his postdoctoral studies, Knoepfler received a fellowship from the Jane Coffin Childs Memorial Fund for Medical Research, and the Howard Temin Award from the National Cancer Institute (NCI).

Knoepfler joined UC Davis in 2006 as an assistant professor, shortly after the formation of the California stem cell agency, the California Institute for Regenerative Medicine (CIRM). His decision to move was influenced at least in part by the promise of CIRM to vitalize stem cell research in California. He received a $2 million New Faculty Award from CIRM in 2008. More recently, he received the GPI national stem cell advocacy award in 2013.

Knoepfler has also received support from the March of Dimes via the Basil O'Connor Starter Scholar Research Award and from the National Brain Tumor Society. Knoepfler was more recently awarded grants from the St. Baldrick's Foundation to support work studying how Myc causes childhood brain cancers and potential ways to develop new treatments.

== Cancer, blogging, and advocacy ==
Knoepfler was diagnosed with prostate cancer in late 2009 at age 42, an experience he credits at least in part as the inspiration to start blogging as an academic stem cell researcher. As of 2012, Knoepfler was the only stem cell scientist in the United States who regularly blogged about stem cells. Knoepfler remains in long-term remission from prostate cancer after surgery in 2009. In addition to blogging about stem cells, he blogged about his experience with prostate cancer, a disease that is often not discussed openly by men.

Knoepfler received tenure in 2011 while actively blogging, an event he claims demonstrates a growing acceptance of social media in academia. He is a proponent of scientific social media and has been listed as the top person to follow on Twitter to stay current on events in the stem cell field. His blog at http://www.ipscell.com has broken a number of stem cell news stories, including the fraud of Hisashi Moriguchi of Japan, who claimed to have transplanted iPS cells into humans as early as 2012; the unawarded third position for the 2012 Nobel Prize in Physiology or Medicine; and the explosion of stem cell cosmetics. In addition to his blogging, in 2013 Knoepfler released a book titled Stem Cells: An Insider's Guide, which is aimed at a general audience of both scientists and non-scientists.

As part of education and advocacy efforts, Knoepfler has supplied his own funds to support advancing the stem cell cause. In 2012, he awarded multiple $50 iTunes gift cards as prizes for a stem cell essay contest and started a Stem Cell Person of the Year Award that includes a $1,000 cash prize given from Knoepfler's own money. The first winner of this award was stem cell and spinal cord injury patient advocate, Roman Reed.

In 2015, Knoepfler published a new book, titled GMO Sapiens: The Life-Changing Science of Designer Babies, which discusses the science of human genetic modification. His second book covers the new CRISPR gene editing technology and its possible use in humans, cloning, eugenics, and transhumanism. Knoepfler advocates in the book for a temporary moratorium on clinical use of CRISPR in humans, whether for health condition or even human enhancement to create designer babies. In a TEDx Vienna talk titled "What if my neighbor's kid was genetically modified?" he addresses his concerns on the use of CRISPR in humans.

In December 2015, Knoepfler was interviewed on the PBS Nightly News hour along with Jennifer Doudna, by Gwen Ifil. In 2016, he was a panelist on Episode 12 of the TV show Bill Nye Saves the World to discuss CRISPR and designer babies. In 2017, he was the subject of a feature article in Science Magazine for his advocacy and educational outreach work.

In 2019 Knoepfler co-authored his new book with his daughter, Julie Knoepfler, How to Build a Dragon or Die Trying: A Satirical Look at Cutting-Edge Science, which discusses using CRISPR gene editing, stem cells, and bioengineering to make real dragons.

== Bibliography ==
- Stem Cells: An Insider's Guide (2013)
- GMO Sapiens: The Life-Changing Science of Designer Babies (2015)
- How to Build a Dragon or Die Trying: A Satirical Look at Cutting-Edge Science (2019)
