= Knapp (surname) =

Knapp is a German surname. Notable people with the surname include:

- Adeline Knapp (1860–1909) American journalist, author, and social activist
- Alexis Knapp (born 1989), American actress
- Andrew Knapp (born 1991), American baseball player
- Anthonie Knapp, American football player
- Anthony W. Knapp (born 1941), American mathematician
- Bliss Knapp (1877–1958), American Christian Scientist
- Brooke Knapp (born 1940), American aviator and realtor
- Charles Knapp (1868–1936), American classical scholar
- Charles Boynton Knapp (born 1946), American academic
- Chauncey L. Knapp (1809–1898), American politician
- Chris Knapp (disambiguation), multiple people
- Edward Knapp (disambiguation), multiple people
- Elizabeth Knapp (17th century), American settler and alleged possession victim
- Florence Knapp (disambiguation), multiple people
- Gaines A. Knapp (1848–1918), American politician
- Georg Christian Knapp (1753–1825), German theologian
- Georg Friedrich Knapp (1842–1926), German economist
- George Knapp (disambiguation), multiple people
- Gillian R. Knapp (born 1944), Scottish astronomer
- Greg Knapp (1963–2021), American football coach
- H. Wallace Knapp (1869–1929), American politician
- Harry Shepard Knapp (1856–1923), American navy admiral
- Hermann Jakob Knapp (1832–1911), German-American ophthalmologist
- Isaac Knapp (1804–1843), journalist and publisher
- Jake Knapp (disambiguation), multiple people
- Jennifer Knapp (born 1974), American-Australian musician
- Joe Knapp, American musician
- John Leonard Knapp (1767–1845), English botanist
- Joseph P. Knapp (1864–1951), American publisher and conservationist
- Justin Knapp (born 1982), Wikipedia editor
- Karin Knapp (born 1987), Italian tennis player
- Lisa Knapp (born 1974), English folk singer, songwriter, fiddle player and multi-instrumentalist
- Louisa Knapp (1851–1910), American columnist and first editor of the Ladies Home Journal
- Lubor Knapp (born 1976), Czech footballer
- Lyman Enos Knapp (1837–1904), American politician
- Mark L. Knapp (born 1938), American academic and author
- Martin Knapp (born 1952), British economist and policy analyst
- Martin Wells Knapp (1853–1901), American minister and founder
- Phoebe Knapp (1839–1908), American composer and musician
- Rick Knapp (born 1961), American baseball coach
- Sandra Knapp (born 1956), British-American botanist
- Seaman A. Knapp (1833–1911), American academic
- Sebastian Knapp, British actor
- Steve Knapp (born 1964), American race car driver
- Wesley M. Knapp, American botanist
- Whitman Knapp (1909–2004), American judge

== See also ==
- Knab, Knabb, Knabe, Knabl, Knap, Knape, Knapp, Knappe
- Knoop, Knop, Knopp, Knops, Knopf
