= Knopf (surname) =

Knopf (also spelt Knopff) is a German surname meaning "button", and may refer to:

- Adolph Knopf (1882–1966), American geologist
- Alfred A. Knopf Jr. (1918–2009), American publisher
- Alfred A. Knopf Sr. (1892–1984), American publisher, husband of Blanche
- Béatrice Knopf-Basson (born 1958), French canoeist
- Blanche Knopf (1894-1966), American publisher, wife of Alfred A. Sr
- Brent Knopf, founder of the American indie rock band Ramona Falls
- Brigitte Knopf (born 1973), German climatologist
- Christopher Knopf (1927–2019), American screenwriter and union executive
- Edwin H. Knopf (1899–1981), American film producer, director and screenwriter
- Eleanora Knopf (1883–1974), American geologist
- Heinrich Knopf (1839–1875), German luthier
- Jim Knopf, computer specialist
- Maike-Katrin Knopf (born 1959), German footballer
- Nellie Augusta Knopf (1875–1962), American artist
- Philip Knopf (1847–1920), member of the United States House of Representatives from Illinois
- Rainer Knopff, Canadian political scientist
- Sigard Adolphus Knopf (1857–1940), German-American physician
- Solange Knopf (born 1957), Belgian artist

== See also ==
- Fernand Khnopff, Belgian artist
- Knab, Knabb, Knabe, Knabl, Knap, Knape, Knapp, Knappe
- Knoop, Knop, Knopp, Knops, Knopf, Knopff, Knöppel, Knöpfle
