= Knabl =

Knabl is a German surname. Notable people with the surname include:

- Alois Knabl (born 1992), Austrian triathlete
- Joseph Knabl (1819–1881), Austrian sculptor
- Karl Knabl (1850–1904), German painter
- Richard Knabl (1789–1874), Austrian parish priest and epigraphist

== See also ==
- Knab, Knabb, Knabe, Knabl, Knap, Knape, Knapp, Knappe
- Knoop, Knop, Knopp, Knops, Knopf
