= Knippel =

Knipel is a German surname. Notable people with the surname include:

- Anja Knippel, German middle-distance runner
- Dorival Knippel, better known as Yustrich, Brazilian footballer and manager
