= Mary Knep =

English actress (died 1681)

Mary Knep (died 1681), also Knepp, Nepp, Knip, or Knipp, was an English actress and one of the first generation of female performers to appear on the public stage during the Restoration era.

== Acting career ==
Knep was primarily a singer and dancer, but "developed into a first-rate actress". She began her career with the King's Company, which was under the management of Thomas Killigrew.

She made her debut in the title role of Jonson's Epicene on 1 June 1664. Before this, she had been cast as Lucetta in Killigrew's 1664 planned production of his Thomaso, with an all-female cast, but this had been cancelled before completion.

Knep played major and minor roles in a range of productions of the 1660s and 1670s, including:

- the Widow in Beaumont and Fletcher's The Scornful Lady, 1666
- Guiomar in Fletcher and Massinger's The Custom of the Country, 1667
- Alibech in Dryden's The Indian Emperour, the 1667 revival
- Asteria in Dryden's The Maiden Queen, 1667
- Beatrix in Dryden's An Evening's Love, 1668
- Aminta in Fletcher and Massinger's The Sea Voyage, 1668
- Nakar and Felicia in Dryden's Tyrannick Love, 1669
- Lady Flippant in Wycherly's Love in a Wood, 1671
- Hyppolita in Dryden's The Assignation, 1672
- Lady Fidget in Wycherly's The Country Wife, 1675
- Eliza in Wycherly's The Plain Dealer, 1676
- Mrs. Dorothy in d'Urfey's Trick for Trick, 1678 — her last known role.

In addition to playing these and other parts, Knep also sang and danced in plays and spoke Prologues and Epilogues.

She never achieved the same fame as her younger contemporary Nell Gwyn; in 1672 Knep secured the lead female role in The Assignation, but the play was a flop.

== Personal life ==
Knep was reportedly "the wife of a Smithfield horsedealer, and the mistress of Pepys" — or at least (according to Cunningham) "she granted him a share of her favours". Scholars disagree on the full extent of the Pepys/Knep relationship; but much of what we know about Knep comes from Samuel Pepys' famous private diary.

Pepys first met Knep on 6 December 1665; he described her as "pretty enough, but the most excellent, mad-humoured thing, and sings the noblest that I ever heard in my life." He called her husband "an ill, melancholy, jealous-looking fellow" and suspected him of abusing her. Knep provided Pepys with backstage access, and was a conduit for theatrical and social gossip. When they wrote notes to each other, Pepys signed himself "Dapper Dickey," while Knep was "Barbary Allen" (a popular song that was an item in her musical repertory).

She may have been a mistress of Sir Charles Sedley, and in the late 1670s she became the mistress of actor Joseph Haines.

Knep had at least one child, a son born in June 1666. She died in childbirth in 1681.
