= Julius Knipl, Real Estate Photographer =

Weekly comic strip

- Author: Ben Katchor
- Launch date: 1988
- Syndicate: Self-syndicated
- Genre: Humor

Detail from Julius Knipl, Real Estate Photographer, episode 326, 1994

Julius Knipl, Real Estate Photographer was a weekly comic strip written and drawn by Ben Katchor from 1988 to 1998. It was first published in the New York Press and subsequently self-syndicated to various alternative weekly newspapers including The Washington DC City Paper, Chicago NewCity, Philadelphia City Paper, San Francisco Weekly, The Forward (English-language), The Village Voice and others.

Katchor embodies his love of the fading small-business community in an imaginary East Coast city in the title character, a small businessman who wanders the streets taking pictures and being sidetracked into surreal escapades. Strips often depict Knipl's chance encounters with obscure, marginal businesses (e.g. a company that distributes newspaper weights to newsstands), eccentric hobbyists, and enigmatic details of the urban landscape. There is rarely continuity between the strips, and Knipl is the only recurring character.

A collection of Julius Knipl strips was published in 1991 by Penguin Books (as a RAW One-Shot) as Cheap Novelties: The Pleasures of Urban Decay. Another collection was published in 1996 by Little, Brown and Company under the title Julius Knipl, Real Estate Photographer: Stories. Pantheon Books published a third volume of strips, The Beauty Supply District, in 2000. Each book includes one long story in addition to the self-contained weekly strips. Translated collections of the strip in French and Japanese have also been released.

NPR's Weekend Edition Saturday ran audio versions of several Julius Knipl stories in 1995 and 1996, narrated by Katchor and starring Jerry Stiller in the title role.

The word knipl means roughly "nest egg" or housewife hidden savings in Yiddish.

== Publication ==
In 1988 publisher Russ Smith approached Raw co-editor Art Spiegelman about comic strips for the weekly alternative newspaper New York Press. Spiegelman recommended Katchor, whom he had published in Raw. Katchor has since produced the strip weekly, and it has been carried by other alternative weeklies as well, such as The Forward and The Village Voice.

When the Village Voice canceled the strip in 1995, Katchor set up an illuminated "Julius Knipl Reading Box" for the public to read his new installments, on display in the window of a B&H Dairy or outside his neighborhood Papaya King.

Strips from the series have appeared in the collections Cheap Novelties: The Pleasures of Urban Decay (1991), Julius Knipl, Real Estate Photographer: Stories (1996), Julius Knipl, Real Estate Photographer: The Beauty Supply (2000).

== Style and analysis ==
Katchor draws the strip in a loose, sketchy pen-and-ink style overlaid with a gray watercolor wash. The backgrounds are detailed and drawn from a wide variety of shifting perspectives. A typical strip is made up of eight or nine panels captioned with crooked, hand-lettered boxes. The captions and drawings often follow independent narrative threads, sometimes with ironic effects, with the captions contradicting or reinforcing the visuals.

The comic strip portrays a fictional East Coast city populated by a working-class immigrant demographic. The setting features hypothetical small businesses designed to evoke historical New York prior to the prevalence of corporate chain establishments.
