= Knappe =

Knappe is a German surname literally meaning "young attendant, servant, squire". Notable people with the surname include:

- Alexander Knappe (born 1989), German golfer
- Andreas Knappe (born 1991), Danish American football player
- Edwin Knappe (1884–1971), American machinist and politician
- Herbert Knappe (1891–?), German Empire military aviator
- Kurt Knappe (1918–1943), German military aviator
- Siegfried Knappe (1917–2008), German army officer

== See also ==
- Knappe Tunnel, Norwegian tunnel
- Knapper (surname)
- Knab, Knabb, Knabe, Knabl, Knap, Knape, Knapp, Knappe
- Knoop, Knop, Knopp, Knops, Knopf
