= Knap =

Knap is a surname, and may refer to:

- Josef Knap (1900–1973), Czech writer, poet and literary critic
- Ted Knap (1920–2023), American journalist
- Tony Knap (1914–2011), college football head coach at Utah State, Boise State, and UNLV

== See also ==
- Knab, Knabb, Knabe, Knabl, Knap, Knape, Knapp, Knappe
- Knoop, Knop, Knopp, Knops, Knopf
