= Knabb =

Knabb is a surname. Notable people with the name include:

- Ken Knabb (born 1945), American writer, translator, and theorist
- Rick Knabb (born 1979), American meteorologist

== See also ==
- Knab, Knabb, Knabe, Knabl, Knap, Knape, Knapp, Knappe
- Knoop, Knop, Knopp, Knops, Knopf
- Knibb
