= Knab (surname) =

Knab is a surname. Notable people with the surname include:

- Armin Knab (1881–1951), German composer and musical writer
- Frederick Knab (1865–1918), artist and entomologist
- Johannes Knab (born 1946), former German cyclist
- Ruben Knab (born 1988), Dutch rower
- Sebastien Knab, (1632–1690), Roman Catholic prelate
- Ursula Knab (1929–1989), German track and field athlete
- Werner Knab (1908-1945), German military officer

== See also ==
- Knab, Knabb, Knabe, Knabl, Knap, Knape, Knapp, Knappe
- Knoop, Knop, Knopp, Knops, Knopf
