= Knape (surname) =

Knape is a Swedish surname. Notable people with the surname include:

- Anders Knape (born 1955), Swedish politician
- Bo Knape (born 1949), Swedish Olympic sailor
- Ulrika Knape (born 1955), Swedish Olympic diver

== See also ==
- Knab, Knabb, Knabe, Knabl, Knap, Knape, Knapp, Knappe
- Knoop, Knop, Knopp, Knops, Knopf
