= Knoop =

Knoop is a Dutch and Low German surname. Meaning "knot" and "button", it may have a metonymic origin referring to button maker. Notable people with the surname include:

- Abe Knoop (born 1963), Dutch football goalkeeper and goalkeeping coach
- Anneliese Knoop-Graf (1921–2009), German non-fiction writer
- Bobby Knoop (born 1938), American baseball player
- Edgar Knoop (born 1936), German contemporary painter and sculptor
- Etienne Knoops (born 1934), Belgian politician and Government Minister
- Franz Knoop (1875–1946), German biochemist
- Frederick Knoop (1878–1943), American metallurgist
  - Knoop hardness test, a microhardness test for very brittle materials developed by him
- Gerhard Knoop (1920–2009), Norwegian actor, stage producer and theatre director
- Gerhard Ouckama Knoop (1861–1913), German novelist
- Hans Knoop (born 1943), Dutch journalist
- Johann Knoop (1846–1882), Russian collector of musical instruments ("Baron Knoop"), son of Ludwig
- Johann Hermann Knoop (1706–1769), German-born Dutch gardener and pomologist
- Johannes Knoops (born c.1970), American architect
- Ludwig Knoop (1821–1894), German cotton merchant and businessman
- Otto Knoop (1853–1931), German folklorist and collector of fairy tales
- Rick Knoop (born 1953), American race car driver
- Savannah Knoop (born c.1980), half-sister of the partner of American writer Laura Albert (JT LeRoy)
- Willem Jan Knoop (1811–1894), Dutch lieutenant-general, military historian, and politician

== See also ==
- Knop (disambiguation)
- Koop (disambiguation)
- Noop (disambiguation)
- Knab, Knabb, Knabe, Knabl, Knap, Knape, Knapp, Knappe
- Knoop, Knop, Knopp, Knops, Knopf
