= Aspen Healthcare =

British private medical company

Aspen Healthcare is a private medical company, established in 1988, based in London. It is not connected with Aspen Pharmacare, the pharmaceutical company in UMhlanga, South Africa. It was a subsidiary of United Surgical Partners International of Dallas.

In early 2015, Welltower from Toledo, Ohio purchased all four of the company's London hospitals for £226 million. The hospitals were leased back to Aspen which continues to operate them. The deal included Holly House Hospital, Highgate Hospital and Parkside Hospital (both private hospitals), and Cancer Centre London. They were leased to Aspen for 25-year terms.

Tenet Healthcare based in Dallas, bought the company in 2015. It sold the company to NMC Health (a company in Abu Dhabi) in August 2018 for £10 million. It runs Highgate Hospital, Parkside Hospital in Wimbledon, and Claremont Hospital in Sheffield. About half of the company's income comes from orthopaedics and oncology. Less than 30% comes from the NHS. The company was acquired by NMC Health in August 2018.
