= Lindy Boggs Medical Center =

Abandoned hospital in Louisiana, United States

- Tenet Healthcare
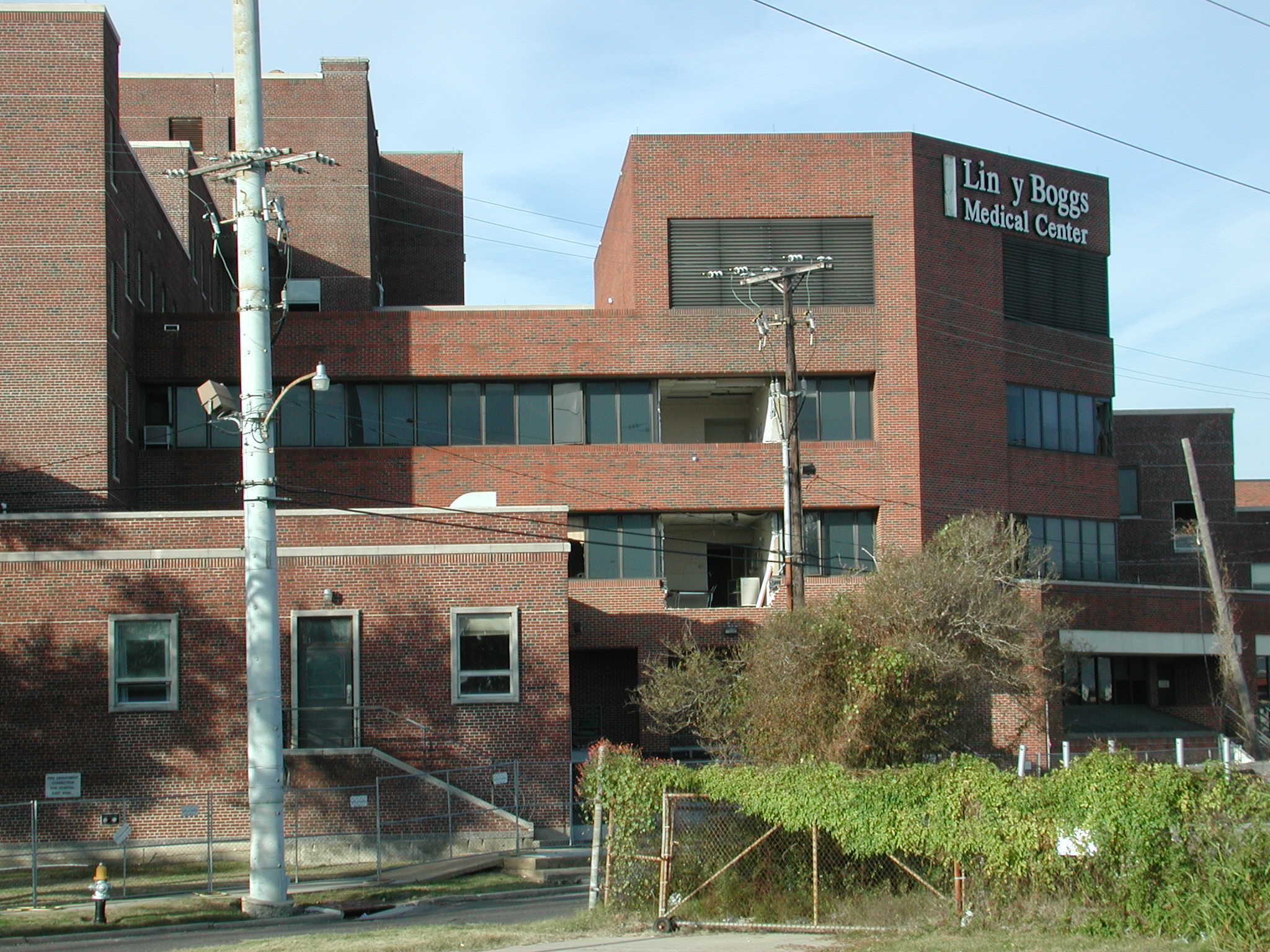
- Lindy Boggs Medical Center in 2007

Geography
- Location: 301 N Norman C Francis Parkway (formerly 301 N. Jefferson Davis Pkwy), Mid-City New Orleans, Louisiana, United States
- Coordinates: 29°58′22″N 90°5′35″W

Organization
- Network: Tenet Healthcare Corporation (Louisiana System)

Services
- Emergency department: Yes
- Beds: 187

History
- Founded: 1920s
- Closed: September 2005
- Demolished: Late 2026

Links
- Lists: Hospitals in Louisiana

Lindy Boggs Medical Center, formerly known as Mercy Hospital and also known as Lindy Boggs Hospital, is a now-abandoned 187-bed acute care hospital operated by Tenet Healthcare located in Mid-City New Orleans, Louisiana. The hospital provided many services, including emergency care, critical care, and organ transplantation services. It was abandoned in the aftermath of Hurricane Katrina, a destructive Category 5 hurricane that hit New Orleans, Louisiana on August 29, 2005, and the even more destructive failure of the Federal levee system causing extensive flooding, over 1,390 deaths in the city, and over $125 billion in damages. In August 2026, demolition began on the facility.

== History ==
Mercy Hospital was founded in the 1920s. The original Mercy Hospital was on Annunciation Street in the Lower Garden District neighborhood; the current building in Mid-City was constructed in 1959. In the 1990s, Mercy Hospital merged with Southern Baptist Hospital, and the two hospitals operated together as Mercy-Baptist Medical Center. The hospital was subsequently acquired by Tenet Healthcare and renamed Lindy Boggs Medical Center in honor of Democratic Congresswoman and Ambassador Lindy Boggs, who became the first woman in Louisiana to be elected to the House of Representatives.

== Hurricane Katrina ==
When Hurricane Katrina hit New Orleans on August 29, 2005, the hospital was at full census. Many employees' and patients' families decided to take shelter at the facility as well, thinking that they would be safer and more comfortable. When the levee system failed on August 30, however, many people found themselves trapped in the facility with no way out after water flooded the emergency generators in the basement which caused power to go out. Elevators were inoperable, there was no running water, no waste disposal, low food storage, and no TV or radio to get news updates. On the first day alone, 19 people inside the hospital died. Patients had to be hand carried up stairwells after water reached the first floor of the facility.

Many patients, especially those recovering from risky organ transplantation procedures, were not able to be given the medicines they needed most and, since both the power and the generators had failed, were without vital services such as mechanical ventilation and cardiac monitoring. There was no blood for transfusions and very little medication besides morphine. Temperature rose to as high as 105 degrees, increasing the death risk of the patients, especially those in the intensive care unit. For a while, the staff used hand pumps to blow oxygen into the patients' lungs. A major evacuation effort took place and, thanks to the initiative and hard work of both the hospital staff and the rescue workers, mostly everyone was able to be rescued, despite reports of widespread looting and gunfire. However, the total death toll was 45.

The evacuation divided people into three groups: "C", those that were in critical condition, "B", those that had medical problems but not in critical condition, and "A" for those who could walk on their own. The evacuation method drew much criticism because group A, which consisted of those able to walk normally, was evacuated first and not group C, which consisted of those in critical condition. Those people marked "C" were not evacuated until Thursday morning, September 1.

Since Hurricane Katrina forced the facility to close, Mid-City New Orleans has been without vital health care services, including an emergency department.

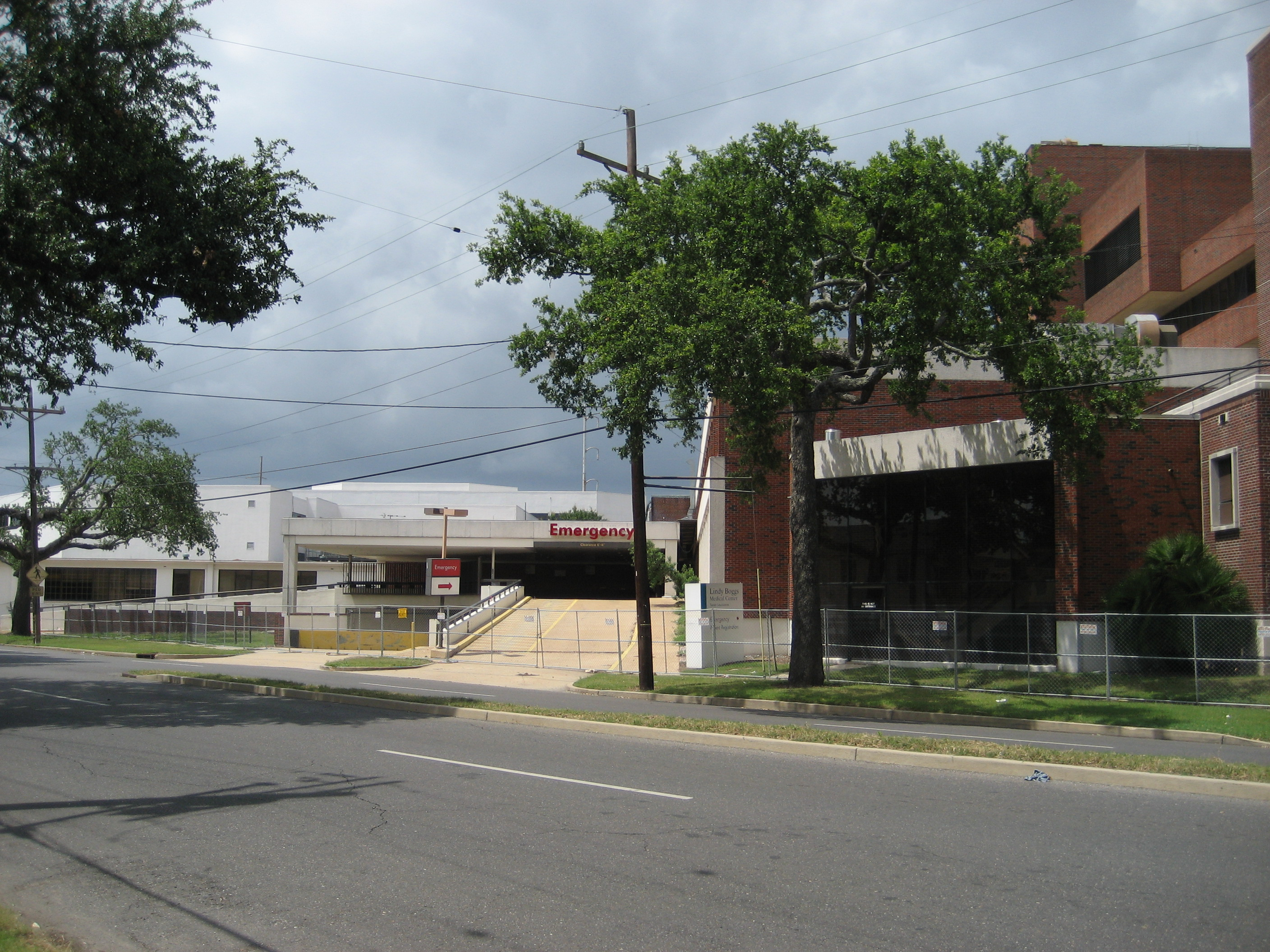
The ramp leading to the Emergency Department Entrance as seen in 2007

== After Katrina ==
After the storm, Tenet Healthcare sold the facility to Georgia-based Victory Real Estate Investments. The same real estate group also purchased neighboring properties with plans for a retail development along Bienville Street but the project never moved forward.

In 2010, the entire Lindy Boggs complex of buildings and a portion of the surface parking was purchased by St. Margaret's Daughters for $4.2 million. St. Margaret's, a Catholic non-profit organization, spent $37 million to renovate more than 100,000 square feet in a former medical office building on the site. A 112-bed nursing facility named "St. Margaret's at Mercy" opened in the renovated space in 2013.

St. Margaret's originally planned to open a cardiovascular hospital in the remaining portion of the medical center. However, a partnership with the State of Louisiana fell through, which made the project financially unfeasible.

In August 2017, work began to clean up the undeveloped portions of the property. A grant from the Environmental Protection Agency paid for asbestos removal and the Louisiana Department of Environmental Quality paid for removal of underground storage tanks. Workers also pumped stagnant water out of the building, which had been sitting stagnant since Hurricane Katrina.

The site was known in the area to be filled with vandals, squatters, and urban explorers after abandonment.

Lindy Boggs in August 2026, after demolition began.

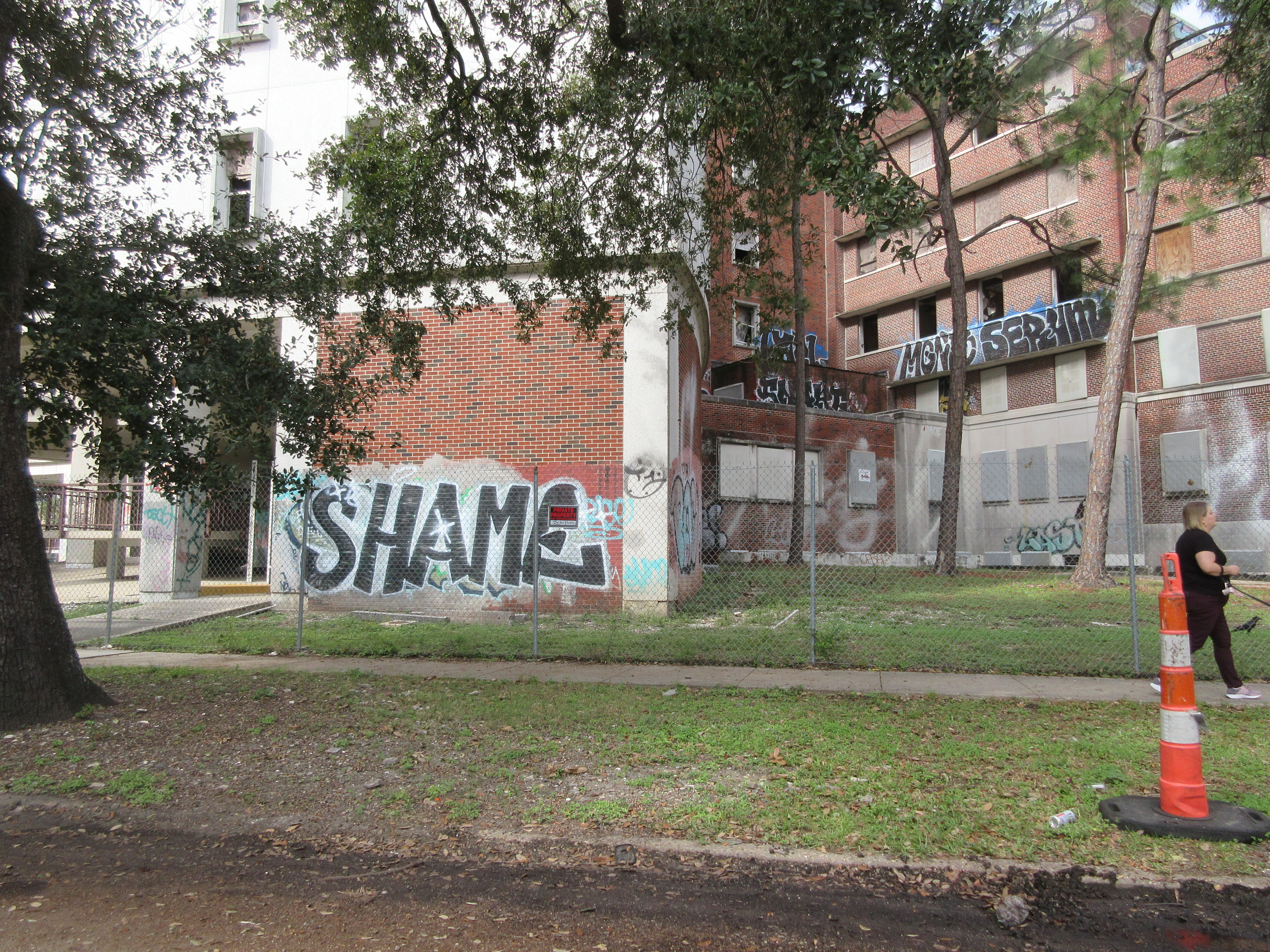
Part of the long-derelict hospital complex in November 2024

Ideas idea of an assisted living facility for patients with memory care needs was discussed in 2017, but scrapped not long after. On 8 June 2021, the property was sold to Woodward Design+Build, which claimed to plan to bring immediate improvements to the property and its graffiti-covered buildings.

The derelict hospital was used as a primary filming location for the independent horror film The Vampires of New Orleans in early 2026.

After decades of delays, new owners, and scrapped projects, demolition of the Lindy Boggs Medical Center began in August 2026.

== See also ==
- St. Luke Medical Center
- Charity Hospital
