= The Vampires of New Orleans =

- Theatrical release poster
- Directed by: Andrew Rakich
- Written by: Andrew Rakich
- Produced by: Veronika Payton; Andrew Rakich
- Starring: Courtnee Carter; Andrew Rakich; Mekhai Lee; Benton Guinness; Linnea Gregg; Monica R. Harris; Josh Popa; Carl Sailor; Kendra Unique
- Cinematography: Eduardo Urueña
- Edited by: Andrew Rakich
- Music by: Dillon M. DeRosa
- Release dates: September 27, 2026 (New Orleans, Louisiana); October 1, 2026 (United States)
- Running time: 155 minutes
- Country: United States
- Language: English

The Vampires of New Orleans is a 2026 hybrid documentary/horror film written and directed by Andrew Rakich. Half of the film is a narrative feature about a trio of vampires preying upon the city of New Orleans. This narrative is intercut with a documentary exploring the history of vampire lore in the city, featuring interviews with various tour guides, historians, and local figures, in addition to characters from the film's story. It is Rakich's second film following 2023's The Sudbury Devil.

== Plot ==
On the streets of New Orleans, Nate picks up a prostitute named Shania and lures her into an abandoned hospital where his master—a vampire named Jean-Louis D'Hemecourt—kills Shania and feeds on her blood. Shania's death is ruled an overdose by the police, but her sister Brigitte experiences a vision of the murder and soon begins her own investigation. Brigitte's boyfriend Steve is skeptical and believes she's experiencing trauma-related psychosis.

With the help of her aunt Saffron and the voodoo witch Dr. Tom, Brigitte discovers that a trio of vampires led by D'Hemecourt, including a Confederate widow named Madame Josephine Macarti and the Axeman of New Orleans, have been preying on the black citizens of New Orleans for over a hundred years. Brigitte, Saffron, and Dr. Tom track down the Axeman to his lair in an attempt to kill him. The Axeman awakes, mortally wounding Saffron as Brigitte drives a stake through his heart. As Saffron dies, Nate arrives and shoots Dr. Tom before chloroforming and kidnapping Brigitte.

Brigitte awakens caged in the abandoned hospital where she is taunted by Nate. Meanwhile, Steve is found by D'Hemecourt and Madame Josephine, who transform him into a vampire as revenge for the Axeman. When D'Hemecourt returns to the hospital with the transformed Steve, Nate becomes furious that D'Hemecourt chose to transform Steve into a vampire instead of transforming him. Nate frees Brigitte in retaliation, who promptly finds and kills Madame Josephine as she attempts to seduce Steve.

The next morning, Steve is horrified at what he has become and after professing his love for Brigitte steps into the sunlight, dying instantly. Brigitte then descends into the basement beneath the hospital to kill D'Hemecourt. D'Hemecourt recaptures Brigitte, however, and prepares to feast on her blood. Before he can kill her, the spirits of Dr. Tom, Saffron, and Shania intervene and Brigitte decapitates D'Hemecourt, seemingly killing him.

Years later, Nate is getting a drink at a bar when D'Hemecourt reappears, having killed the bartender. D'Hemecourt rips out Nate's eyes, announcing that he intends to move in with Nate so that he can learn the habits of modern society and keep feeding forever.

== Cast ==
- Courtnee Carter as Brigitte Jackson
- Andrew Rakich as Jean-Louis D'Hemecourt
- Mekhai Lee as Dr. Tom
- Benton Guinness as Nate Debney
- Linnea Gregg as Madame Josephine Macarti
- Monica R. Harris as Saffron Jackson
- Josh Popa as Steve Farricker
- Carl Sailor as the Axeman of New Orleans
- Kendra Unique as Shania Jackson
- Matthew Van Gessel as Father Randall

== Production ==
Much of the production was shot in the derelict Lindy Boggs Medical Center, which had been abandoned since the aftermath of Hurricane Katrina in 2005. Production wrapped in March 2026 and the hospital was later demolished in August 2026.

== Reception ==
Jackson LeJeune of Classic Chicago Magazine gave The Vampires of New Orleans a 7 out of 10 rating, commending the film's performances, cinematography, and score while describing the script as "rather stock." He wrote, "The script and plot are nothing to write home about, and the documentary would be rather anemic on its own, but the technical work and the uniquely-assembled structure elevate the two into a genuinely interesting product worthy of your time." The film was also praised by Giallo Julian of Gory Tory and El Rob Hubbard of 366 Weird Movies, who wrote, "It may throw audiences expecting a more conventional vampire tale, but it's rewarding for those willing to set expectations aside and go with the flow." Sam Theriault of Cinemasters similarly described it as "devilishly entertaining, and an unashamedly unique film whose cast and crew's passion for the project permeates every aspect of production."
