= Clara Seippel Webster =

American physician

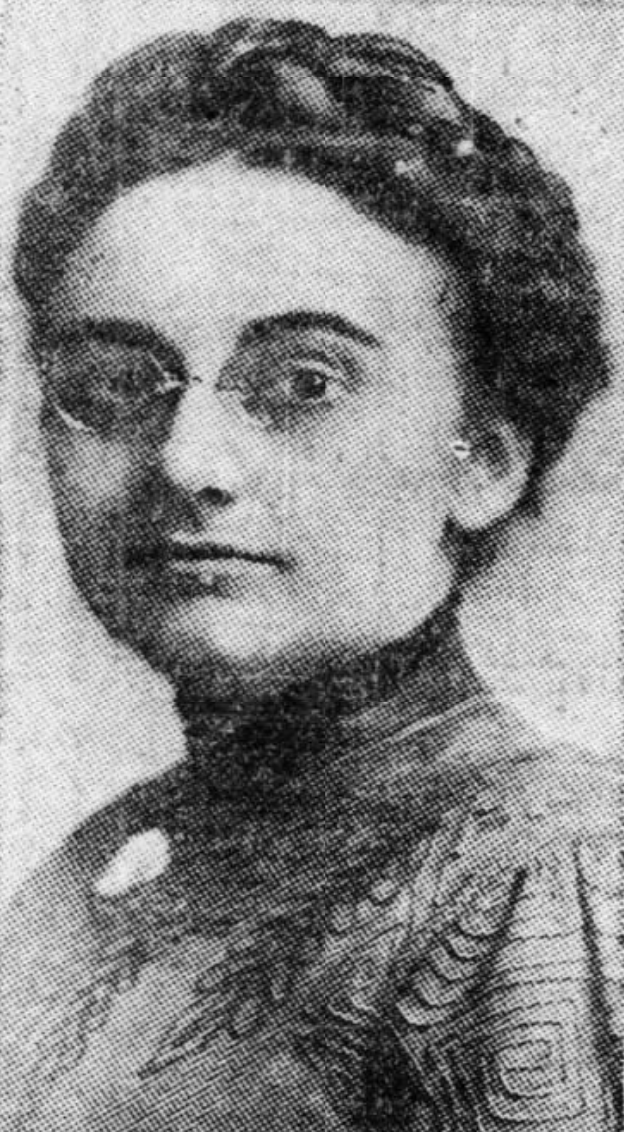
- Clara Seippel (later Webster), from a 1912 publication
- Born: Clara Pauline Seippel; May 30, 1877; Chicago, Illinois, U.S.
- Died: April 6, 1965 (age 87)
- Other name: Clara Seippel Widdowson
- Occupations: Physician, academic dean

Clara Pauline Seippel Webster (May 30, 1877 – April 6, 1965) was an American physician and college dean, based in Chicago until the 1920s, and then in Tucson, Arizona.

== Early life and education ==
Seippel was born in Chicago, the daughter of Frederick Seippel and Caroline Kernwein Seippel. Both of her parents were born in Germany. She graduated from the University of Illinois College of Medicine in 1907. She gained further training in gynecological surgery and pathology.

== Career ==
=== In Chicago ===
She was sued for libel by a fellow doctor in 1909. In 1912, she was the first woman to sit on a jury in Chicago. She was a Chicago city employee as assistant city physician, assigned to the Cook County Hospital and the Frances Home. She was also president of the Medical Women's Club of Chicago. She lectured in Chicago and nationally on the topic of social hygiene.

Seippel spoke against "flapperism". She proposed that "extremity in dress has caused a lowering in the birthrate" because (she reasoned) young women's physical development is impaired by shorter skirts and bare arms. She voiced concerns about the toll of smoking and poor nutrition and sleep habits on working women's health. She spoke in favorite of women's sports, and women's careers, saying "The prospects for women are growing bright and brighter, and year after year she's taking more responsible and more noteworthy positions."

=== In Tucson ===
Webster moved to Tucson, Arizona, at first in the winter but later full-time, and gained her Arizona medical license in 1923. She was the third woman admitted to the Pima County Medical Society. In 1923 she spoke before a meeting of the Arizona State Nurses Association, and to the Business and Professional Woman's Club of Tucson. She was dean of women and medical adviser to women students at the University of Arizona from 1927 to 1929. She resigned her university job and traveled to Vienna for further training in 1929; she edited a medical journal while she lived there.

In the 1930s, she was an attending physician at St. Mary's Hospital in Tucson. Webster was an incorporator of the Tucson Fine Arts Association when it was founded in 1936.

== Publications ==
- "Venereal Diseases in Children" (1912)
- "Medical Aspect of Women's Ills in Industry" (1921)
- "Tuberculosis of the breast" (1939)

== Personal life and legacy ==
Seippel married lawyer Robert A. Widdowson in 1915. The Widdowsons legally changed their surname to Webster in 1927. She died in 1965, at the age of 87, after fracturing her femur. The Dr. Clara Seippel Webster Foundation is a philanthropic fund based in Las Vegas.
