= Lev Elterman =

American surgeon

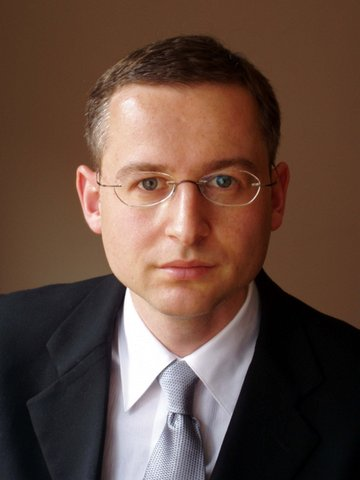
- Dr. Lev Eltman
- Born: January 14, 1969 (age 57); Leningrad, Russian SFSR, Soviet Union
- Education: Rush Medical College
- Occupations: Physician, Chief of Urology
- Spouse: Inna Elterman
- Children: 2

Lev Elterman (born January 14, 1969, in Leningrad, USSR) immigrated with his family in 1989 to the United States where he attended Rush Medical College. He graduated at the top of his class with a number of awards and then went on to urological residency at Rush University Medical Center.

He is serving as chief of the Urology section at Louis A. Weiss Memorial Hospital.

In 2001 Dr. Elterman founded the Chicago Association of Russian-speaking Physicians, a medical society devoted to continuing education of physicians of the Chicago area. He is also the president of this organization.

He is the founding chairman (2011) of the International Russian-speaking Urological Society, an organization dedicated to promoting highest standards in urological education for Russian speaking urologists around the world. This organization is recognized by the American Urological Association.

In 2019 Dr. Elterman was recognized as a top doctor for women by Chicago Magazine.

== Publications ==
- Levine LA, Elterman L, Rukstalis DB (1996). "Treatment of subclinical intraurethral human papilloma virus infection with Interferon Alpha-2b". Urology. 47 (4): 553–557. doi:10.1016/S0090-4295(99)80494-4. PMID 8638367.
- Levine LA, Elterman L (1997). "Peyronie's Disease and its Medical Management". In Hellstrom WJ (ed.). Male Infertility and Sexual Dysfunction. New York: Springer. pp. 474–480. doi:10.1007/978-1-4612-1848-7_35. ISBN 978-1-4612-7310-3.
- Levine LA, Elterman L (1998). "Urethroplasty following total phallic reconstruction". Journal of Urology. 160 (2): 378–382. doi:10.1016/S0022-5347(01)62900-8. PMID 9679882.
- Elterman L, Ekbal S (1999). "An open prospective study of the safety and efficiency transuratheral ablation in patients with trilobar benign prostatic hyperplasia. Abstract 1168". Journal of Urology. 161: 304. doi:10.1097/00005392-199904020-00218.
- Guinan P, Rubenstein M, Shaw M, McKiel CF, Elterman L (1999). "African Americans Receive Therapy for Cure of Prostate Cancer st Rates Similar to Whites. Abstract 1382". Journal of Urology. 161: 357. doi:10.1097/00005392-199904020-00431.
- Elterman L, Bewsey K, Cs-Szabo G, Cole A, Levine LA (2000). "Connective tissue components of Peyronie's disease plaque. Abstract 748". Journal of Urology. 163: 169.
- Shaw M, Elterman L, Rubenstein M, McKiel CF Jr, Guinan P (June 2000). "Changes in radical prostatectomy and radiation therapy rates for African Americans and whites". Journal of the National Medical Association. 92 (6): 281–284. PMC 2640525. PMID 10918763.
- Levine LA, Elterman L (2001). "Nocturnal Penile Tumescence and Rigidity Testing". In Mulcahy JJ (ed.). Male sexual function: a guide to clinical management. Totowa, NJ: Humana Press. doi:10.1007/978-1-59259-098-8_9. ISBN 978-1-4757-5701-9.
- Latchamsetty KC, Elterman L, Coogan CL (September 2002). "Schwannoma of a seminal vesicle". Urology. 60 (3): 515. doi:10.1016/S0090-4295(02)01815-0. PMID 12350506.
- Lisek EW, Elterman L, McKiel CF Jr, Hoeksema J (2003). "Prostate Cancer". In Saclarides TJ, Millikan KW, Godellas CV (eds.). Surgical Oncology: An Algorithmic Approach for the General Surgeon. New York: Springer. pp. 460–476. ISBN 978-0-387-95201-7.
- Sobel D, Elterman L (2008). "Hematuria". In Saclarides TJ, Millikan KW, Godellas CV (eds.). Surgical Oncology: An Algorithmic Approach (2nd ed.). New York: Springer. pp. 273–275. doi:10.1007/978-0-387-75246-4_68. ISBN 978-0-387-75245-7.
- Elterman L (August 2012). "New Insights into the Medical Management of Idiopathic Male Infertility: What Works, What Does Not and Does it Matter?". Journal of Urology. 188 (2): 355–357. doi:10.1016/j.juro.2012.05.025. PMID 22704093.
- Tan WP, Papagiannopoulos D, Elterman L (July 2015). "Bear's Paw sign: A Classic Presentation of Xanthogranulomatous Pyelonephritis". Urology. 86 (2): e5–e6. doi:10.1016/j.urology.2015.04.033. PMID 26168999.
- Tan WP, Alexandrov P, Elterman L (2017). "Genital Dermatillomania". Current Urology. 11 (1): 54–56. doi:10.1159/000447195. PMC 5814777. PMID 29463978.
- Emerson JT, Geisenhoff AM, Chow AK, Elterman L (2019). "Ethical deliberation and management of attempted penile self-amputation in a male-to-female transgender person: case presentation and literature review". Scandinavian Journal of Urology. 53 (6): 441–443. doi:10.1080/21681805.2019.1653962. PMID 31432724.
