= Fasa (disambiguation) =

Fasa is an Iranian city.

Fasa or FASA may also refer to:

- FASA, an American publisher of role-playing games, wargames and boardgames
- FASA Studio or FASA Interactive, a spin-off videogame company
- Federated Ambulatory Surgery Association, a US nonprofit association representing the interests of ambulatory surgery centers (ASCs)
- Fasa County, a county in Fars province, Iran
- FASA-Renault, a former Spanish automobile manufacturing company
- FASA, Fellow of the American Statistical Association
- FASA, Fellow of the American Society of Anesthesiologists, See https://www.asahq.org/member-center/fasa

== See also ==
- Fassa, a minor Christian-democratic political party in the province of Trentino, Italy
