= Claremont Hospital =

- Spire Healthcare
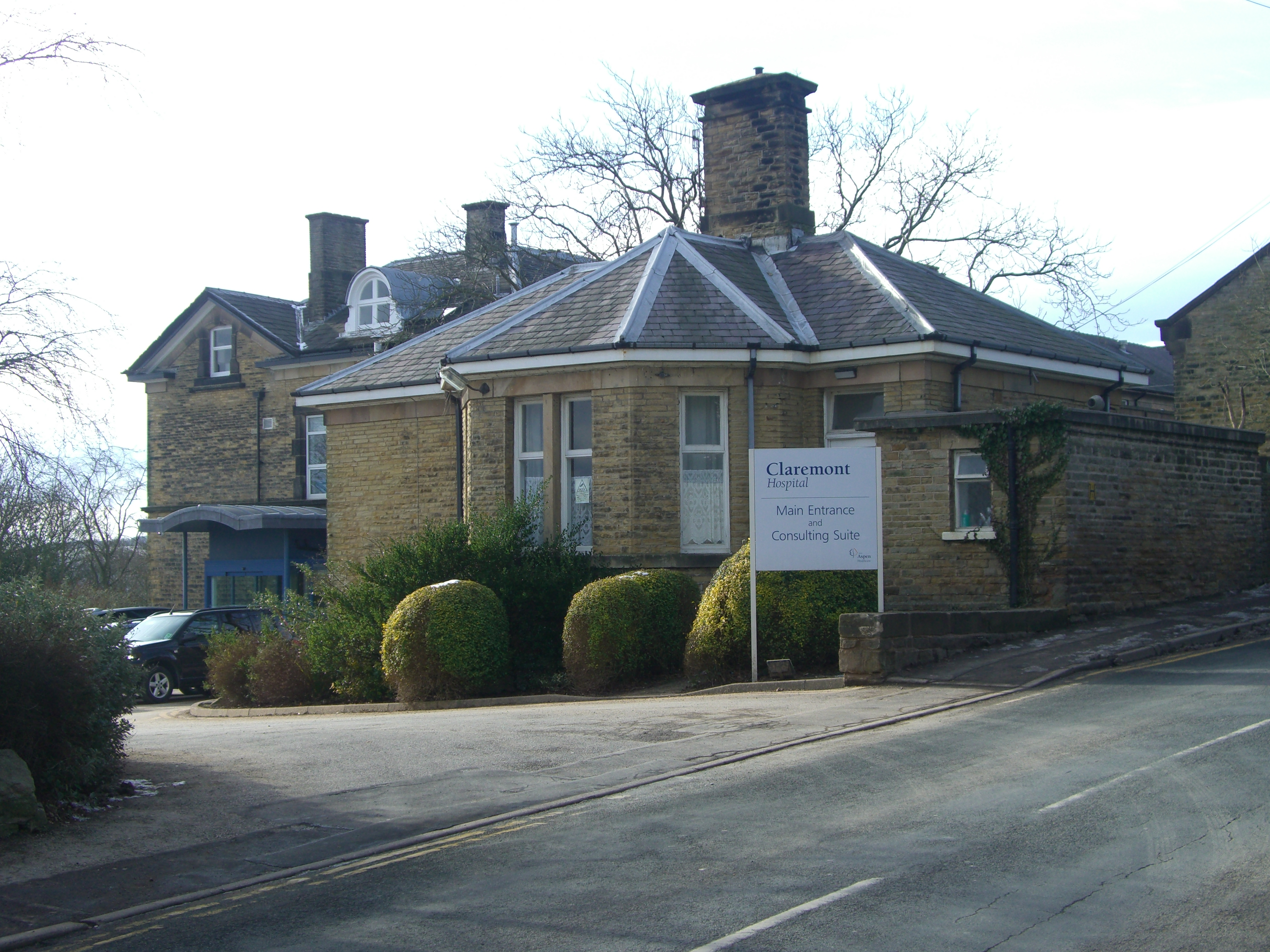
- The site entrance on Sandygate Road. The original 1890s building is visible in the background.

- Shown in South Yorkshire

Geography
- Location: Sheffield, England
- Coordinates: 53.375536°N 1.535685°W

Organisation
- Care system: Private

Services
- Emergency department: No

History
- Founded: 1831

Links
- Lists: Hospitals in England

Claremont Hospital is a private hospital situated in the City of Sheffield, England. It is located at 401 Sandygate Road in the suburb of Crosspool. It is managed by Spire Healthcare,

== History ==
=== Early history ===
The Claremont Hospital was set up by the Sisters of the Institute of Our Lady of Mercy, a religious institute which had been set up in Ireland in 1831 and came to Sheffield in 1883. The original hospital was opened in 1921 and was situated close to the city centre on Claremont Place on a site where the Royal Hallamshire Hospital now stands. In 1953 the Claremont Hospital was forced to move to its present location at Crosspool because the land on which it was situated was needed for the first phase of development of the Hallamshire Hospital. The new home of the hospital on Sandygate Road was a large house which had been constructed in the 1890s, this now stands at the main entrance to the hospital with the hospital being greatly expanded to the rear since 1953. In 1986, the Sisters of Mercy created the nearby Highbury convent from two semi-detached houses that had been purchased and this provided improved accommodation for the Sisters working at Claremont.

=== Post 1990 ===
In 1996 the Sisters of Mercy left Claremont Hospital and in 2001 it became part of the Hospital Management Trust, a registered charity which promotes the services of charitable and religious hospitals and care homes. In January 2012 the hospital was acquired by Aspen Healthcare. The hospital is a forty-one bed unit with three operating theatres and twelve consulting rooms. Its services include weight loss surgery, orthopaedic surgery, sports medicine, medical imaging, gynaecology and physiotherapy. The nearby Highbury Convent was acquired in the summer of 2012 and the company invested in new medical and surgical equipment.

Spire Healthcare acquired the hospital from Aspen Healthcare in September 2021.

== See also ==
- List of hospitals in England
