= Eric E. Whitaker =

Health Practitioner

Eric Whitaker

Personal details
- Born: 1964 or 1965 (age 60–61) Chicago, Illinois, U.S.
- Party: Democratic
- Education: Grinnell College (BA); Harvard University (MPH); University of Chicago (MD)

Eric E. Whitaker (born 1964 or 1965) is an American physician, public health practitioner, and health policy expert. He is a close friend of President Barack Obama.

== Education and career ==
Whitaker received his undergraduate degree in chemistry from Grinnell College in 1987. In 1993, he earned a master's degree in public health from the Harvard School of Public Health and a medical degree from the University of Chicago's Pritzker School of Medicine.

Whitaker was most recently the Executive Vice President, Strategic Affiliations and Associate Dean of Community-based Research at the Pritzker School of Medicine. He was responsible for leading the school's Urban Health Initiative, linking patient care to improving the health of residents of the South Side of Chicago via teaching and research. Until September 2007, he served as Director of the Illinois Department of Public Health (IDPH).

In this capacity, he oversaw an agency with a budget of $450 million with over 1,200 employees statewide, as well as 3 laboratories and seven regional offices. Prior to his appointment at the State, Whitaker was an attending physician in Internal Medicine at Cook County Hospital in Chicago and a member of its Collaborative Research Unit. His research interests include HIV/AIDS prevention and minority health, particularly for Black males.

Starting in 2018, Whitaker has been co-owner and -operator of Los Angeles-based Pipeline Health, which in January 2019 bought Tenet Healthcare's three remaining Chicago-area for-profit hospitals: Louis A. Weiss Memorial Hospital (Chicago); Westlake Hospital (Melrose Park, Illinois); and West Suburban Medical Center (Oak Park, Illinois). In February 2019, Whitaker announced that Pipeline Health would close Westlake Hospital within five months, keeping the others open. On April 9, 2019, the hospital "suspended services."

=== Recognition and achievements ===
Whitaker helped found Project Brotherhood: A Black Men’s Clinic, a weekly clinic for African-American men housed in Woodlawn Adult Health Center on Chicago's South Side, which is affiliated with the Cook County Bureau of Health Services.

In 1991, Whitaker represented the 30,000 members of the American Medical Student Association (AMSA) as its president while testifying twice before the U.S. Congress regarding national health insurance and minority health issues.

In 2003, he received the Laureate Award from the American College of Physicians.

In November 2003, he was named as one of Crain’s Chicago Business's "Forty under Forty", rising stars under age 40 in Chicago business and government.

=== Controversy ===
Whitaker served as director of Illinois Department of Public Health (IDPH) from 2003 until 2007. His chief of staff at the IDPH, Quinshaunta R. Golden, was subsequently indicted on seven federal counts including bribery, theft, witness tampering, mail fraud and obstruction of justice for allegedly “conspiring with state grant recipients to divert federal money [as much as $433,000] into her own pockets and then trying to cover it up” according to the Chicago Tribune. (Golden pleaded guilty in 2014 and was sentenced in 2015 to a federal prison term of 96 months for bribery and kickbacks "related to $13 million in grant and contract funds awarded at her direction" as well as for obstructing a federal grand jury. Golden was ordered to pay $1,000,000 in restitution to IDPH, jointly and severally with Roxanne Jackson, a defendant in a separate but related case.)

Whitaker left the Illinois Department of Public Health in late 2007 to work with Michelle Obama at the University of Chicago's School of Medicine, along with Ms. Golden, where he was executive vice president of strategic affiliations and associate dean.
