= St. Luke Medical Center =

Hospital in California, US, 1933–2002

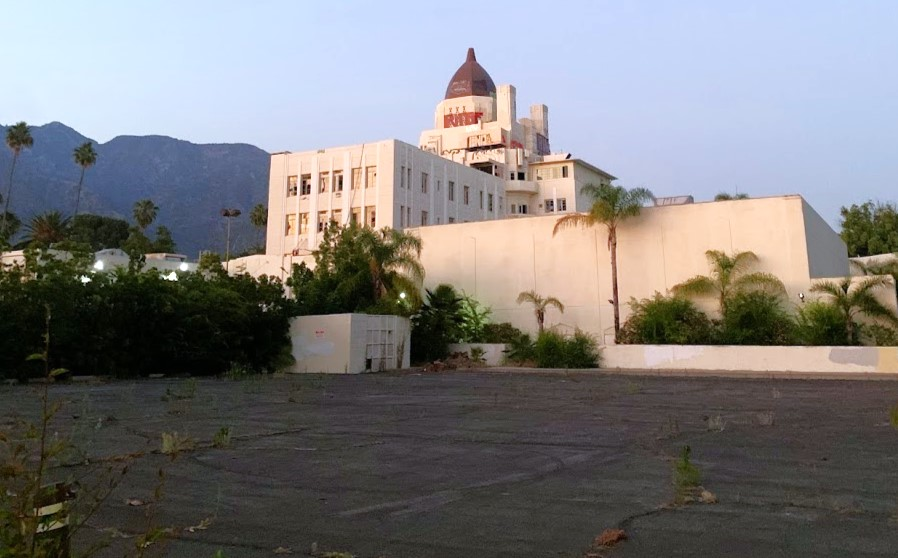
- The exterior of the hospital c. June 2023

Geography
- Location: 2632 E Washington Blvd, Pasadena, California, United States
- Coordinates: 34°10′09.63″N 118°05′46.89″W

Organization
- Care system: Tenet Healthcare
- Type: Community hospital
- Religious affiliation: Sisters of St. Joseph of Orange
- Affiliated university: University of Southern California
- Patron: St. Luke
- Network: Tenet Health Systems

Services
- Standards: Joint Commission
- Emergency department: Level III trauma center
- Beds: 165

History
- Founded: 1933
- Closed: 2002

Links
- Website: https://web.archive.org/web/20010518071749/http://www.stlukemedical.com/home/home.cfm
- Lists: Hospitals in California

St. Luke Medical Center is an abandoned 165-bed hospital located in the northeastern region of Pasadena, California. Upon opening in 1933, the hospital was one of only 2 hospitals to serve the city of Pasadena for nearly 70 years, in tandem with Huntington Hospital on the western side of the city. St Luke ultimately closed in 2002 due to financial issues stemming from the hospital's parent company Tenet Healthcare. The hospital has since become a famous location for filming as it has appeared in various music videos, TV shows, and movies over the years.

== History ==
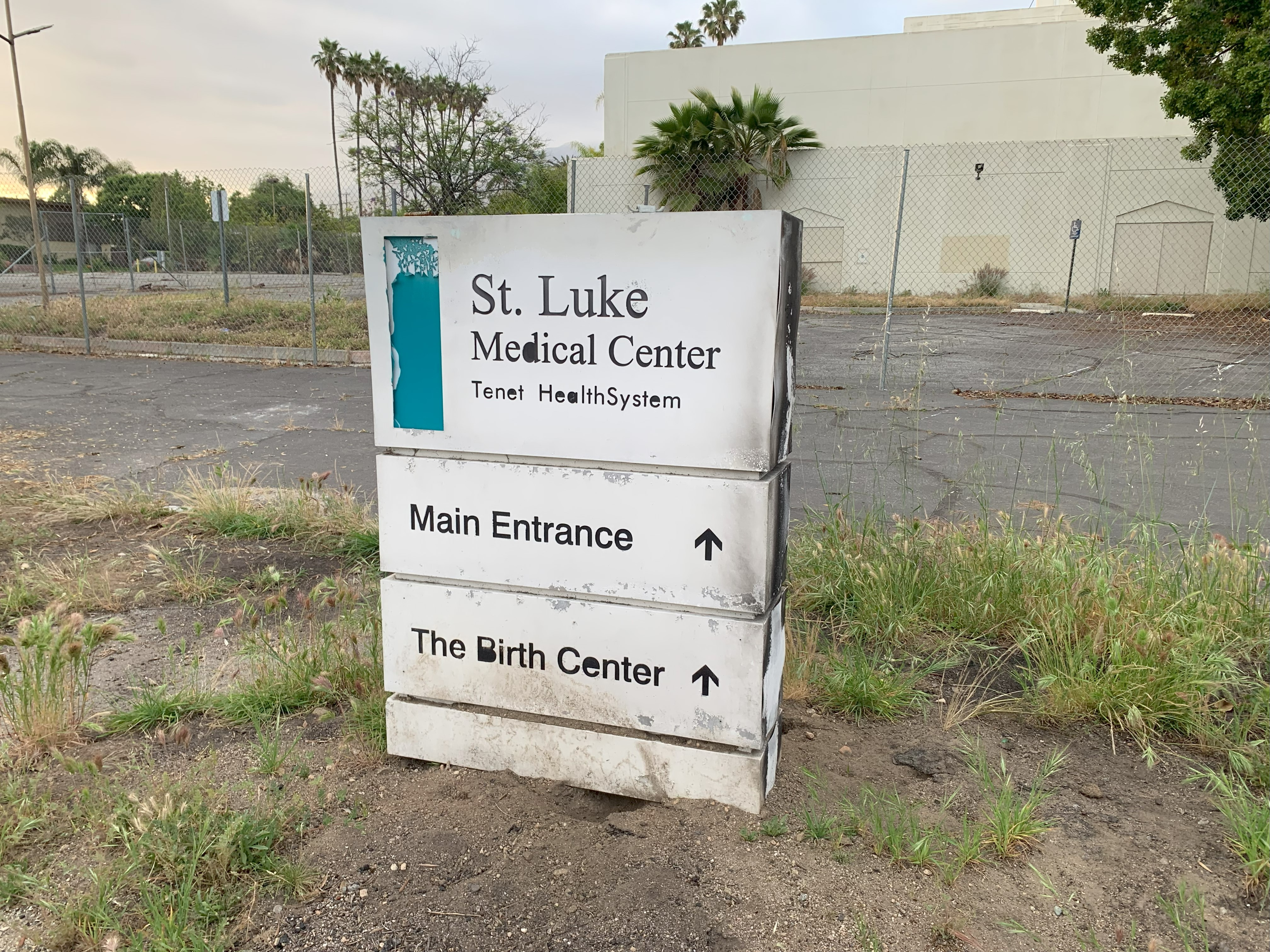
The Hospital's southern entrance sign charred and faded; following the Eaton Fires in 2025

The hospital was originally built in 1933 to serve the Northeastern communities of Pasadena, Altadena, and Sierra Madre. The hospital was founded by the Sisters of St. Joseph of Orange to act as a medical facility for the local area in tandem with Huntington Hospital (opened in 1892). Multiple wings were constructed to branch out of the main building over the years. The hospital also included an original chapel on the Northeast corner of the property, the critical care wing was originally constructed in 1945, the original operation wings were completed in 1948. In 1976 another wing was added to increase the number of beds of use for patient care, by 1984, two new office buildings and a co-generation facility were also added. Despite the renovations; the hospital was negatively reviewed in several local news articles in 1986 criticizing its antiquated buildings and limited capacity of patients housed, prompting the building to receive its final two structural additions in 1988 and 1990 respectively. The hospital was purchased by Oronda Health Group in 1994 and continued to receive further funding to modernize the facility following Oronda's acquisition by Tenet Healthcare in 1997. St Luke would also sign into a contractual affiliation with Keck School of Medicine of USC in 1994.

=== Decline ===
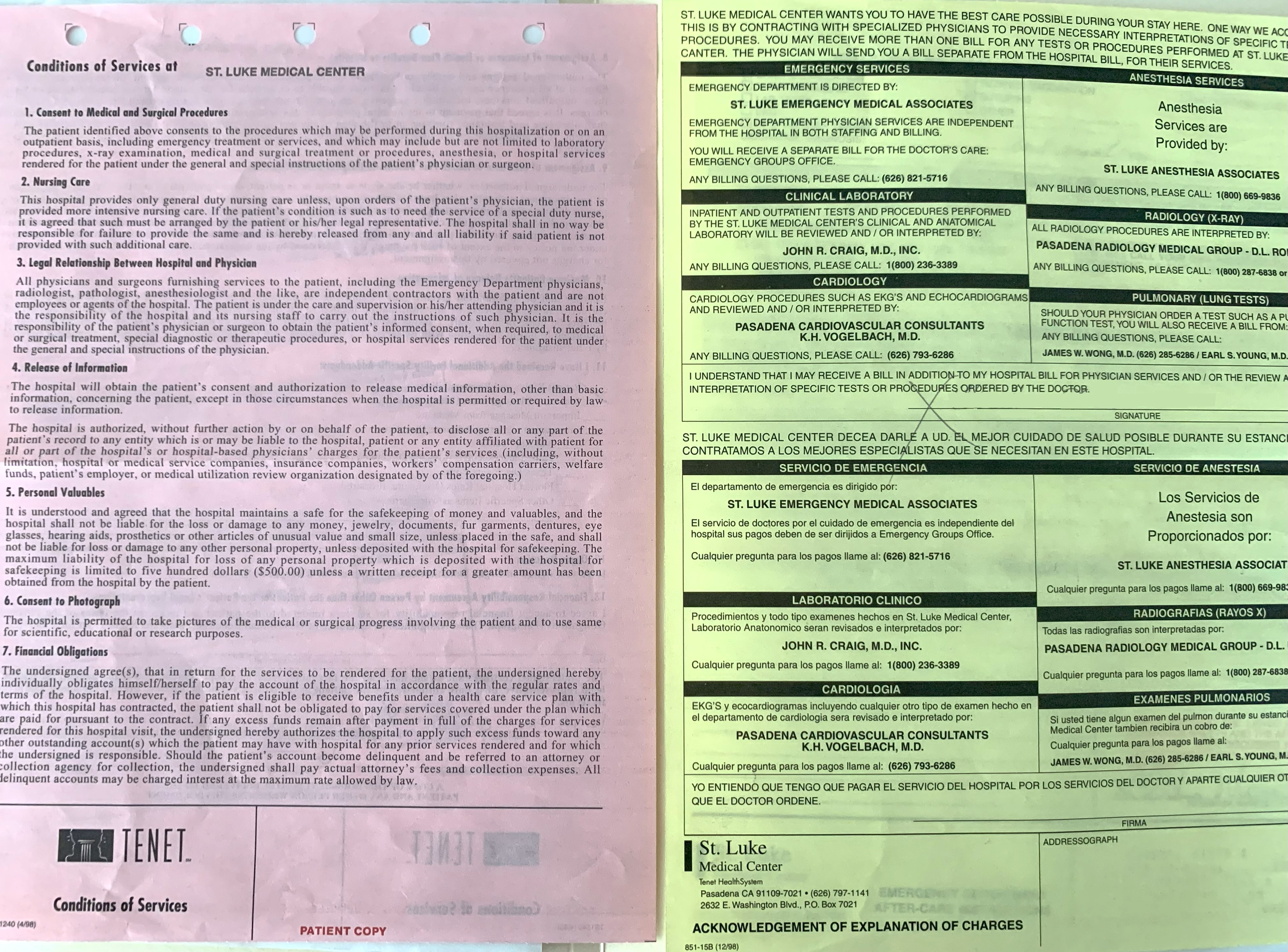
Patient Records from St Luke c. 2000

Through much of the late 1990s, Tenet was negatively criticized on numerous occasions for their management of the St Luke as patients and local residents noted the declining service within the hospital despite the then-recent renovations. Tenet Healthcare's then-CEO Jeffrey Barbakow also received much scrutiny for his financial practices, as the network was regularly criticized for their poor management and closures of numerous hospitals across the network in an effort to appease Tenet's shareholders. Further adding to St Luke's decline, Huntington Hospital completed multiple expansive renovations in 1998, drawing more patients away from the area and seeing more of St. Luke's personnel transfer out of the aging hospital.

On January 5, 2002, Tenet Healthcare announced they would permanently close the facility by the end of the month, citing the hospital's inability to reach fiscal goals for the company dating back to 2000. Jeffrey Barbakow and Tenet continued to receive criticism after relocating the company's corporate offices to Santa Barbara and later issuing him an undisclosed severance payout following his resignation later that year. The hospital closed permanently on January 25, 2002, with its emergency room closing two weeks later, on February 10, 2002.

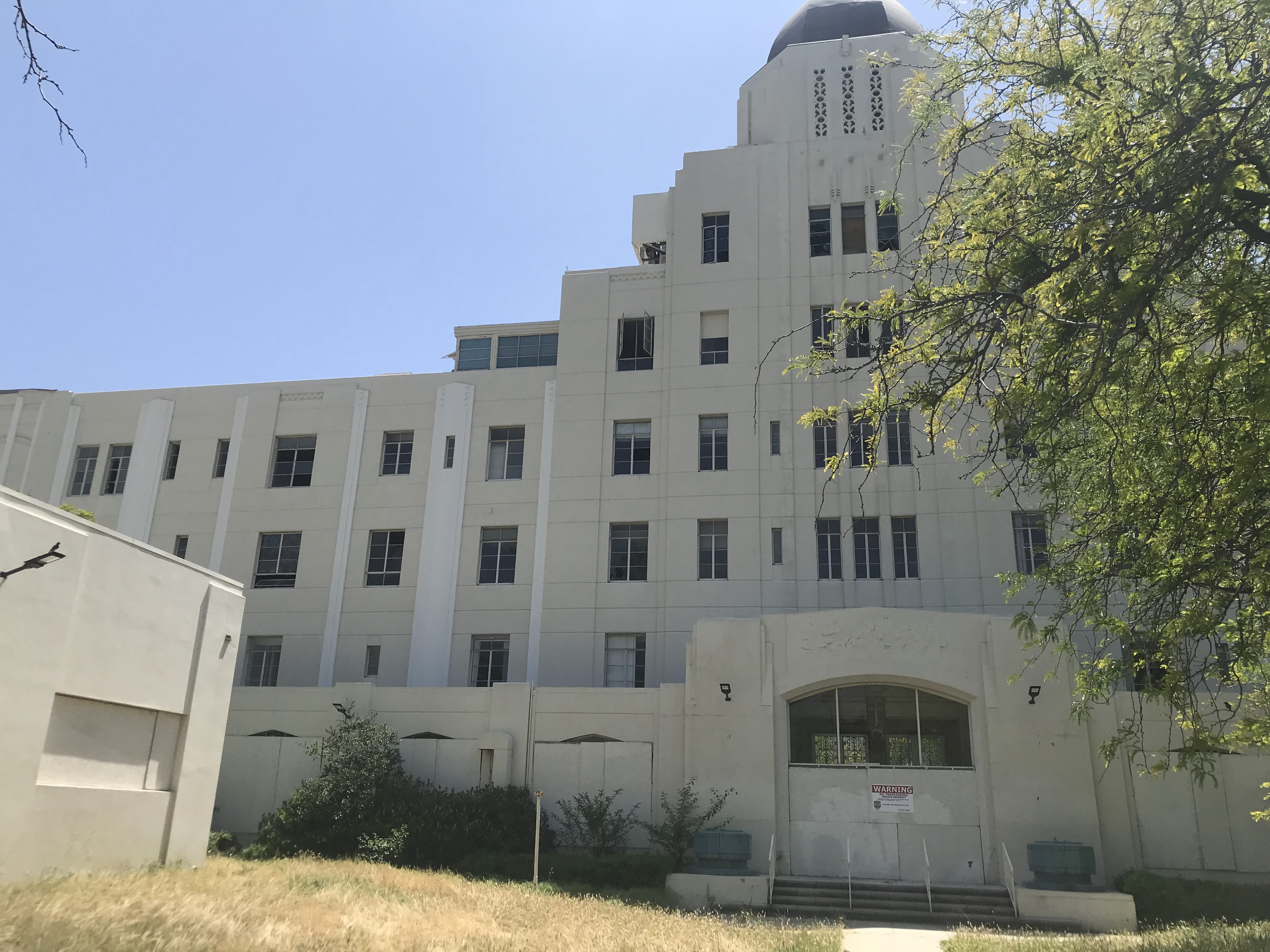
Front Facade of the hospital in 2022, Boarded over due to vandalism

=== Post-closure ===
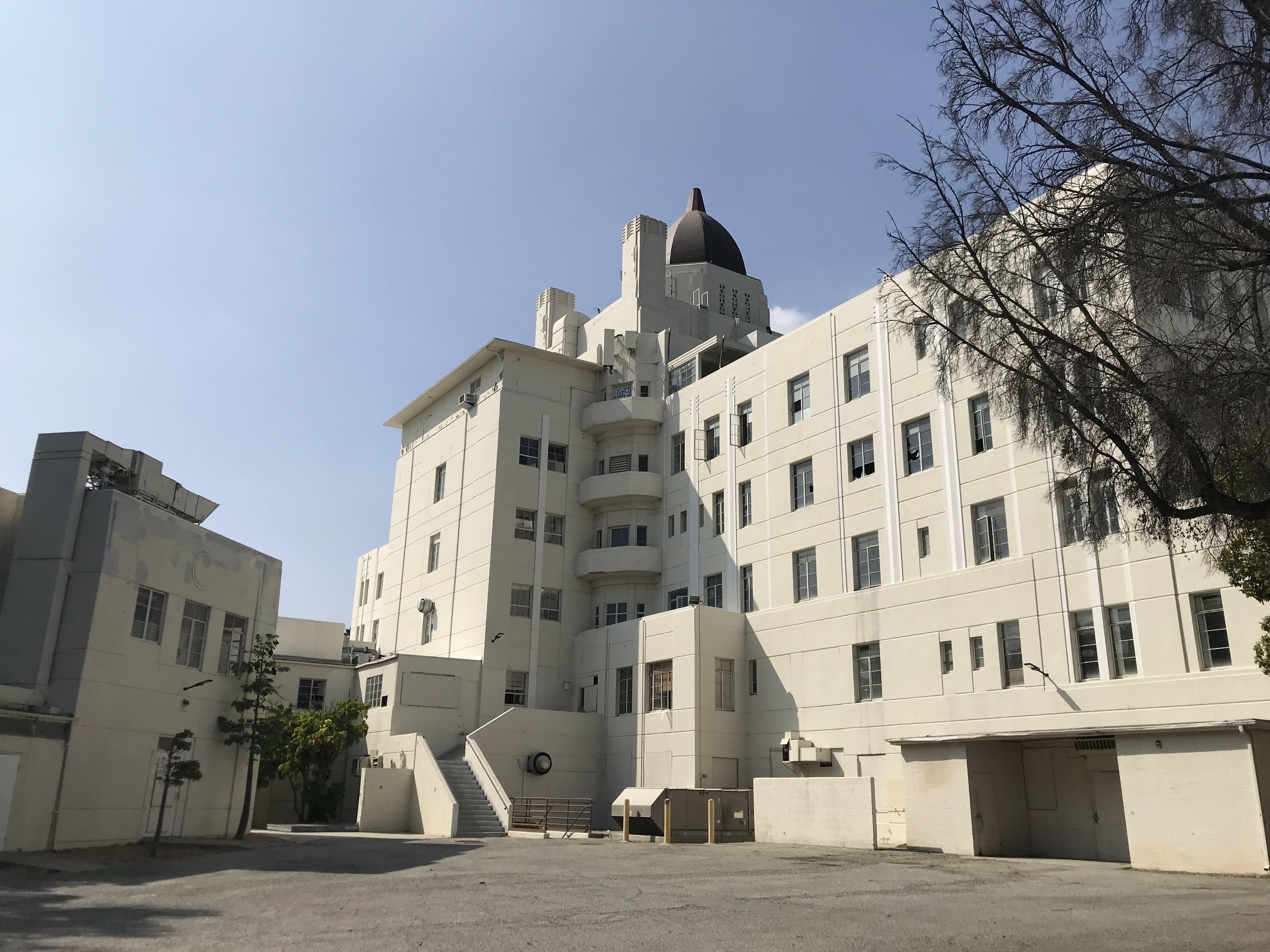
Former Patient Entrance c. 2022

In 2003, Tenet sold the property to Caltech for use as a research facility due to its location at the base of Eaton Canyon. Due to the original chapel's location on site and the original structure's age, the city of Pasadena filed the hospital as a historical landmark, preventing initial demolition plans scheduled for that year. However, the university saw very little of use in the aging facility and sold the property in 2007 to Denley Investments; a Beverly Hills based real estate company.

For several years following its closure, the property became a prominent film location due to its low cost and size, prominently featuring in such movies as Kill Bill: Volume 1 and La La Land. In 2013 the hospital was briefly evaluated by the city of Pasadena for possible reuse as an urgent care facility; however, the proposal was quickly vetoed as the location was deemed too outdated to meet current state standards.

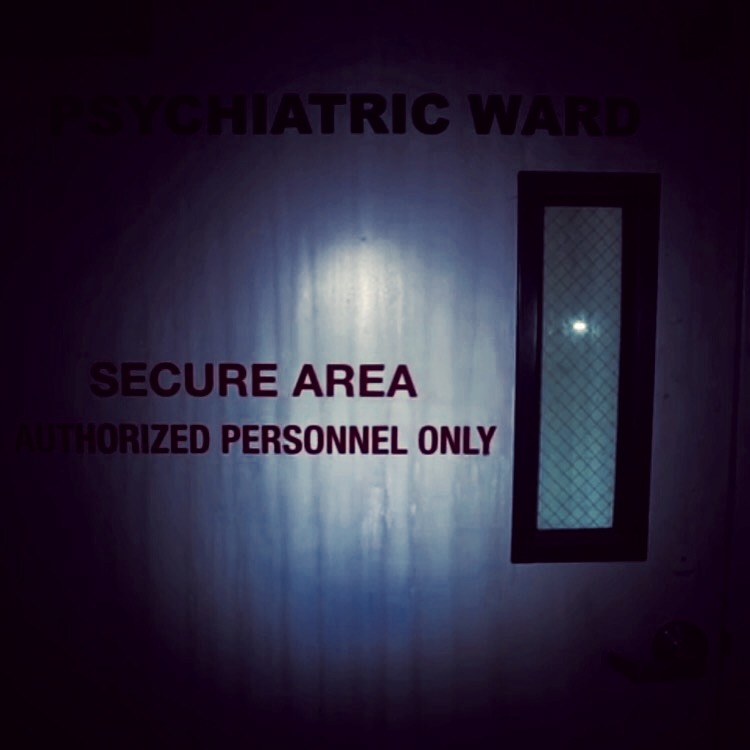
The Entrance to the Psychiatric Ward at St Luke's Hospital

Following the initial closure in 2002, and the sale from Caltech in 2007, the hospital was left with a large amount of remaining medical equipment and beds. At some point around 2011, Denley covered nearly all of Tenet's signage around the property. In 2012, Denley Investments used the property to install a cell tower on the back of the hospital's copper dome in a contractual lease with T-Mobile. The hospital's southern parking lot would also be briefly leased out to a charter bus company for parking. The hospital would continue to fall victim to vandalism, scrapping, and neglect during the late 2010s, as Denley had minimized expenses on security up to that point.

Mehdi Bolour, CEO of Denley Investments, was arrested on September 13, 2018, after investigators had discovered he was involved in operations illegally renting apartments across Los Angeles county. Bolour's offices had previously been raided by Los Angeles police in May 2018, after it was discovered his associates had been smuggling illegal drugs and firearms to numerous properties owned by Denley. Los Angeles City Councilmember Mitch O'Farrell later criticized Bolour, exclaiming; "He is the stereotypical slumlord, and we're going after him, it's that simple".

=== Today ===
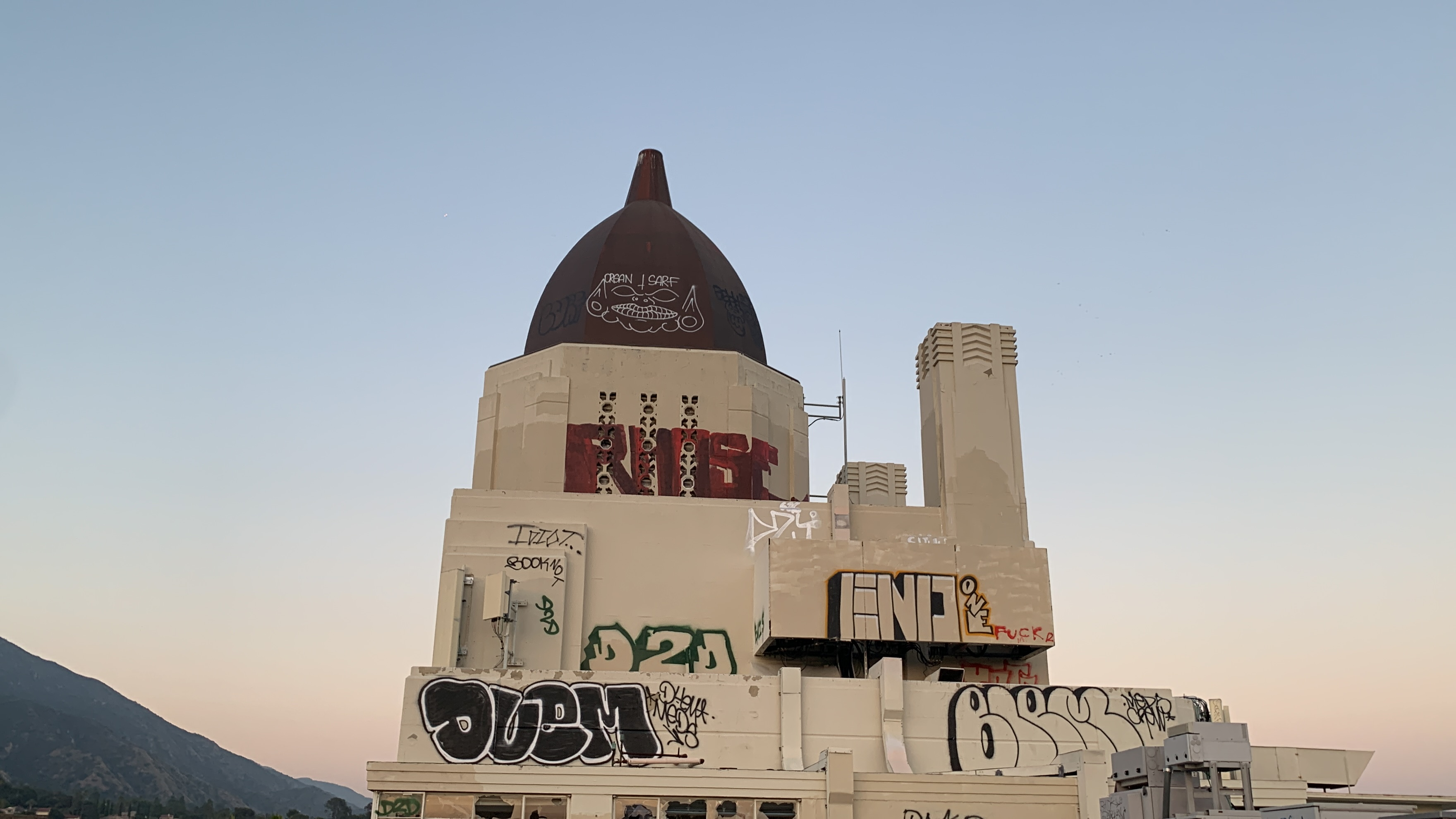
The copper Dome covered in graffiti by taggers c. June 2023

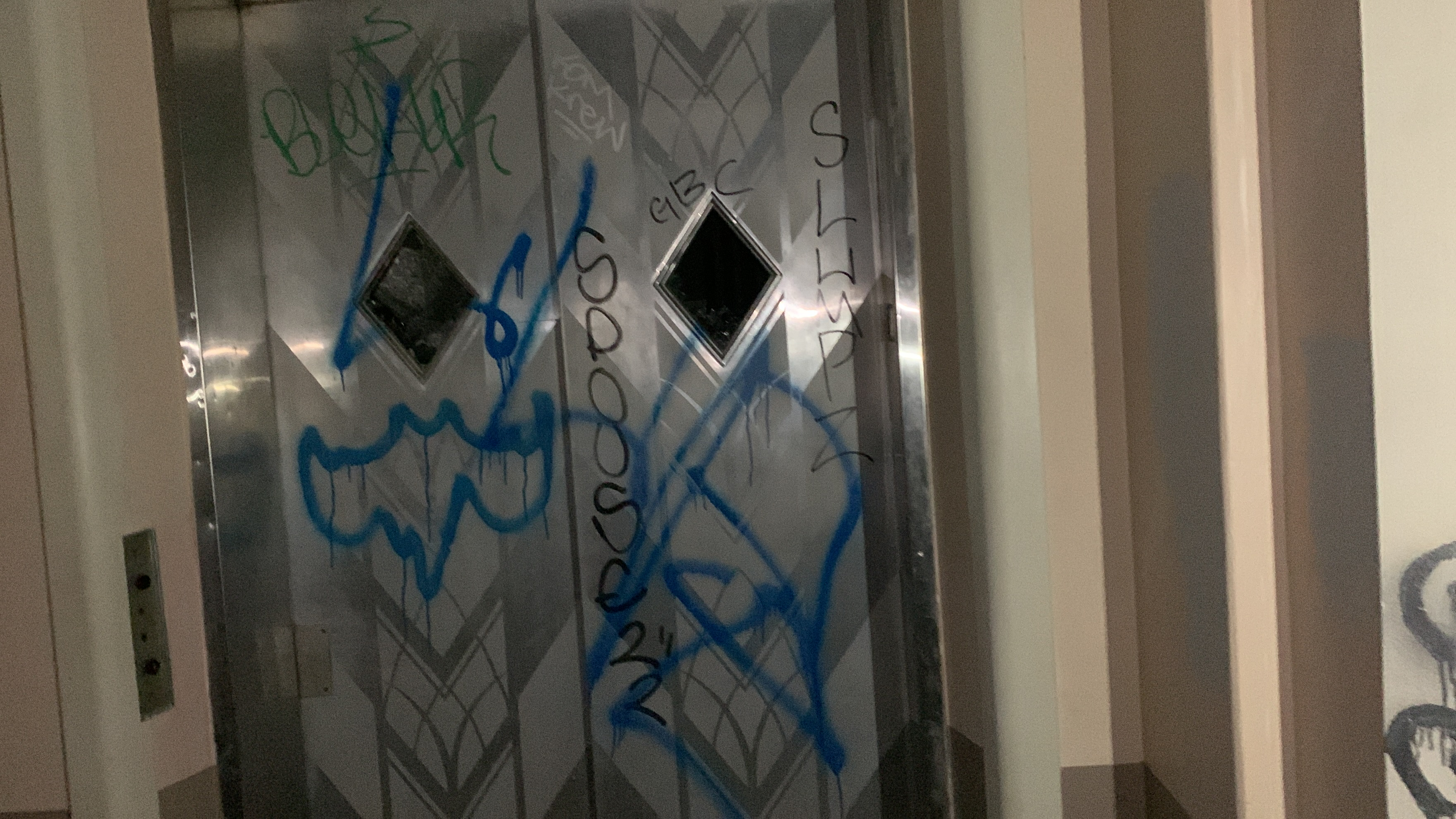
The main elevator, covered in graffiti

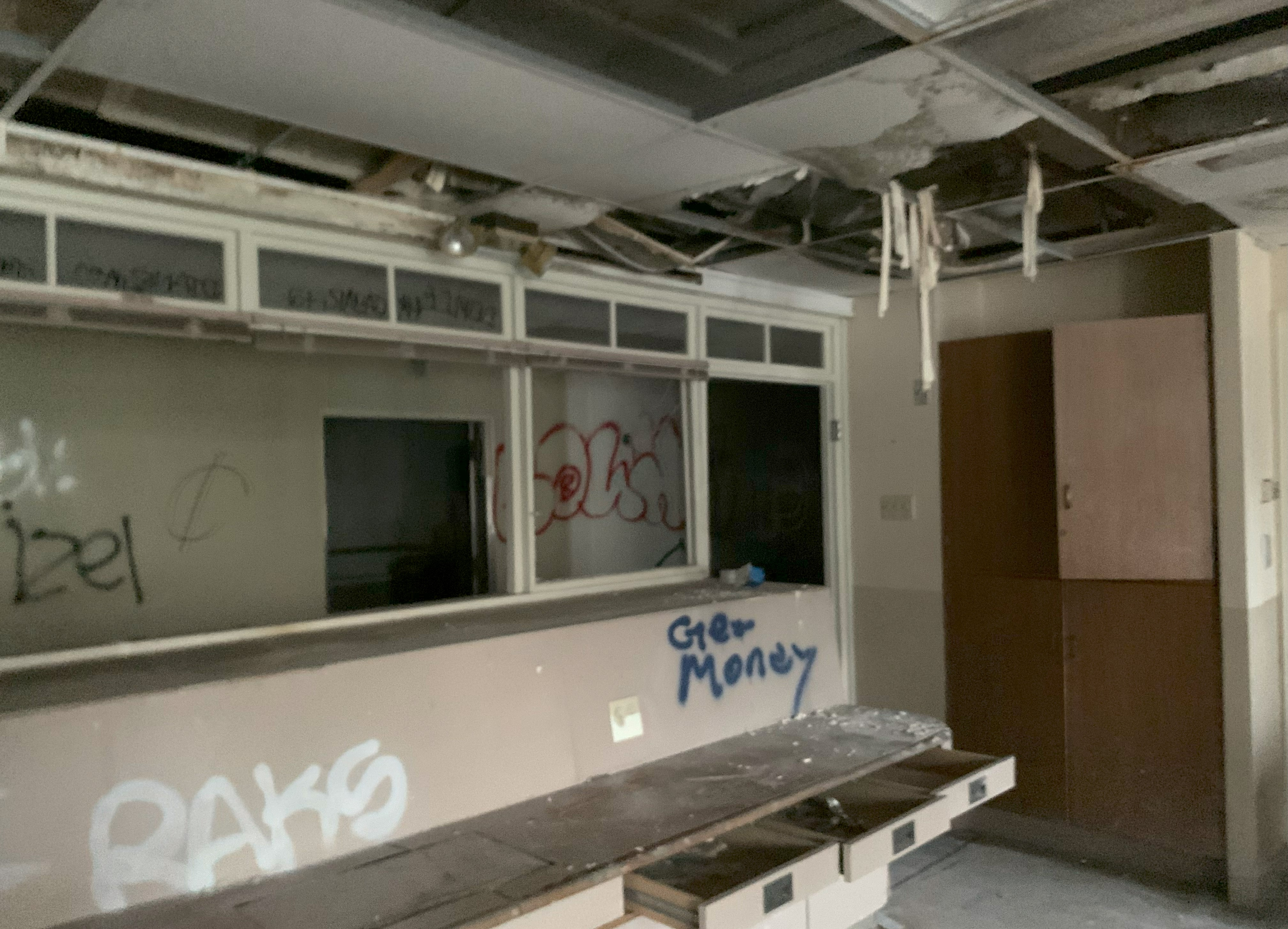
A former Nurse station c. 2023

In 2019; Bolour ordered for most of the lower-level windows to be boarded over, and installed security lights to repel vandals and the homeless population. The city of Pasadena once again examined the property in March 2020 for possible reuse during the COVID-19 pandemic, but plans were thwarted as city contractors noted that the building's plumbing and electrical wiring were damaged by vandals. In April 2023; vandalism had further accelerated across the building; as vandals had begun scrapping copper wiring, tagging much of the exterior, and shattering numerous windows around the property.

Mehdi Bolour claimed to have filed for a $7 million insurance payout in an effort to repair the damage to the property, though little action has since been taken. Since Bolour's statement; vandals have regularly broken into the property, with graffiti beginning to cover much of the exterior and the copper dome. In July 2023, Bolour began delegating cleanup of the property to his associates pending his insurance payout. Pasadena Police have also begun a regular sweep of the property on a weekly basis to repel further vandals and scrappers. As of September 2023; the hospital property has been further fortified with a large perimeter fence and is equipped with motion detectors. Facing pressure from Pasadena city council, most of the external graffiti has been painted over and lower level entrances have been barricaded with steel plates.

On January 8, 2025; the hospital was damaged by the severe Eaton Fire part of the January 2025 Southern California wildfires, though the main building was relatively unharmed, multiple surrounding buildings both on, and adjacent to the complex were destroyed by the fire.

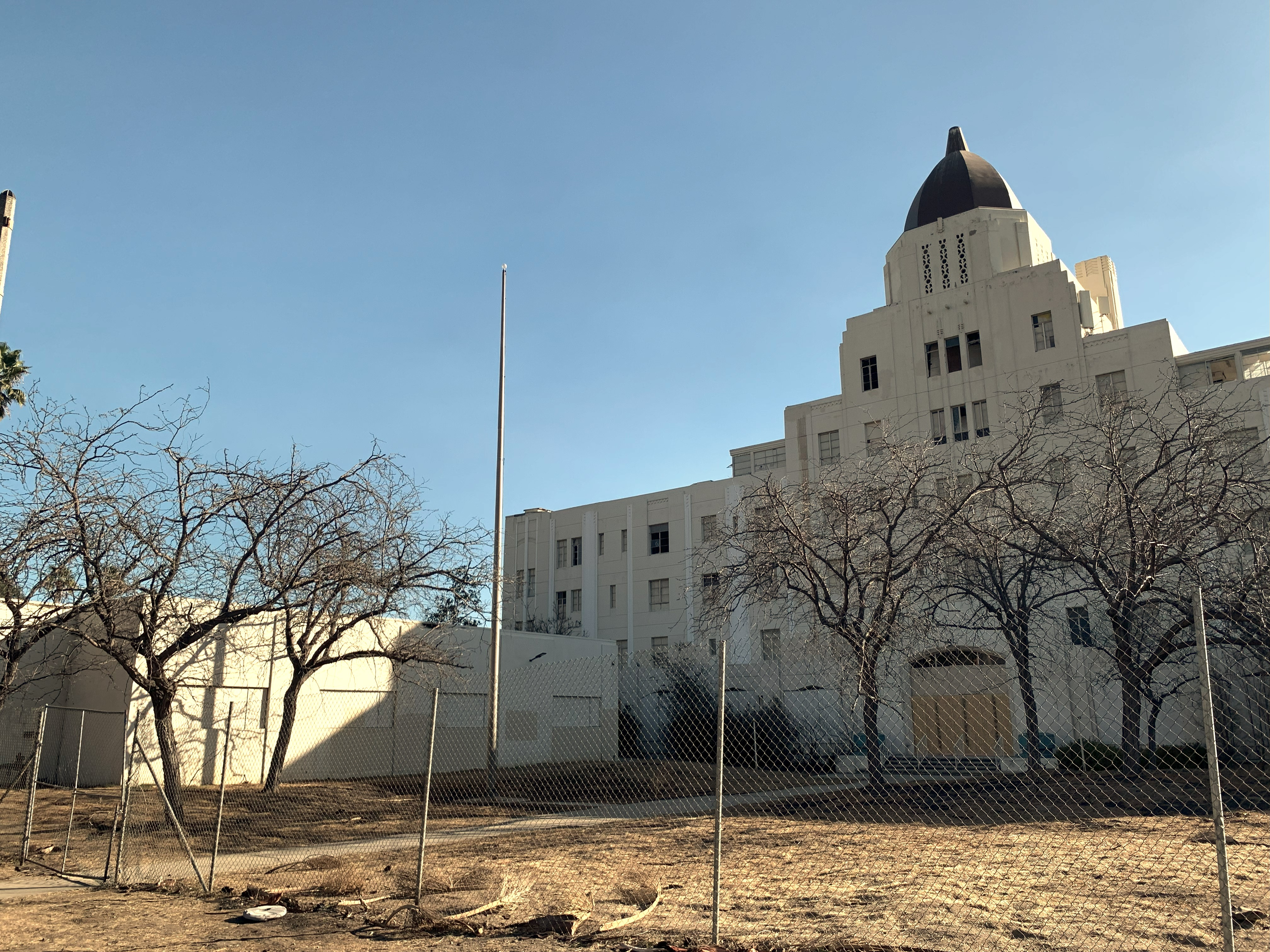
The exterior of the hospital shortly after the Eaton Fire, c. January 2025

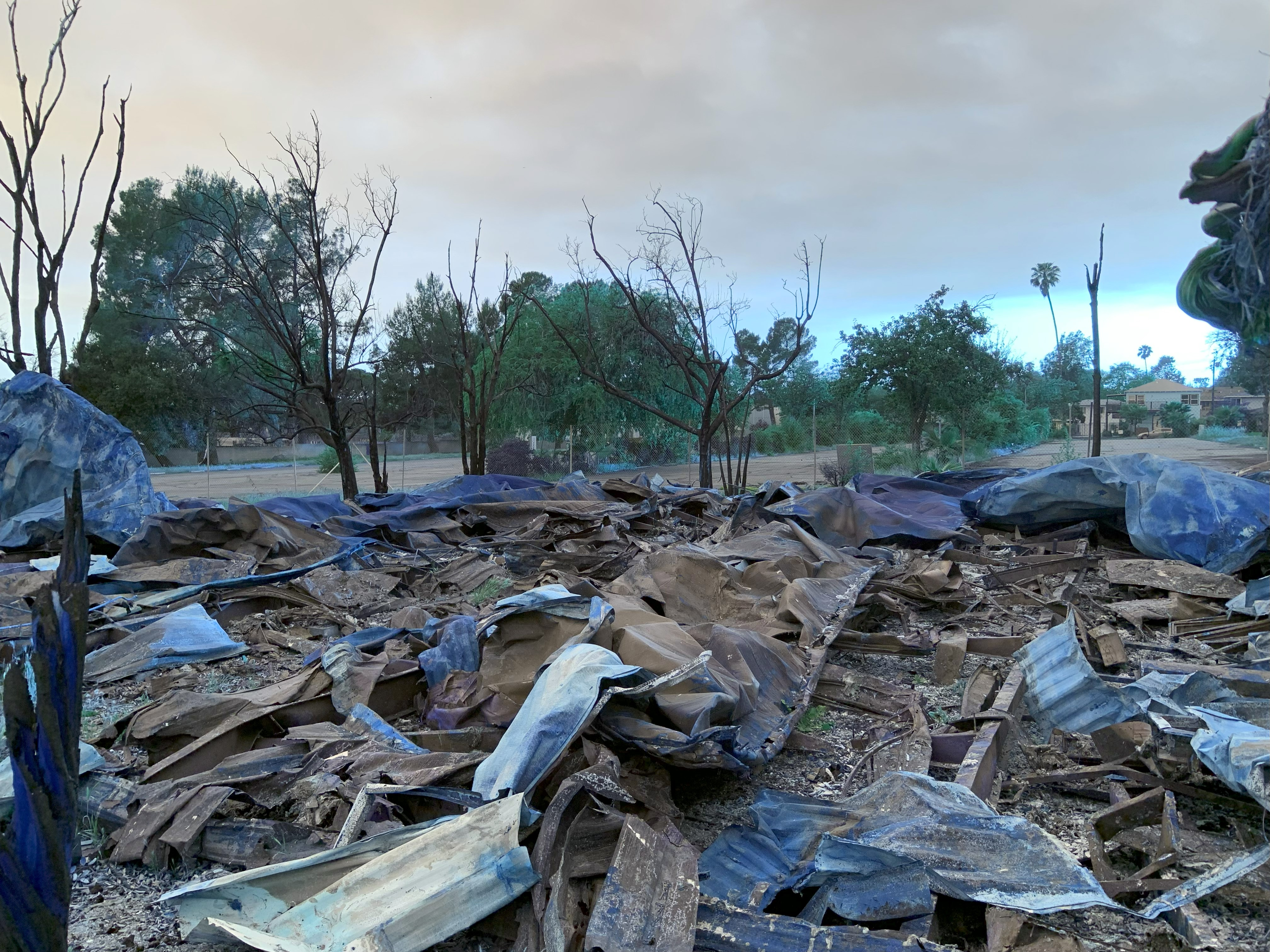
Exterior Buildings destroyed by the fires, 4 months later

== As a filming location ==
Notable works shot at St. Luke include the following:

Films

- Equinox (1970)
- Halloween II (1981)
- Kill Bill: Volume 1 (2003)
- Dead End (2003)
- Starsky & Hutch (2004)
- Step Brothers (2008)
- Catatonic (2015)
- La La Land (2016)

Television programs

- No Greater Love (1986)
- MacGyver (2016–21)
- Scream Queens (2015-2016) (second season)
- Grey's Anatomy (2005 TV series) (16th season)

Music videos

- One Finger and a Fist - Drowning Pool (2013)
- Run - Foo Fighters (2017)

== See also ==
- Linda Vista Community Hospital
- Robert F. Kennedy Medical Center
- LAC+USC Medical Center
- Huntington Hospital
- Lindy Boggs Medical Center
