= Outpatient surgery =

Surgery that does not require an overnight hospital stay

Outpatient surgery, also known as ambulatory surgery, day surgery, day case surgery, or same-day surgery, is surgery that does not require an overnight hospital stay. (Note: The International Association for Ambulatory Surgery (IAAS) would not consider all of these terms synonymous. In a 2003 document "Ambulatory (day) surgery: suggested international terminology and definitions", the IAAS recommends defining an "outpatient" procedure as one "carried out in the outpatient department of a hospital" and an "ambulatory" procedure as one "excluding an office/surgery or outpatient operation/procedure, where the patient is discharged on the same working day." That is, "ambulatory surgery" occurs in an "ambulatory surgery center.") The term “outpatient” arises from the fact that surgery patients may enter and leave the facility on the same day. The advantages of outpatient surgery over inpatient surgery include greater convenience and reduced costs.

Outpatient surgery may occur in an inpatient facility, in a self-contained unit within a hospital (also known as a hospital outpatient department), in a freestanding self-contained unit (also known as an ambulatory surgery center), or in a physician's office-based unit. Between the late 20th century and early 21st century, outpatient surgery has grown in popularity in many countries. In the United States, 65% of surgeries at hospitals in 2012 were conducted on an outpatient basis, compared with 54% in 1992.

Studies have shown that outpatient surgery is as safe as or safer than inpatient surgery. For instance, complication rates and post-surgical hospitalization or readmission rates are comparable, and pain and infection rates are lower after outpatient surgery than inpatient surgery. Nevertheless, articles in the newsmedia (such as some discussing the 2014 death of Joan Rivers after an outpatient procedure) have questioned the safety of outpatient surgery performed at ambulatory surgery centers.

== Ambulatory surgery centers ==
Ambulatory surgery centers, also known as outpatient surgery centers, same day surgery centers, or surgicenters, are health care facilities where surgical procedures not requiring an overnight hospital stay are performed. Such surgery is commonly less complicated than that requiring hospitalization. Avoiding hospitalization can result in cost savings to the party responsible for paying for the patient's health care.

These centers specialize in providing surgery, including certain pain management and diagnostic (e.g., eye muscle surgery services) in an outpatient setting. Overall, the services provided can be generally called procedures. These can be considered procedures that are more intensive than those done in the average doctor's office but not so intensive as to require a hospital stay. An ambulatory surgery center and a specialty hospital often provide similar facilities and support similar types of procedures. The specialty hospital may provide the same procedures or slightly more complex ones and the specialty hospital will often allow an overnight stay. ASCs do not routinely provide emergency services to patients who have not been admitted to the ASC for another procedure.

=== Procedures ===
As of 2011, physicians performed more than 23 million procedures per year in over 5,300 ASCs in the United States.

In the 1980s and 1990s, many procedures that used to be performed exclusively in hospitals began taking place in ASCs as well. Many knee, shoulder, eye, spine and other surgeries are currently performed in ASCs. As of 2016, of procedures in ASCs funded by Medicare in the United States, the three most common were cataract surgery with intraocular lens insert (18.7% of all procedures), upper gastrointestinal endoscopy with biopsy (8.2%), and colonoscopy with biopsy (6.8%).

=== History ===
The first center in the USA was established in Phoenix, Arizona in 1970 by two physicians who wanted to provide timely, convenient and comfortable surgical services to patients in their community, avoiding more impersonal venues like regular hospitals. Five surgeons performed cases at the center on the first day it opened, and four of those procedures required general anesthesia.

ASCs rarely have a single owner. Physicians partners who perform surgeries in the center will often own at least some part of the facility. Ownership percentages vary considerably, but most ASCs involve physician owners. Occasionally, an ASC is entirely physician-owned. However, it is most common for development/management companies to own a percentage of the center.

Some large healthcare companies own many types of medical facilities, including ambulatory surgery centers. The largest ASC chains in terms of numbers of centers include Envision Healthcare, Tenet Healthcare/United Surgical Partners International, Surgical Care Affiliates, Hospital Corporation of America, Ambulatory Surgical Centers of America, and Surgery Partners and Physicians Endoscopy. Nearly 68 percent of ASC management companies reported having equity ownership in all freestanding entities they managed.

ASCs are in all 50 states and can be found throughout the world. In the US, most ASCs are licensed, certified by Medicare and accredited by one of the major health care accrediting organizations. California is the leading US state in the number of Medicare Certified ASCs, followed by Florida, and then Texas. California has 694 ASCs. It is followed by Florida with 387 ASCs and then Texas with 347 ASCs. With only 1 Medicare Certified ASC, Vermont is at the bottom of the list.

Although complications are very rare, ASCs are required by Medicare and the accreditation organizations to have a backup plan for transfer of patients to a hospital if the need arises.

The national nonprofit organizations that represents the interests of ASCs and their patients is Ambulatory Surgery Center Association (ASC Association), which was formed in 2008 when the Federated Ambulatory Surgery Association (FASA) and the American Association of Ambulatory Surgery Centers (AAASC) merged. William Prentice is the executive director of ASCA. He previously served as the director of the Washington office for the American Dental Association.

=== Accreditation ===
Accreditation organizations for ASCs provide standards of medical care, record keeping, and auditing. Some of the goals of these organizations include continuous improvement of medical care in surgery centers and providing an external organization where the public can get information on many aspects of ASCs. These accreditation organizations require members to receive periodic audits. These audits will come every one to three years, depending on the accreditation organization and the circumstances of the surgery center. In an audit, a team of auditors visits the facility and examines the ASC's medical records, written policies, and compliance with industry standards.

Effective in 1996, California was the first state in the United States to require accreditation for all outpatient surgery settings that administer anesthesia. The Centers for Medicare and Medicaid Services have approved five organizations to accredit ASCs: Accreditation Association for Ambulatory Health Care (AAAHC), American Association for Accreditation of Ambulatory Surgery Facilities (AAAASF), Healthcare Facilities Accreditation Program (HFAP), Institute for Medical Quality (IMQ), and The Joint Commission (TJC).

== See also ==
- National Association for Ambulatory Urgent Care
