= Andrew Rakich =

American YouTuber and filmmaker (b. 1991)

- Education: University of North Carolina School of the Arts

YouTube information
- Channel: AtunSheiFilms
- Years active: 2016–present
- Genres: history; film
- Subscribers: 560 thousand
- Views: 99 million
- Last updated: October 27, 2026
- Website: Official website

Andrew Rakich is an American YouTuber and filmmaker known for creating and hosting the educational YouTube channel Atun-Shei Films, which specializes in producing videos about the history of the United States. He has also directed two horror feature films, The Sudbury Devil and The Vampires of New Orleans.

Among his most popular works on YouTube is the ten-part series "Checkmate, Lincolnites!" (2019-2024), in which he debunks common Lost Cause myths about the Confederacy that originated following the American Civil War. In 2023 Rakich made his directorial debut with the supernatural horror film The Sudbury Devil about a pair of Puritan witch hunters investigating rumors of devil worship in 17th century New England; the film was praised by Giallo Julian of Dread Central, who described it as "beautifully shot, well-performed, suitably eerie, and appropriately grotesque."

His sophomore feature, a docudrama entitled The Vampires of New Orleans, was released in October 2026. A longtime resident of the city, Rakich described his approach to the film in an interview with Geese as "working through my very complicated feelings about New Orleans. The movie is a question: what is the soul of New Orleans? Is this city a dream or a nightmare? Is this movie a love letter to the city or is it a suicide note?"

Rakich practices veganism and has canvassed for the animal rights group Pro-Animal Future.
