= Tenet Healthcare =

American healthcare company

Coordinates: 32.947670°N 96.823285°W

Tenet Healthcare Corporation
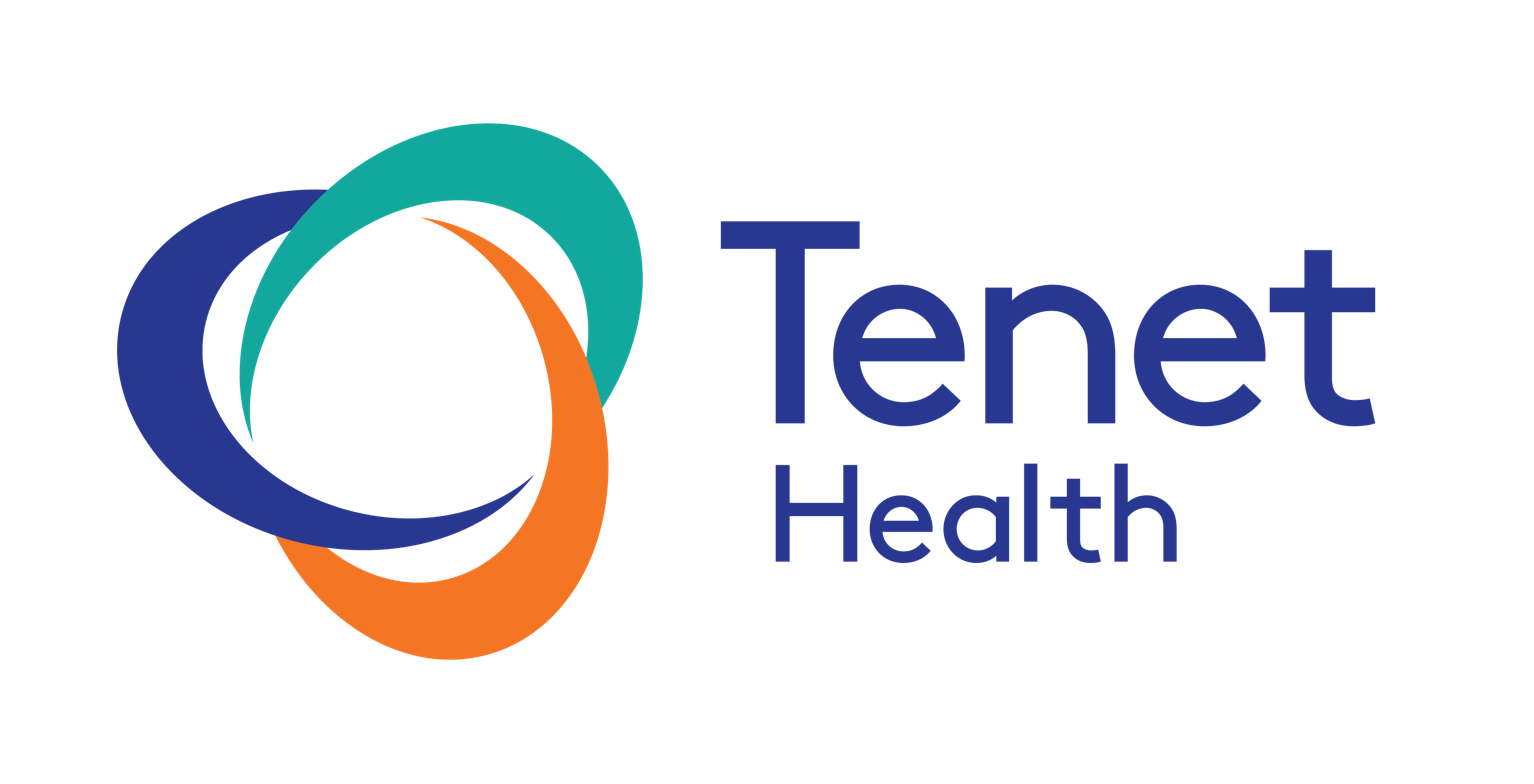
- Type: Public
- Traded as: NYSE: THC; S&P 400 component
- Industry: Healthcare
- Predecessors: American Medical Holdings; National Medical Enterprises
- Founded: 1969; 57 years ago
- Headquarters: Dallas, Texas, U.S.
- Key people: Saum Sutaria (chairman and CEO)
- Services: Healthcare services
- Revenue: ▲US$20.7 billion (2024)
- Operating income: ▲US$5.96 billion (2024)
- Net income: ▲US$3.20 billion (2024)
- Total assets: ▲US$28.9 billion (2024)
- Total equity: ▲US$4.17 billion (2024)
- Number of employees: 98,000 (2024)
- Subsidiaries: United Surgical Partners International; Conifer Health Solutions
- Website: tenethealth.com

Tenet Healthcare Corporation is an American for-profit multinational healthcare services company based in Dallas. Through its brands, subsidiaries, joint ventures, and partnerships including United Surgical Partners International (USPI), the company operates around 65 hospitals and over 450 healthcare facilities. Tenet also runs Conifer Health Solutions, which provides healthcare support services to health systems and other clients.

Since its founding in 1969, Tenet has expanded significantly. Among other major acquisitions and formations, Tenet founded Conifer Health Solutions in 2008, MedPost Urgent Care in 2014, and in 2013 acquired Vanguard Health Systems, Inc., an investor-owned hospital company whose operations complemented Tenet's existing business. The acquisition created the third-largest investor-owned hospital company in the United States in terms of revenue and the third-largest in number of hospitals owned. In 2015, Tenet acquired USPI, which created the largest operator of outpatient surgery centers in the U.S. In 2021, the company ranked 167th in the Fortune 500.

The company has settled a number of multimillion-dollar settlements related to defrauding Medicare, Medicaid, and patients. That includes admitting psychiatric patients who did not need hospitalization and then charging these patients inflated prices.

== History ==
=== 1969–1999 ===
Tenet was first incorporated in 1969 by attorneys Richard Eamer, Leonard Cohen, and John Bedrosian, as National Medical Enterprises, (NME) and headquartered in Los Angeles. By 1975, NME owned, operated, and managed 23 hospitals and a home health care business. By 1981, NME owned or managed 193 hospitals and nursing homes, and became the third-largest healthcare company in the U.S. In the mid-1980s, NME shifted its focus to specialty hospitals. By 1990, the company had 200 hospitals in its network and was the second-largest hospital company in the U.S.

After some scandals in the early 1990s (see below), NME divested its specialty facilities. Tenet possessed a dominant market share in Southern California at the time and envisaged the same prospects in South Florida, Louisiana, Texas, and the Philadelphia area. In 1994, NME bought American Medical Holdings for $3.35 billion, which strengthened its presence in Southern California and South Florida, and extended its operations into New Orleans, Louisiana, and Texas. After completing the acquisition, NME changed its name to Tenet Healthcare Corporation. In 1996, Tenet CEO Jeffrey Barbakow moved Tenet's headquarters from Santa Monica, California to Santa Barbara. Also in 1996, Tenet acquired OrNda, then the third-largest investor-owned hospital chain. In 1998, Tenet purchased eight Philadelphia hospitals owned by the bankrupt Allegheny Health, Education & Research Foundation for $345 million.

=== 2000–2013 ===
In 2002, one of Tenet's hospitals came under scrutiny for its surgical practices and another was investigated in a kickback scheme. Federal investigations into the company's billing practices, particularly those related to Medicare, began late in 2002, leading to a decline in Tenet's stock price of about 70%. In 2003, Trevor Fetter became the CEO of Tenet and started Commitment to Quality, an initiative to improve the "quality, safety, service and outcomes of the care and services" provided by the company. Rebuilding its ethics and compliance programs, Tenet hired a chief compliance officer to report directly to the company's board of directors. In 2003, Tenet sold or closed 14 hospitals and closed more than 20 facilities in 2004 to achieve its financial performance goals. Also in 2004, Tenet moved its headquarters from Santa Barbara to Dallas. In 2006, Tenet agreed to pay $725 million to the Justice Department to settle allegations of unusually high Medicare payments to Tenet hospitals in 2000 to 2002. The company entered into a five-year corporate integrity agreement with the U.S. Department of Health and Human Services which required them to provide detailed financial reports on its patient mix, collection rates and accounts receivables. In 2007, Tenet appointed former Florida governor Jeb Bush to its board of directors to improve its reputation.

In 2008, Tenet launched Conifer Health Solutions, a healthcare services company. As of 2018, Conifer served approximately 800 clients in the U.S. and processed $30 billion in net revenue annually. In early 2009, the price of Tenet stock briefly dipped below $4 per share after cresting above $200 per share in 2002. By the end of 2009, the company rebounded to become the S&P 500's number 2 performer, with an operating revenue and net profit of $9 billion and $181 million, respectively. On July 24, 2019, Tenet announced it intended to spin off Conifer Health Solutions into an independent publicly traded company.

In May 2011, Tenet's board rejected a $7.3 billion takeover bid from Community Health Systems, in a deal which would have created the largest hospital company in the United States. In April 2012, Tenet agreed to pay $42.75 million to resolve allegations that it improperly billed Medicare between 2005 and 2007. An internal investigation by Tenet revealed Medicare billing irregularities, and the company reported itself to the U.S. government. In May 2012, Tenet sold Diagnostic Imaging Services, Inc., its former diagnostic imaging center business in Louisiana. In August 2012, Tenet sold its Creighton University Medical Center in Omaha, Nebraska. In 2013, Tenet acquired Vanguard Health Systems, based in Nashville in a deal worth $4.3 billion. Through its acquisition of Vanguard, Tenet acquired 28 hospitals and 39 outpatient centers that served communities in Arizona, California, Illinois, Massachusetts, Michigan and Texas. The acquisition created the third-largest for-profit hospital chain in the U.S. in terms of revenue and the third-largest in number of hospitals owned. Through the end of 2013, Tenet's stock price increased 816 percent, from $4.60 to $42.12, over the previous five years.

=== 2014 ===
In 2014, Tenet ranked #229 in the annual Fortune 500 list of the largest American companies. In March 2014, Tenet formed a partnership with the Yale New Haven Health System to create a healthcare delivery network in Connecticut. Then in May 2014, Tenet announced plans to partner with the Texas Tech University Health Sciences Center in El Paso, Texas to develop a new 140-bed teaching hospital on the city's west side. Tenet launched MedPost Urgent Care in May 2014, which is a national network of urgent care centers. Previously, Tenet's urgent care locations often took on the names of nearby Tenet hospitals. At the time of the rebranding, MedPost had 23 facilities, with six in Texas, and others in Arizona, California, Florida, Georgia, Mississippi, Missouri, and Tennessee. In June 2014, Tenet acquired a majority interest in Texas Regional Medical Center, a 70-bed community hospital in Sunnyvale, Texas, east of Dallas. Also that month, Tenet opened Resolute Health Hospital in New Braunfels, Texas. The 128-bed hospital is located on a 56-acre "wellness" campus near San Antonio, Texas, and was Tenet's 79th hospital and 19th in Texas at the time.

In July 2014 Tenet announced that Saint Mary's Hospital in Waterbury, Connecticut would be acquired by a subsidiary of the company, with the hospital's religious directives and uncompensated care policies remaining intact. That continued a trend of Tenet allowing a model of common ownership, where each acquired hospital has its own agreement conditions. The deal, and three others Tenet had planned in the Connecticut, unraveled when Tenet expressed concern with the conditions on the sale set by the state. The Waterbury hospital was ultimately purchased by Trinity Health of Livonia, Michigan.

On August 1, 2014, Tenet acquired Emanuel Medical Center, a 209-bed hospital operated by the Swedish Evangelical Covenant Church located in Turlock, California, bringing the number of Tenet's hospitals at the time to 80 nationwide. Tenet announced in December 2014 that they had signed a letter of intent with the Baptist hospital system in Birmingham, Alabama to form a joint venture to own and operate the four Baptist hospitals plus Brookwood Medical Center, already owned by Tenet. Tenet would be the joint venture's majority owner.

As of the fourth quarter 2014, Tenet had turned a profit, explained by higher admissions and revenue (admissions through Medicaid increased by 20.5% after the Affordable Care Act). There was an increase in hospital admissions during the last quarter of 2014, while the company's bad debt expense ratio decreased. At the same time, its full year financial projections affirmed a price of $1.32 to $2.4 per share with revenue of $17.4 to $17.7 billion, with its earnings topping $1.95 billion. On May 7, 2015, the Tenet board of directors appointed Trevor Fetter, Tenet's then president and CEO, as chairman of the board. In 2015, the company moved from No. 229 to No. 170 on the Fortune 500.

=== 2015–2016 ===
In March 2015, Tenet announced an agreement to acquire a majority interest in United Surgical Partners International (USPI), which would make Tenet the largest operator of outpatient surgery centers in the United States. The June 2015 acquisition of USPI almost doubled Tenet's prior count of 210 outpatient centers. Tenet also announced an agreement to acquire Aspen Healthcare in Great Britain. On June 16, Tenet finalized their acquisition of Aspen Healthcare Ltd. and USPI. The USPI transaction raised the number of outpatient centers operated by Tenet to over 400, more than double what they had operated prior. It also again made Tenet a multinational company, as Tenet acquired nine British healthcare facilities. Bill Wilcox remained CEO of USPI, and Kyle Burtnett of Tenet joined USPI as chief integration officer, among other roles. Through the deal, USPI retained its independent branding.

Early in September 2015, Tenet acquired a majority interest in a three-hospital system in Tucson, Arizona, when Tenet, Dignity Health, and Ascension Health formed a joint venture to own and operate the Carondelet Health Network. The three hospitals' names remained unchanged, with close to 1,000 new beds added to the Tenet healthcare system as a result. The acquisition of Carondelet Health Network raised the total number of Tenet's general acute care hospitals to 83. On May 11, 2015, it was announced that the Tenet-operated Abrazo Health, acquired in 2013 as part of the Vanguard transaction, had been renamed Abrazo Community Health Network.

After first announcing the deal in March 2015, in January 2016 Tenet Healthcare closed a deal to form a joint venture with Baylor Scott & White Health, a non profit organizationwith plans for the joint venture to own and operate a number of hospitals in North Texas. The hospitals were all rebranded under the Baylor name over the coming months: Baylor Scott & White Medical Center — Centennial, Baylor Scott & White Medical Center – White Rock, Baylor Scott & White Medical Center – Lake Pointe, and Baylor Scott & White Medical Center – Sunnyvale.

On October 3, 2016, it was announced that Tenet had agreed to pay a $514 million settlement in an agreement with the Department of Justice. According to the lawsuit filed in 2014, four hospitals then owned by Tenet had collaborated in a "kickback" scheme with Clinica de la Mama to increase hospital referrals of Medicaid patients, with two of Tenet's former subsidiaries admitting to "conspiring to defraud Medicaid." According to Modern Healthcare, as part of the agreement, the "federal government acknowledged that individuals at the hospitals withheld information from Tenet about the agreements and circumvented Tenet's policies and procedures to prevent such illegal conduct."

In 2015, Tenet announced the acquisition of Baptist Health System of Birmingham, Alabama. Tenet's own Brookwood Medical Center in Birmingham would be included in the merger. The merger was finalized in 2016 and the new subsidiary was renamed Brookwood Baptist Health.

In September 2016, an agreement between Tenet and Humana Inc, a health insurance company based in Louisville, Kentucky came to an end, putting Tenet's facilities and physicians out-of-network for patients with Humana insurance, including those covered through commercial plans, Medicare Advantage, Healthcare Marketplace Exchange, Medicaid, and TRICARE. A new agreement was reached in May 2017 and hospital outpatient centers and physicians returned to Humana's network in June 2017.

=== 2017–present ===
Tenet Healthcare announced that the sale of three Houston hospitals and other facilities to HCA Healthcare was finalized in August 2017. The transaction was reported at $750 million in proceeds. In August 2017, Glenview Capital Management removed two of its representatives from the Tenet board over strategy disagreements with the board. In September 2017 there were "speculative" press reports that Tenet was considering "strategic options" such as a sale. In October 2017, the press reported that a sale was no longer being considered. Trevor Fetter stepped down as CEO in October 2017, and Ron Rittenmeyer was named CEO in addition to his position of executive chairman. Tenet increased its ownership in USPI to 95 percent in April 2018.

In August 2018, Tenet divested entirely from the United Kingdom. In the United States in 2018, Tenet Healthcare sold the for-profit MacNeal Hospital in Berwyn, Illinois, to the non-profit regional Roman Catholic Loyola Medicine. In January 2019, Tenet Healthcare sold its three remaining Chicago-area for-profit hospitals to Los Angeles-based Pipeline Health, which is partially owned and operated by Eric E. Whitaker. The three hospitals in the sale were Louis A. Weiss Memorial Hospital, Chicago; Westlake Hospital, Melrose Park, Illinois; and West Suburban Medical Center, Oak Park, Illinois. Then, in February 2019 Whitaker announced that Pipeline Health would close Westlake Hospital within five months, keeping the other two open.

During the COVID-19 pandemic, Tenet made nearly $399 million in profit. At the same time, the company furloughed 11,000 workers. J. Roger Davis was appointed president and CEO of Conifer in 2020. In December 2020, Tenet acquired the controlling interest in 45 ambulatory surgery centers from SurgCenter Development.

In April 2021, the company sold its urgent care service run by subsidiary United Surgical Partners International. That August, Tenet sold five of its Florida hospitals to Steward Health Care: Coral Gables Hospital in Coral Gables; Florida Medical Center, Lauderdale Lakes; Hialeah Hospital; North Shore Medical Center, Miami; and Palmetto General Hospital, Hialeah.

== Controversies ==
=== Psychiatric fraud ===
In the early 1990s as National Medical Enterprises, the company was accused of committing fraud by admitting thousands of psychiatric patients who did not need hospitalization and then charging them inflated prices. In 1991, the federal government investigated the company for fraud and conspiracy. In 1993, law enforcement raided company offices in an attempt to show that the company was defrauding patients and insurance companies. In 1994, the company paid total $2.5 million to settle lawsuits from 23 patients at its psychiatric hospitals. Again in 1994, National Medical Enterprises settled fraud charges with the U.S. and 28 states involving payments of a record $380 million at the time and federal guilty pleas on eight criminal counts by two of its units. The company also agreed to a five-year corporate integrity agreement with the U.S. Department of Health and Human Services.

=== Unnecessary heart surgeries ===
In the late 1990s through the early 2000s, Redding Medical Center (at the time, a Tenet-owned hospital), was investigated for performing unnecessary heart surgeries on over 600 patients. To settle the allegations, Tenet agreed to pay a $54 million fine to the federal government and the state of California, without admitting wrongdoing. This settlement did not preclude civil or criminal charges against individuals of the company. In order for the hospital to continue receiving Medicare reimbursements, Tenet was compelled by federal regulators to sell the hospital which was subsequently renamed Shasta Regional Medical Center. In 2004, Tenet paid an additional $395 million to 769 patients to settle litigation for the unnecessary surgeries. The scandal and subsequent federal investigation are described in the book Coronary: A True Story of Medicine Gone Awry by author Stephen Klaidman.

=== California Closures ===
In the mid-1990s, Tenet had a strategy of buying up community hospitals in Southern California in an effort to capitalize on rising insurance costs in the region. The company and former CEO Jeffrey Barbakow received scrutiny after Tenet began closing these community hospitals, inconsistently citing financial difficulties. The city of Pasadena, California, publicly attacked Tenet on numerous occasions after their buyout of the Oronda Health group in 1996. St. Luke Medical Center in Pasadena, at the time was one of only two general care community hospitals serving the city. Tenet was negatively criticized after numerous complaints accused the company of neglecting the facility after recent renovations. Tenet presented numerous inconsistencies in their quarterly reports as the company claimed that St. Luke was fiscally underperforming, leading Tenet to shutter the hospital in January 2002. Pasadena city officials expressed widespread anger at Barbakow and Tenet for the closure. Barbakow eventually received an undisclosed settlement and resigned from the company three months later.

=== Medicare fraud ===
In June 2006, Tenet agreed to pay $725 million in cash and give up $175 million of Medicare payments for a total of $900 million in fees to resolve claims it defrauded the federal government for overbilling Medicare claims during the 1990s. Financing the settlement, they sold 11 hospitals in four states, including Memorial Medical Center in New Orleans (see below). In September of 2006, Tenet entered into a five-year corporate integrity agreement with the U.S. Department of Health and Human Services. That agreement expired on September 27, 2011.

=== Bribery ===
In October 2016, Tenet Healthcare and two of its subsidiaries agreed to pay $513 million to resolve allegations that they had defrauded the United States and had made use of a kickback scheme to gain patient referrals. The two subsidiaries pleaded guilty to conspiracy to defraud the United States and to using kickbacks and bribes to refer primarily female undocumented Hispanic patients towards the labor and delivery services of Tenet Healthcare.

=== Hurricane Katrina ===
In August 2005, Tenet-owned Memorial Medical Center in New Orleans was struck by Hurricane Katrina. During and immediately following the storm, several hundred patients, visitors and staff sought medical care and shelter in the building. The hospital became surrounded by flood waters, which submersed the lower floors of the building, rendering the facility's emergency generators inoperable. Hospital staff were left to care for patients without electricity, sanitation, air conditioning, or adequate food and drinking water. The hospital was evacuated over the course of several days, during which time 45 patients died in the hospital building. It was alleged that staff intentionally hastened the death of several patients by administering lethal doses of sedatives and pain medication. In July 2006, Dr. Anna Pou and nurses Lori Budo and Cheri Landry were arrested after being charged by Louisiana Attorney General Charles Foti of second-degree murder in the deaths of four patients. In August 2007, a New Orleans grand jury declined to indict the three women and a New Orleans judge expunged their arrest records. In July 2007, Dr. Pou sued Foti for defamation and damage to her career. In June 2006, Tenet announced it planned to sell Memorial Medical Center and three other hospitals in the greater New Orleans area. In July 2009, Governor Bobby Jindal approved a bill passed by the Louisiana Legislature to reimburse Pou's legal fees, which were more than $450,000.

=== Florida pediatric heart surgery standards ===
In 2015, CNN reported that Tenet had lobbied the governor of Florida, Rick Scott, as well as Republican Party Florida legislators in order to remove hospital standard rules for pediatric heart surgeries after one of its hospitals failed to meet standards. Both the officials and Tenet denied any wrongdoing, with Tenet telling the press that "at no time have we discussed the pediatric cardiac standards with the governor or his office, or with any elected official or anyone on their staff... our opinion was not sought on the standards nor have we expressed a position on the possible repeal of the standards or the role of the Cardiac Technical Advisory Panel." Florida Health released a statement indicating that the legal basis for the removal of pediatric surgery standards had been revoked in 2001. The revocation invalidated the standards and it was an oversight that they were not formally stricken from record until 2015.

=== Children's Hospital of Michigan physician barring ===
In late 2019, the physician group, University Pediatricians announced that they were separating from the Wayne State University School of Medicine in Detroit and joining Central Michigan University in Mount Pleasant, Michigan instead. In retaliation, Wayne State announced that they were creating their own physician group, Wayne Pediatrics and gave doctors who taught medicine at the university 30 days to switch over their affiliation to Wayne Pediatrics or lose their access to the Children's Hospital of Michigan in Detroit. The group University Pediatricians has had an exclusive contract with the Detroit Medical Center and DMC's owner, Tenet Healthcare, decided that doctors from Wayne Pediatrics would lose their affiliation with the hospital and doctors with Wayne Pediatrics would not be able to treat or admit patients at the hospital. In April 2020 Wayne State officials announced that they were taking up legal action against Tenet Healthcare.

=== 2021 Saint Vincent Hospital strike ===
On March 8, 2021, workers at Saint Vincent Hospital in Worcester, Massachusetts, went on strike. According to the workers' union, the Massachusetts Nurses Association, the hospital, owned by Tenet Healthcare, has spent over $60,000,000 on the strike, hiring scab nurses to replace striking workers and paying the Worcester Police Department over $30,000 a day for overtime patrol of the picket line. A union spokesperson claimed that this amount was triple the cost of the nurses demands, but the hospital's president disputed the $60,000,000 number. In an interview with Jacobin, a magazine, the head of the Massachusetts Nurses Association alleged unsafe conditions at Saint Vincent Hospital, with a work overload of nurses resulting in inadequate care for patients. The union's head also said that with the onset of the COVID-19 pandemic, nurses faced an even higher workload and that Tenet received large amounts of money from the CARES Act while simultaneously furloughing nurses. Tenet made a contract offer in early July. Further negotiations ensued during July 22 and 23, with a subsequent two-day negotiation slated to begin August 2, 2021.

== Operations ==
Tenet Healthcare Corporation employed, in 2021, approximately 110,000 people. Through its brands, subsidiaries, joint ventures, and partnerships with companies like United Surgical Partners International (USPI), as of September 30, 2019, Tenet operated 65 hospitals and approximately 500 other healthcare facilities. Tenet subsidiaries own or lease and operate a number of medical office buildings, all located on or near Tenet hospital campuses. Tenet subsidiaries operate free-standing and provider-based outpatient centers, including diagnostic imaging centers, ambulatory surgery centers, off-campus emergency departments, and urgent care centers.

== Awards and recognition ==
Tenet Healthcare has received various honors for the company, including its operations and leadership. In 2013, the American Heart Association recognized Tenet as a "Platinum Fit-Friendly Company." Tenet's board of directors was named the Outstanding Board of Directors for a Public Company by the Dallas Business Journal in September 2014. Executive chair and CEO Ron Rittenmeyer has been named a "most admired CEO" by the Dallas Business Journal, and in 2019, Rittenmeyer was named fifty-ninth among the 100 Most Influential People in Healthcare by Modern Healthcare. In April 2021, the Tenet Board of Directors was again recognized by the Dallas Business Journal's Outstanding Directors Awards.

== Philanthropy ==
In 2002, the Tenet Healthcare Foundation awarded a $1 million grant to provide financial support to Latino nursing students. In 2004, THF, Tenet's charitable giving arm, awarded $2.78 million to support accelerated undergraduate and graduate nursing degree programs at five nursing colleges in Southern California, South Florida, Georgia and Texas. In 2012, Tenet joined GE and Verizon in supporting the launch of the Clinton Health Matters Initiative, created by the William J. Clinton Foundation to build on its work on global health and childhood obesity. In Tenet's "2013 Sustainability Report: Tenet Cares," the company stated that its support for local communities that year totaled $545 million in uncompensated care and $158 million in charity care. In 2014, Tenet Healthcare was a presenting sponsor of the third annual Clinton Foundation Health Matters Conference in La Quinta, California.

== See also ==
- Hospital Corporation of America
