= Ambulatory Surgery Center Association =

American nonprofit association

The Ambulatory Surgery Center Association is a nonprofit association in the United States. It represents all aspects of the Ambulatory Surgery Center industry including the physicians, nurses, administrative staff and owners.

The association represents the industry before the media, Congress, state legislatures and regulatory bodies, and advocates for quality standards, insurance coverage by Medicare and private payers, and reasonable conditions for coverage.

== History ==
The ASC Association was formed in 2008 when the two leading national ASC associations — FASA and the American Association of Ambulatory Surgery Centers (AAASC) — merged. The new organization commenced operations on January 1, 2008.

== Ambulatory Surgery Centers ==
Ambulatory Surgery Centers are medical facilities where surgery that does not require hospital admission are performed. The specific type and range of surgery performed by a particular facility varies. Some of the most common procedures are cataracts, colonoscopies, and arthroscopic surgery.

Patients who elect to have surgery in these types of facilities do so without being admitted to a hospital. They arrive on the day of the procedure, have the surgery in an operating room, and recover under the care of the nursing staff.
