= Carondelet Health Network =

Hospital networks in the United States

Carondelet Health Network is a large Catholic health care provider based in Tucson, Arizona. It has five facilities: Carondelet St. Mary's Hospital (the first hospital in Arizona), Carondelet St. Joseph's Hospital, Carondelet Neurological Institute, Carondelet Heart & Vascular Institute (all in Tucson), and Carondelet Holy Cross Hospital in Nogales, Arizona.

In 2015, owners Ascension Health sold a majority stake in Carondelet to Texas-based Tenet Healthcare, with Dignity Health also taking part ownership, turning it from a non-profit to a private profit making hospital chain.

== Services provided ==
Carondelet provides a wide range of health services at multiple locations. Only hospice and palliative care are described in the dated material below.

Carondelet Hospice and Palliative Care seeks to attend to the "physical, spiritual, and psychological needs of people living with a life-limiting illness", ensure that the physical and psychological needs of family members are met, and educate the public on the end-of-life process. Each patient is serviced based on individual needs and desires and a unique plan is created in order to best care for them.

Hospice and Palliative Care Services at one time included:

- Nursing visits
- Personal care
- Durable medical equipment and oxygen
- Medications and supplies
- Pain and symptom management
- Nutrition counseling
- Emotional support and counseling
- Spiritual support
- Bereavement follow-up
- Support groups
- Specialized therapies

== Nurse management study ==
Carondelet Health Network created a Community Nursing Organization (CNO) model, implemented in 1994, to determine if community-based health services could be efficiently managed by nurses. Key features of the Carondelet model included:

- Risk assessment of all members at enrollment and designated intervals
- Matching of nursing and clinical resources to member need and risk level
- Integration of primary, secondary and tertiary prevention services
- Participation of members in development and selection of educational programs and clinical interventions
- Individual and group interventions
- Community-based service delivery

Carondelet's CNO model included an analysis of the Southern Arizona health care market, in order to localize their nursing services.

The outcome of this study, or whether components of the model were adopted, is not known.

== Historical community support ==
In 2011, Carondelet hospice received a $4.5 million donation (equivalent to $6.29 million in 2024) from the estate of Winifred Q. Witt, a Tucson resident who, alongside her husband Samuel Witt, was known for her philanthropy in Southern Arizona. Executive director of Carondelet Hospice and Palliative Care Lupe Trieste said "With this gift, Carondelet will be able to ensure enduring, quality programs of support and comfort."

In 2002, all proceeds from the Nogales Debutante Cotillion were given directly to Carondelet Hospice. Cotillion Committee President Dora Dexter said that the committee chose Carondelet Hospice because "It’s a charitable cause that a lot of people overlook."

== Staffing Issues ==
The first nursing strike in Arizona took place at two Carondelet network Tucson hospitals in 2019, soon after the change in ownership, with workers in the National Nurses United asking for more resources for nursing staff "to bring staffing into alignment with what research shows is optimal for patient care.”

In January, 2022, nurses with National Nurses United protested outside Carondelet's St. Joseph's Hospital and St. Mary's Hospital protesting what they called unsafe and unsustainable conditions due mainly to staffing shortages. A St. Mary's Registered Nurse said "Our hospital is in crisis."
