= Louis A. Weiss Memorial Hospital =

Coordinates: 41°58′01″N 87°38′58″W

- Resilience Healthcare

Geography
- Location: Chicago, Illinois, United States

Organization
- Type: Teaching, for-profit

Services
- Beds: 236

History
- Founded: 1952 (opened in 1953)
- Closed: 2025

Links
- Website: www.weisshospital.com
- Lists: Hospitals in Illinois

Louis A. Weiss Memorial Hospital was a 236-bed hospital located in the Uptown neighborhood of Chicago, Illinois. It closed in November 2025.

== History ==
Weiss Memorial Hospital was located on the site of what used to be Clarendon Beach, a popular beach of the city. From 1980 to the early 2000s, Weiss Hospital was part of the University of Chicago Medical Center system.

Beginning in July 2012, Weiss Memorial Hospital joined the other four Tenet Healthcare hospitals in Chicago as an Accountable care organization, part of the Center for Medicare and Medicaid's Shared Savings Program.

In January 2019, Tenet Healthcare sold its three remaining Chicago-area for-profit hospitals to Los Angeles-based Pipeline Health, which is partially owned and operated by Dr. Eric E. Whitaker, a friend of former United States president Barack Obama. The three hospitals included in the sale were Louis A. Weiss Memorial Hospital, Chicago, Illinois; Westlake Hospital, Melrose Park, Illinois; and West Suburban Medical Center, Oak Park, Illinois.

In December 2022, Resilience Healthcare, with CEO Manoj Prasad, MD, bought West Suburban Medical Center and Weiss Memorial Hospital from Pipeline Health.

After a June 2025 closure due to failure of Weiss Hospital's air-conditioning system, US Centers for Medicare & Medicaid Services revoked Medicare reimbursement to Weiss Hospital starting August 8, 2025. A July 2025 investigation led the Department of Health and Human Services to conclude that the hospital was failing to comply with physical environment and emergency services standards. At least one journalist found Weiss to be completely closed on July 27, 2025, and barely open on July 31, 2025. Local politicians expressed concern.

The hospital ceased most of its operations on August 8, 2025, including closure of its emergency department and termination of inpatient services, but continued to offer select outpatient services. The hospital terminated all remaining outpatient services on November 26, 2025.

In October 2025, a Chicago Tribune investigation revealed that Resilience Healthcare owed the state more than $69 million in unpaid taxes and fees, including $27.7 million for Weiss hospital.

On September 9, 2026, officials at the Illinois Department of Public Health announced that Weiss Memorial Hospital lost its license after leadership failed to make improvements. Shortly thereafter, the Cook County Circuit Court resolved to appoint a receiver to take control of the hospital.

== Patient care and research ==
Early in the 21st century, various medical specialty services were provided through partnerships and contracts to achieve the best comprehensive care for patients at Weiss Memorial Hospital.

- The Chicago ENT specialty practice for ear, nose and throat included services for diagnostic, treatment and surgical intervention for ENT, as well as, allergy/immunology and audiology services.
- The Strauss Oncology Center at Weiss was a cancer research program that had an accreditation through the American College of Surgeons Commission on Cancer.
- The Chicago Center for Orthopedics (CCO) located at Weiss Memorial Hospital was the first hospital in Chicago to earn the Joint Commission's Gold Seal of Approval® for Joint Replacement-Hip and Joint Replacement–Knee. The center also earned the Blue Cross and Blue Shield's designation as a Blue Distinction Center® for knee and hip replacement and provided a wide variety of surgical and nonsurgical options to many orthopedic conditions.
- The Women's Health Center at Weiss Hospital had a team of physicians that focused on urological gynecology, gynecological oncology, full fertility services, advanced laparoscopy and general surgery. Several physicians had private urology practices at Weiss. Many of the gynecologic and urologic surgical procedures were performed by specialists using the DaVinci surgical system. At the time, it was the most minimally invasive robotic-assisted technology available.
- The Center for Integrative Medicine offered treatments in alternative medicine including acupuncture, healing touch, guided imagery and massage therapy.
- The Chicago Sleep Center offered treatments for sleep disorders and sleep issues by board-certified sleep medicine physicians.
- Chronic pain management services were provided by the APAC Centers for Pain Management, who remains one of the largest pain management companies in the Midwest.
- Nephrology services were provided by board certified Nephrologists from Optimum Kidney Care, S.C. Specializations included diabetes, kidney disease, resistant hypertension and proteinuria.
- Physicians affiliated with the Eye Surgery Center at Weiss Memorial Hospital included ophthalmologists in academics as well as private practice.
- Anesthesia at Weiss was provided through a negotiated contract with Continental Anesthesia Ltd.
- The Computed Tomography (CT) and Magnetic Resonance Imaging (MRI) departments at Weiss were accredited by the American College of Radiology(ACR).
- Chicago Health Medical Group partnered with Weiss Memorial Hospital to open a new specialty clinic at the Breakers of Edgewater Beach (5333 N Sheridan Rd, Chicago, IL 60640)

== Teaching ==
Early in the 21st century, the hospital hosted several residency programs. These included internal medicine with approximately 50 residents (including categorical, transitional and preliminary residents), as well as a podiatric medicine residents, and surgery residency (with approximately 11 residents). Emergency medicine residents from Midwestern University also worked in the emergency department.
