= United Surgical Partners International =

Ambulatory care company in Dallas, Texas

United Surgical Partners International, Inc.
- Type: Subsidiary
- Industry: Healthcare
- Founded: 1998; 28 years ago
- Founder: Don Steen
- Headquarters: 14201 Dallas Parkway, Dallas, Texas, U.S.
- Key people: Brett Brodnax (CEO)
- Number of employees: 19,000 (2020)
- Parent: Tenet Healthcare
- Website: www.uspi.com

United Surgical Partners International, Inc. (USPI) is an American ambulatory care company based in Dallas, Texas. It was founded by Don Steen in 1998.

USPI currently is active in 28 states. USPI currently operates over 400 ambulatory facilities. The company had partnerships with over 4,000 physicians and over 50 health systems in the United States, with over 19,000 employees. The company went public in 2001 and was taken private again in 2007.

In April 2015, USPI and Tenet Healthcare entered into an agreement to create an ambulatory surgery platform. The transaction was finalized in June 2015.

== History ==
United Surgical Partners International was founded in 1998 by Don Steen along with the primary stockholder Welsh, Carson, Anderson & Stowe.

The first USPI outpatient surgery facility was Dexeus Hospital in Barcelona, Spain. It was acquired in April 1998. The first US facilities were acquired with an acquisition in July 1998. They were in Tennessee, Missouri, and Alabama. he first hospital joint venture followed shortly in June 1999 with Baylor Health Care System.

In 2001, USPI acquired OrthoLink Physicians Corp., a provider of orthopedic physician practice management services and owner of surgery centers. {https://www.nashvillepost.com/home/ortholink-sold-to-dallas-based-united-surgical/article_b0752184-2bf3-53a2-8fb4-825c0c00c336.html}

== Business Strategy ==
The company has developed a three-way-joint-venture model which involves the connection of hospital partner + physician + management company. USPI enters a targeted market by acquiring or developing surgical facilities in partnership with local physicians and, wherever possible, with a local hospital or health system.
