= The Sudbury Devil =

- Theatrical release poster
- Directed by: Andrew Rakich
- Written by: Andrew Rakich
- Produced by: Andrew Rakich; Veronika Payton
- Starring: Benton Guinness; Linnea Gregg; Josh Popa; Matthew Van Gessel; Kendra Unique
- Cinematography: Eduardo Urueña
- Edited by: Andrew Rakich
- Music by: Dillon M. DeRosa
- Distributed by: Atun-Shei Films
- Release dates: September 9, 2023 (Salem, Massachusetts); September 10, 2023 (United States)
- Running time: 90 minutes
- Country: United States
- Language: English
- Budget: $25,000

The Sudbury Devil is a 2023 independent supernatural horror film written and directed by Andrew Rakich in his directorial debut. The film is set in late 17th century New England and follows a pair of witch hunters as they venture into the wilderness outside the town of Sudbury, Massachusetts, in search of demonic forces. The film is notable for its detailed authenticity to the era, including period sets, wardrobe, dialogue, and especially its use of the Early Modern English dialect.

== Plot ==
In 1678, two years after the end of King Philip's War, the Puritan witch hunters John Fletcher and Josiah Cutting travel to the small town of Sudbury, Massachusetts, investigating rumors of devil worship in the area. There they meet Reverend Thomas Russell and a disturbed local man named Isaac Goodenow, who claims to have seen demonic forces at work in a clearing outside of town. Bringing Goodenow as a guide, Fletcher and Cutting set off into the forest to investigate. After a day's journey, they reach the clearing and set up camp to watch and wait. During the night, they are visited by a mysterious woman whose presence goes unnoticed while they sleep.

Goodenow becomes increasingly erratic throughout the next day. That evening, in the midst of a heavy rainstorm, Fletcher witnesses him masturbating atop a large, altar-like stone. Believing he has made communion with the devil, they shackle him to a tree. While searching the forest nearby, they come across the campsite of a seemingly mad Black woman named Flora, whom Goodenow identifies as a slave of the widow Patience Gavett. Believing Flora is behind these satanic activities, they bind her arms and take her prisoner. Flora masturbates openly and seduces Fletcher into having sex with her during the night. The next morning, Cutting informs Fletcher that he knows of his fornication and will have to report his crime when they return to town.

That night, Fletcher witnesses a strange apparition in the form of a blinding white light. The next morning, he and Cutting find themselves restrained by Goodenow, Flora, and the mysterious woman revealed to be Patience Gavett, whose brutish husband Mr. Gavett owned this area of land. Patience announces that they will perform a satanic ritual using Fletcher's sperm to spawn a demon in Flora. They remain at the clearing for several days as Flora's pregnancy rapidly progresses. The ritual is unsuccessful, however, and Flora dies in childbirth.

Upset by the failure, Patience strips Cutting and has Goodenow lead him into the woods. When Fletcher pleads for her to spare his friend, she mocks him and tells him that she knows of the crimes he committed during the war fighting in the company of Captain Samuel Mosley. Fletcher runs away from the clearing in terror and wanders back through the forest in the direction of Sudbury. Patience, meanwhile, has Goodenow ritualistically kill himself in front of a horrified Cutting.

Fletcher stumbles upon a rescue party consisting of Reverend Russell and Mr. Gavett—revealed to be alive and well. Mr. Gavett informs Fletcher that Patience, whom he believed dead, has been missing since the Sudbury Fight. Together they set off back to the clearing to save Cutting and capture the others. They reach the abandoned clearing and set up camp. Mr. Gavett jumbles his words while saying grace before dinner, making Fletcher suspicious about his real identity.

After their meal, Mr. Gavett asks Fletcher to regale them with stories of his heroism during the war. Fletcher, however, reveals that his company committed barbaric acts against the natives and brutally murdered many women and children. Once the reverend has retired, Fletcher discovers that Mr. Gavett is in fact a shapeshifted Patience and that the real Mr. Gavett has indeed been dead all along. She reveals that she plans to attempt the ritual again without Flora.

The next day, Patience, still disguised as Mr. Gavett, leads Fletcher to Cutting, who appears to be rotting alive, and leaves them to kill Reverend Russell. Fletcher stabs Cutting out of mercy and sets off to stop Patience. They meet as the sun sets and fight viciously until both are mortally wounded. As they lie bleeding out from their wounds, they begin having sex. At the moment of climax, a bright light emanates from the altar into the sky. Patience experiences an even more rapid pregnancy than Flora and gives birth to the demon moments before succumbing to her wounds. The demon first appears as a blinding white light, but transforms into a silhouetted horned figure. Fletcher, with his dying breath, asks that the demon forever curse the town of Sudbury.

== Cast ==
- Benton Guinness as John Fletcher
- Linnea Gregg as Patience Gavett
- Josh Popa as Josiah Cutting
- Matthew Van Gessel as Isaac Goodenow
- Kendra Unique as Flora
- Carl Sailor as Thomas Russell
- Andrew Rakich as Mr. Gavett
- Christian Matyi as Coureur de Bois (voiced by Cody Godin-Lapointe)
- Drew Shuptar-Rayvis as Wampanoag Warrior
- Matthew Taylor-Raetz as White Man

== Production ==
Pre-production on The Sudbury Devil began when Rakich wrote the first draft of the script around Halloween 2019 while he worked to expand his YouTube channel "Atun-Shei Films." He later ran a crowdfunding campaign on Indiegogo in March 2020 to raise additional funds for filming, which was hampered by the outbreak of the COVID-19 pandemic. In a 2023 interview with Dread Central, Rakich recalled, "The timing for that crowdfunding was disastrous. It was March 2020, and COVID hit with full force halfway through. Donations dried up completely. We were set to film in May, but within a week it became apparent that wasn't going to happen." The delay ended up being a blessing in disguise for Rakich, however, as the timing coincided with his YouTube channel taking off and gave him more time to polish the script.

Rakich was able to use funds raised from his Patreon page and YouTube channel during the extended pre-production to further finance the film, bringing the production budget up to roughly $25,000. Principal photography took place over two weeks in April 2022. Filming locations included the historic Josiah Keith House in Easton, Massachusetts, and the mountains of Hampshire County, Massachusetts. Post-production took place over the next year-and-a-half and concluded shortly before the film's release in September 2023.

Unlike most traditional production models, The Sudbury Devil was made as a cooperative film production. The cast and crew were all given no upfront fee and instead worked for a first-dollar gross percentage of the film's box-office revenue.

The film was executive produced by the author Tabitha King.

== Release ==
The film's premiere was held on September 9, 2023, at The Satanic Temple in Salem, Massachusetts. This was followed by a limited theatrical run that included screenings across the United States, Australia, and the United Kingdom.

Rakich turned down multiple offers from film distributors owing to what he perceived as unreasonable terms, opting instead to self-distribute the film through the Atun-Shei Films website via video on demand in December 2023. In an interview with Daily Grindhouse, Rakich remarked, "Part of the reason we went with self-distribution was that by releasing through Vimeo's VHX service, we could basically get a much larger slice of the pie than by going through a traditional distributor. The cast and crew got the money that we made right away. A week after the movie came out, they had money in their bank accounts."

== Reception ==
Giallo Julian of Dread Central highly praised the film, describing it as "beautifully shot, well-performed, suitably eerie, and appropriately grotesque," adding, "any other indie flick will be hard-pressed to surpass The Sudbury Devil by this year's end."
