= 1996 Pulitzer Prize =

Awards for journalism and related fields

Winners of the Pulitzer Prizes for 1996 were:

== Journalism awards ==
- Beat reporting:
  - Bob Keeler of Newsday, Long Island, New York. For his detailed portrait of a progressive local Catholic parish and its parishioners.
- Spot News Reporting:
  - Robert D. McFadden of The New York Times. For his highly skilled writing and reporting on deadline during the year.
- Spot News Photography:
  - Charles Porter IV, a free-lancer. For his haunting photographs, taken after the Oklahoma City bombing and distributed by the Associated Press, showing a one-year-old victim handed to and then cradled by a local fireman.
- Commentary:
  - E.R. Shipp of the New York Daily News. For her penetrating columns on race, welfare and other social issues.
- Criticism:
  - Robert Campbell of The Boston Globe. For his knowledgeable writing on architecture.
- Editorial Cartooning:
  - Jim Morin of the Miami Herald.
- Editorial Writing:
  - Robert B. Semple, Jr. of The New York Times. For his editorials on environmental issues.
- Explanatory Reporting:
  - Laurie Garrett of Newsday, Long Island, New York. For her courageous reporting from Zaire on the Ebola virus outbreak there. (The winner was entered and nominated in the International Reporting category and was moved by the Pulitzer Prize Board to Explanatory Journalism.)
- Feature Photography:
  - Stephanie Welsh, a free-lancer. For her shocking sequence of photos, published by Newhouse News Service, of a female genital cutting rite in Kenya.
- Feature Writing:
  - Rick Bragg of The New York Times. For his elegantly written stories about contemporary America.
- International Reporting:
  - David Rohde of The Christian Science Monitor. For his persistent on-site reporting of the massacre of thousands of Bosnian Muslims in Srebrenica.
- Investigative Reporting:
  - Staff of the Orange County Register, Santa Ana, California. For reporting that uncovered fraudulent and unethical fertility practices at a leading research university hospital and prompted key regulatory reforms.
- National Reporting:
  - Alix M. Freedman of The Wall Street Journal. For her coverage of the tobacco industry, including a report that exposed how ammonia additives heighten nicotine potency.
- Public Service:
  - The News & Observer, Raleigh, North Carolina. For the work of Melanie Sill, Pat Stith and Joby Warrick on the environmental and health risks of waste disposal systems used in North Carolina's growing hog industry.

== Letters, Drama and Music Awards ==
- Biography or Autobiography:
  - God: A Biography by Jack Miles (Alfred A. Knopf)
- Fiction:
  - Independence Day by Richard Ford (Alfred A. Knopf)
- General Nonfiction:
  - The Haunted Land: Facing Europe's Ghosts After Communism by Tina Rosenberg (Random House)
- History:
  - William Cooper's Town: Power and Persuasion on the Frontier of the Early American Republic by Alan Taylor (Alfred A. Knopf)
- Poetry:
  - The Dream of the Unified Field by Jorie Graham (The Ecco Press)
- Drama:
  - Rent by Jonathan Larson (Rob Weisbach Books/William Morrow)
- Music:
  - Lilacs by George Walker (MMB Music)

== Special Citations ==
- Pulitzer Prize Special Citations and Awards
  - Herb Caen, local columnist of the San Francisco Chronicle, for his extraordinary and continuing contribution as a voice and conscience of his city.
