= Alfred Knopf =

Alfred Knopf may refer to:

- Alfred A. Knopf Sr. (1892–1984), founder of Alfred A. Knopf, Inc., the publishing company
- Alfred A. Knopf Jr. (1918–2009), son of Alfred A. Knopf, Sr.
- Alfred A. Knopf or Knopf Publishing Group, subsidiary of Random House
