= American Creation =

Book by Joseph Ellis

American Creation: Triumphs and Tragedies at the Founding of the Republic
- Book cover of American Creation
- Author: Joseph Ellis
- Language: English
- Genre: Non-fiction
- Publisher: Alfred A. Knopf
- Publication date: 2007
- Publication place: United States
- Media type: Print (Hardback and Paperback)
- Pages: 283
- ISBN: 978-0-307-26369-8
- OCLC: 83609481
- Dewey Decimal: 973.3 22
- LC Class: E302.1 .E44 2007

American Creation: Triumphs and Tragedies at the Founding of the Republic is a 2007 non-fiction book written by American historian Joseph Ellis and published by Alfred A. Knopf, examining the successes and failures of the Founding Fathers. Structured episodically, the book examines six turning points in the early history of the United States: the writing of the Declaration of Independence, George Washington's winter at Valley Forge, James Madison's debate with Patrick Henry over Constitutional ratification, Washington's treaty with Creek leader Alexander McGillivray, Thomas Jefferson and James Madison's founding of the Democratic-Republican Party, and the Louisiana Purchase.

Ellis, who had previously won the National Book Award and the Pulitzer Prize for History, wanted to write a book portraying the Founders neither as demigods nor villains, but as flawed men who were improvising in response to immediate crises. The book reached #4 on The New York Times Best Seller list, and received largely positive reviews from critics.

== Background ==
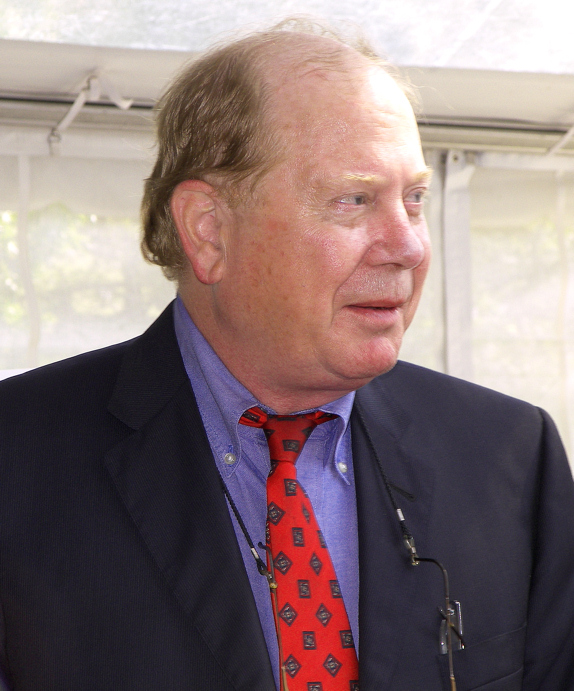
Joseph Ellis in 2007

Joseph Ellis is an American professor of history who held an endowed Ford Foundation Chair at Mount Holyoke College in Massachusetts. His previous works on the Founding Fathers had received several awards, including a 1997 National Book Award for American Sphinx: The Character of Thomas Jefferson and the 2001 Pulitzer Prize for History for his Founding Brothers: The Revolutionary Generation. American Creation was his sixth book.

Ellis states in American Creation's foreword that the book was prompted by repeated questions he received on his 2000 book tour for Founding Brothers negatively comparing presidential candidates George W. Bush and Al Gore to the Founders. His difficulty in properly assessing the Founders made him want to write a book that both acknowledged their achievements and punctured the myth that they were "demigods". He stated in an interview that he wanted to show that "these folks didn't completely understand what they were doing... They were improvising on the edge of catastrophe." Ellis did the research for the book personally, rather than working with research assistants. He wrote the manuscript by hand with a rollerball pen.

== Content ==
American Creation consists of a foreword, six chapters, and an afterword. In the prologue, Ellis discusses what he calls the "stunning achievement" of the Founders in creating a nation that became "the accepted global formula for national success". He criticizes the "wildly extravagant claims and equally hyperbolic counterclaims" that deify or vilify the Founders, particularly those of academic historians who treat the Founders as "racists, classists, and sexists". In contrast, Ellis states his intention to present a balanced portrayal of Founders—acknowledging their successes, such as the creation of a nation-sized, secular republic governed by political parties, as well as their failures to deal with slavery and to reach a just settlement with Native Americans.

The book's first chapter, "The Year", examines the Declaration of Independence as well as the American Revolutionary War. Ellis discusses how, "latently and surreptitiously", the Declaration held more long-term revolutionary implications than the Founders realized. The second chapter, "The Winter", discusses General George Washington's achievement in holding the Continental Army together during a hard winter at Valley Forge. The army's poor condition causes a critical shift in strategy that would prove decisive for the Americans, forcing Washington to attempt to control the countryside rather than stage a decisive battle with the British.

The third chapter, "The Argument", details James Madison's efforts to secure a strong federal government at the 1787 Constitutional Convention. Madison fails to win approval for a national government that can veto state laws, and initially considers the convention a failure. Instead the Constitution creates a political system in which sovereignty is shared and "blurred", providing a framework for ongoing debate. Madison emphasizes this advantage, as well as the weakness of the prior Articles of Confederation government during the Revolutionary War, to defeat Anti-Federalist orator Patrick Henry in a debate over Virginia's ratification of the Constitution. Chapter Four, "The Treaty", considers Washington's failure as president to reach an equitable settlement with Native Americans, with particular consideration to his treaty with Creek leader Alexander McGillivray. Though Washington declares the issue one of his highest priorities and successfully negotiates a treaty, it proves worthless in the face of the relentless expansion of white settlers into Creek territory, the intransigence of the Georgian legislature, and McGillivray's attempts to ally with Spain. Ellis calls the inability to make a fair peace with Native Americans "the greatest failure of the revolutionary generation", second only to their failure to end slavery.

The fifth chapter, "The Conspiracy", presents the achievement of Thomas Jefferson and James Madison in creating American party politics by forming the Democratic-Republican Party. Even as he works to undermine Washington's administration from within, however, (Note: Jefferson served as George Washington's Secretary of State from 1790 to 1793, resigning near the end of Washington's first term.) Jefferson disparages party politics and denies that he is capable of acting in a partisan fashion, thus failing to understand his own accomplishment. "The Purchase", the book's final chapter, explores the story behind the 1803 Louisiana Purchase, (Note: In the Louisiana Purchase, the US bought 828,000 square miles (2,140,000 km^{2}) of France's claim to the territory of Louisiana.) discussing President Jefferson's achievement in making the Purchase but also his failure to prohibit slavery in the new territory. Ellis argues that Jefferson thus set the nation on the course that would lead to the Civil War, and that as a result, "tragedy trumped triumph in the story of the Purchase". In the afterword, Ellis states that "perhaps the most creative act of the founding era" was "an expanding liberal mandate that left room, up ahead, for an Abraham Lincoln and a Martin Luther King to join the list of founders."

== Reception ==
American Creation sold well on release, rising to #4 on The New York Times Best Seller list in November 2007.

Publishers Weekly gave the book a starred review, stating, "This subtle, brilliant examination of the period between the War of Independence and the Louisiana Purchase puts Pulitzer-winner Ellis (Founding Brothers) among the finest of America's narrative historians." Jon Meacham, reviewing the book for The New York Times, called the book "illuminating", writing that it goes "beyond the familiar critique of the founding to explore a point that remains underappreciated: that America was constructed to foster arguments, not to settle them". Michiko Kakutani of The New York Times also praised the book, writing that "It is Ellis's achievement that he leaves us with a keen appreciation of the good fortune America had in having the right men in the right places at the right times".

In the Chicago Tribune, Debby Applegate stated that "'American Creation' is one of the most enjoyable and thought-provoking books I've read in years." Cindy Kibbe, writing in the New Hampshire Business Review, said of the book, "Filled with powerful, masterfully drawn word-pictures and eye-opening insights, Ellis's 'American Creation' should be a must-read for anyone prior to going to the voting polls ... 'American Creation' lets us know we still have much to learn from, both good and bad, from the founding of our nation".

In The Boston Globe, H.W. Brands called Ellis "the reigning master of the episodic approach to history"; he complimented the book's style but disagreed with Ellis' conclusion that blurred sovereignty was one of the Constitution's greatest strengths. Jonathan Yardley of The Washington Post wrote that he felt Ellis' portrait of the Founders was largely accurate, but that in his reading of the slavery issue, he was "a trifle guilty of the 'presentism' – seeing the past through the prism of the present – that he elsewhere deplores". Reviewing for The Christian Science Monitor, Randy Dotinga wrote that the book's close examination of "dry and tedious" political debates "makes for rough sledding at times", and criticized Ellis' dismissal of academic historians. However, he concluded that "Ellis's sharp writing style and appreciation for irony are saving graces".
