= Ashbel Green (editor) =

American book editor (1928–2012)

- Born: March 15, 1928; Manhattan, New York, U.S.
- Died: September 18, 2012 (aged 84); Westerly, Rhode Island, U.S.
- Education: Kent School; Columbia University (BA, MA)
- Occupation: Book editor
- Years active: 1964–2017
- Employer: Alfred A. Knopf

Ashbel Green (March 15, 1928 – September 18, 2012) was an American book editor. He was a senior editor and vice president at Alfred A. Knopf. He oversaw the publication of over 500 books including books by Gabriel García Márquez and Walter Cronkite's autobiography. He was "one of the finest history editors in all of American history…[and] helped make the Knopf imprint the most distinguished in the United States."

== Early life ==
Green was born in Manhattan, New York. He was named after his ancestor, Ashbel Green (1762-1848), a Presbyterian minister.

He graduated from Kent School in 1945. He served in the Navy Reserve from 1946 to 1948. He received a bachelor's in 1950 from Columbia College. There, he was a member of St. Anthony Hall, the Humanist Club, the Activities Council, and the University Student Council. He was also president of WKCR radio and was on the staff Spectator. He was a member of the varsity tennis and swimming teams.

He also earned a master's from Columbia University in East European history in 1952.

== Career ==
He began his career in the publishing business at Prentice Hall, working in publicity. In 1964, he started with Alfred A. Knopf which was owned by Random House. In 1994, he was a senior editor and vice president of Random House.

Green specialized in editing autobiographies, biographies, current affairs, history, and public policy. He shepherded President George H. W. Bush and U.S. national security advisor Brent Scowcroft for A World Transformed in 1998. He also worked with historian Joseph J. Ellis on Founding Brothers: The Revolutionary Generation which won a Pulitzer Prize for History in 2000.

Green had a particular interest in international writers, overseeing books by Milovan Djilas, Vaclav Havel, Gabriel García Márquez, Andrei D. Sakharov, and Jacobo Timerman. He actually stole Márquez from Harper & Row based on his experience with Latin American authors. In the realm of mystery novels, Green helped Ross Macdonald develop from a modestly-selling mystery writer to a best-selling novelist.

He retired in 2007 as senior editor and vice president. However, he continued to work with a small number of select authors including Joseph Ellis.

== Personal life ==
Green married Anna Welsh McCagg. Their children were a son, Ashbel, and a daughter, Alison. Anna died in 1995. Green then married Elizabeth Osha. They lived in Stonington, Connecticut.

Green was chair of the publications committee for Columbia University's year-long anniversary, Columbia 250. As chair of the Publications Committee for the 250th, he edited My Columbia: Reminiscences of University Life about Columbia University.

Green died in Westerly, Rhode Island of cardiac arrest in 2012.
