= Edwin H. Knopf =

American film director, producer and screenwriter (1899–1981)

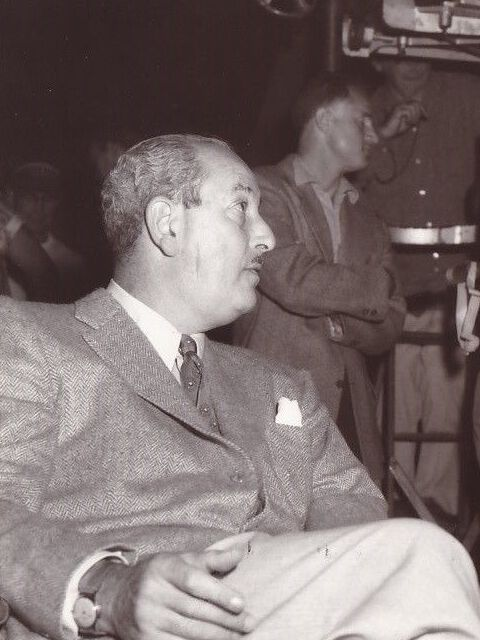
- Knopf on the set of Diane (1956)
- Born: November 11, 1899; New York City, New York, U.S.
- Died: December 27, 1981 (aged 82); U.S.
- Occupations: Film producer, film director, screenwriter
- Children: Christopher Knopf
- Parent(s): Samuel Knopf; Lillian Harris Knopf
- Relatives: Alfred A. Knopf Sr. (half-brother); Alfred A. Knopf Jr. (nephew)

Edwin H. Knopf (November 11, 1899 – December 27, 1981) was an American film producer, film director, and screenwriter.

== Biography ==
He was born in New York City and went to work early in his life in the editorial department of his brother Alfred A. Knopf's publishing business.

After trying his hand at acting, Edwin turned to producing in 1928. Soon after being involved in several hit plays, he moved to Hollywood and found work as a director and screenwriter. Among his films as a director was Paramount on Parade (1930). As a producer, he was involved in the making of such films as B.F.'s Daughter (1948), Malaya (1949), The Law and the Lady (producer and director, 1951), Lili (1953), and The Glass Slipper (1955).

Sketches of Edwin's early life in Italy are included in the book he wrote with his wife Mildred O. Knopf, The Food of Italy and How To Prepare It (New York: Alfred A. Knopf, 1964).

== Selected filmography ==
- Paramount on Parade (1930) - director
- The Rebel (1932) - director
- The Seventh Cross (1944) - producer
- The Sailor Takes a Wife (1945) - producer
- The Valley of Decision (1945) - producer
- The Secret Heart (1946) - producer
- Cynthia (1947) - producer
- B.F.'s Daughter (1948) - producer
- Malaya (1949) - producer
- Edward, My Son (1949) - producer
- The Law and the Lady (1951) - producer, director
- Night Into Morning (1951) - producer
- Mr. Imperium (1951) - producer
- Fearless Fagan (1952) - producer
- Lili (1953) - producer
- Scandal at Scourie (1953) - producer
- The Great Diamond Robbery (1954) - producer
- The King's Thief (1955) - producer
- The Glass Slipper (1955) - producer
- Diane (1956) - producer
- Gaby (1956) - producer
- Tip on a Dead Jockey (1957) - producer
- The Vintage (1957) - producer
- Rendezvous (1960–61) - producer
