= His Excellency: George Washington =

2004 biography by Joseph Ellis

- Author: Joseph Ellis
- Language: English
- Genre: Biography
- Publisher: Alfred A. Knopf
- Publication date: 2004
- Publication place: United States
- Media type: Print (hardcover and paperback)
- Pages: 320 pp (first edition)
- ISBN: 1-4000-4031-0 hardcover ISBN 1-4000-3253-9 paperback
- OCLC: 54817026
- Dewey Decimal: 973.4/1/092 B
- LC Class: E312 .E245 2004

His Excellency: George Washington is a 2004 biography of the first President of the United States, General George Washington. It was written by Joseph Ellis, a professor of History at Mount Holyoke College, who specializes in the Founding Fathers of the United States, the American Revolution, and the Federalist Era.

== Content ==
=== Events and themes ===
In the text, Ellis focuses on three main areas of Washington's life:

- military adventures during the Seven Years' War (French and Indian War)
- generalship in the American Revolution
- service as first President of the United States.

According to Ellis, Washington was always searching for a means to control his inner passions and his destiny. He fumed under the control that the British held over him during the Colonial America period. In particular, he was frustrated by the lack of respect offered for his military achievements to granting land claim rights in the west. As a general, he bemoaned the lack of control the fledgling Continental Congress had over the colonies which composed it. (Later as President, he supported legislation to ensure control by the federal government over the states.)

As a man forced to make his own destiny, he made the theme of control central to his life. He asserted such control in his decisions at his beloved plantation, Mount Vernon.

=== Chapters ===
- Preface: The Man In The Moon
- Chapter One: Interior Regions
- Chapter Two: The Strenuous Squire
- Chapter Three: First In War
- Chapter Four: Destiny's Child
- Chapter Five: Introspective Interlude
- Chapter Six: First In Peace
- Chapter Seven: Testaments

=== Quotes ===
- He was the epitome of the man's man: physically strong, mentally enigmatic, emotionally restrained.
- If his views on slavery were typical of his time and his class, there was one area in which he proved an exception to the pattern of behavior expected of a prominent Virginia gentleman: he was excessively and conspicuously assiduous in the defense of his own interests, especially when he suspected he was being cheated out of money or land.
- Because he could not afford to fail, he could not afford to trust. For the rest of his life, all arguments based on the principle of mutual trust devoid of mutual interest struck him as sentimental nonsense.
- Ideals were not irrelevant to Washington, but he was deeply suspicious of any idealistic agenda that floated above the realities of power on the ground.
- He was that rarest of men: a supremely realistic visionary, a prudent prophet whose final position on slavery served as the capstone to a career devoted to getting the big things right. His genius was his judgment.
- Unlike Julius Caesar and Oliver Cromwell before him, and Napoleon, Lenin, and Mao after him, he understood that the greater glory resided in posterity's judgment. If you aspire to live forever in the memory of future generations, you must demonstrate the ultimate self-confidence to leave the final judgment to them. And he did.
- Washington's task was to change the improbable into the inevitable.

== Reviews ==
The historian Gordon S. Wood, who has also written about the Revolutionary and federalist periods, wrote in his review in The New Republic that "Ellis's portrait of Washington thus humanizes the man without knocking him off the pedestal where his contemporaries placed him. This Washington is all the greater because he is a real human being with both passions and principles." He also wrote, "Joseph J. Ellis ... has been a one-man historical machine... Ellis has entered the ranks of that tiny group of popular historians, including David McCullough, Walter Isaacson, and Ron Chernow, who sell copies of their books in the tens and even hundreds of thousands."
