= Jodi Lynn Anderson =

American children's writer

- Citizenship: American
- Education: University of Maryland (BA); Bennington College (MFA)
- Occupation: Children's writer
- Website: jodilynnanderson.com

Jodi Lynn Anderson is an American children's writer.

== Early life and education ==
Anderson grew up in northern New Jersey. She attended college in the University of Maryland where she graduated with a BA in British Literature. She went on to get an MFA in Writing and Literature from Bennington College.

== Career ==
Anderson started her career in books as a book editor at HarperCollins in NYC. Since then she has gone on to write fiction for young people and had a New York Times bestselling novel. She has spent time living in Georgia and Washington DC but currently lives in Asheville, North Carolina. Anderson is married with one son.

== Bibliography ==
May Bird

- The Ever After (2005)
- Among the Stars (2006)
- Warrior Princess (2007)

Peaches

- Peaches (2005)
- The Secrets of Peaches (2006)
- Love and Peaches (2008)

Novels

- Loser/Queen (2010)
- Tiger Lily (2012)
- The Vanishing Season (2014)
- The Moment Collector (2014)
- My Diary from the Edge of the World (2015)
- Midnight at the Electric (2017)
