= Original Meanings =

Book by Jack N. Rakove

Original Meanings: Politics and Ideas in the Making of the Constitution
- Author: Jack N. Rakove
- Language: English
- Publisher: Knopf
- Publication date: 1996
- Publication place: United States
- Pages: 455
- ISBN: 978-0-394-57858-3

Original Meanings: Politics and Ideas in the Making of the Constitution is a non-fiction book authored by Jack N. Rakove and published on March 25, 1996 in hardcover by Knopf and on May 26, 1997 by Vintage Books in paperback. Rakove investigates the meaning of the United States Constitution in modern-day society and political topics. It won the 1997 Pulitzer Prize for History.
