= May Bird and the Ever After =

Book by Jodi Lynn Anderson

- First edition cover
- Author: Jodi Lynn Anderson
- Illustrator: Leonid Gore
- Language: English
- Series: May Bird
- Genre: Young adult fantasy/action
- Publisher: Atheneum
- Publication date: 2005
- Publication place: United States
- Media type: Print
- Pages: 336 (original hardcover); 317 (paperback)
- ISBN: 0-689-86923-1
- OCLC: 56404439
- LC Class: PZ7.A53675 Mayb 2005
- Followed by: May Bird: Among the Stars

May Bird and the Ever After is a fantasy/action young adult novel by Jodi Lynn Anderson. It was released in 2005, published by Atheneum Books and is the first book in the May Bird series.

== Plot ==
May Bird lives alone with her mother and her cat, Somber Kitty (a Sphynx cat), on the edge of a wooded swamp in West Virginia. She loves to draw and make believe, but does not fit in at school. Most people are not very comfortable in the woods, but "the woods of Briery Swamp fit May Bird like a fuzzy mitten". There, she is safe from school and the taunts and teases of the kids who do not understand her. Hidden in the trees, May imagines herself as a warrior princess, with her cat as her brave guardian. Then one day, May falls into the lake.

When she crawls out, May finds herself in a world that is inhabited by things she thought were just in her imagination. She sees many ghosts and other amazing creatures. A ghost named Pumpkin (with a pumpkin head) is her house ghost, or her guardian, and follows her into the lake to help her through. So does her faithful cat after she does not return. It is a place that few live living people have ever seen, the place where "towns glow blue beneath zipping stars and the people walk through walls". Here the Book of the Dead holds the answers to everything in the universe, and here, if May is discovered, the horrifyingly evil Bo Cleevil will destroy her. May Bird must get out. This is the beginning of May Bird's daring journey into the Ever After, a haunting place where true friends—and many terrible foes—await her on every corner. She gets help from Pumpkin, who lives with the Beekeeper Arista in a giant house shaped like a beehive. She is told that she needs to go see the Lady of North Farm, a place no ghost is willing to go.

Along the journey May meets new friends and sees unimaginable sights and faces many strange adventures. The journey she is faced with is a journey that will forever be with her, whether she is dead or alive.

== Trilogy ==
This trilogy consists of three books:

- May Bird and the Ever After
- May Bird Among the Stars
- May Bird, Warrior Princess

== Reception ==
May Bird and the Ever After received a positive reception from critics and readers, such as Kirkus Reviews, who described the novel as "rare fun".
