= Been in the Storm So Long =

1979 history book by Leon Litwack

Been in the Storm So Long: The Aftermath of Slavery
- First edition
- Author: Leon Litwack
- Genre: History
- Publisher: Knopf
- Publication date: 1979
- Publication place: US
- Pages: 672
- Awards: Pulitzer Prize for History
- ISBN: 978-0394743981

Been in the Storm So Long: The Aftermath of Slavery is a 1979 book by American historian Leon Litwack, published by Knopf. The book chronicles the African-American experience following the 1863 Emancipation Proclamation.

== Awards ==
In 1980, the book won the American Book Award and the Pulitzer Prize for History.
