= Schilling Playhouse =

American/British television anthology series (1958–1960)

- Also known as: Rendezvous
- Genre: Anthology series

Production
- Producer: Edwin H. Knopf
- Running time: 30 minutes

Original release
- Network: Syndicated
- Release: 1958 – 1960

Schilling Playhouse, originally titled Rendezvous, is an American/British 30 minute anthology series produced for syndication by Edwin H. Knopf. The first season's episodes were filmed in the United States, and episodes thereafter filmed in the UK. Approximately 40 episodes were made.

Charles Drake was the host, and among the guest stars were Patricia Neal, Peter O'Toole, Bert Lahr, Gary Merrill, Mel Ferrer, Donald Pleasence, Leslie Dwyer, Lois Maxwell, and Kim Hunter. It was one of the first major television appearances for actress Connie Hines, in the first season episode "Mean Mountain".

Originally planned to run on CBS, Rendezvous was replaced by Desilu Playhouse, which led to Rendezvous's being put into syndication. The Schilling division of McCormick & Company bought Rendezvous in 1959. Renamed The Schilling Playhouse, the series was initially broadcast on KABC-TV in Los Angeles and KRON-TV in San Francisco.
