= American Sphinx =

1996 book about Thomas Jefferson written by Joseph Ellis

American Sphinx: The Character of Thomas Jefferson
- Cover of 1998 Vintage paperback edition.
- Author: Joseph Ellis
- Language: English
- Genre: History
- Publisher: Knopf
- Publication date: 1996
- Publication place: United States
- Media type: Print (hardcover and paperback)
- Pages: 384
- ISBN: 0-679-44490-4 (first edition, hardcover)
- OCLC: 34934008

American Sphinx: The Character of Thomas Jefferson, is a 1996 book written by Joseph Ellis, a professor of history at Mount Holyoke College. It won the 1997 National Book Award for Nonfiction.

== Overview ==
Ellis' approach to explaining the character of Thomas Jefferson begins on June 20, 1775, with Jefferson's arrival in Philadelphia as the Colony of Virginia's delegate to the Continental Congress and the drafting of the Declaration of Independence. He follows through to the president's retirement at Monticello. Central to the book are Jefferson's contradictions and inconsistencies. Ellis covers Jefferson's career as ambassador to France, Secretary of State, planter and president.

He did not always speak exactly as he felt, either towards his friends or his enemies. As a consequence, he has left hanging over a part of his public life a vapor of duplicity..., the presence of which is generally felt more than it is seen.

— - Charles Francis Adams

Ellis showed how Jefferson shied away from public attention. According to Ellis, Jefferson gave just two public speeches as President of the United States. Thomas Jefferson felt far more comfortable writing, to which the Declaration of Independence attests, than public speaking. He worked extensively behind the scenes with other politicians to accomplish his political programs and create alliances.

Ellis praises Thomas Jefferson's first term as one of the most successful of any US presidency in terms of achieving stated goals; in his first term, Jefferson made the Louisiana Purchase, which would so affect the character of the United States, and significantly reduced the federal budget. But what sets Jefferson apart from other U.S. presidents, particularly John Adams, was his uniquely "feminine" approach to politics. Detesting direct confrontation, he was a master "dinner table" politician. He was known for inviting his competitors to dinner to plant the seeds of his ideas and defuse controversies.

== Reception ==
Brent Staples in the New York Times Book Review commented, "Joseph J. Ellis's American Sphinx is a brief and elegant return to Monticello. Mr. Ellis...is a remarkably clear writer, mercifully free of both the groveling and the spirit of attack that have dominated the subject in the past....'American Sphinx' is fresh and uncluttered but rich in historical context." Like several of his other books, American Sphinx was a bestseller.

== Relationship between Jefferson and Hemings ==
Ellis suggested in the text that evidence for an affair between Thomas Jefferson and Sally Hemings was "inconclusive". Specifically, Ellis stated in the appendix to American Sphinx,

Unless the trustees of the Thomas Jefferson Memorial Foundation decide to exhume the remains and do DNA testing on Jefferson as well as some of his alleged progeny, it leaves the matter a mystery about which advocates on either side can freely speculate...This means that for those who demand an answer the only recourse is plausible conjecture, prefaced as it must be with profuse statements about the flimsy and wholly circumstantial character of the evidence. In that spirit, which we might call the spirit of responsible speculation, after five years mulling over the huge cache of evidence that does exist on the thought and character of the historical Jefferson, I have concluded that the likelihood of a liaison with Sally Hemings is remote.

In 1997 Annette Gordon-Reed analyzed the historiography in her book Thomas Jefferson and Sally Hemings: An American Controversy. She noted that historians had accepted Jefferson descendants' denials while overlooking significant evidence that supported the paternity thesis, such as Madison Hemings' memoir attesting to his parentage, the facts that the Hemings family was the only one that Jefferson freed, and that Hemings only conceived when Jefferson was at Monticello (based on documentation by the biographer Dumas Malone).

In part because of Gordon-Reed's book, a team undertook a DNA study to try to settle the issue. In November 1998 Dr. Eugene Foster and his team published an article in Nature, reporting on their analysis of DNA data from descendants of Jefferson, Eston Hemings, the Carr family and Thomas Woodson. Foster said that there was a match between the Jefferson line and that of the Hemings' descendant, for which, with historical evidence, the simplest explanation was that Jefferson was the father of Eston, and likely Hemings' other children. The DNA tests conclusively proved that the Carr line and descendant of Eston Hemings were not related. This overturned the more than 150 years' contention by the Jefferson family and historians that his nephews, the Carr(s), were more likely fathers.

On November 2, 1998, The NewsHour with Jim Lehrer ran a feature on this topic, reporting that, "according to an article in an upcoming issue of the journal Nature, DNA analysis shows that Jefferson almost certainly fathered at least one of Sally Hemings' children, her last son, Eston." Ellis, who was interviewed during this broadcast, said that he had revised his opinion due to this new evidence:

It's not so much a change of heart, but this is really new evidence. And it—prior to this evidence, I think it was a very difficult case to know and circumstantial on both sides, and, in part, because I got it wrong, I think I want to step forward and say this new evidence constitutes, well, evidence beyond any reasonable doubt that Jefferson had a longstanding sexual relationship with Sally Hemings. Even though the match is only with one of the Hemings' descendants, Eston Hemings, it's inconceivable that Jefferson, who was 65 when Eston was born, would have made a one-night stand here. I think this is a longstanding relationship. When it began and what the character of the relationship is we probably can't know easily or at all. But it was, without question, an enduring one.

External videos
- Washington Journal interview with Ellis about DNA evidence identifying Thomas Jefferson as the father of one of Sally Hemmings's children, November 7, 1998, C-SPAN

He noted, "In the wake of the DNA revelations, an already-clear pattern of denial in Jefferson's life is deepened and darkened." After the results of the DNA testing, Ellis published essays coauthored with the geneticist Eric S. Lander in Nature and U.S. News & World Report. Ellis said, "As one who had suggested that we could not know the truth, I felt a special obligation to take the lead when the DNA evidence finally made the truth available." In 2001 Ellis took students on a field trip to Monticello to survey the response of visitors to the results of the DNA tests. They found that "eighty percent of those polled were unmoved by findings they'd assumed all along were fact ... scholars not the public, it turned out, were the ones taken by surprise."

Ellis' revised position confirmed that of the late UCLA professor of history, Fawn Brodie. She had publicized new evidence for this relationship in her 1974 biography, Thomas Jefferson: An Intimate History, by noting that Jefferson was always at Monticello during Hemings' conception times for her children, and she never conceived when he was not there.
