= Mr. Imperium =

1951 film by Don Hartman

- Directed by: Don Hartman
- Screenplay by: Edwin H. Knopf; Don Hartman
- Based on: Mr. Imperium play by Edwin H. Knopf
- Produced by: Edwin H. Knopf
- Starring: Lana Turner; Ezio Pinza; Marjorie Main; Barry Sullivan
- Cinematography: George J. Folsey
- Edited by: George White; William B. Gulick
- Music by: Bronislau Kaper
- Production company: Metro-Goldwyn-Mayer
- Release date: March 2, 1951
- Running time: 87 minutes
- Country: United States
- Language: English
- Budget: $1,530,000
- Box office: $755,000

Mr. Imperium (UK title: You Belong to My Heart) is a 1951 romantic musical drama film produced by Metro-Goldwyn-Mayer and starring Lana Turner and singer Ezio Pinza. Filmed in Technicolor, it was directed by Don Hartman, who cowrote the screenplay with Edwin H. Knopf based on a play written by Knopf. The musical score was composed by Bronisław Kaper. Turner's singing voice was dubbed by Trudy Erwin.

In 1979, the film entered the public domain in the United States because Metro-Goldwyn-Mayer neglected to renew the film's copyright registration in the 28th year after publication.

== Plot ==
The full film

In Italy in 1939, Mr. Imperium employs a ruse to meet attractive American woman Frederica Brown. He is revealed to be Prince Alexis, an heir to the throne and a widower with a five-year-old son. Mr. Imperium nicknames her Fredda and she calls him Al.

When his father becomes gravely ill, Mr. Imperium must rush to be with him but asks prime minister Bernand to deliver a note of explanation to Fredda. Bernand instead informs her that the prince has left permanently, as he would often do after seducing women.

Twelve years later, Fredda is now a film star known as Fredda Barlo. Mr. Imperium travels to California, where film producer Paul Hunter is in love with Fredda and proposing marriage. Fredda drives to Palm Springs to consider the proposal and decide which actor should costar in her next film, which will tell the story about a girl who falls in love with a king. Mr. Imperium takes a room next to hers, and soon they meet and embrace. He explains the crisis that took place at home during the war and that had prevented him from finding her. He wants a new life, and Fredda believes that he could portray the king in her film.

Bernand appears, announcing that his son is preparing to ascend to the throne. Mr. Imperium realizes that he is needed there, so he must say goodbye to Fredda once more.

== Cast ==
- Lana Turner as Fredda Barlo
- Ezio Pinza as Mr. Imperium
- Marjorie Main as Mrs. Cabot
- Barry Sullivan as Paul Hunter
- Cedric Hardwicke as Bernand
- Debbie Reynolds as Gwen
- Ann Codee as Anna Pelan
- The Guadalajara Trio as Themselves

== Production ==
MGM announced the casting of Ezio Pinza, for his first starring role, in July 1949. Greer Garson had been cast in the lead female role, but MGM replaced her with Lana Turner in February 1950.

During production on August 8, 1950, Pinza was thrown from a horse while filming a scene. He suffered minor injuries and returned the next day.

== Soundtrack ==
- "Andiamo", lyric by Dorothy Fields, music by Harold Arlen

== Release ==
Mr. Imperium was the first of two musicals that MGM attempted with South Pacific stage star and former Metropolitan Opera singer Ezio Pinza. When previews with test audiences proved disastrous, the second film, Strictly Dishonorable, was released first, but with the same unfavorable results.

The film was exhibited mostly as a second feature despite its lavish MGM production in Technicolor and with Lana Turner in a starring role. MGM canceled Pinza's contract after the film's box-office failure.

== Reception ==
In a contemporary review for The New York Times, critic A. H. Weiler called the film "third-rate" and wrote: "Edwin H. Knopf, the producer, and Don Hartman, the director, who collaborated on the script, have supplied their stars with a story that is as pat, obvious and dated as Prince Charming and Cinderella."

According to MGM, the film earned $460,000 in the U.S. and Canada and $295,000 elsewhere, resulting in a loss of $1,399,000.
