= Blanche Knopf =

American book publisher (1894–1966)

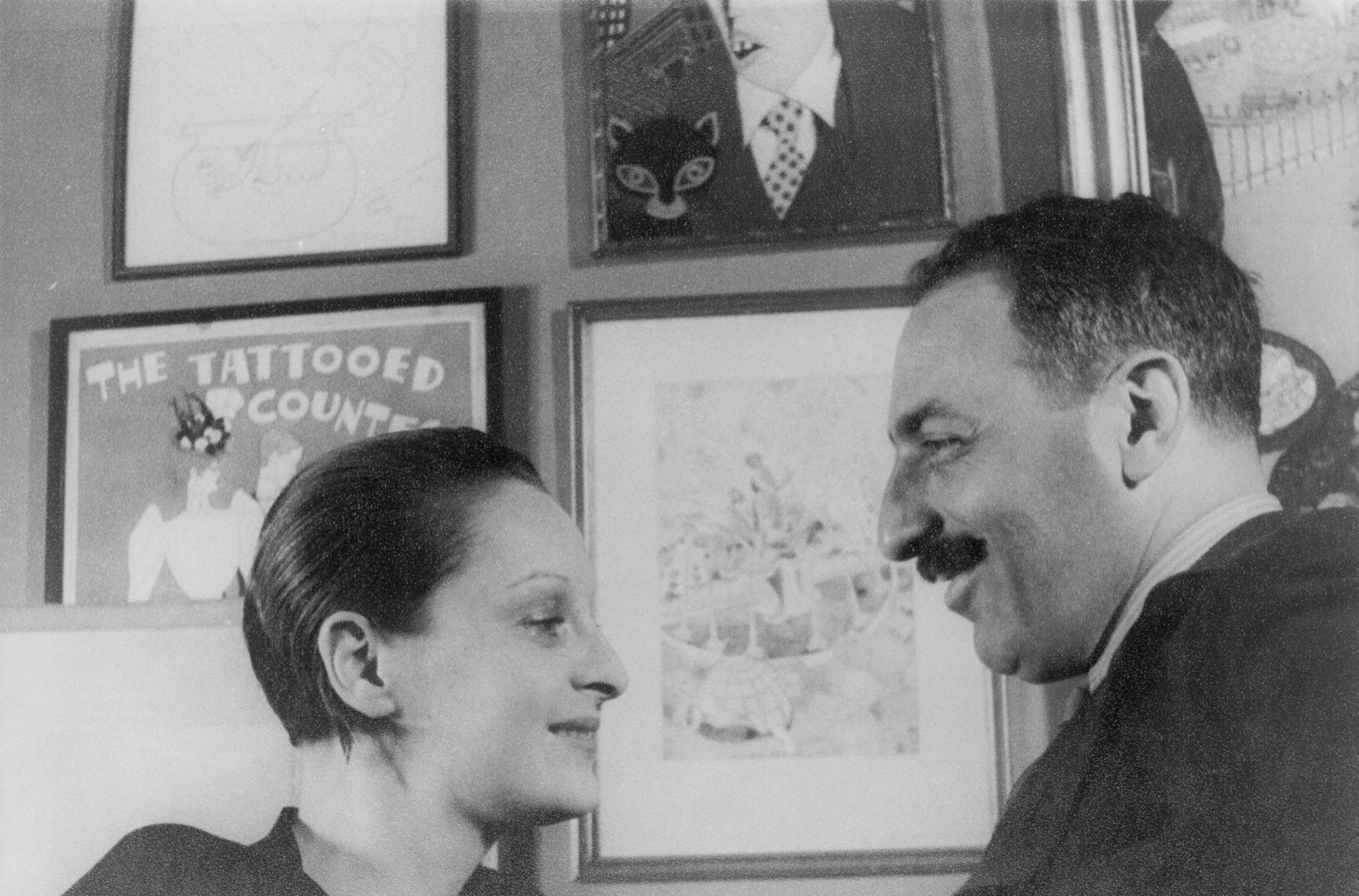
- Blanche Knopf (left) and Alfred A. Knopf Sr. photographed by Carl Van Vechten in 1932
- Born: Blanche Wolf; July 30, 1894; New York City, U.S.
- Died: June 4, 1966 (aged 71); U.S.
- Other name: Blanche Wolf Knopf
- Occupation: Publisher
- Spouse: Alfred A. Knopf Sr. (m. 1916)
- Children: Alfred A. Knopf Jr.

Blanche Wolf Knopf (July 30, 1894 – June 4, 1966) was an American book publisher who was the president of Alfred A. Knopf, Inc., and wife of Alfred A. Knopf Sr., with whom she established the firm in 1915. She traveled the world seeking new authors and was especially influential in the publication of European and Latin American literature in the United States.

== Early life and education ==
Blanche Wolf was born July 30, 1894, on the Upper West Side of New York City to a Jewish family; her parents were Julius and Bertha (née Samuels) Wolf. Blanche told others that Julius had been a jeweler in Vienna, but he had been a day laborer in Bavaria. After coming to America, he co-owned a millinery business (which he divested before it went bankrupt), and later, he owned the second-largest children's hat company in the country. Her mother, Bertha, was the daughter of Lehman Samuels, who co-owned Samuels Brothers, which was at one point the largest cattle exporter in America.

Blanche attended the Gardner School for Girls on the Upper East Side of New York City.

In 1911, she was introduced to Alfred A. Knopf Sr. at a party at the Lawrence Athletic Club in Lawrence, New York. Their relationship was built on their mutual interest in books. As Blanche Knopf said: "Alfred had realized I read books constantly and he had never met a girl who did.... I saw him and [all we did was] talk books, and nobody liked him — my family least of all. But I did, because I had someone to talk books to and we talked of making books.... We decided we would get married and make books and publish them." They were married on April 4, 1916, at the St. Regis Hotel in New York. Their first home, which they called Sans Souci (meaning carefree), was in Hartsdale, New York.

Their son, Alfred A. Knopf Jr., known as "Pat", was born on June 17, 1918. After Pat's birth, Blanche and Alfred moved back to Manhattan.

== Alfred A. Knopf, Inc. ==
Knopf launched Alfred A. Knopf, Inc. with Alfred Knopf in New York City in 1915. She learned the mechanics of printing and publishing and went on to become a highly influential editor. Knopf is credited with designing the Borzoi, a Russian wolfhound imprint marking Knopf titles. She became the company's vice president when it was incorporated in 1918. She often clashed with Alfred's father, Sam Knopf, who was named Treasurer when the firm was incorporated. Knopf became president of Alfred A. Knopf, Inc. in 1957 when Alfred Knopf became the chairman.

Knopf frequently traveled to Europe and Latin America to meet foreign authors and publishers. She is credited with recruiting Sigmund Freud, Albert Camus, André Gide, Jean-Paul Sartre, Simone de Beauvoir, Ilya Ehrenburg, Mikhail Sholokhov, Thomas Mann, and Gilberto Freyre, striking deals to publish translations of their works in the United States.

In 1936, Knopf returned from Europe concerned about the plight of German publishers and authors driven out of Germany because of Nazi persecution. Knopf told the reporter: "There's not a German writer left in Germany who is worth thinking about. The gifted writers and enterprising publishers who had any independence have all left Germany. Only Nazi writers and publishers remain. They write and publish to please the Nazi Government."

Thomas Mann called Blanche Knopf "the soul of the firm". Knopf is credited for advancing the careers of numerous authors, serving as an adviser while agreeing to publish the work of several influential authors. By the time she died, 27 Knopf authors had won the Pulitzer Prize and 16 the Nobel Prize.

Knopf also worked closely with many American writers, including John Updike, Carl Van Vechten, Willa Cather, H.L. Mencken, Raymond Chandler, Dashiell Hammett and Langston Hughes. Knopf helped Carl Van Vechten launch writers of the Harlem Renaissance, among whom were Langston Hughes and Nella Larson. According to her biography by Laura Claridge, Knopf "legitimized the genre of hard-boiled detective fiction" with authors such as Dashiell Hammett, Raymond Chandler and Ross Macdonald." Knopf was also responsible for acquiring William Shirer's Berlin Diary, John Hersey's Hiroshima and works by Edward R. Murrow.

Knopf started to lose her vision in her later years and, by the 1960s, was virtually blind. She died unexpectedly on June 4, 1966, in her sleep at her apartment in New York.

== Legacy ==
For her accomplishments in developing and promoting French literature, Knopf was named a Chevalier (Knight) of the Légion d'honneur by the French government in 1949 and became an Officier de la Légion d'honneur in 1960. She was also honored by Brazil with the Order of the Southern Cross.

She is the subject of a 2016 biography by Laura Claridge entitled The Lady with the Borzoi: Blanche Knopf, Literary Tastemaker Extraordinaire.

In the television series, Julia, based on the life of Julia Child, Knopf is portrayed by Judith Light.

=== Honors ===
- Chevalier de la Légion d'honneur, 1949, France
- Officier de la Légion d'honneur in 1960, France
- Order of the Southern Cross, Brazil
