= Alfred A. Knopf =

American publishing house

Alfred A. Knopf, Inc.
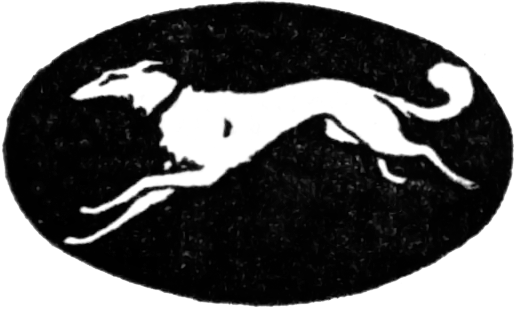
- Parent company: Penguin Random House
- Founded: 1915; 111 years ago
- Founder: Blanche Wolf Knopf and Alfred A. Knopf Sr.
- Country of origin: United States
- Headquarters location: New York City, U.S.
- Official website: knopfdoubleday.com/imprint/knopf/

Alfred A. Knopf, Inc. (/kənɒpf/) is an American publishing house that was founded by Blanche Knopf and Alfred A. Knopf Sr. in 1915. Blanche and Alfred traveled abroad regularly and were known for publishing European, Asian, and Latin American writers in addition to leading American literary trends. It was acquired by Random House in 1960, and is now part of the Knopf Doubleday Publishing Group division of Penguin Random House which is owned by the German conglomerate Bertelsmann.

The Knopf publishing house is associated with the borzoi logo in its colophon, which was designed by co-founder Blanche Knopf in 1925.

== History ==
=== Founding ===
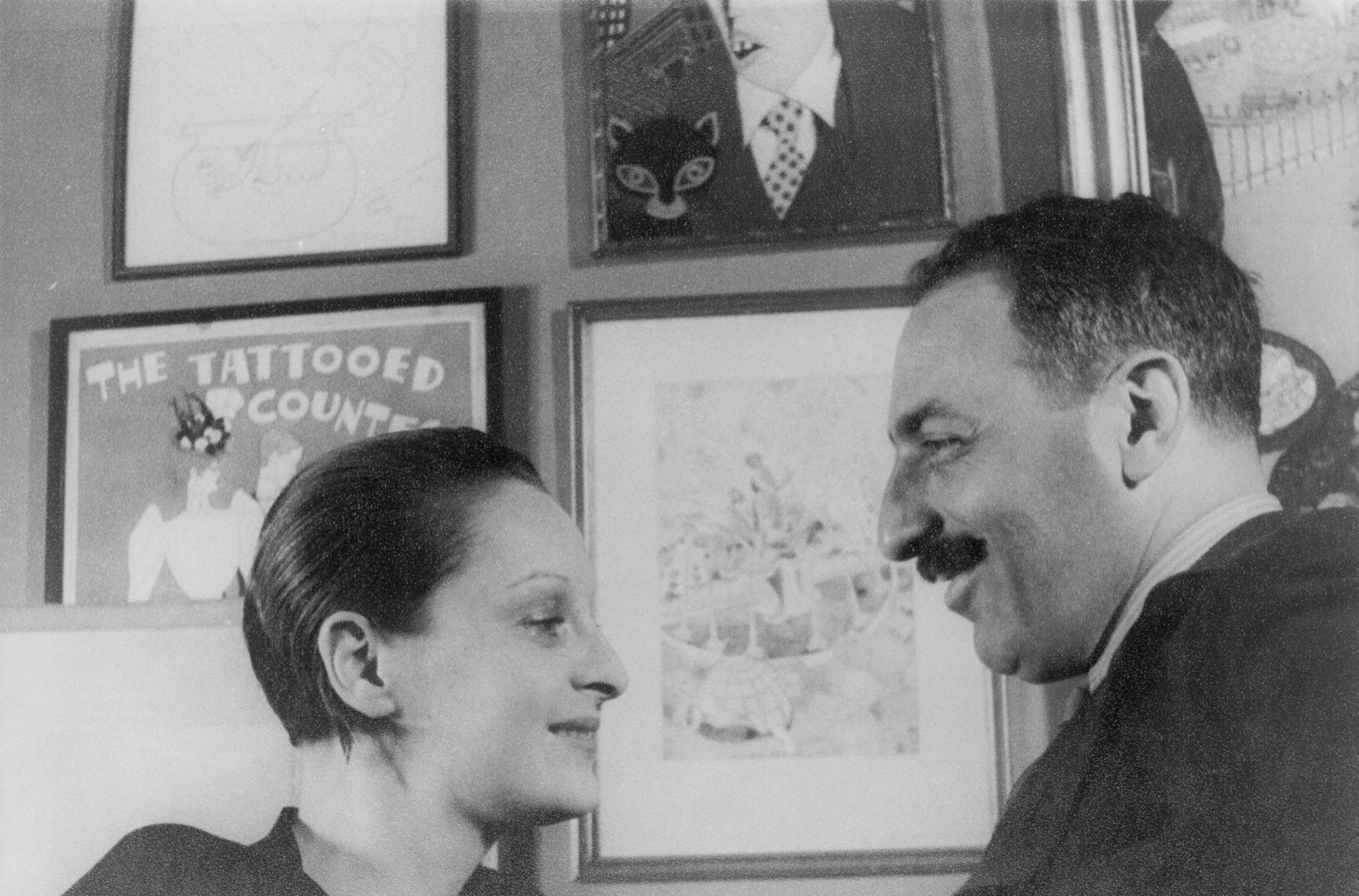
Portrait of Blanche Knopf and Alfred A. Knopf Sr. by Carl Van Vechten in 1932

Knopf was founded in 1915 by Alfred A. Knopf Sr. along with Blanche Knopf, on a $5,000 advance from his father, Samuel Knopf. The first office was located in New York's Candler Building. The publishing house was officially incorporated in 1918, with Alfred Knopf as president, Blanche Knopf as vice president, and Samuel Knopf as treasurer.

From the start, Knopf focused on European translations and high-brow works of literature. Among their initial publications were French author Émile Augier's Four Plays, Russian writer Nikolai Gogol's Taras Bulba, Polish novelist Stanisław Przybyszewski's novel Homo Sapiens, and French writer Guy de Maupassant's Yvette, a Novelette, and Ten Other Stories. During World War I these books were cheap to obtain and helped establish Knopf as an American firm publishing European works. Their first bestseller was a new edition of Green Mansions, a novel by W. H. Hudson which went through nine printings by 1919 and sold over 20,000 copies. Their first original American novel, The Three Black Pennys by Joseph Hergesheimer, was published in 1917.

==== 1920s ====
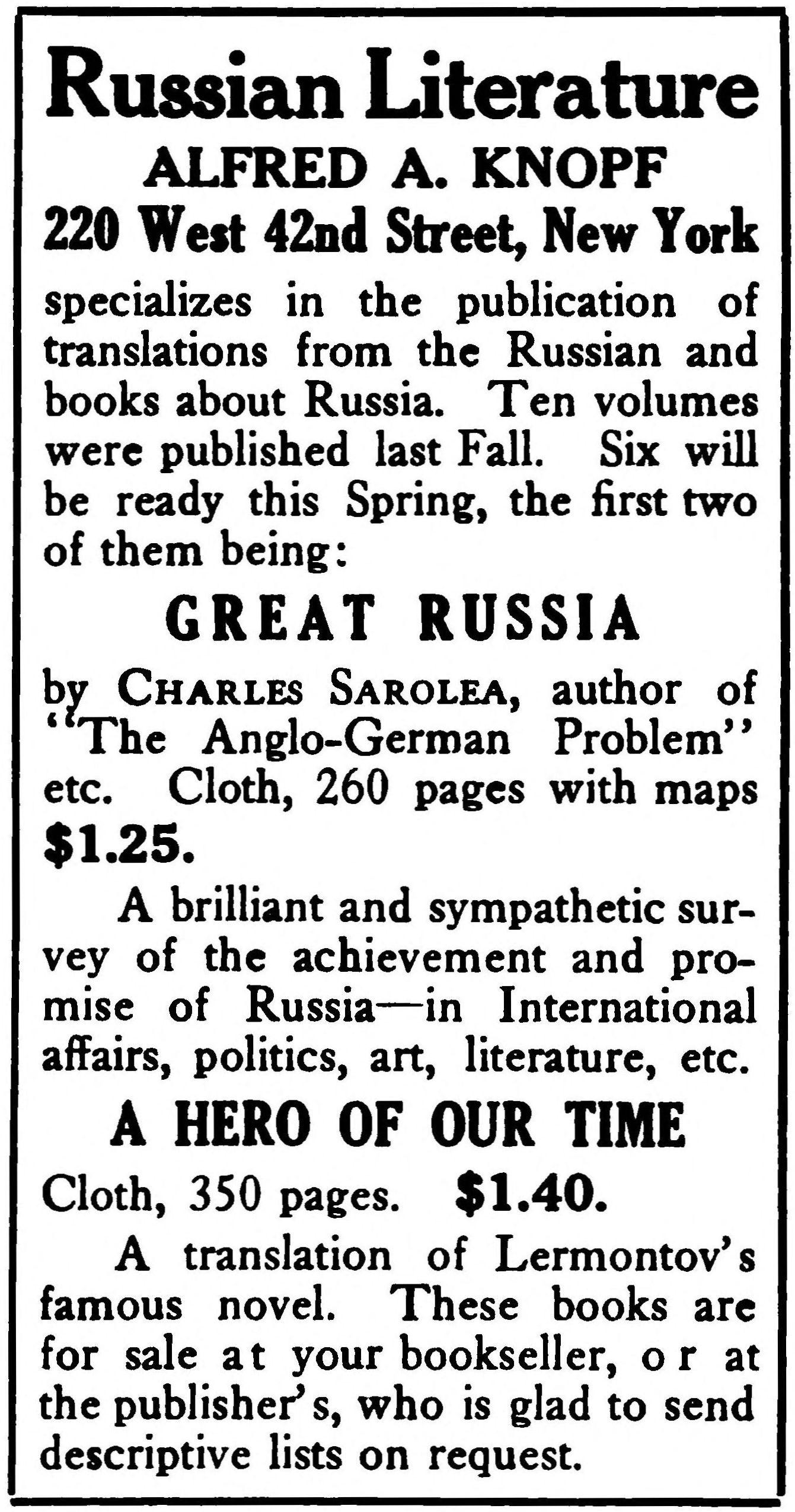
Advertisement by Knopf

With the start of the 1920s Knopf began using innovative advertising techniques to draw attention to their books and authors. Beginning in 1920, Knopf produced a chapbook for the purpose of promoting new books. The Borzoi was published periodically over the years, the first being a hardback called The Borzoi and sometimes quarterly as The Borzoi Quarterly. For Floyd Dell's coming-of-age novel, Moon-Calf, they paid men to walk the streets of the financial and theatre districts dressed in artist costumes with sandwich boards. The placards had a copy of the book for browsing and directed interested buyers to local book shops.

The unique look of their books along with their expertise in advertising their authors drew Willa Cather to leave her previous publisher Houghton Mifflin to join Alfred A. Knopf. As she was still under contract for her novels, the Knopfs suggested publishing a collection of her short stories, Youth and the Bright Medusa, in 1920. Cather was pleased with the results and the advertisement of the book in The New Republic and would go on to publish sixteen books with Knopf, including their first Pulitzer Prize winner, One of Ours.

Before they had married, Alfred had promised Blanche that they would be equal partners in the publishing company, but it was clear by the company's fifth anniversary that this was not to be the case. Knopf published a celebratory fifth-anniversary book in which Alfred was the focus of anecdotes by authors and Blanche's name was only mentioned once to note that "Mrs. Knopf" had found a manuscript. This despite ample evidence from authors and others that Blanche was in fact the soul of the company. This was covered extensively in The Lady with the Borzoi by Laura Claridge.

In 1923, Knopf also started publishing periodicals, beginning with The American Mercury, founded by H. L. Mencken and George Jean Nathan, which it published through 1934.

Also in 1923, Knopf published Kahlil Gibran's The Prophet. Knopf had published Gibran's earlier works which had disappointing sales. In its first year, The Prophet only sold 1,159 copies. It would double sales the next year and keep doubling becoming one of the firm's most successful books. In 1965 the book sold 240,000 copies. Approaching its 100 year anniversary in 2023, The Prophet has been translated into over 100 languages and has never gone out of print for Knopf.

In the 1920s, Knopf sometimes withdrew or censored their books when threatened by John Sumner, such as Floyd Dell's Janet March or George Egerton's 1899 translation of Hunger.

==== 1930s ====
Samuel Knopf died in 1932. William A. Koshland joined the company in 1934, and worked with the firm for more than fifty years, rising to take the positions of president and chairman of the board. Blanche became president in 1957 when Alfred became chairman of the board, and worked steadily for the firm until her death in 1966. Alfred Knopf retired in 1972, becoming chairman emeritus of the firm until his death in 1984. Alfred Knopf also had a summer home in Purchase, New York.

==== 1940s ====
Following the Good Neighbor policy, Blanche Knopf visited South America in 1942, so the firm could start producing texts from there. She was one of the first publishers to visit Europe after World War II. Her trips, and those of other editors, brought in new writers from Europe, South America, and Asia. Alfred traveled to Brazil in 1961, which spurred a corresponding interest on his part in South America. Penn Publishing Company was acquired in 1943. The Knopfs' son, Alfred "Pat" Jr., was hired on as secretary and trade books manager after the war.

==== 1950s ====
In 1957, editor Judith Jones joined Knopf. Jones, who had discovered Anne Frank: Diary of a Young Girl while working at Doubleday, acquired Simone Beck, Louisette Bertholle and Julia Child's Mastering the Art of French Cooking for Knopf. Jones would remain with Knopf, retiring in 2011 as a senior editor and vice-president after a career that included working with John Updike and Anne Tyler.

Pat Knopf left his parents' publishing company in 1959 to launch his own, Atheneum Publishers, with two other partners. The story made the front page of The New York Times.

In a 1957 advertisement in The Atlantic Monthly, Alfred A. Knopf published the Borzoi Credo. The credo includes a list of what Knopf's beliefs for publishing including the statement that he never published an unworthy book. Among a list of beliefs listed is the final one—"I believe that magazines, movies, television, and radio will never replace good books."

=== Acquisition by Random House ===
In 1960, Random House acquired Alfred A. Knopf. It is believed that the decision to sell was prompted by Alfred A. Knopf Jr., leaving Knopf to found his own book company, Atheneum Books, in 1959.

Since its founding, Knopf has paid close attention to design and typography, employing notable designers and typographers including William Addison Dwiggins, Harry Ford, Steven Heller, Chip Kidd, Lorraine Louie, Peter Mendelsund, Bruce Rogers, Rudolf Ruzicka, and Beatrice Warde. Knopf books conclude with an unnumbered page titled "A Note on the Type", which describes the history of the typeface used for the book. In addition, Knopf books date the year of the book's current printing on the title page.

Knopf published textbooks until 1988, when Random House's schools and colleges division was sold to McGraw Hill.

In 1991, Knopf revived the "Everyman's Library" series, originally published in England in the early 20th century. This series consists of classics of world literature in affordable hardcover editions. The series has grown over the years to include lines of Children's Classics and Pocket Poets.

Random House was acquired by Bertelsmann AG in 1998. In late 2008 and early 2009, the Knopf Publishing Group merged with Doubleday to form the Knopf Doubleday Publishing Group. Random House has been owned since its 2013 merger of Penguin Group by Penguin Random House, a joint venture between Bertelsmann (53%) and Pearson PLC (47%).

Many of Knopf's hardcover books are published later as Vintage paperbacks. Vintage Books is a sister imprint of Random House.

In October 2012, Bertelsmann entered into talks with rival conglomerate Pearson plc, over the possibility of combining their respective publishing companies, Random House and Penguin Group. The merger was completed on 1 July 2013 and the new company is Penguin Random House. Bertelsmann owned 53% of the joint venture while Pearson owned 47%. At the time of the acquisition the combined companies controlled 25% of the book business, with more than 10,000 employees and 250 independent publishing imprints and with about $3.9 billion in annual revenues. The move to consolidate was to provide leverage against Amazon.com and battle the shrinking state of bookstores.

In 2015, Knopf celebrated its 100th anniversary by publishing a commemorative book, Alfred A. Knopf, 1915–2015: A Century of Publishing.

== People ==
=== Editors and publishers ===
While there have been many notable editors at Knopf there have only been four editors-in-chief: Alfred A. Knopf, Sr., Robert Gottlieb, Sonny Mehta (who died in 2019) and Jordan Pavlin. Other influential editors at Knopf included Harold Strauss (Japanese literature), Herbert Weinstock (biography of musical composers), Judith Jones (translations, The Diary of Anne Frank, culinary texts), Peter Mendelsund (art director and book cover designer) as well as Bobbie Bristol, Angus Cameron, Ann Close, Charles Elliott, Gary Fisketjon, Lee Goerner, Ashbel Green, Carol Brown Janeway, Michael Magzis, Anne McCormick, Nancy Nicholas, Daniel Okrent, Regina Ryan, Sophie Wilkins, and Victoria Wilson. Knopf also employed literary scouts to good advantage.

=== Authors ===
Alfred A. Knopf has published books by many notable authors, including James Baldwin, John Banville, Carl Bernstein, Elizabeth Bowen, Frederick Buechner, Albert Camus, Robert Caro, Willa Cather, John Cheever, Julia Child, Bill Clinton, Michael Crichton, Miguel Covarrubias, Don DeLillo, Joan Didion, Bret Easton Ellis, James Ellroy, Martin Gardner, Kahlil Gibran, Lee H. Hamilton, Kazuo Ishiguro, John Keegan, Nella Larsen, John le Carré, Jack London, Gabriel García Márquez, Cormac McCarthy, Toni Morrison, Alice Munro, Haruki Murakami, Cynthia Ozick, Christopher Paolini, Edgar Allan Poe, Ezra Pound, Anne Rice, Dorothy Richardson, Stephen M. Silverman, Oswald Spengler, Susan Swan, Donna Tartt, Barbara W. Tuchman, Anne Tyler, John Updike, Andrew Vachss, James D. Watson, and Elinor Wylie.

== Awards ==
Year	Award	Category	Title	Author
2013	Pulitzer Prize	Poetry	Stag's Leap	Sharon Olds
2011	Pulitzer Prize	Fiction	A Visit from the Goon Squad	Jennifer Egan
2010	Pulitzer Prize	Biography or Autobiography	The First Tycoon	T. J. Stiles
2007	Pulitzer Prize	Fiction	The Road	Cormac McCarthy
2005	MHA Best Book Award	History	Joseph Smith: Rough Stone Rolling	Richard Bushman
2005	Pulitzer Prize	Biography or Autobiography	de Kooning: An American Master	Mark Stevens and Annalyn Swan
2004	Pulitzer Prize	Poetry	Walking to Martha's Vineyard	Franz Wright
2003	Newbery Honor	Fiction	Hoot	Carl Hiaasen
2003	Pulitzer Prize	Biography or Autobiography	Master of the Senate	Robert A. Caro
2002	Pulitzer Prize	Fiction	Empire Falls	Richard Russo
2001	Pulitzer Prize	History	Founding Brothers	Joseph J. Ellis
1999	Pulitzer Prize	Poetry	Blizzard of One	Mark Strand
1998	Pulitzer Prize	Biography or Autobiography	Personal History	Katharine Graham
1997	Pulitzer Prize	History	Original Meanings	Jack N. Rakove
1996	Pulitzer Prize	Fiction	Independence Day	Richard Ford
1996	Pulitzer Prize	Biography or Autobiography	God: A Biography	Jack Miles
1996	Pulitzer Prize	History	William Cooper's Town	Alan Taylor
1995	Pulitzer Prize	Poetry	The Simple Truth	Philip Levine
1995	Pulitzer Prize	General Nonfiction	The Beak of the Finch	Jonathan Weiner
1993	Pulitzer Prize	History	The Radicalism of the American Revolution	Gordon S. Wood
1992	Pulitzer Prize	Fiction	A Thousand Acres	Jane Smiley
1991	Pulitzer Prize	History	A Midwife's Tale	Laurel Thatcher Ulrich
1991	Pulitzer Prize	Fiction	Rabbit at Rest	John Updike
1991	Pulitzer Prize	Poetry	Near Changes	Mona Van Duyn
1989	Pulitzer Prize	Biography or Autobiography	Oscar Wilde	Richard Ellmann
1989	Pulitzer Prize	Fiction	Breathing Lessons	Anne Tyler
1988	Pulitzer Prize	History	The Launching of Modern American Science, 1846-1876	Robert V. Bruce
1988	Pulitzer Prize	Fiction	Beloved	Toni Morrison
1987	Pulitzer Prize	History	Voyagers to the West	Bernard Bailyn
1987	Pulitzer Prize	Fiction	A Summons to Memphis	Peter Taylor
1986	Pulitzer Prize	Biography or Autobiography	Louise Bogan	Elizabeth Frank
1986	Pulitzer Prize	General Nonfiction	Common Ground	J. Anthony Lukas
1982	Pulitzer Prize	Fiction	Rabbit Is Rich	John Updike
1981	Pulitzer Prize	Biography or Autobiography	Peter the Great	Robert K. Massie
1981	Pulitzer Prize	General Nonfiction	Fin-de-Siècle Vienna	Carl E. Schorske
1980	Pulitzer Prize	History	Been In the Storm So Long	Leon F. Litwack
1979	Pulitzer Prize	Fiction	The Stories of John Cheever	John Cheever
1975	Pulitzer Prize	Biography or Autobiography	The Power Broker: Robert Moses and the Fall of New York	Robert A. Caro
1973	Pulitzer Prize	History	People of Paradox	Michael Kammen
1970	Pulitzer Prize	Biography or Autobiography	Huey Long	T. Harry Williams
1967	Pulitzer Prize	History	Exploration and Empire	William H. Goetzmann
1965	Pulitzer Prize	Fiction	The Keepers of the House	Shirley Ann Grau
1964	Pulitzer Prize	General Nonfiction	Anti-Intellectualism in American Life	Richard Hofstadter
1962	Pulitzer Prize	History	The Triumphant Empire: Thunder-Clouds Gather in the West	Lawrence H. Gipson
1961	Pulitzer Prize	Biography or Autobiography	Charles Sumner and the Coming of the Civil War	David Herbert Donald
1960	Pulitzer Prize	Poetry	Heart's Needle	W. D. Snodgrass
1956	Pulitzer Prize	History	The Age of Reform	Richard Hofstadter
1955	Pulitzer Prize	History	Collected Poems: Wallace Stevens	Wallace Stevens
1951	Pulitzer Prize	Fiction	The Town	Conrad Richter
1950	Pulitzer Prize	Biography or Autobiography	John Quincy Adams and the Foundations of American Foreign Policy	Samuel Flagg Bemis
1946	Pulitzer Prize	Biography or Autobiography	Son of the Wilderness	Linnie Marsh Wolfe
1945	Pulitzer Prize	Novel	A Bell for Adano	John Hersey
1945	Pulitzer Prize	Biography or Autobiography	George Bancroft: Brahmin Rebel	Russel Blaine Nye
1944	Pulitzer Prize	Biography or Autobiography	The American Leonardo: A Life of Samuel F. B. Morse	Carleton Mabee
1934	Pulitzer Prize	Poetry	Collected Verse	Robert Hillyer
1927	Pulitzer Prize	Poetry	Fiddler's Farewell	Leonora Speyer
1923	Pulitzer Prize	Novel	One of Ours	Willa Cather
2009	National Book Award	Nonfiction	The First Tycoon	T. J. Stiles
2005	National Book Award	Nonfiction	The Year of Magical Thinking	Joan Didion
2002	National Book Award	Nonfiction	Master of the Senate	Robert A. Caro
1997	National Book Award	Nonfiction	American Sphinx The Character of Thomas Jefferson	Joseph J. Ellis
1991	National Book Award	Nonfiction	How We Die	Sherwin B. Nuland
1992	National Book Award	Fiction	All the Pretty Horses	Cormac McCarthy
1991	National Book Award	Poetry	What Work Is	Philip Levine
1989	National Book Award	Fiction	Spartina	John Casey
1985	National Book Award	Nonfiction	Common Ground	J. Anthony Lukas
1983	National Book Award	History	Voices of Protest	Alan Brinkley
1982	National Book Award	Fiction	Rabbit is Rich	John Updike
1981	National Book Award	First Novel	Sister Wolf	Ann Arensberg
1981	National Book Award	Fiction Paperback	The Stories of John Cheever	John Cheever
1981	National Book Award	General Nonfiction	China Men	Maxine Hong Kingston
1981	National Book Award	History Paperback	Been in the Storm So Long	Leon F. Litwack
1980	National Book Award	Autobiography (Hardcover)	By Myself	Lauren Bacall
1980	National Book Award	Current Interest (Hardcover)	Julia Child and More Company	Julia Child
1980	National Book Award	History (Paperback)	A Distant Mirror	Barbara W. Tuchman
1980	National Book Award	First Novel	Birdy	William Wharton
1977	National Book Award	Contemporary Thought	The Uses of Enchantment	Bruno Bettelheim
1976	National Book Award	Fiction	J R	William Gaddis
1975	National Book Award	Contemporary Affairs	All God's Dangers	Theodore Rosengarten
1974	National Book Award	Biography	Macaulay	John Clive
1972	National Book Award	Poetry	The Collected Works of Frank O'Hara	Frank O'Hara
1970	National Book Award	History and Biography	Huey Long	T. Harry Williams
1967	National Book Award	History and Biography	The Enlightenment, Vol. 1	Peter Gay
1964	National Book Award	Fiction	The Centaur	John Updike
1962	National Book Award	Fiction	The Moviegoer	Walker Percy
1961	National Book Award	Fiction	The Waters of Kronos	Conrad Richter
1955	National Book Award	Poetry	The Collected Poems of Wallace Stevens	Wallace Stevens
1951	National Book Award	Poetry	The Auroras of Autumn	Wallace Stevens
2017	Nobel Prize	Literature	Nobel Prize in Literature	Kazuo Ishiguro
2013	Nobel Prize	Literature	Nobel Prize in Literature	Alice Munro
2007	Nobel Prize	Literature	Nobel Prize in Literature	Doris Lessing
2006	Nobel Prize	Literature	Nobel Prize in Literature	Orhan Pamuk
2002	Nobel Prize	Literature	Nobel Prize in Literature	Imre Kertész
2001	Nobel Prize	Literature	Nobel Prize in Literature	V.S. Naipaul
1999	Nobel Prize	Literature	Nobel Prize in Literature	Günter Grass
1993	Nobel Prize	Literature	Nobel Prize in Literature	Toni Morrison
1991	Nobel Prize	Literature	Nobel Prize in Literature	Nadine Gordimer
1982	Nobel Prize	Literature	Nobel Prize in Literature	Gabriel García Márquez
1980	Nobel Prize	Literature	Nobel Prize in Literature	Czeslaw Milosz
1972	Nobel Prize	Literature	Nobel Prize in Literature	Heinrich Boll
1968	Nobel Prize	Literature	Nobel Prize in Literature	Yasunari Kawabata
1965	Nobel Prize	Literature	Nobel Prize in Literature	Mikhail Sholokhov
1964	Nobel Prize	Literature	Nobel Prize in Literature	Jean-Paul Sartre (declined)
1961	Nobel Prize	Literature	Nobel Prize in Literature	Ivo Andrić
1957	Nobel Prize	Literature	Nobel Prize in Literature	Albert Camus
1955	Nobel Prize	Literature	Nobel Prize in Literature	Halldor K. Laxness
1947	Nobel Prize	Literature	Nobel Prize in Literature	André Gide
1944	Nobel Prize	Literature	Nobel Prize in Literature	Johannes V. Jensen
1939	Nobel Prize	Literature	Nobel Prize in Literature	Frans E. Sillanpaa
1929	Nobel Prize	Literature	Nobel Prize in Literature	Thomas Mann
1928	Nobel Prize	Literature	Nobel Prize in Literature	Sigrid Undset
1924	Nobel Prize	Literature	Nobel Prize in Literature	Wladyslaw S. Reymont
1920	Nobel Prize	Literature	Nobel Prize in Literature	Knut Hamsun
1916	Nobel Prize	Literature	Nobel Prize in Literature	Verner von Heidenstam

== Logo ==
The logo for Knopf is a Russian wolfhound or Borzoi. Blanche Knopf suggested the Borzoi for the logo to imply motion and the logo was used on both the spine and the title page of their books.
