= The Princess Mouse: A Tale of Finland =

2003 book by Aaron Shepard

- Book cover
- Author: Aaron Shepard
- Illustrator: Leonid Gore
- Cover artist: Leonid Gore
- Language: English
- Genre: Adventure; Fantasy; Picture book
- Publisher: Atheneum Books
- Publication date: February 1, 2003
- Publication place: United States
- Media type: Print (hardcover and paperback)
- Pages: 32
- ISBN: 978-0689829123

The Princess Mouse: A Tale of Finland is a 2003 American children's picture book written by Aaron Shepard and illustrated by Leonid Gore, published by Atheneum Books. It is based on "The Forest Bride" from Parker Fillmore's Mighty Mikko: A Book of Finnish Fairy Tales and Folk Tales (1922) and "The Mouse Bride" from James Cloyd Bowman and Margery Bianco's Tales from a Finnish Tupa (1940).

== Plot ==
A farmer instructs his two sons to select brides according to family tradition: each must fell a tree and follow the direction in which it points until finding a prospective sweetheart. The elder son, already enamored of a neighboring farmer's daughter, skillfully directs his tree toward her home and secures her agreement. The younger son, Mikko, lacking a preferred candidate, allows his tree to fall toward the forest; despite his brother's mockery, he proceeds into the woods. Deep in the forest, Mikko discovers an empty cottage inhabited solely by a small mouse. The mouse declares herself his sweetheart, demonstrating velvet-like fur and singing endearing verses. Though initially hesitant, Mikko accepts her, describing her to his family as wearing a velvet gown like a princess.

To test the brides, the farmer requires each to weave cloth. The elder son's fiancée produces sturdy, serviceable linen. The mouse, after lulling Mikko to sleep with a lullaby, summons hundreds of mice via a sleigh bell; they collectively gather flax, spin yarn, and weave extraordinarily fine linen, which she presents folded inside a nutshell. The farmer deems Mikko's cloth superior but approves both brides, decreeing that they be brought home the following day for weddings. Mikko, distressed at the prospect of public ridicule, nevertheless affirms his affection for the mouse. She arrives in a miniature carriage fashioned from a nutshell, drawn by rats and attended by mouse servants.

At the wedding site by a stream, the elder brother disdainfully kicks the carriage into the water, seemingly dooming the mouse. As Mikko grieves, the submerged carriage transforms: it emerges as a full-sized vehicle drawn by horses, containing a beautiful princess in a damp velvet gown. She reveals that a witch's enchantment had transformed her into a mouse, breakable only when one brother sought to marry her and another to kill her. With the spell lifted, she and Mikko wed in splendor. The cottage becomes a castle, where they reside happily. The elder brother, though jealous, marries his chosen bride without further incident. The narrator implies that any sons of Mikko and the princess would perpetuate the tree-felling tradition for selecting spouses.

== Reception ==
The Princess Mouse received mostly good reviews. Kirkus Reviews found it "prettily told, with sweet lessons about love and trust, no matter how odd the circumstances", while Publishers Weekly wrote that "magical events and a moral dilemma give this Finnish tale its staying power" and "Gore's (Sleeping Boy) distinctively angled figures, drawn in pastel on rough paper, deepen the story's folktale feel". Inis magazine was critical, writing: "Perhaps I am being too hard on this book, but I really do not think that this retelling has any particular merits. It is badly written, poorly illustrated and totally uninspiring. As regards the song at the back, I can't say that I wanted to sing it!" The Bulletin of the Center for Children's Books asserted that "although there is little tension in the plot, the marital preparations of characters human and rodent are appealingly handled, and the tone of the text itself is successfully humorous" and called it a "cozy adaptation". Booklist wrote that "Shepard's charmingly droll version of a Finnish folktale combines classic elements with unexpected, witty details" and "the jewel-toned art has beautiful luminescence; the elongated, somewhat blocky look of the characters reinforces the fantasy; and the mice are downright irresistible". School Library Journal called novel "a pleasant, attractive addition to folklore shelves", while Horn Book found it a "well-told tale".
