= Lorraine Louie =

American book designer (1955–1999)

Lorraine Louie (October 14, 1955 - November 20, 1999) was an American graphic designer.

Louie was born in San Francisco, California. She attended Lowell High School and later graduated from the California College of Arts & Crafts with a degree in Graphic Design. In 1982, she relocated to New York City to advance her career in graphic design.

She worked on book cover designs for prominent publishers such as Random House, Knopf, Atlantic Monthly, and Ecco Press. She designed covers for such books as Ellen Foster, Bright Lights, Big City, and The Joy Luck Club and developed the format for the Vintage Contemporary series of paperback books. Her work has been featured in Newsweek and Esquire magazines, as well as in trade publications like How and Print.

She is included in "A History of Graphic Design" by Phil Meggs. Additionally, she contributed her design expertise to charitable causes, creating posters for fundraising events such as Taste of Tribeca, which supports local public schools.

Louie died from breast cancer at the age of 44.
