= Atheneum Books =

New York City publishing house

- Parent company: Simon & Schuster
- Founded: 1959
- Founder: Alfred A. Knopf Jr., Simon Michael Bessie and Hiram Haydn
- Country of origin: United States
- Headquarters location: New York City
- Publication types: Books
- Fiction genres: Children's literature
- Imprints: Caitlyn Dlouhy Books
- Owner: Kohlberg Kravis Roberts
- Official website: simonandschusterpublishing.com/atheneum/

Atheneum Books is a New York City publishing house established in 1959 by Alfred A. Knopf Jr., Simon Michael Bessie and Hiram Haydn. Simon & Schuster has owned Atheneum properties since 1994, and it created Atheneum Books for Young Readers as an imprint for children's literature in the 2000s.

== History ==
Alfred A. Knopf Jr. left his family publishing house Alfred A. Knopf and created Atheneum Books in 1959 with Simon Michael Bessie (Harpers) and Hiram Haydn (Random House). (Note: Detailed description of how Atheneum Publishers came into existence is described in Hiram Haydn's memoir: Words & Faces: An Intimate Chronicle of Book and Magazine Publishing (Harcourt Brace Jovanovich, 1974), pp. 105–40.) It became the publisher of Pulitzer Prize winners Edward Albee, Charles Johnson, James Merrill, Nikki Giovanni, Mona Van Duyn, Robert K. Massie, and Theodore H. White. It also published Ernest Gaines' first book Catherine Carmier (1964). Knopf recruited editor Jean E. Karl to establish a Children's Book Department in 1961. Atheneum acquired the reprint house Russell & Russell in 1965.

Atheneum merged with Charles Scribner's Sons to become The Scribner Book Company in 1978. The acquisition included Rawson Associates. Scribner was acquired by Macmillan in 1984. Macmillan was purchased by Simon & Schuster in 1994. After the merger, the Atheneum adult list was merged into Scribner and the Scribner children's line was merged into Atheneum.

In the 2000s, the Simon & Schuster imprint Atheneum Books for Young Readers published the popular May Bird fantasy series for young adults, inaugurated by May Bird and the Ever After (2005), and the Olivia series of picture books featuring Olivia the pig (from 2000). The Higher Power of Lucky won the 2007 Newbery Medal. In a 2007 online poll, the National Education Association listed Bunnicula: A Rabbit-Tale of Mystery as one of its Teachers' Top 100 Books for Children.

== Publications ==
- Nicholas and Alexandra: An Intimate Account of the Last of the Romanovs and the Fall of Imperial Russia (1967)
- The Princess Mouse: A Tale of Finland (2003)
- Those Who Prey (2020)
