= Leon Litwack =

American historian (1929–2021)

- Born: Leon Frank Litwack; December 2, 1929; Santa Barbara, California, U.S.
- Died: August 5, 2021 (aged 91); Berkeley, California, U.S.
- Known for: African American history, race relations in the United States; labor activism
- Spouse: Rhoda (Goldberg) Litwack
- Children: 2, Ann, John
- Awards: National Book Award for Nonfiction, Pulitzer Prize for History, Francis Parkman Prize, Golden Apple Award for Outstanding Teaching

Academic background
- Education: University of California, Berkeley
- Academic advisor: Kenneth M. Stampp
- Influences: W. E. B. Du Bois

Academic work
- Discipline: History
- Institutions: University of California, Berkeley

Leon Frank Litwack (December 2, 1929 – August 5, 2021) was an American historian whose scholarship focused on slavery, the Reconstruction Era of the United States, and its aftermath into the 20th century. He won a National Book Award, the Pulitzer Prize for History, and the Francis Parkman Prize for his 1979 book Been In the Storm So Long: The Aftermath of Slavery. He also received a Guggenheim Fellowship.

After the spring 2007 semester he retired to emeritus status at the University of California, Berkeley, where he received the Golden Apple Award for Outstanding Teaching that year. Then he went on a lecture tour that led to his latest book, How Free Is Free? The Long Death of Jim Crow (2009).

== Biography ==
Litwack was born in Santa Barbara, California, in 1929, the son of Ukrainian Jewish immigrants Minnie (Manie Nitkin), from Boslov, and Julius Litwack, from Golta. His parents had emigrated separately from the Russia Empire in the first decade of the 20th century and met in San Francisco. He received his BA in 1951 and PhD in 1958 from UC Berkeley. He taught at UC Berkeley and also at the University of Wisconsin, University of South Carolina, Louisiana State University and Colorado College.

Litwack's interest in history was sparked by The Growth of the American Republic, by Samuel Eliot Morison and Henry Steele Commager (1930). Litwack said,

The textbook was my first confrontation with history. I asked my 11th grade teacher for the opportunity to respond to the textbook's version of Reconstruction, to what I thought were distortions and racial biases. (I had already read Howard Fast's Freedom Road.) The research led me to the library—and to W. E. B. Du Bois's Black Reconstruction, with that intriguing subtitle: An Essay Toward a History of the Part which Black Folk Played in the Attempt to Reconstruct Democracy in America, 1860–1880. Armed with that book, I presented what I thought to be a persuasive rebuttal of the textbook.

Historian Michael Les Benedict wrote that in 1961 "Leon Litwack showed how the federal government's pervasive support for slavery led to shameful treatment of free African Americans." Benedict was referring to pages 30–63 of chapter 2, titled "The Federal Government and the Free Negro" in Litwack's book, North of Slavery: The Negro in the Free States, 1790-1860.

From 1964 to 2007, Litwack taught more than 30,000 students at UC Berkeley, where he became the Alexander F. and May T. Morrison Professor of American History. For much of that time he taught History 7B, Berkeley's introductory survey course in post-Civil War American history. He delivered his final lecture as a professor, "Fight the Power", on Monday, May 7, 2007, in Wheeler Auditorium.

Litwack was elected to the presidency of the Organization of American Historians. An enormously popular and influential teacher, he was profiled in Newsweek's 2006 edition of the "Giving Back Awards", having been nominated by one of his former students. He has received two distinguished teaching awards. Litwack was presented with the Golden Apple Award for Outstanding Teaching in 2007 by the Associated Students of the University of California.

With a (National Endowment for the Humanities) NEH Film Grant, he produced To Look for America in 1971.

Been in the Storm So Long was a groundbreaking book on Reconstruction, published in 1979. It won the annual Pulitzer Prize for History and Francis Parkman Prize; next year its first paperback edition won a National Book Award. (Note: This was the 1981 award for paperback History. From 1980 to 1983 in National Book Award history there were dual hardcover and paperback awards in most categories, and several nonfiction subcategories including General Nonfiction. Most of the paperback award-winners were reprints, including this one.)

Years later he continued the investigation of race relations to the early 20th century with Trouble in Mind (1998). In turn, the sequel to Trouble is How Free Is Free?: The Long Death of Jim Crow (The Nathan I. Huggins Lectures), which focuses on black southerners and race relations from the 1930s to 1955.

A distinguished lecturer with the Organization of American Historians, Litwack lectured on these topics:

- Pearl Harbor Blues: Black Americans and World War II
- Trouble in Mind: African Americans and Race Reflections from Reconstruction to the Civil Rights Movement
- On Becoming a Historian
- To Look for America: From Hiroshima to Woodstock (an impressionistic multi-media examination of American society, with an introductory lecture on American society after 1945)
- Fight the Power: Black Americans and Race Relations after the Civil Rights Movement

Litwack died of bladder cancer on August 5, 2021, in Berkeley.

== Selected works ==
Books

- North of Slavery: The Negro in the Free States, 1790-1860 (University of Chicago Press, 1961)
- The American Labor Movement by Leon Litwack (1962) ISBN 0-671-62827-5
- Been in the Storm So Long: The Aftermath of Slavery. (1979) — winner of the National Book Award and the Pulitzer Prize for History
- Trouble In Mind: Black Southerners in the Age of Jim Crow (Alfred A. Knopf, 1998)
- Without Sanctuary: Lynching Photography in America, edited by Hilton Als, Jon Lewis, Leon F. Litwack and James Allen (Twin Palms Publishers, 2000) ISBN 0-944092-69-1
- The Harvard Guide to African-American History, edited by Evelyn Brooks Higginbotham, Darlene Clark Hine and Leon F. Litwack (Harvard Univ Press, 2001) ISBN 0-674-00276-8 — compiles information and interpretations on the past 500 years of African American history, containing essays on historical research aids, bibliographies, resources for women's issues, and an accompanying CD-ROM providing bibliographical entries
- How Free Is Free?: The Long Death of Jim Crow. The Nathan I. Huggins Lectures (Harvard University Press, 2009) ISBN 978-0-674-03152-4

Articles

- "The Blues Keep Falling", in Ethnic Notions: Black Images in the White Mind (Berkeley Art Center, 1982).
- "Hellhound on My Trail: Race Relations in the South from Reconstruction to the Civil Rights Movement", in Opening Doors: Perspectives on Race Relations in Contemporary America (Tuscaloosa: University of Alabama Press, 1991), 3–25.
- "Telling the Story: The Historian, the Film Maker, and the Civil War", in Robert B. Toplin (ed.), Ken Burns' Civil War: The Historians' Response (Oxford University Press, 1995).
- "The Making of a Historian", in Paul A. Cimbala and Robert F. Himmelberg, Historians and Race: Autobiography and the Writing of History (Bloomington, 1996).
- "Pearl Harbor Blues", Regards Croises Sur Les Afro-Américains / Cross Perspective on African Americans (University of Tours, France, 2003), 303–318.

Film

- To Look for America (1971)
