= Robert B. Semple Jr. =

American journalist (born 1936)

Robert B. Semple Jr. (born August 12, 1936, in St. Louis, Missouri) is the associate editor of The New York Times editorial page, and a Pulitzer Prize-winning journalist.

Semple was raised in Michigan and educated at Andover, and Yale University, where he was Chairman of the Yale Daily News and was elected to Elihu, a senior society. Semple subsequently received an M.A. in history from the University of California, Berkeley in 1961.

In the fall of 1963, he joined the Washington bureau of The New York Times, covering housing and civil rights stories during the Johnson administration. Semple spent a year covering President Johnson himself, and served as White House correspondent during Richard Nixon's first term in office. He served thereafter as deputy national editor (1973–75), London bureau chief (1975–77), foreign editor (1977–82), editor of the Op-Ed Page (1982–88) and associate editor of the Editorial Page (1988 to present). Semple received the Pulitzer Prize in 1996 for his editorials on environmental issues, including his editorials about a proposed mine that would have been built on the edge of Yellowstone National Park.
