= Joseph Ellis =

American historian (born 1943)

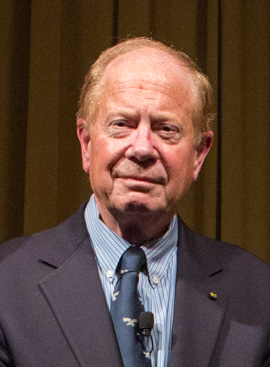
- Ellis in 2016
- Born: Joseph John Ellis; July 18, 1943 (age 83); Alexandria, Virginia, U.S.
- Education: College of William and Mary (BA); Yale University (MA, PhD)
- Occupations: Professor, writer
- Writing career
- Genre: History
- Subject: Early American history
- Notable work: Founding Brothers: The Revolutionary Generation
- Website: www.josephellishistorian.com

Joseph John-Michael Ellis III (born July 18, 1943) is an American historian whose work focuses on the lives and times of the Founding Fathers of the United States. His book American Sphinx: The Character of Thomas Jefferson won a National Book Award in 1997 and Founding Brothers: The Revolutionary Generation won the 2001 Pulitzer Prize for History. Both books were bestsellers.

== Early life and education ==
Ellis was born in Alexandria, Virginia, on July 18, 1943. He received his B.A. from the College of William and Mary, where he was initiated into Theta Delta Chi. He earned his M.A. and Ph.D. from Yale University in 1969, where Edmund S. Morgan directed his dissertation on a colonial American theologian. At William and Mary, Ellis was in ROTC.

== Career ==
Ellis entered the United States Army in August 1969 and spent three years teaching history at the United States Military Academy at West Point before being discharged as a captain in 1972. Ellis later joined the faculty at Mount Holyoke College. In 1979, he was made full professor and later became the Ford Foundation Professor of History. He has also taught at Williams College and in the Commonwealth Honors College at the University of Massachusetts. His scholarly work has concentrated on the Founding Fathers of the United States, including biographies of John Adams, Thomas Jefferson, and George Washington, the American Revolution, and the history of the Federalist Era, which lasted from 1788 to 1800.

Ellis served as dean of faculty at Mount Holyoke College in South Hadley, Massachusetts from 1980 to 1990; following that, he was named by the trustees to the endowed Ford Foundation Chair in history. For part of 1984, he also served as the college's acting president while president Elizabeth Topham Kennan was on leave. Ellis was suspended without pay in 2001 after falsely telling his students that he had fought in the Vietnam War; he was reappointed to the chair four years later, in 2005. Ellis retired from Mount Holyoke in 2012.

=== Presidential biographies ===
Together with histories of the founding of the republic, since 1993 Ellis has written biographies about individual early presidents and, in 2010, a joint biography of John and Abigail Adams. Interested in how men shaped and were shaped by their times, he writes with a novelist's emphasis on character. Ellis is notable as a respected scholar whose work has also gained popular success; his biography of Jefferson and work on the Founding Fathers have been bestsellers, attaining sales of hundreds of thousands of copies. In 2004, the critic Jonathan Yardley wrote of him: "Ellis doubtless is now the most widely read scholar of the Revolutionary period, and thus probably the most influential as well—at least among the general public..."

==== John Adams ====
As a result of his research, Ellis believed that John Adams was underappreciated as the nation's second president; he worked to reveal the man's contributions and character. His book, Passionate Sage: The Character and Legacy of John Adams, led to a revival of interest in Adams and new appreciation for his achievements.

==== Thomas Jefferson ====
In his book American Sphinx: The Character of Thomas Jefferson (1996), Ellis explored the character and personality of Jefferson, and his many contradictions. He emphasized how important privacy was to him, and how the president and statesman preferred to work behind the scenes in politics, through letters, meetings and discussions over dinners. Ellis noted Jefferson's success in this style.

In relation to one of the major questions about his private life, whether Jefferson had a liaison with his slave Sally Hemings, Ellis suggested that evidence was "inconclusive." His deep analysis of Jefferson's character led him to conclude that the statesman did not have the liaison. Specifically, Ellis says in the appendix to American Sphinx:

Unless the trustees of the Thomas Jefferson Memorial Foundation decide to exhume the remains and do DNA testing on Jefferson as well as some of his alleged progeny, it leaves the matter a mystery about which advocates on either side can freely speculate... This means that for those who demand an answer the only recourse is plausible conjecture, prefaced as it must be with profuse statements about the flimsy and wholly circumstantial character of the evidence. In that spirit, which we might call the spirit of responsible speculation, after five years mulling over the huge cache of evidence that does exist on the thought and character of the historical Jefferson, I have concluded that the likelihood of a liaison with Sally Hemings is remote.

External videos
- Washington Journal interview with Ellis about DNA evidence identifying Thomas Jefferson as the father of one of Sally Hemmings's children, November 7, 1998, C-SPAN

On November 5, 1998, Dr. Eugene Foster and his team published the results of Y-DNA analysis of Jefferson male-line descendants (he had no known male descendants but Y-DNA is passed on virtually unchanged through direct male-line descendants) and descendants of others reputed to be associated with him. Foster reported that DNA results showed a match between the Jefferson male line and the descendant of Eston Hemings. Given that and other historical evidence, they concluded that Thomas Jefferson was the father of Eston and probably of Sally Hemings' other children. The study showed no match between the Carr line, named by two of Jefferson's grandchildren as the father(s) of Hemings' children, and the Eston Hemings descendant, disproving the major alternative to Thomas Jefferson as father.

In interviews on The NewsHour with Jim Lehrer in November 1998 and Frontline's Jefferson's Blood in 2000, Ellis made public statements about his change of opinion following the DNA studies, saying he believed that Jefferson had a long-term relationship with Sally Hemings.

=== George Washington ===
In His Excellency: George Washington (2004), Ellis sought to penetrate myth and examine Washington during three major periods of his life. Ellis described how Washington's experiences in earlier leadership contributed to his actions and development as president. Ellis wrote that "we do not need another epic [Washington biography], but rather a fresh portrait focused tightly on Washington's character", which the critic Jonathan Yardley said he had achieved.

== False claims of combat service and anti-war leadership ==
In June 2001, The Boston Globe revealed that Ellis had misled his students in lectures and the public through the media about his role in the Vietnam War years. Ellis falsely claimed that he had been involved in protests in the civil rights movement and anti-war movement in the 1960s. He also repeatedly claimed to have fought in the Vietnam War. In one of his lectures, Ellis stated that he had been involved in helping to clear an area near My Lai shortly before a well-known massacre was carried out in the village. In a 2000 interview, he claimed to have been a platoon leader, a paratrooper in the 101st Airborne Division, and to have served on the staff of General William Westmoreland in Saigon. In actuality, although he had been in the U.S. Army during the Vietnam War era, Ellis had never served in Vietnam at all.

Ellis issued a public apology in August 2001. He cited rumors at Mount Holyoke campus that he had served in Vietnam but would not talk about it because of some disturbing experience as something that led him to fabricate claims of service. He said that he had felt guilty about not actually serving in Vietnam. In the ensuing controversy, Mount Holyoke suspended him without pay for a year. He returned to the classroom at the end of that time. However, Ellis was prohibited from again teaching his course on the 1960s, during which most of his fabrications were made. In May 2005, Mount Holyoke restored his position as Ford Foundation Professor of History.

== Publications ==
=== Books ===
| Title | Year | ISBN | Publisher | Subject matter | Interviews, presentations, and reviews | Comments |
|---|---|---|---|---|---|---|
| The New England Mind in Transition: Samuel Johnson of Connecticut, 1696–1772 | 1973 | ISBN 9780300016154 | Yale University Press | Samuel Johnson | | |
| School for Soldiers: West Point and the Profession of Arms | 1974 | ISBN 9780195018431 | Oxford University Press | United States Military Academy | | Written with Robert Moore |
| After the Revolution: Profiles of Early American Culture | 1979 | ISBN 9780393012538 | W. W. Norton | | | |
| Passionate Sage: The Character and Legacy of John Adams | 1993 | ISBN 9780393034790 | W. W. Norton | John Adams | Booknotes interview with Ellis on Passionate Sage, September 5, 1993, C-SPAN | |
| American Sphinx: The Character of Thomas Jefferson | 1996 | ISBN 9780679444909 | Alfred A. Knopf | Thomas Jefferson | Presentation by Ellis on American Sphinx, February 23, 1997, C-SPAN | Winner of the 1997 National Book Award for Nonfiction |
| What Did the Declaration Declare? | 1999 | ISBN 9780312190637 | Bedford/St. Martin's | United States Declaration of Independence | | Ellis was the editor of and a contributor to this volume in the Historians at Work series |
| Founding Brothers: The Revolutionary Generation | 2000 | ISBN 9780375405440 | Alfred A. Knopf | John Adams, Thomas Jefferson, George Washington, James Madison, Alexander Hamilton, and Aaron Burr | Presentation by Ellis on Founding Brothers, October 22, 2000, C-SPAN; Presentation by Ellis on Founding Brothers, June 22, 2001, C-SPAN | Winner of the 2001 Pulitzer Prize for History |
| His Excellency: George Washington | 2004 | ISBN 9781400040315 | Alfred A. Knopf | George Washington | Presentation by Ellis on His Excellency: George Washington, December 16, 2004, C-SPAN; Presentation by Ellis on His Excellency: George Washington, September 24, 2005, C-SPAN | |
| American Creation: Triumphs and Tragedies at the Founding of the Republic | 2007 | ISBN 9780307263698 | Alfred A. Knopf | | Discussion with Ellis on American Creation, November 29, 2007, C-SPAN; Interview with Ellis on American Creation, September 8, 2008, EconTalk | |
| First Family: Abigail and John Adams | 2010 | ISBN 9780307269621 | Alfred A. Knopf | Abigail Adams, John Adams | Presentation by Ellis on First Family, October 27, 2010, C-SPAN | |
| Revolutionary Summer: The Birth of American Independence | 2013 | ISBN 9780307701220 | Alfred A. Knopf | | Presentation by Ellis on Revolutionary Summer, July 17, 2013, C-SPAN | |
| The Quartet: Orchestrating the Second American Revolution, 1783-1789 | 2015 | ISBN 9780385353403 | Alfred A. Knopf | | The Quartet: Orchestrating the Second American Revolution , National Archives, May 12, 2015; Presentation by Ellis on The Quartet, May 14, 2015, C-SPAN; Presentation by Ellis on The Quartet, September 5, 2015, C-SPAN | |
| American Dialogue: The Founders and Us | 2018 | ISBN 9780385353427 | Alfred A. Knopf | | Presentation by Ellis on American Dialogue, October 16, 2018, C-SPAN | |
| The Cause: The American Revolution and its Discontents, 1773-1783 | 2021 | ISBN 9781631498985 | Liveright Publishing | | Presentation by Ellis on The Cause, September 19, 2021, C-SPAN; Interview with Ellis on The Cause, October 10, 2021, C-SPAN | |
| The Great Contradiction: The Tragic Side of the American Founding | 2025 | ISBN 9780593801413 | Alfred A. Knopf | | | |

=== Essays ===
- long listing
- Ellis, Joseph J. (June 16, 2013). "1776, the summer America was born". Salon. Archived from the original on June 16, 2013.
- "Madison’s Radical Agenda", American Heritage, Winter 2010
- "Inventing the Presidency", American Heritage, October 2004.
- "Intimate Enemies" (John Adams and Thomas Jefferson), American Heritage, September 2000.

=== Editorials ===
- "Tea party wants to take America back -- to the 18th century," Los Angeles Times, Op-Ed, October 15, 2013.
- "A promise of unpredictability: Presidential candidates pledge a lot, but history says you can ignore most of it" - Los Angeles Times (Jan 2, 2008)
- "What Would George Do?: Okay, He Never Saw a Chopper, but He Can Still Teach Us a Thing or Two." - Washington Post (Dec 23, 2007)
- "Finding a Place for 9/11 in American History " - New York Times (Jan 28, 2006)
