= Jack N. Rakove =

American historian (born 1947)

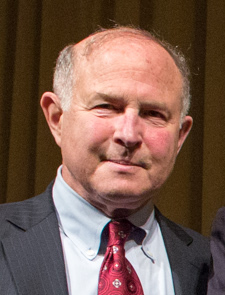
- Born: June 4, 1947 (age 79); Chicago, Illinois, U.S.
- Awards: Pulitzer Prize for History

Academic background
- Education: Haverford College (BA); Harvard University (PhD); University of Edinburgh

Academic work
- Discipline: History
- Institutions: Stanford University

Jack Norman Rakove (born June 4, 1947) is an American historian, author, and professor at Stanford University. He is a Pulitzer Prize winner.

== Life ==
Jack Rakove was born in Chicago to political science Professor Milton L. Rakove (1918–1983) and his wife, Shirley. The elder Rakove taught at the University of Illinois at Chicago (1957–1983) and Barat College (Lake Forest, Illinois).

Jack Rakove earned his AB degree in 1968 from Haverford College and his Ph D in 1975 from Harvard University. He also studied at the University of Edinburgh from 1966 to 1967. At Harvard, he was a student of Bernard Bailyn.

Rakove is the W.R. Coe Professor of History and American Studies and professor of political science at Stanford University, where he has taught since 1980. He taught at Colgate University from 1975 to 1980 and has been a visiting professor at the New York University School of Law.

Rakove won the 1997 Pulitzer Prize for History and the 1998 Cox Book Prize for Original Meanings: Politics and Ideas in the Making of the Constitution (1996), which questioned whether originalism is a comprehensive and exhaustive means of interpreting the Constitution. Revolutionaries: A New History of the Invention of America (Houghton Mifflin Harcourt), was a finalist for the George Washington Book Prize.

In 2007 he was elected to the American Philosophical Society; and in 2000, to the American Antiquarian Society.

== Works ==
External videos
- Booknotes interview with Jack Rakove on Original Meanings, July 6, 1997, C-SPAN
- Presentation by Rakove on Revolutionaries, May 11, 2010, C-SPAN

- The Beginnings of National Politics: An Interpretive History of the Continental Congress Alfred Knopf, 1979; reprint: Johns Hopkins University Press, 1982, ISBN 9780801828645
- James Madison and the Creation of the American Republic Scott, Foresman/Little, Brown Higher Education, 1990, ISBN 9780673399946
- Original Meanings: Politics and Ideas in the Making of the Constitution A.A. Knopf, 1996, ISBN 9780394578583; reprint: Knopf Doubleday Publishing Group, 2010, ISBN 9780307434517
- Declaring Rights: A Brief History with Documents Bedford/St. Martin's, 1998, ISBN 9780312137342
- Making a Hash of Sovereignty, Part I, The Green Bag (Autumn 1998), pages 35–44
- Making a Hash of Sovereignty, Part II, The Green Bag (Autumn 1999)
- The Unfinished Election of 2000. Basic Books. September 1, 2002. ISBN 978-0-465-06838-8.
- Revolutionaries: A New History of the Invention of America. Houghton Mifflin Harcourt. May 11, 2010. ISBN 978-0-547-48674-1.
- Beyond Belief, Beyond Conscience, The Radical Significance of the Free Exercise of Religion. (2020)
