= Those Who Prey =

Novel by Jennifer Moffett

- Cover of the first edition
- Author: Jennifer Moffett
- Cover artist: Debra Sfetseios-Conover; Adams Carvalho
- Genre: Young adult Thriller
- Publisher: Atheneum Books
- Publication date: November 10, 2020
- Publication place: United States
- ISBN: 978-1-534-45096-7

Those Who Prey is a young adult thriller novel by Jennifer Moffett, published by Simon & Schuster in 2020. It follows the story of Emily, a freshman at Boston University, and how she gets manipulated into becoming part of a cult.

The book follows Emily’s journey as she becomes increasingly involved with a cult operating within her college campus. It displays her descent into submission, and how she falls deeper and deeper into the cult’s control. It narrates her struggle to understand the rules she is being made to adhere to, and how they lead to her eventual escape.

The narration is divided into four sections, and utilizes multimedia formats such as newspaper articles and interviews. Moffett has stated that she drew inspiration for the novel from her own fundamentalist evangelical upbringing, and the widespread cult recruitment present at the university she attended.

== Plot ==
=== Part One: Boston, Spring Semester 1994 ===
Emily is a freshman at Boston University, who has recently moved from her small hometown of Oceanview, Mississippi. She finds it challenging, as she is unable to adjust to make friends or fit in to her new environment. One day, while she is sitting in a coffee shop, she is approached by Josh, a fellow student who takes an interest in the Henry James book she is reading. The two strike up a conversation, and Josh invites Emily to meet his friends. The next day, she meets Andrew and Heather, who also study at the university. They seem to connect with her easily, but their meeting is cut short when they leave abruptly to attend a symposium. Emily is confused, but excited to have finally met like-minded people at her college campus.

The next time they meet, she is introduced to Josh’s roommate, Ben. They play a game of Pictionary, but leave for a boys-only study meeting. This leaves Heather, who invites Emily to a meeting of the symposium they all go to. Out of curiosity, Emily attends, and she is introduced to their regional director, Meredith, who tells her she is special and that it would be wonderful to have her join their organization, The Kingdom. Emily and Heather become study partners, called 'DPs', for The Kingdom, with Heather guiding her through activities such as making a list of her sins, telling them to Heather, and revealing that her mother died after drowning at a beach when she was young. Throughout this period, Emily and Josh are seeing each other secretly because the rules of The Kingdom dictate that they cannot date until Emily has been baptized.

At Emily's baptism, Meredith tells her that she sees something special in Emily, and wants her to accompany some disciples to an internship for The Kingdom in Italy. Her husband, Will, the regional director of The Kingdom's Florida headquarters, will also be present. Notably, he was miraculously cured of a venomous snake bite while on a mission in Africa. Heather, however, is not invited, despite repeated requests to Meredith. This unsettles Emily, but Josh convinces her to come, stating that they will finally be able to date in public in Italy.

=== Part Two: Italy, May 1994 ===
Emily reaches Italy, where she meets her new DP, Kara. After giving her passport and money to Will for safekeeping, she participates in activities with her fellow disciples that leave her confused and anxious. They are made to proselytize to people in Florence, with very little success. Emily is further unsettled when she finds a venomous snake in the room that she and Kara share. Although she is told Ben did it as a practical joke, she remains wary of her surroundings and wonders what she has really gotten herself into.

Meanwhile, Kara leaves the room and begins to stay at a nearby holiday villa. She tells Emily that she is done with The Kingdom and intends to leave. Andrew also runs away after revealing to Emily that he knows he is in a cult. Meanwhile, Will tells the group that there is sin among them, and locks them all in a bedroom together with a small vial of an unknown liquid, which is later revealed to be snake venom.

=== Part Three: Europe, July 1994 ===
After escaping from the room, Emily finally decides to leave, intending to meet Kara at the holiday villa. However, upon reaching, she finds Kara dead with a syringe next to her. She takes Kara’s backpack, which contains her passport, and gets on the first train to Paris. However, she realizes that a necklace her mother gave her has gone missing, and suspects someone in The Kingdom has taken it. She arranges to meet Josh in Milan, where he reveals that he too is planning to leave. He tells her that the vial of snake venom was part of a ritual called The Remnant, which was meant to eradicate sin among the disciples.

They board a train together, but Emily is still suspicious of Josh’s true intentions and ends up leaving him to go back to Florence. She encounters Meredith, retrieves her mother’s necklace, and manages to contact her father. She goes to Zurich to meet her godmother Deborah, whom she reveals her journey to. Deborah is shocked, and tells her she must go back to the United States to ensure The Kingdom faces legal action.

=== Part Four: Oceanview, Mississippi, August 1994 ===
Emily is finally back at home, and attempting to understand everything she went through. After listening to one of Kara’s mixtapes, she realizes they were actually recordings of the confessions made to their DPs in Boston. She tries showing them to her father, but he tells her they cannot be used as evidence because they were stolen. She is approached by a journalist, Julia, who is interested in documenting her encounter with The Kingdom. Julia tells her that it was Josh who told her to contact Emily, and the two of them reunite. Emily gives Josh the tape of him confessing his sins, and burns the rest to ensure that no one has to hear them.

It is revealed that Will was found dead in his car with a Black mamba, allegedly attempting to perform a ritual as part of The Remnant. Kara was Will’s daughter, and her mother was the nurse who saved his life in Africa (which he had attributed to a miracle from the Lord). The Kingdom is expelled from Boston University’s campus, and Emily takes her first steps towards healing.

== Characters ==
- Emily: a freshman at Boston University, originally from the Gulf Coast in Mississippi. She is kind and honest, but falls into the cult because of her loneliness upon joining university, where she struggles socially.
- Josh: an English student at Boston University who takes a romantic interest in Emily. He initially introduces her to the other members and goes to Italy with her, although their relationship suffers after Emily begins to question the rules that The Kingdom makes them follow.
- Heather: a student at Boston University who is Emily’s first DP. She struggles with an eating disorder, and believes that The Kingdom can lead her to salvation. She is not chosen to proselytize in Italy, and stays back in Boston to recruit new members.
- Andrew: an engineering student at Massachusetts Institute of Technology. He is originally from the Midwest, and his father is an important government official. He is gay, which his family disapproves of and believes that The Kingdom can cure him of.
- Kara: a mysterious member of The Kingdom from Florida, who is revealed to be Will’s daughter. She helps Emily settle into Italy and facilitates her eventual escape. She is killed after being stabbed with a syringe full of snake venom, although the perpetrator is never revealed.
- Meredith: Will’s wife and the director of The Kingdom’s Boston center. She is young, beautiful, and charismatic, and members are often drawn to her. She accompanies the members to Italy, where she instructs them upon how to spread the word of The Kingdom.
- Will: Meredith’s husband and Kara’s father, who heads The Kingdom’s center in Florida. He was bitten by a snake while on a mission in Africa, but survived due to timely medical care. He is eventually found dead in his car while attempting to perform a miracle as part of a ritual.

== Themes ==
The novel focuses heavily on cults and their recruitment tactics, revolving heavily around a seven-step plan followed by The Kingdom to attract new members. This plan mirrors those used by real campus cults, with the intent to convert students into potential attendees.

== Reception ==
The book received generally good reviews, with commentators calling it a well-researched psychological thriller and a strong debut novel. It received some criticism for its pacing, with Kirkus Reviews calling it ‘enthralling but not engaging’. Meanwhile, The Nerd Daily stated that it is an ‘astonishing, almost didactic guide on cults, psychological manipulation, and emotional survival.’ Aspects of the novel that attracted praise included its depictions of cult recruitment, emotional manipulation, and the process of healing after escape.
