= Ann Arensberg =

American author (1937–2022)

- Born: February 21, 1937; Pittsburgh, Pennsylvania, US
- Died: January 14, 2022 (aged 84); Sharon, Connecticut, US
- Education: Radcliffe College, Bachelor of Arts, 1958; Harvard College, Master's degree in French literature, 1962
- Occupation(s): Book publishing editor and author
- Years active: 1967-1999

Ann Arensberg (February 21, 1937 – January 14, 2022) was an American book publishing editor and author. She worked for E. P. Dutton and the Metropolitan Museum of Art before joining Viking Press in 1967. Arensberg worked as an editor there until she began her writing career in 1974. Her stories "Art History" and "Group Sex" were chosen for the 1975 and 1980 O. Henry Award Stories collections. After writing her two novellas, Arensberg won the American Book Award for First Novel in 1981 with Sister Wolf while the award replaced the National Book Awards during the 1980s. Her later publications include a novelization of "Group Sex" in 1986 and an additional novel, Incubus, in 1999.

== Early life and education ==
Arensberg was born in Pittsburgh, Pennsylvania, on February 21, 1937. Arensberg's father was employed by a glassmaking company in Havana, Cuba. Her mother worked in education before she co-created Free Cuba Radio with the Central Intelligence Agency.

In 1946, Arensberg started living in Havana and grew up there until she was in her early twenties. For her education, Arensberg started her creative writing experience while attending Concord Academy as a teenager. As a post-secondary student, Arensberg completed a Bachelor of Arts from Radcliffe College in 1958. She then received a Master's degree in French literature from Harvard College in 1962.

== Career ==
Arensberg began her career in various places including book publisher E. P. Dutton and the Metropolitan Museum of Art. Arensberg continued her literary career in 1967 when she became an editor for Viking Press. Upon leaving Viking in 1974, Arensberg wrote the story "Art History" for Antaeus that year. Prior to "Art History", Arensberg discarded her first attempt at writing.

After publishing "Group Sex" for Canto magazine in 1979, Arensberg moved away from novellas the following year with the release of her first novel Sister Wolf in 1980. Later on in her writing career, Arensberg republished "Group Sex" as a novel in 1986 and wrote her third novel Incubus in 1999. Following the release of Incubus, Arensberg had two books in progress by March 1999.

== Awards and honors ==
Arensberg appeared in the O. Henry Award Stories in 1975 with "Art History" and 1980 with "Group Sex". When the National Book Awards were replaced with the American Book Awards during the 1980s, Arensberg won the American Book Award for First Novel in 1981 with Sister Wolf.

== Personal life and death ==
Arensberg was married twice and had three step-children. She died from complications of COVID-19 in Sharon, Connecticut, on January 14, 2022, at the age of 84.
