= God: A Biography =

1995 literary criticism book by Jack Miles

- First edition
- Author: Jack Miles
- Language: English
- Genre: Religion
- Publisher: Alfred A. Knopf, Inc.
- Publication date: 1995
- Publication place: United States
- Media type: Print (Hardcover)
- Pages: 408
- ISBN: 0-679-74368-5
- OCLC: 317866561

God: A Biography is a 1995 non-fiction book by Jack Miles. The book recounts the tale of existence of the Abrahamic deity as the protagonist of the Hebrew Tanakh or Christian Bible Old Testament. The Tanakh and the Old Testament contain the same books, but the order of the books is different. Miles uses the ordering found in the Tanakh to provide the narrative on which his analysis is based. The book's central structure is that God's character develops progressively within the narrative. The accounts of God's actions in the various books are then used to deduce information about God's nature and motivation. The book won the 1996 Pulitzer Prize for Biography or Autobiography.
