= Founding Brothers =

2000 book written by Joseph Ellis

Founding Brothers: The Revolutionary Generation
- Cover art for the hardback edition
- Author: Joseph Ellis
- Language: English
- Genre: Non-Fiction
- Publisher: Alfred A. Knopf
- Publication date: 2000
- Publication place: United States
- Media type: Print (Hardback)
- Pages: 304 (248 without source notes)
- ISBN: 0-375-40544-5

Founding Brothers: The Revolutionary Generation is a 2000 book written by Joseph Ellis, a professor of history at Mount Holyoke College, which won the 2001 Pulitzer Prize for History. It explores selected interactions among a group of individuals both gifted and flawed; interactions that profoundly influenced the early development of the United States.

== Overview ==
Ellis constructed his book by assessing certain events during the decade following the 1787 Constitutional Convention,

He chooses to do this not in any systematic or comprehensive manner, but by focusing on a half-dozen political personages (John Adams, Thomas Jefferson, George Washington, James Madison, Alexander Hamilton and Aaron Burr) and a handful of revealing episodes that would test their convictions and friendships.

He notes that Ellis borrowed his technique from Lytton Strachey's classic study, Eminent Victorians, about notable English figures.

- Chapter One: The Duel covers the deadly political and personal rivalry between Aaron Burr and Alexander Hamilton, which ultimately led to the Burr–Hamilton duel, which Ellis attributes in part to the passions inflamed by the Revolution. Only a few facts are known about "the most famous encounter of its kind in American history." (pg 20) Burr and Hamilton rowed out to a secluded spot in separate boats and exchanged pistol shots from 10 paces apart. Hamilton was shot in his right side and died.
- Chapter Two: The Dinner explores the secret conversations and negotiations leading to selection of the Potomac River site for construction of the new national capital, in exchange for Virginia's support of Hamilton's plan for assumption of state debts by the federal government.
- Chapter Three: The Silence describes the tacit agreement by the nation's founders to postpone discussion of regulation of slavery in the United States, concluding that any early attempt at abolition would doom the union before it had a chance to become established.
- Chapter Four: The Farewell dissects the Farewell Address of President George Washington, and Washington's views on the best course for the new nation, and a slightly in depth look into some of the views the founding fathers had on issues, such as Jay's Treaty.
- Chapter Five: The Collaborators analyzes two important relationships; the one between John Adams and his wife Abigail during his presidency; and the other between Thomas Jefferson and James Madison during the same time period.
- Chapter Six: The Friendship is devoted to the extensive correspondence between Adams and Jefferson during the last fourteen years of their lives, reviving their lost friendship and expounding on their lives.

== Awards ==
- 2001: Pulitzer Prize for History

== Reviews ==
Joyce Appleby of The Washington Post Book World commented that, "In lesser hands the fractious disputes and hysterical rhetoric of these contentious nation-builders might come across as hyperbolic pettiness. Ellis knows better, and he unpacks the real issues for his readers, revealing the driving assumptions and riveting fears that animated Americans' first encounter with the organized ideologies and interests we call parties."

== Documentary ==
In 2002, The History Channel produced a three-and-a-half hour documentary covering the various topics of the book. In 2011 Ellis co-authored a screen statement with a former student, Daliah Leslie in an effort to make a feature film adaptation. The treatment was based on one chapter of the award-winning book entitled “The Duel.”

== Notes ==
Preceded by Freedom From Fear	Pulitzer Prize for History; 2001	Succeeded by The Metaphysical Club
