= Jack Miles =

American writer (born 1942)

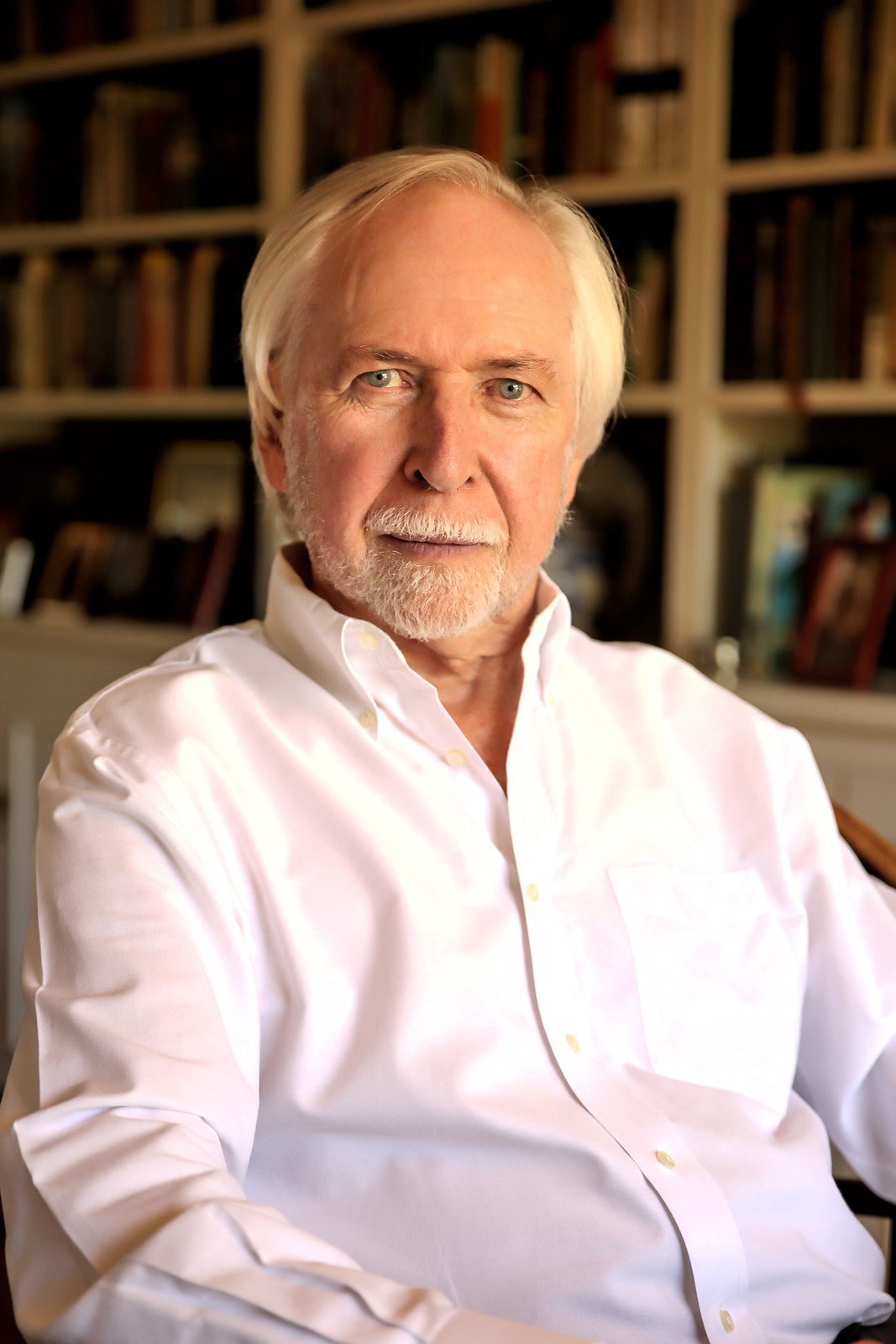
- Born: John Russiano Miles; July 30, 1942 (age 84); Chicago, Illinois, US
- Education: Xavier University; Pontifical Gregorian University; Hebrew University
- Alma mater: Harvard University
- Occupations: Scholar, Author, Writer, Editor, Professor
- Writing career
- Pen name: Jack
- Language: English
- Genres: religion, literature, the Bible, public policy, book reviews, art criticism
- Notable awards: Guggenheim Fellowship; Pulitzer Prize; MacArthur Fellowship.
- Website: www.jackmiles.com

John R. Miles (born July 30, 1942) is an American author. He is a winner of the Pulitzer Prize, a Guggenheim Fellowship and the MacArthur Fellowship. His writings on religion, politics, and culture have appeared in numerous national publications, including The Atlantic Monthly, The New York Times, The Boston Globe, The Washington Post, Los Angeles Times, and Commonweal Magazine.

Miles treats his biblical subjects neither as transcendent deities nor historical figures, but as literary protagonists. His first book, God: A Biography, won the Pulitzer Prize for Biography or Autobiography in 1996, and has been translated into sixteen languages. His second book, Christ: A Crisis in the Life of God, was named a New York Times Notable Book of 2002. Miles is general editor of the Norton Anthology of World Religions (November 2014). Miles' book God in the Qur'an was published in 2018, the third in his God in Three Classic Scriptures series. Miles' next related book is Religion as We Know It: An Origin Story, (Nov. 12, 2019) which examines when religion became a distinct area of thought.

Miles' most recent book is co-written with Mark C. Taylor, and is titled A Friendship in Twilight: Lockdown Conversations on Death and Life, (July 5, 2022) a series of emails exchanged during the course of the COVID-19 pandemic in 2020.

== Career ==
Born in Chicago, the eldest child in a Roman Catholic family, Miles was a Jesuit seminarian from 1960 to 1970, studying at Xavier University in Cincinnati, Pontifical Gregorian University in Rome, and Hebrew University in Jerusalem before completing a doctorate in the Department of Near Eastern Languages at Harvard University. He later left the Catholic Church and became a member of the Episcopal Church. He is fluent in several languages, including French, Italian, German, Hebrew, and Aramaic.

Over a period of more than 35 years (1975–2010), Miles has been an editor at Doubleday, the executive editor at the University of California Press, the literary (book review) editor at the Los Angeles Times, a member of the Times editorial board, and the Senior Adviser to the Getty Trust at the J. Paul Getty Museum.

Miles most recently served on the faculty of the University of California, Irvine, Department of English, teaching religion. Miles was the 2018-2019 Corcoran Visiting Chair in Christian-Jewish Relations at Boston College.

== Major works ==
- God: A Biography. Vintage Books. November 2, 2014. ISBN 9780679743682.
- Christ: A Crisis in the Life of God. Knopf Doubleday Publishing Group. April 27, 2011. ISBN 978-0-307-78910-5.
- The Norton Anthology of World Religions. W.W. Norton & Company. November 2, 2014. ISBN 978-0393062533.
- God in the Qur'an. Knopf Doubleday Publishing Group. November 13, 2018. ISBN 9780307269577.
- Religion as We Know It: An Origin Story. W.W. Norton & Company. November 12, 2019. ISBN 9781324002789.
- A Friendship in Twilight: Lockdown Conversations on Death and Life. Columbia University Press. July 5, 2022. ISBN 9780231556248.
