= Alfred A. Knopf Jr. =

American publisher (1918–2009)

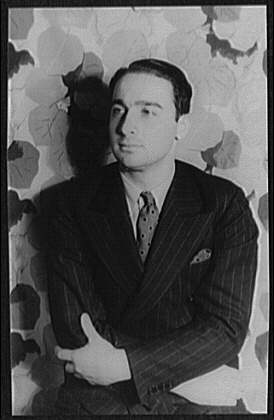
- Alfred A. Knopf Jr. in 1937
- Born: June 17, 1918; White Plains, New York, U.S.
- Died: February 14, 2009 (aged 90); U.S.
- Occupation: Publisher
- Spouse: Alice Laine (m. 1952)
- Children: 3
- Parent(s): Alfred A. Knopf Sr. Blanche Knopf

Alfred Abraham Knopf Jr. (June 17, 1918 – February 14, 2009) was an American publisher. He was one of the founders of Atheneum Publishers in 1959.

== Biography ==
He was the only child of publisher Alfred A. Knopf Sr. and Blanche Wolf. He was born in White Plains, New York, on June 17, 1918, and as a child, was given the nickname "Pat". His parents founded the book company Alfred A. Knopf in 1915. In 1921, Knopf attended the Birch Wathen School while his parents were in Europe. At the age of seven, in 1925, he was sent to a boarding school, first at the Riverdale Country School, in the Bronx, New York. From 1933 until 1937, he attended Phillips Exeter Academy and attended Union College for three years.

The summer after he graduated from Exeter, he ran away from home, despondent over being turned down by Princeton University. Following a police search, he was found in Salt Lake City, Utah.

During World War II, Knopf joined the Army Air Force and served in the 446th Bomb Group, Eighth Air Force. During his service, he piloted the B-24 Bomber "Rough Buddy" through almost 100 missions alongside engineer Richard E. Morton. He became a captain.

In 1952, he married Alice Laine. They had three children, Alison Knopf Insinger, Susan Knopf, and David A. Knopf.

He was one of the founders of Atheneum Publishers in 1959. He died on February 14, 2009, from complications following a fall.
