= 2022 Pulitzer Prize =

Awards for journalism and related fields

The 2022 Pulitzer Prizes were awarded by the Pulitzer Prize Board for work during the 2021 calendar year on May 9, 2022. The awards highlighted coverage of major stories in the U.S. that year, including the January 6 United States Capitol attack, for which The Washington Post won the Public Service prize, considered the most prestigious award. The New York Times received three awards, the most of any publication. Insider received its first Pulitzer.

The Editorial Cartooning prize was superseded in 2022 by the revamped category of Illustrated Reporting and Commentary. No winner was selected in the former category in 2021, which drew controversy.

== Prizes ==
Winners and finalists for the prizes are listed below, with the winners marked in bold.

=== Journalism ===
Public Service
**The Washington Post**, "for its compellingly told and vividly presented account of the assault on Washington on January 6, 2021, providing the public with a thorough and unflinching understanding of one of the nation's darkest days."
Milwaukee Journal Sentinel, "for powerful coverage that exposed an unknown epidemic of electrical fires in the city's rental properties and a widespread lack of accountability. "
The New York Times, "for courageous and relentless reporting that exposed the vast civilian toll of U.S.-led airstrikes, challenging official accounts of American military engagements in Iraq, Syria and Afghanistan." Moved to the International Reporting category, where it was also entered and ultimately won in)

Breaking News Reporting
**Staff of the Miami Herald**, "for its urgent yet sweeping coverage of the collapse of the Champlain Towers South condominium complex, merging clear and compassionate writing with comprehensive news and accountability reporting."
Staff of the Los Angeles Times, "for deeply sourced and detailed reporting about a fatal shooting on the set of the film Rust that moved beyond the day's events to a larger consideration of labor and safety concerns in the film industry."
Staff of The New York Times, "for its aggressive and revelatory reporting about the attack on Washington on January 6, 2021, delivered as the events were unfolding and afterwards."

Investigative Reporting
**Corey G. Johnson, Rebecca Woolington and Eli Murray of the Tampa Bay Times**, "for a compelling exposé of highly toxic hazards inside Florida's only battery recycling plant that forced the implementation of safety measures to adequately protect workers and nearby residents."
Hannah Dreier and Andrew Ba Tran of The Washington Post, "for a gripping, deeply reported series that illuminated how FEMA fails American disaster survivors by not confronting structural racism or climate change, prompting policy overhauls."
Jeffrey Meitrodt and Nicole Norfleet of the Star Tribune, Minneapolis, Minn., "for comprehensive and tenacious reporting that exposed how financial service companies purchased settlements from vulnerable accident victims across the country, convincing them to give up millions of dollars, often with judges' approval."

Explanatory Reporting
**Staff of Quanta Magazine, New York, N.Y., notably Natalie Wolchover**, "for coverage that revealed the complexities of building the James Webb Space Telescope, designed to facilitate groundbreaking astronomical and cosmological research."
Staff of The Philadelphia Inquirer, "for a richly reported series that, with compelling writing and photography, tackled the complex roots of gun violence in the city, centering on the people and communities most affected by it."
Staff of The Wall Street Journal, "for stories that vividly reconstructed the 1921 Tulsa Race Massacre and illuminated its enduring effects, describing how the destruction of Black wealth and property burdened future generations."

Local Reporting
**Madison Hopkins of the Better Government Association and Cecilia Reyes of the Chicago Tribune**, "for a piercing examination of the city's long history of failed building- and fire-safety code enforcement, which let scofflaw landlords commit serious violations that resulted in dozens of unnecessary deaths."
Lulu Ramadan of The Palm Beach Post and Ash Ngu, Maya Miller and Nadia Sussman of ProPublica, "for a comprehensive investigation, including interactives and graphics, that revealed dangerous air quality during Florida's sugar cane harvest season and prompted significant reforms."
Tony Cook, Johnny Magdaleno and Michelle Pemberton of The Indianapolis Star, "for their critical examination of Indiana's "Red Flag" gun law, identifying numerous instances where police and prosecutors had failed to understand and enforce the law."

National Reporting
**Staff of The New York Times**, "for an ambitious project that quantified a disturbing pattern of fatal traffic stops by police, illustrating how hundreds of deaths could have been avoided and how officers typically avoided punishment."
Eli Hager of The Marshall Project and Joseph Shapiro, contributor, of National Public Radio, "for powerful reporting that exposed how local government agencies throughout America quietly pocketed Social Security benefits intended for children in foster care."
Staff of The Washington Post, "for a sweeping series on environmental racism, illuminating how American communities of color have disproportionately suffered for decades from dirty air, polluted water and lax or nonexistent environmental protection."

International Reporting
**Staff of The New York Times**, "for courageous and relentless reporting that exposed the vast civilian toll of U.S.-led airstrikes, challenging official accounts of American military engagements in Iraq, Syria and Afghanistan." (Moved by the Board from the Public Service category, where it was also nominated.)
Staff of The New York Times, "for richly immersive coverage of the sudden, chaotic fall of the Afghan government and the return of the Taliban, highlighting the experience of Afghans as well as the reporters themselves."
Staff of The New York Times, "for a stunning investigation of the assassination of Haiti's president that uncovered pervasive corruption across government, security forces and business elites, including a likely motive for the murder: a secret dossier the president was compiling of powerful arms and drug traffickers.
Yaroslav Trofimov and the Staff of The Wall Street Journal, "for probing, deeply reported stories on the U.S. withdrawal from Afghanistan, including exclusive interviews conducted before the Taliban's return, casting new light on what happened in the country and what might come next."

Feature Writing
**Jennifer Senior of The Atlantic**, "For an unflinching portrait of a family's reckoning with loss in the 20 years since 9/11, masterfully braiding the author's personal connection to the story with sensitive reporting that reveals the long reach of grief."
Anand Gopal, contributing writer, The New Yorker, "for his account, published shortly after the U.S. announced its departure from Afghanistan, of Afghan women who have been forgotten in the dominant narrative about the war."
Meribah Knight of WPLN, contributor, and Ken Armstrong of ProPublica, "for their enterprising and empathetic account of 11 Black children in Tennessee who were arrested for a crime that doesn't exist."

Commentary
**Melinda Henneberger of The Kansas City Star**, "For persuasive columns demanding justice for alleged victims of a retired police detective accused of being a sexual predator."
Julian Aguon, freelance contributor, The Atlantic, "for an illuminating essay that explores the familiar threats of climate change through the lesser-known stories of Indigenous Pacific Island communities who are fighting rising seas with a resilience that is both heartbreaking and hopeful."
Zeynep Tufekci, "for her insightful, often prescient, columns on the pandemic and American culture, published in The New York Times and The Atlantic, that brought clarity to the shifting official guidance and compelled us towards greater compassion and informed response."

Criticism
**Salamishah Tillet of The New York Times**, "For learned and stylish writing about Black stories in art and popular culture–work that successfully bridges academic and nonacademic critical discourse."
Peter Schjeldahl of The New Yorker, "for accessible and dedicated art criticism that introduces or revisits painters, institutions and movements, offering tender appreciations and unflinching dissents."
Sophie Gilbert of The Atlantic, "for articles that bring clarity and insight to questions concerning gender norms, feminism, and popular culture."

Editorial Writing
**Lisa Falkenberg, Michael Lindenberger, Joe Holley and Luis Carrasco of the Houston Chronicle**, "For a campaign that, with original reporting, revealed voter suppression tactics, rejected the myth of widespread voter fraud and argued for sensible voting reforms."
Editorial Staff of The Times-Picayune/The New Orleans Advocate, "for editorials demanding transparency and accountability on behalf of the people of Louisiana when an investigative reporter was sued by the state's attorney general for making a public records request."
Abdallah Fayyad of The Boston Globe, "for a persuasive editorial series arguing that the president of the United States could be prosecuted for crimes committed in office."

Illustrated Reporting and Commentary
**Fahmida Azim, Anthony Del Col, Josh Adams and Walt Hickey of Insider**, "For using graphic reportage and the comics medium to tell a powerful yet intimate story of the Chinese oppression of the Uyghurs, making the issue accessible to a wider public."
Ann Telnaes of The Washington Post, "For succinct and layered cartoons covering a wide range of social and political topics with immediacy and impact."
Zoe Si, contributor, The New Yorker, "For cartoons that use simply drawn figures, inclusive representation and sharply observed punchlines to capture political realities and daily life during the pandemic, inviting reflection and empathy."

Breaking News Photography
**Marcus Yam of the Los Angeles Times**, "for raw and urgent images of the U.S. departure from Afghanistan that capture the human cost of the historic change in the country." (Moved from Feature Photography by the jury.)
**Win McNamee, Drew Angerer, Spencer Platt, Samuel Corum and Jon Cherry of Getty Images**, "for comprehensive and consistently riveting photos of the attack on the U.S. Capitol."
Anonymous, freelance contributor, The New York Times, "for striking images, conducted at great personal risk, of the military coup in Myanmar."

Feature Photography
**Adnan Abidi, Sanna Irshad Mattoo, Amit Dave and the late Danish Siddiqui of Reuters**, "for images of COVID's toll in India that balanced intimacy and devastation, while offering viewers a heightened sense of place." (Moved from Breaking News Photography by the jury.)
Gabrielle Lurie of the San Francisco Chronicle, "for intimate and harrowing images of a mother's attempts to care for her homeless, drug-addicted daughter."
Photography Staff of Reuters, "for images of climate change collected around the globe, effectively portraying extreme and dangerous natural events as common and widespread threats to human life."

Audio Reporting
**Staffs of Futuro Media, New York, N.Y. and PRX, Boston, Mass.**, "for 'Suave,' a brutally honest and immersive profile of a man reentering society after serving more than 30 years in prison."
Eyder Peralta, Solomon Fisseha, Alsanosi Adam and Halima Athumani of National Public Radio, "for their compelling, accessible and empathetic stories on the complicated war and threats to democracy in East Africa, an area of the world that rarely gets sustained coverage."
Mike Hixenbaugh, Antonia Hylton, Frannie Kelley, Reid Cherlin and Julie Shapiro of NBC News, for 'Southlake', a riveting and insightful account of an anti-Critical Race Theory movement in a Texas community, a phenomenon that has reverberated through school districts across the country.

=== Letters, drama, and music ===
Drama
**James Ijames**, **Fat Ham**
Kristina Wong, Sweatshop Overlord
Sylvia Khoury, Selling Kabul

Music
**Raven Chacon, Voiceless Mass**
Seven Pillars, by Andy Akiho
with eyes the color of time, by Anne Leilehua Lanzilotti

History
**Covered with Night, by Nicole Eustace (Liveright/Norton)**
**Cuba: An American History, by Ada Ferrer (Scribner)**
Until Justice Be Done: America's First Civil Rights Movement, from the Revolution to Reconstruction, by Kate Masur (W. W. Norton & Company)

Poetry
**frank: sonnets by Diane Seuss (Graywolf Press)**
Refractive Africa: Ballet of the Forgotten, by Will Alexander (New Directions)
Yellow Rain, by Mai Der Vang (Graywolf Press)

General Nonfiction
**Invisible Child: Poverty, Survival & Hope in an American City, by Andrea Elliott (Random House)**
Home, Land, Security: Deradicalization and the Journey Back from Extremism, by Carla Power (One World/Random House)
The Family Roe: An American Story, by Joshua Prager (W. W. Norton & Company)

Biography
**Chasing Me to My Grave: An Artist's Memoir of the Jim Crow South, by the late Winfred Rembert as told to Erin I. Kelly (Bloomsbury)**
Pessoa: A Biography, by Richard Zenith (Liveright/Norton)
The Doctors Blackwell: How Two Pioneering Sisters Brought Medicine to Women and Women to Medicine, by Janice P. Nimura (W. W. Norton & Company)

Fiction
**The Netanyahus: An Account of a Minor and Ultimately Even Negligible Episode in the History of a Very Famous Family, by Joshua Cohen (New York Review Books)**
Monkey Boy, by Francisco Goldman (Grove Press)
Palmares, by Gayl Jones (Beacon Press)

== Special citation ==
A special citation was awarded to the journalists of Ukraine for their coverage of the 2022 Russian invasion of Ukraine. The citation reads:

The Pulitzer Board awards a special citation to the journalists of Ukraine for their courage, endurance, and commitment to truthful reporting during Vladimir Putin's ruthless invasion of their country and his propaganda war in Russia. Despite bombardment, abductions, occupation, and even deaths in their ranks, they have persisted in their effort to provide an accurate picture of a terrible reality, doing honor to Ukraine and to journalists around the world.

== Reception ==
Tom Jones of Poynter was unsurprised by the recognition of The New York Times and The Washington Post, which he described as "what seems like an annual rite of passage". He highlighted the success of local outlets such as the Tampa Bay Times and said Quanta Magazine's win for explanatory reporting was "what might be the most unexpected — and again that doesn't mean undeserved — prize of the day". Of the process he wrote, "I'm struck by how the Pulitzer Prize judges took their responsibility with the utmost diligence — recognizing a wide array of outlets and journalists. And congratulations to the Pulitzer juries for trimming down each category to finalists that were as varied as they were strong." He called the omission of The Wall Street Journal's Facebook Files a snub.

Remarking on the new category of Illustrated Reporting and Commentary, The Beat writer Heidi MacDonald said that the revamped category "says much about the state of media and cartooning", and "gives room to consider longer works... even on beyond to TikTok, in theory".

On May 11, 2022, two days after Pulitzer Prizes were awarded to The New York Times and Los Angeles Times photojournalist Marcus Yam for their coverage of the regime change in Afghanistan, The Diplomat published an article criticizing media coverage of the country and noted that violence was in fact rising in Afghanistan, stating "Afghanistan may have fallen out of international headlines, but violent trends are once again on the rise" and that there was currently "intense infighting between various Taliban factions and interests." Data collected by The Diplomat's affiliates at Afghan Peace Watch (APW) and Armed Conflict Location & Event Data Project (ACLED) showed that violence in Afghanistan escalated between September 2021 and March 2022. The same day, American Prospect reporter Emran Feroz stated that "the War on Terror continues" and noted that foreign drones were still operating in the country.
