= Amit Dave =

Pulitzer Prize winning Indian photojournalist

- Born: Ahmedabad, India
- Occupation: Photographer
- Employer: Reuters
- Known for: 2022 Pulitzer Prize for Feature Photography
- Website: https://widerimage.reuters.com/photographer/amit-dave

Amit Dave is a photographer based in Gujarat, India. He has been a part of Reuters' Pulitzer Prize-winning photography team that covered COVID-19 pandemic in India.

== Biography ==
Amit Dave was born in Ahmedabad in Gujarat. He is a photojournalist working for Reuters.

== Career ==
Amit Dave is a senior photojournalist for Reuters, based in Ahmedabad in India. Before working with Indian Express, he worked as a photographer in state's magazine and a local newspaper in Gujarat. He joined Reuters in 2002. Apart from his work covering COVID-19 pandemic in India for which he won the Pulitzer, Amit also known for capturing events such as the 2001 Gujarat earthquake, 2002 Gujarat riots and 2004 Indian Ocean earthquake and tsunami in South India.

== Awards ==
Amit Dave won the Pulitzer Prize for feature photography in 2022 and shares the award with Reuters photojournalists Adnan Abidi, Sanna Irshad Mattoo, and Danish Siddiqui.
