= Abdullah Tari =

Indian Islamic scholar and political activist (1939–2026)

Mowlana Mohammad Abdullah Tari (1939 – 8 March 2026) was an Indian Islamic cleric and former president of Jamiat Ahle Hadith Jammu and Kashmir (1986–1989). He was also a political activist who served as a general secretary of the separatist political party the Jammu and Kashmir Democratic Freedom Party. He served as the party's acting chairman during the imprisonment of the party's chairman Shabir Shah. He was a member of the All Parties Hurriyat Conference.

Tari died following a prolonged illness on 8 March 2026, at the age of 86.
