= Sanaullah Bhat =

Indian journalist from Kashmir (1922–2009)

- Born: 14 November 1922
- Died: 25 November 2009 (aged 87); Sher-i-Kashmir Institute of Medical Sciences, Jammu and Kashmir, India
- Occupation: Journalist
- Notable work: Daily Aftab

Sanaullah Bhat (14 November 1922 – 25 November 2009), also known as Khawaja Sonaullah Bhat, was an Indian journalist, author and columnist who wrote in Urdu. He was the founding editor of the Daily Aftab, a newspaper in Jammu and Kashmir. He is considered to be the father of the press in Kashmir. He wrote several books, including Ahd nāmah-yi Kashmīr.

== Life and career ==
Sanaullah Bhat was born on 14 November 1922. His journalism career began in 1953 when he founded a weekly newspaper named Kashmir that was published from Muzaffarabad, Azad Kashmir.

In 1957, Bhat began publishing Aftab, a daily Urdu newspaper, and was its editor for over 40 years. He contributed the column Khazar Sochta Hai Wular Ke Kinare (transl. Khizer thinks at the banks of Wular) to the newspaper. The Aftab was registered with the Indian Registrar of Newspapers in 1965. The role of Aftab in Kashmiri journalism has been called exceptional.

Bhat is thought to be the first to use offset printing for a newspaper in Jammu and Kashmir. The Indian Express credits him with bringing photo journalism to the state. He has been described as the "father of journalism" in Kashmir. On the thirteenth anniversary of his death, Farooq Abdullah called him a devoted objective journalist and "the one who introduced street sale of newspapers" there. Omar Abdullah, a former Chief Minister of Jammu and Kashmir, described him as a pioneer of journalism in Kashmir. According to Shabir Shah, the founder of Jammu and Kashmir Democratic Freedom Party, analysing the Kashmir politics and presenting "it in the backdrop of subcontinent" was Bhat's routine affair work.

In 1975, Bhat was elected the first president of Kashmir Press Club. He died on 25 November 2009 at Sher-i-Kashmir Institute of Medical Sciences, in Soura, Srinagar.

== Publications ==
Bhat's works include:

- Kashmir In Flames: An Untold Story of Kashmirʼs Political Affairs. Srinagar: Ali Mohammad. 1981. OCLC 10149952.
- ʻAhd nāmah-yi Kashmīr
- Kashmīr, 1947 se 1977 tak [Kashmir, from 1947 until 1977] (in Urdu). Je. Ke. Āfsaṭ Prinṭar. 1980. OCLC 8689496.

== Further ==
- The founder of "Aftab", Khwajah Saheb
