= Arlington International Film Festival =

Film festival in Massachusetts, United States

- Location: Arlington, MA
- Founded: 2010
- Festival date: Annually, in November
- Language: International
- Website: http://www.aiffest.org/

The Arlington International Film Festival (AIFF) is an annual nonprofit film festival dedicated to promoting and increasing multicultural awareness and showcases world cinema and independent films in their original language with English subtitles. Independent film producers, directors and actors within the US and abroad are invited to participate in engaging panel discussions and Q&A sessions after the screenings. Each year the festival greets more than 2,000 movie aficionados and shows about fifty films from all over the world with an impressive lineup of premieres. The Arlington International Film Festival also includes a year-round events such as poster contest competitions (the AIFF's logo was designed by Marley Jurgensmeyer, winner of the 2012 poster contest competition), pre-festival screenings and art exhibitions with local artists and performances by musicians, singers and dancers.

== History ==
The Arlington International Film Festival was founded in 2010 by April Ranck and Alberto Guzman, in the aim of exploring and promoting the cultural diversity through the lens of independent films in a wide range of topics and areas. Jumping from 53 submissions the first year to over 142 the following year, the festival has been a significant success and attracts many enthusiast moviegoers. Hundreds of submissions are now watched by AIFF's Selection Committee each year and many of the selected films have been nominated for Academy Awards, while others have been purchased by CNN, POV PBS and Nova. The festival was held during four consecutive years at the historic Regent Theatre in Arlington.
In 2015, the festival took place at the Kendall Square Cinema, Massachusetts.
In 2016, the annual festival returned to his home city in Arlington, and was held at the Capitol Theater, in Arlington, Massachusetts. The number of films submissions continues to increase with a strong participation of filmmakers as well as a growing audience.
For its 10th anniversary, Arlington Int’l Film Festival, like many others, was hit by the devastating COVID-19 pandemic in the United States. There was no red carpet to walk, but instead an Online Festival was held from November 5 to November 15, 2020, in partnership with the social-media marketing company HappsNow and the streaming platform Xerb.tv. In lieu of in person interviews, filmmakers were invited to make an introduction prior to their film being screened and more than hundred films, documentary and narrative features including shorts plus two programs of animation shorts were screened during the 2020 year's festival. Once again, AIFF welcomed high school students. This program named: “Voices of Our Youth” wrapped up a collection of nearly 60 shorts films.
In 2021, given the Covid 19 situation, with safety in mind, the Festival was still virtual for another year. But yet, AIFF was able to fulfill its mission and offered a good selection of films.
On November 3, 2022, the AIFF was glad to be back at the Capital Theater to host its 12th annual Festival. From November 3, to November 5, 2023, the annual festival showcased more than 40 films, documentaries and shorts at the Capitol Theater. Some of them being chosen for a world-wide tour and nominated for Academy Award.

In 2024 the festival was sold to Jaina Cipriano, a Boston filmmaker.

In 2026 the Arlington International Film Festival rebranded to Finding Bright Film Festival.

== Highlights ==
In 2014, the "Martin Luther King Community" awarded AIFF for spreading diversity and awareness of African-American culture, In 2012, the AIFF received the Year Award from the Arlington Chamber of Commerce, and in 2013, the Mc Clennen Community Arts Award from Arlington Center for the Arts in recognition for building community, as well as the Gold Star Award from the Massachusetts Cultural Council for its 2013 poster contest. In January 2014, in conjunction with the Visual Art Department of the Arlington High School, AIFF brought artist Winfred Rembert for a 5-day residency. AIFF has also partnered with the Boston Environmental Film Festival, Museum of Fine Arts, Boston, and Boston Irish Film Festival. In addition, AIFF worked with the filmmaker Alice Rotchild, of documentary Voices Across the Divide, which co-won the Boston Palestine Film Festival's ‘2013 Audience Award for Best Film. Two films: Botso: The Teacher from Tbilisi and Elena that were showcased at the Arlington International Festival in 2014 were among the 134 features nominated in the 'Documentary Feature' category at the 87th Academy Awards. For the 9th annual festival, AIFF launched a new award: "Audience Choice Awards, sponsored by Spy Pond Productions. These awards were named in honor of Fran Ranck Tood, who passed in the spring of 2019. He was a faithful supporter and ambassador of the AIFF.

== Categories ==
The screenings include feature length and short films in narrative, documentary and animation categories. Showings emphasize multiculturalism. The Arlington International Film Festival is a juried festival. College and High school students are also included.

== Festival awards ==
=== 2023 Festival Awards ===
Audience Choice Feature Award:
- "Patrick and the Whale", a documentary directed by Mark Fletcher, Austria, 2022.

Other Awards & Recognition:

- Best Documentary award at the Riviera International Film Festival; Best Overall Feature at The Harbor Film Festival, Grand Prize for the best Nature Documentary at the Innsbruck Nature Film Festival. Including various nominations.

Audience Choice Short Award:
- "Seeds Of Change", a documentary written and directed by Maximilian Armstrong, 2023, USA.

Other Awards & Recognition:

- Best Maine Film and Best Short Feature at the Maine Outdoor Film Festival

Best of Festival:
- "To Which We Belong.". A documentary directed by Pamela Tanner Boll & Lindsay Richardson, 2021, USA.

Other Awards & Recognition:

- Special Jury Award for Spirit of Activism at the Livable Planet Film Festival; 2021 Audience Award Sustainability cinema at the Maui Film Festival; 2022 Best Documentary at the Durango Independent Film Festival.

Best Documentary Feature :
- "The Palmnicken Tragedy". A documentary directed by Andrey Proskuryakov, and produced by Anna Adamskaya and Anastasia Velskaya, 2022, Germany/Russia/Israel. USA Premiere.
Best Documentary Short:
- "Resistance, Ancestral Spirit,". A documentary directed by Juven Arcadio Piranga Valencia, 2021, Columbia. USA Premiere.

Best Narrative Feature:
- "Two Lives in Pittsburg". A documentary written and directed by Brian Silverman, 2022, CA, USA. East Coast Premiere.

Best Narrative Short:
- "Estrellas Del Desierto (Desert lights)", directed by Katherina Harder Sacre; and produced by Francisca Urrutia, 2022, Chile. MA Premiere

Other Awards & Recognition:

- This film received other festival awards, including at: Tribeca Film Festival; Havana Film Festival; Milwaukee International Film Festival; Festival Internacional de Curtas Metragens de São Paulo; Festival de Cine Iberoamericano de Huelva.

Best Animation Short:
- "Discussion Animée entre entendeurs de voix(An Animated Discussion Between Voices Hearers)", written and directed by Tristan Phil, 2023, France. East Coast Premiere.

Other Awards and Recognitions:

- At: Festival Tous Courts d’Aix en Provence; Palm Spring International ShortFest; Côté Court Festival; Champs Elysées Film Festival; Festival du Cinéma de Douarnenez; La fête Du Court Métrage.

Best Experimental Short:
- "Night Owls". A short Romance Film written, produced and directed by Gabrielle Rosson, founder of GR Film, 2022 USA/MA. Boston Premiere.

Outstanding Massachusetts Filmmakers Awards:
- "Powering Puerto Rico". A Short Documentary directed by Adam Fischer, 2022, MA, USA. Award Sponsored by High Output.

Other Awards and Recognitions:

- Best of Festival, Best Director, Best Documentary Short, and Best Editing at Richmond International Film Festival.

- "Waiting To Continue: The Venezuelan Asylum Seekers on Martha’s Vineyard". A documentary directed by Ollie Becker, Tom Ellis, and Tim Persinko, 2023, MA, USA. Boston Premiere. Award Sponsored and Best Cinematography by RULE Camera Boston.
- "(de) Vice Grip". A Short Experimental directed by Padrick Sean Ritch, 2022, MA, USA. Award Sponsored by: Talamas.

STUDENTS AWARDS VOICES OF OUR YOUTH.

Best of Festival:
- "A Lost Sense". A Sci-Fi, Drama, Comedy, directed by Cole Paul, N.Attleboro, 2023, MA, USA. Sponsored by Leslie Ellis School, Arlington MA.
Best Documentary:
- "Ce Moment", a documentary by Cecilia Liu, 2022, St George School, China. USA Premiere. Sponsored by Urban Media Arts, Malden, MA.
Best Narrative:
- "All The Time In the World" by Ava Shea Lorch, 2023, USA. Sponsored by Arlington Community Media, Inc., Arlington, MA.
Best Animation:
- "Water Lullaby". A sand animated film by Piotr Kazmierczak, 2022, Poland. USA Premiere. Sponsored by Kumon, Arlington, MA.

Honorable Mentions:

- "How Was Your Summer". A narrative by Michael Francis Dailey, Lowell High School, 2023, Ma, USA.
- "Fitting In". A Narrative by Mark Leschinsky Bergen County Academies, 2023, Hackensack, NJ, USA. New England Premiere.
- Un Sabor Mágico (A Magical Taste)". A documentary by Belen Moras, 2022, Punta del Este High School, Uruguay. USA Premiere.
- The Notebook". A narrative by Esabella A.K. Strickland, 2019, Vancouver, Canada. Massachusetts Premiere.

=== 2022 Festival Awards ===
Audience Choice Feature Award:
- "On this Happy Note", a documentary directed by Tamar Tal Anati, 2021, Israel.

Other Award:

- Award of the Israeli Film Academy.

Audience Choice Short Award:
- "Doubt". A Narrative directed by Gokce Pekhamarat, 2022, Turkey, US Premiere.
Best of Festival:
- "Not a Tame Lion.". A documentary directed by Craig Bettendorf, USA, 2022, MA Premiere.

Best Documentary Feature: Honoring the Strength of Women:
- "How long must we wait", a documentary directed by Jaclyn O'Laughlin, 2021, Ma, USA.
Best Documentary Short:
- "Bicentennial Bonsai: Emissaries of Peace", a documentary directed by Paul Award and Kathryn O'Sullivan, USA, 2020, New England Premiere.

Best Narrative Feature:
- "Klondike", a docu/drama written and directed by Maryna Er Gorbac, 2022, Ukraine, East Coast Premiere.

Awards: Best International Feature Film at the Sundance Film Festival.

Best Narrative Short:
- "An Insured Life", a comedy directed by Jesús Martínez Nota, 2020, Spain.

Other Awards:

Best Comedy Film at Certamen de Cortos Visualia, Spain; Special Mention at Mediterraneo Festival Corto, Italy; Best Actress at Festival Internazionale Inventa un Film, Italy; Best Actress at CICOM, Concurso Internacional de Cortos de Murchante, Italy; Special Mention at 23rd Faludi International Film Festival, Hungary; First Jury Award at Festival de Cine de Cartagena, Spain; Best Actress at Donosskino, Festival de Cortometrajes de Donostia, Spain; Best Actress at Festival Internacional de Cortometrajes sobre Personas Mayores, Spain; Best Actress at SicilyFarm Film Festival 2020 - Film Festival Agrigento, Italy; Best Short at VII Certamen Cortos Cádiar, Spain; Best Short at 2020 Corto e a Capo, Spain; Best Actress at Festival de Cine de Comedia de Tarazona y el Moncayo, Spain; Best Actress at VI Festival de Cortos de Carabanchel, Spain; Audience Award at Festival de Cine Itinerante por El Bierzo, 38Retinas festival, Spain

Best Animation:
- "Navozande, le musicien (The Musician)", a short written and directed by Reza Riahi. 2020, France.

- Official Selections at Tribeca Film Festival; Hong Kong world international Film Festival; Sonoma International Film Festival, Saint Louis International Film Festival, Anima Brussels; Clermont Ferrand; Stuttgart International Festival of Animated Film.

Other Award: Best Animated Short at the Tribeca Film Festival.

Best Experimental:
- "How To be Not Perfect", a documentary directed by David Sarkissian, 2022, Armenia, East Coast Premiere.

Outstanding Massachusetts Filmmakers Awards:
- "Pony Boys", a documentary directed by Eric Stange, 2022, MA, USA.
- "Nothing Is Going To Change", a short Narrative directed by Nicholas Burns. Ma, USA. MA Premiere.

Award: Emerging Filmmaker Award at the

- "Becoming Black Lawyers", a documentary directed by Evangeline M. Mitchell, 2022, Cambridge, MA, USA. Boston Premiere.

Other Awards: Best Short Documentary at Paris Int’l Film Awards, France; Best short Documentary at Hollywood South Urban Film Festival, Atlanta, GA; Outstanding Short Documentary at Greater Cleveland Urban Film Festival, Ohio; Best Film at Black Feedback Film Festival, U.S.; Award of Merit Special Mention at The IndieFEST Film Awards, La Jolla, CA; Outstanding Achievement Award Winner at World Film Carnival Singapore; Best Social Impact Documentary Short at Urban Mediamakers Festival, Atlanta, GA; Audience Choice Award at Topaz Film Festival Presented by Women in Film Dallas, Texas; Best Documentary Short at Montreal Int’l Black Film Festival; Best Doc at Huntington Beach Cultural Cinema Showcase, CA. Along with numerous Official Selection Screenings throughout the world.

STUDENTS AWARDS- VOICES OF OUR YOUTH.

Best of Festival:
- "I have a Dream, a Movie Dream" a docufiction by ShiJie Weng, 2021, Spain. World Premiere
Best Documentary:
- "Shelved"a documentary by Max Mitchell. Steeltown Film Academy, 2021, Pittsburgh, PA, USA. New England Premiere.
Best Historical Documentary:
- "The Bridge" a documentary by Shreya Mehta and Calvin Clizer. 2021. Sacramento, CA, USA. New England Premiere.
Best Narrative:
- "The Barn & The Birdhouse". A drama by Jack Malin, Murray Susen. Light House Studio Charlottesville, VA, USA, 2021, Mass Premiere.
Best Animation:
- "Caco" by Alba Carrera Marcolin, Spain, 2022, US Premiere. Sponsored by Lesley Ellis School, Arlington.
Best Experimental:
- "Internet" by Michael Cadena, Sophia Santamaria.Florida Film Institute, Miami, FL, USA,2021 MA Premiere .
Best Horror:
- "Stuffed" by Brendan Patrick Egan. Horror/Comedy, 2021, Boston, MA, USA. Mass Premiere.
'Best Director' and Technical Skills:
- "Distractions" a documentary by Maya Jai Pinson, Hyattsville, MD, USA. New England Premiere
Best Script:
- "Respectful Vampires of the Greater Boston Area" a documentary by Ari Klawans, 2022, Natick, MA, USA, Boston Premiere.
Best Sound:
- "The Hole", an animation by Piotr Kaźmierczak. Poland, 2021, USA Premiere.
Best Cinematography & Best Editing:
- "Inner Workings", a documentary by Cara Davidson. Sacramento, CA, USA, New England Premiere.

=== 2021 Festival Awards ===
Audience Choice Film Award
- "Enough! Lebanon's Darkest Hour", is a Documentary Feature by Daisy Gedeon. Australia/ Libanon.

Best of Festival:
- "I'm an electric Lampshade.", A docu-fiction by writer and director: John Clayton Doyle. USA.

Best Documentary Feature Sponsored by Irving House of Harvard:
- "Los Hermanos:The brothers". Co-Directors and producers Marcia Jarmel & Ken Schneider, a Peabody and Emmy-winning, and Oscar nominated editor. USA/Cuba.

Awards:

- Best Documentary Feature at the Woodstock Film Festival.
- Official Selections at IDA, Mill Valley Film Festival, Doc NYC Film Festival, Flicker Rhode Island International Film Festival, RiverRun International Film Festival, GlobeDocs Festival, Bend Film Festival, Mountainfilm and screened in many other festivals and local art houses.

Best Narrative Feature:
- "Jack London's Martin Eden". Written and Directed by Jay Craven, USA.

Awards:

- Best Film and Best Director at the Boston Film Festival.
- Official Selections at the St. Louis International Film Festival, Nantucket Film Festival, Woods Hole Film Festival.

Best Documentary Short:
- "Hunger Ward", nominated for the Academy Award for the best documentary short. Directed by Skye Fitzgerald. USA/Yemen.

Best Narrative Short:
- "The Last Jam Jar", inspired by a true story. Directed by Arpan Bahl. India.

- Official Selections: West Europe FF (Brussels, Belgium).

Best Animation Short- Sponsored by Real Gusto Ristorant & Pizzeria, Medford:
- "Times of Plenty", is the first episode of a series. Directed by Claudio Costa. Italy.

Awards:

- Willlachen Comedy & Satire Filmprize, The Golden Cellar Rattle (Wien Austria), Honorable' Mention: New Generation Film Festival (Belgrade, Serbia).
- Official Selections: David Donatello (Rome, Italy)

Best Experimental Short:
- "Woman" by Director, Producer and Choreographer Lilian Carter. East Coast Premiere. USA.

Awards:

- Best Experimental Film: La Sun Film Festival; Festigious Los Angeles Monthly Film Competition; Hong Kong Indie Film Festival; Roma Short Film Festival..
- Finalist: Tokyo International Short Film Festival, Japan; New Wave Short Film Festival, Munich, Germany.Red Movie Awards Finalist: Reims, France
- Official Selections: LA Indies Film Festival; Toronto International Woman Film Festival; Venice Shorts Film Festival; International Mobile Film Festival, San Diego, California, USA.

STUDENTS AWARDS - VOICES of OUR YOUTH

Best of Festival:
- "The Waltz of Time" by Mario Martinez Sáenz, Spain. US PREMIERE.

Awards:

- Guion Ganador del Concurso de Guiones de Cortometraje del Foro Audiovisual de Extremadura.

Best Narrative:
- "Bro" by CRITICS. Nigeria. Sponsored by Urban Media Art Malden, Ma, USA. US PREMIERE.
Best Documentary:
- "Every Body's Business" by Amilieyon Pridgen, Jessica Torres. Maysles Documentary Center, NYC, New York. MASS PREMIERE.
Best Animation:
- "Cloudy Dream" by Rayhaneh Einollahi and Bahareh Einollahi. Iran.US PREMIERE.
Best Historical Doc:
- "Taking a Seat For Justice: The 504 Sit-in" by Thomas Huang, Allen Tang, Andrew Wang, Andrew Yu, Rohin Garg. Winston Churchill High School, MD. US PREMIERE.
Best Experimental:
- "Elysium" by Ariana Jones, Ella Good. 2020. Smyrna, Georgia, USA.
- "Distortion (Verzerrung)" by Samuel J Punto. 2021. Germany. EAST COAST PREMIERE.

Awards:

- Indie Short Fest, Los Angeles, United States, 2021, Best Young Director & Latitude Film, London, United Kingdom, Silver Award, Experimental Short Film.

Best Musical:
- "Since Then" by BRJDC Residents. 2020. Light House Studio, Charlottesville, VA. USA. MASS PREMIERE.
Best Lightning:
- "From What You Left Behind" by Jodhi Ramsden-Mavric. 2020. Melbourne, Australia.
Best Cinematography:
- "Keep Your Head Up, Sweet Pea!" by Sophie Meissner. 2020.US/Germany. MASS PREMIERE.

Awards:

- Walla Walla Film Crush Film Fest -Nominated: Best Youth Short, Sydnie, Australia, 2020; Salt House Creative International Film Festival, winner: Best Actress, Sydney, Australia, 2020; Hollywood Verge Film Awards, Burbank, United States - Nominated "Best Student Short", 2020; Oz International Film Festival, honorable mention, Sydnie, Australia, 2021; The Scene Film Festival – online, Best Actress, US, 2021; Holidays 365 International Film Festival, virtual, Best Student Film, US, 2021.

=== 2020 Festival Awards ===
Best of Festival:
- "The place that makes us" by director and producer: Karla Murthy. USA. Karla Murthy is an Emmy Award-nominated producer.

Official selections:

- Woods Hole Film Festival, in Falmouth MA and won the prize for Emerging Documentary Filmmaker.
- River's Edge International Film Festival, Paducah, KY.

Best Documentary Feature:
- "Sockeye Salmon. Red Fish". Filmmakers Dmitriy Shpilenok and Vladislav Grishin. Russian Federation.

Other Awards:

- Award Excellence 2020 at the imdb Accolade Competition
- Award of Excellence at The Indie Fest Film Awards, in California
- Festival award at the Golden Door Film Festival, in New Jersey.
- Best Documentary Feature at the Film at Lincoln Center, the New York Film Festival.
- Best Documentary at Eurovision Palermo Film Festival, in Italy
- Best Documentary Film at Florence Film Awards, in Italy
- Best Feature Documentary at Los Angeles Movie Award

Best Narrative Feature:
- "Omar and Us". Directed by Maryna Er Gorbach and Mehmet Bahadir Er. Turkey.

Other Awards:

- International Competition – Best Film, Best Script, Best Actor at South East European Film Festival, Paris, France.
- Ecumenical Jury Award at Warsaw Film Festival (World Premiere), Poland.
- Best Film & Best Director & Best Script Award at Malatya Int’l Film Festival, Turkey.
- Best Film Award at Santa Cruz Film Festival, Argentina.
- Dialog Award Nomination at Cottbus Film Festival, Germany.
- International Competition at Kolkata Film Festival, India.
- Best Actor at Fantasporto Film Festival, Porto, Portugal; Official Selection at Haifa Film Festival.

Best of Documentary Short:
- "Marked". Directed and written by Henry Ogunjimi. Nigeria. New England Premiere.

Official Selection at Afrika Film Festival.
Other Awards:

- Best Documentary at the Seattle Black Film Festival.

Best Animation Short:
- "Mother And Milk" by Ami Lindholm. Finland. US Premiere.

Best Experimental Short:
- "Floating World-Life" 1.0 by Dénes Ruzsa and Fruzsina Spitzer. Hungary.

HIGH SCHOOL STUDENTS FILMS AWARDS: "VOICES OF OUR YOUTH"

Best of Festival:
- "Sanctuary" by L-J Shen Filerman, Arlington, Ma, USA.
Best Documentary:
- "The Michigan Arctic Grayling Initiative" by Grace Bright and Grace Joo, Troy Athens, Michigan. USA. Official selection in several film festivals around the USA.
Best Sci-Fi/Animation Documentary:
- "Zoe" by Marta Krunić, Croatia.

Other Awards:

- Best Film at International Children's Film Festival Bangladesh.
- First place winner at Highway 61 Film Festival, USA (category "Student Short").
- Best cinematography at Garden State Film Festival, New Jersey, USA (category "Student Short").

Best Experimental:
- "Unmasked" by Sophia Quigley, Raw Ats Works, Lynn MA, US. Boston Premiere.
Best Narrative:
- "Rita" by Will Nordstrom, Palisades, California, US. New England Premiere.
Best Narrative-Experimental:
- "Dimitto" by Riley Foulk, Jago Gould, J rea, Chloe Rodriguez, Gabriel Zakaib; Light house Studio, Charlottesville, VA, US. New England Premiere.
Special Mentions:

- Best Script (Grand Jury Price):

- "A Day with Officer Shawnie" by Aidan Sevens, Vancouver, Canada, USA.

- Best lighting:

- "Hold on" by Blue Ridge Detention Center, Light House Studio, Charlottesville, VA. USA.

- Best Audio:

- "The Dream Café" by Shuqian Lyu, Shanghai, China.

- Best Creativity:

- "Lac-Note Intolerant" by Nathaniel Sackson, Ana Burman, Chantrea Anderson, Emma Kaufman-Horner, Mallory Greene, Max Mongosso, Omara English, Ian Phillips, Yutong Dai, Ouyang Xuanjie, Sarah Apple | Light House Studio, Charlottesville, VA. USA.

=== 2019 Festival Awards ===
The Audience Choice Awards for Best Feature:
- "Danseur" Directed and Produced by Scott Gormley, New York City. USA.

Other Awards:

- Grand Prize at Choreoscope International Dance Film Festival Choreoscope, International Dance Film Festival Barcelona; Social Relevant Film Festival New York Grand Prize Documentary Feature.

Best of Festival Feature & Academy Award Nominee:
- "American Mirror: Intimations of Mortality" Directed by Arthur Balder. USA.

Other Awards:

- Parajanov-Vartanov Awards (US) for Best Innovative Film, Best Cinematography and Best Composer: Mark Petrie.
- Best International Documentary at Fabrique du Cinéma Award (Italy).
- Best Art, Best Director and Supreme Jury Awardat Melbourne Documentary Film Festival nominated.
- Audience Award and Best Director at Ierapetra Documentary Film Festival, Greece.
- Golden Eagle Award for Best Film of 2019, Best Cinematography, Best Lead Actor and Best Original Score at European Cinematography Awards (Netherlands) nominated.

Best of Festival Festival Short:
- "Lifeboat". Nominated for the Oscar for Best Short Documentary. Directed by Skye Fitzgerald. Germany.

Other Awards:

- Best Doc Short at IDA (International Documentary Award).
- Best Director & Best Short at the Social Impact Media Award.
- Best Doc Short at the Woodstock Film Festival.
- Jury Award at the Traverse City Film Festival.
- Best Short at the Telluride Mountainfilm.
- Special Jury Price at the BendFilm.
- Best Doc Short at the Courage Film Festival.
- The Act Now Award at the Crested Butte Film Festival.
- Best Doc Short at the Dublin International Shorts Film Festival.
- The Audience award at the Sebastopol Documentary Film Festival.

Best Documentary Feature:
- "The Last American Colony" by award-winning director Bestor Cram and Mike Majoros. USA.

Best of Festival Documentary Short:
- "Imagining Future Cities" By Shugi Wang. USA Premiere.

Her previous documentary Awaken the Dragon for cancer survivors was screened as a finalist of HUA International Short Film festival in Los Angeles, London, Tokyo and China. Shugi Wang's other works also have been featured on channels such as NBC.

Best of Narrative Feature:
- "Thicker than Blood" by Anthony L. Williams. USA, New England Premiere.

Other Awards:

- Best Director at the Newark international Film Festival.

Best of Narrative Short:
- "Facing Mecca" Directed by Jan-Eric Mack. Switzerland. Boston Premiere.

Best of Animation Short:
- "Los Emigrantes". Directed by Andrés Llugany. Argentina. USA Premiere.

Other Awards:

- Best Animation Short, Press Award, Audience Award, and Best Screenplay at the Mirada Oeste National Film Festival (Argentina).

Best Experimental Short:
- "Wamin (The Apple)". By Katherine Nequado. Canada. USA Premiere.

Other Award:

Festival du Court Metrage de Clermont-Ferrand – Talent Tout Court Award, Quebec, Canada.

High Output Award to Local Filmmaker:
- "Path of the Daff". Feature documentary by Michael Piscitelli. USA/Netherland. Boston Premiere. USA.

Other Award:

Best Documentary in Valley Film Festival, Los Angeles, CA, USA.

Rule Boston Camera Award to Local Filmmaker:
- C"lass Of 84". Short animation by Alex Salsberg & Joe Andrade. USA.

Talamas Boston Award to Local Filmmaker:
- "Artes Liberales". Feature documentary by Dr. Chen Cheng. USA. Canada Premiere.

Students Division Awards:

Best of Festival:
- "Social Cinema" by Carolina Sánchez. Spain.
Best Short Documentary:
- "Changing the narrative"by Christian Means, Deonte Johnson, JaQuavion Gaines, Juliani Robinson. Light House Studio. Charlottesville. VA. USA.
Best Short Narrative:
- "A Wake-Up Call"By Alex Dekelbaum. Dallas. USA.
Best Short Animation:
- "Margo"by Amelia Maxham, Libby Slaughter, Ben Clark, Summers Worthington, Johnny Krosby-Groner, Jhael J. Rasheed, Victoria Stiefvater, Conrad Heins, Nicholas Tennery, Jago Gould. Light House Studio, Charlottesville, VA. USA.
Best Short Experimental:
- "Discoveries: Awakening" by Noah Semeria. Chicago, Illinois. USA.
Honorable Mention:
- "A Journey to Acceptance" by Sami Dowd. Swampscott, MA. USA.
Honorable Mention:
- "Shrink" by Kayla Jorgensen. Hyannis, MA. USA.

=== 2018 Festival Awards ===
Best of Festival Feature:
- "Skidrow Marathon". Directed by Mark Hayes & Gabrielle Hayes. USA.

The film has received 18 awards from 12 different film festivals.

Best of Festival Documentary short:
- "Are you Volleyball?". Directed by Mohammad Bakhshi. Iran. This documentary won 21 awards.

Best Short Documentary:
- "Whirlwind", An history of black Tennis in America. Directed by Samantha Smith. USA.

Best Narrative Feature:
- "Die Beste aller Welten" (The Best of All Worlds). Directed by Adrian Goiginger. This film is based on true events.

Best Short Narrative:
- "Violin". Directed, produced and written by Konstantin Fam. Russia. This film is the final part of a trilogy about Holocaust history.

Best Short Animation:
- "Good Boy". Directed by Rachel Beltran. USA.

Best historical Documentary:
- "Crows of the Desert". A Hero's Journey through the Armenian Genocide. Directed, produced and written by Marta Houske. USA. This documentary has received 12 awards and 4 nominations from different international film festivals.

Students Division Awards:

Best of Festival:
- "Violence in Baltimore". Produced and directed by Emerson students: Brooke Anderson, William Coles, Katia Crawford, Marc Cruise, Jayla Elliott, Joelle Faison, Kailah Hall, Michelle Hill, Eric Hunter, William Mitchell, Sama Muhammad, Ade Ogunshina, Eva Ojekwe, Brian Thompson, Ayanna White. Baltimore. MD. Wide Angle Youth Media.
Best Short Documentary:
- "Needles and Threats". Produced and directed by Emerson students: Alyssa Abreu, Moises Vargas & Anisa Hamilton. NYC. Maysles Documentary Center.
Best Short Experimental:
- "Irony". Produced and directed by Perth Modern School & Curtin University student: Radheya Jegatheva. Australia.
Best Short Animation:
- "Trejur" (pronounced: Treasure). Produced and directed by Emerson student: Thomas Kim. Concord MA.

Local Filmmakers & Next Generation Of Filmmakers Awards:

- "Rule Boston Camera: Speak To Me". Directed by Nicolas Thilo-McGovern.
- "Talamas Boston: Awaken The Dragon Together". Directed by Shuyi Wang.
- "High Output : Yin Yu Tang". Directed by Vivianna Yan. Official Selection: HUA International Short Film Festival.

Microsoft Awards. Special Recognition to:

- "The Art Collector". Produced and directed by Emerson student: Saoirse Loftus-Reid. Lexington, MA.
- "Undocumentary". Produced and directed by Emerson student: Karla Cortes. Somerville, MA. World Premiere.

=== 2017 Festival Awards ===
Best of Festival:
- "Chasing Trane", John Scheinfeld: Director. USA. The film is produced with the full participation of the Coltrane family and the support of the record labels that collectively own the Coltrane catalog. The documentary narrated by Denzel Washington, features interviews with: Bill Clinton, Carlos Santana, Common, Cornel West, and many more. Official selections of the Toronto International Film Festival (TIFF), the Telluride Film Festival, the International Documentary Film Festival Amsterdam (IDFA), and the Doc NYC Film Festival (DOCNYC).

Best Narrative Feature:
- "You Have a Nice Flight", Jimmy Dinh: Director. USA. The film has received 8 Awards, 21 Official Selections, and 17 Nominations. In July 2017: Shelley Dennis won an Actor Award for the Best Actress for the comedy: You Have a Nice Flight. The comedy has also received the Award of Outstanding Achievement at the Calcutta International Cult Film Festival.

Best Documentary Feature:
- "A Courtship", Amy Khon: Director. USA.

Best of Festival Short Film:
- "Sisak", Faraz Ansari: Director, India. Winner Best International Film. Winner Best Overall Short, Best Film at Mosaic Int’l South Asian Film Festival, Mississauga, Ontario.

Best Narrative Short Film:
- "Fist of People", Dong-ki An: Director. South Korea.

Best Documentary Short Film:
- "Phil's Camino", Annie O'Neil: Director. USA. This documentary has won 16 out of 25 festivals. World premiere at the SXSW Int’l Film Festival and Winner of the Best Short Doc at numerous film festivals. Officially submitted to The Academy for Oscar Nomination at the 89th Academy Awards.

Best Animation Short Film:
- "Au Revoir Balthazar", Rafael Sommerhalder: Director. Switzerland. This animated short film won many international awards including: the Best of the World Award at Hiroshima International Animation Festival.

Students Division Awards:

Best of Festival Short Film:
- "A Roll Call", Ben Reingold: Director. Sharon, MA.
Best Narrative Short Films:
- "Rosa", Roni Rolsgrove: Director. Boston, MA. ICA.
- "Loop", Stephen Gentry, Ryan Beard & Eli Hall: Directors. Charlottesville, VA. World Premiere.
Best Documentary Short Film:
- "After Freddie Gray, What Now?", Victor Able, Tayvon Cole, Katia Crawford, William Mitchell, Niajea Randolph, and Kailah Hall: Directors. Baltimore, MD.
Best Animation Short Film:
- "Washed Away", Madysen Yamamoto and Marina Kyle: Directors. San Francisco, CA.
Special Recognition Documentary Short:
- "What Piano District", Annmarie Soba: Director. New York City. World Premiere.

=== 2016 Festival Awards ===
Best of Festival:

- "East LA Interchange", Betsy Kalin: Director. USA. East Coast Premiere. Winner of the Award of Excellence IndieFest Film Awards; Best Feature New Urbanism Film Festival; 1st place jury award Frozen River Film Festival; Best Doc Los Angeles Jewish Film Festival.

Best Narrative Feature:

- "Climas", Enrica Pérez: Director. Peru. USA Premiere. Premiered at the Warsaw Film Festival. Official Selection of the Festival del Nuevo Cine Latinoamericano de Cuba; Epic Award for upcoming Filmmakers at the Festival de Cine de Lima.

Best Documentary Feature:

- "Jiàoliàn [coach]", Esteban Argüello: Director. Official Selection of the Sebastopol Doc Fest; Ethnography Festival, Paris; D.C Asian American FF. Washington DC and Frozen River Film Festival.

Best Documentary Short Film:

- "The time of the Luthiers", Jorge Guerrero: Director. Spain. USA Premiere.

Best Narrative Short Film:

- "EDÉN Hostel", Gonzaga Manso: Director. Spain. New England Premiere.

Best Animation Short Film:

- "The Day of the Bleeding Gums", Dimitar Dimitrov-Animiter: Director. Bulgaria. New England Premiere.

Official Selection at the Seattle International Film Festival and Vancouver International Film Festival.

HIGH SCHOOL DIVISION AWARDS: Best of Festival:

- "Attached At the Soul", William Leon: Writer/Director. USA, CA

Best Documentary Short:

- "Todo tiene su tiempo/ Everything Has Its Time", Marylys Merida: Director. USA, MA.

Best Narrative Short:

- "Teach Me Fish", Asa Minter: Director. USA, MA.

Best Experimental Short:

- "I don't need U", Alyssa Peguero: Director. USA, MA.

Special Presentation from this year's Harvard College Film Festival:

- "The Flag", Director: Tyler S.Parker. USA, South Carolina. Best Documentary - Best Direction (Documentary) - Best Editing (Documentary) - Best Sound Editing (Documentary) at Harvard College Film Festival 2016.

=== 2015 Festival Awards ===
Best of Festival:

- "Gabo: The Creation of Garcia Marquez", produced by Justin Webster. France.

Best Narrative Feature:

- "How Not To Disappear Completely", produced by Stuart J. Parkins, Director. U.K. USA PREMIERE.

Best Documentary Short Film:

- "A Chance To Dress", Produced by Alice Dungan Bouvrie. USA
- Tashi & The Monk, produced by Andrew Hinton & Johnny Burke, Directors. MA, US.

Best Fiction Short Film':

- "Kresnik: The Lore of Fire", produced by David SIPOŠ, Slovenia.

Best Animated Short Film':

- "Bendito Machine", produced by Jossie MALIS, Director. Spain, New England Premiere.

COLLEGE AWARDS 'Best of Festival:

- "Adagio", Kevin Wolf, Director. CA.

HIGH SCHOOL DIVISION AWARDS: Best of Festival:

- "Jordan", Katie Russel, Director. Raw Art Works, MA

Best Experimental:

- "Inhibited", Alexia Salingaros, Director, TX

Best Animation:

- "Luminosity", Alexia Salingaros, Director, TX

Best Documentary:

- "Picking up the Pieces", Joshua Tebeau, Director, Poland

Best Narrative:

- "Queen", Arvonne Patterson, Director, MA.

=== 2014 Festival Awards ===
Best of Festival:

- "Elena" directed by Petra Costa and produced by Busca Vida Filmes.

Best Documentary:

- "Botso": The Teacher from Tbilisi, directed by Tom Walters.

Best Narrative:

- "The Forgotten Kingdom", directed by Andrew Mudge.

Best Narrative Short:

- "The Man Who Fed His Shadow", directed by Mario Garefo.

Best Documentary Short:

- "Not Anymore", directed by Matthew VanDyke.

=== 2013 Festival Awards ===
Best Documentary:

- "The Iran Job" directed by Till Schauder.

Best Narrative:

- Clandestine Childhood directed by Benjamín Ávila.

Best Short:

- Baghdad Messi, directed by Shahim Omar Kalifa.

Best Documentary - High School Division Awards:

- La Lucha, directed by Tessa Tracy and Sophia Santos.

Best Narrative - High School Division Award:

- The Shingles, directed by Malcolm DC.

=== 2012 Festival Awards ===
Best of Festival:

- All Me: The Life and Time of Winfred Rembert directed by Vivian Ducat.

Best Documentary:

- Racing the Rez, directed by Brian Truglio.

Best Narrative:

- Consent, directed by Ron Farrar Brown.

Best of Festival & Best Documentary -High School Division Awards:

- La joie de vivre, directed by Jeremy Vassiliou.

Best Narrative - High School Division Award:

- Molineux, directed by Jacob Sussman.

High School Division Awards Best Animation - High School Division Awards:

- In Your Heart, directed by Raymond Caplin.

Best Experimental - High School Division Award:

- The Crown of life directed by Real Junior Leblanc.

=== 2011 Festival Awards ===
Best of Festival:

- Zero Percent, directed by Tim Skousen.

Best Documentary:

- We still live here directed by Anne Makepeace.

Best Narrative:

- Fuerteventura, directed by Mattias Sandström.

Best Short Film - High School Division Award:

- Nowhere Now Here, directed by Gaby Bruce.
