= Sanna Irshad Mattoo =

Indian photojournalist

- Born: Sanna Irshad Mattoo; Srinagar, Jammu and Kashmir, India
- Education: Central University of Kashmir
- Occupation: Photojournalist
- Awards: Pulitzer Prize for Feature Photography
- Website: sannaim.com

Sanna Irshad Mattoo (born 1993) is an Indian photojournalist based in Srinagar, Jammu and Kashmir. She won the 2022 Pulitzer Prize for Feature Photography.

== Career ==
Sanna Irshad Mattoo was born in the Srinagar district of the erstwhile Indian state of Jammu and Kashmir into a Kashmiri Muslim family. She studied Journalism at the Central University of Kashmir. In 2021, she became a Magnum Foundation Photography and Social Justice Fellow. She works for Reuters.

In 2022, Mattoo won the Pulitzer Prize for Feature Photography. She shared the award with fellow Reuters photojournalists Adnan Abidi, Amit Dave, and Danish Siddiqui. The citation for their prize indicated that it had been awarded for the work in documenting the impact of the COVID-19 pandemic in India.

In July 2022, Mattoo was barred from travelling out of India. She was stopped by immigration authorities at the Delhi Airport.

On 18 October 2022, Mattoo was again stopped from travelling to the US by immigration authorities at Delhi Airport. This time she was on her way to New York to receive the Pulitzer Prize. The Indian authorities did not provide any reason for the ban.

On 21 October 2022, the United States (US) has stated its commitment to press freedom by closely monitoring the case of Pulitzer Prize winner Sanna Irshad Mattoo. On Capitol Hill in Washington, DC, the case made an impression as well. The chairman of the House Intelligence Committee, US Congressman Adam Schiff, expressed his "disturbing" reaction to learning that Mattoo was unable to fly to accept the Pulitzer Prize and that "efforts to harass and silence the media" must stop.
