= The Iran Job =

- The official poster for The Iran Job, created by Iranian artist-in-exile Nicky Nodjoumi
- Directed by: Till Schauder
- Produced by: Sara Nodjoumi
- Starring: Kevin Sheppard
- Cinematography: Till Schauder
- Edited by: David Teague
- Music by: Shahin Najafi, Jadugaran, Reza Pishro, ZedBazi, A2
- Release date: June 15, 2012 (Los Angeles Film Festival)
- Languages: English, Persian
- Box office: $23,019

The Iran Job (Persian: کار ایران, romanized: Kâr Irân) is a documentary directed by Till Schauder and produced by Sara Nodjoumi about Kevin Sheppard, a professional American basketball player, as he plays in Shiraz, Iran for the A.S. Shiraz team (since renamed B.A Shiraz BC) in the Iranian Super League. The documentary was filmed in Iran in the winter of 2008–2009, a few months before the uprising of Iran's Green Movement.

Christiane Amanpour, Gloria Steinem, Maz Jobrani, Karim Sadjadpour, and executive producer Abigail Disney have expressed support for The Iran Job. In December 2011 the film was invited to a private, work-in-progress screening at the Carnegie Endowment for International Peace in Washington, D.C. moderated by Karim Sadjadpour.

On January 9, 2012 The Iran Job completed a 50-day crowdfunding campaign on Kickstarter that raised over $100,000. During its Kickstarter campaign, the film received press coverage from CNN International (on two occasions: a print article on December 23, 2011 and a TV interview that broadcast on January 5, 2012), The Washington Post, The Huffington Post, PBS FRONTLINE's Tehran Bureau, and IFP's Filmmaker magazine. Since the completion of its Kickstarter campaign, the film has received press from PBS' P.O.V. blog.

The Iran Job had its world premiere in the Documentary Competition of the Los Angeles Film Festival in June 2012 and it won the award for best documentary entry at the Arlington International Film Festival, Arlington, Massachusetts, in 2013. It has received positive reviews for its humanity and for successfully mixing genres from sports documentary to commentary about social and political climate in Iran, using Kevin's and his friends point of view.

After the world premiere, the filmmakers launched a 2nd Kickstarter campaign raising $66,105 for the subsequent self-release of the film.

In late 2012, Film Movement acquired the film for North American distribution and as of March, 2014, was available on all digital platforms, including Netflix.

In 2013, The Iran Job was short-listed for the Germany Academy Award.

== See also ==
- Kevin Sheppard
