= Till Schauder =

German-American filmmaker

- Born: 1971 (age 54–55)
- Other name: Till Terror
- Education: University of Television and Film Munich
- Occupations: Filmmaker, actor, teacher
- Spouse: Sara Nodjoumi
- Children: 2

Till Schauder (born 1971), is a German-American filmmaker, film director, screenplay writer, film producer, actor and film instructor. He lives in Brooklyn, New York with his wife and co-producer, Sara Nodjoumi.

== Early life ==
Schauder was born in Seattle, Washington to German parents. He moved back to Germany at age 2 and grew up in Göttingen, attending elementary, primary and high school. He left Germany at age 19 for an internship with Roger Corman’s film studio in Venice, California.

In 1992 he was accepted to the University of Television and Film Munich, from which he graduated with an M.A. degree in 1998.

== Film career ==
Till Schauder wrote and directed his first feature film, Strong Shit, at age 25 while still enrolled at the University for Television and Film Munich. The film, which stars German actor Sebastian Bezzel, tells the story of four drifting youngsters after the fall of the Berlin Wall. Strong Shit won the Max Ophuels Film Festival Jury Award in 1997. His second film, Santa Smokes, which he co-wrote, co-directed, and stars in won the Best Director Award at the Tokyo International Film Festival in 2003 and was nominated for the Grand Prix at the Tokyo International Film Festival in 2003. The film's female co-star Kristy Jean Hulslander won the Best Actress Award at the Tokyo International Film Festival in 2003. His third film, Duke’s House, starring Lars Rudolph, is a docu-drama about Duke Ellington’s former Harlem home, premiered at the Tribeca Film Festival in 2003. After his acting debut in Santa Smokes Schauder appeared as an actor in the HBO series Mildred Pierce, which was directed by Todd Haynes and stars Kate Winslet. He also appeared in a nationwide American Express commercial in 2008.

In 2012 he completed the documentary, The Iran Job, about American basketball player Kevin Sheppard’s experience playing professional basketball in Iran. The film, which features three young and outspoken Iranian women, has political and women’s rights undertones and a message of cultural and political conciliation. The film’s soundtrack features Iranian underground hip-hop and rap artists, most notably Shahin Najafi.

After journalist visas were declined, he filmed the film clandestinely, as a one-person team. The filming and the documentary’s timeline coincided with Iran’s revolutionary Green Movement. In 2008, during a production trip to Iran he was detained at Khomeini Airport in Tehran. He was sent back to New York 24 hours later. After two successful crowd-funding campaigns Schauder and his wife and co-producer Sara Nodjoumi completed the film in 2012. The Iran Job was executive produced by Abigail Disney. It premiered at the Los Angeles Film Festival in 2012 and has since played several film festivals around the world. The film, which received widespread domestic and international press attention, was a critical success. Journalists Steven O’Heir and Steph Wrath called The Iran Job a contender for The Academy of Motion Pictures Best Documentary Award. The film was theatrically released in the United States in fall 2012, and in Germany in 2013. It was shortlisted for the German Academy Award in 2014.

Schauder has gone on to direct the feature documentary, The Young Man and the Sea. In 2017, Schauder's feature documentary, When God Sleeps, premiered at the Tribeca Film Festival. The film tells the story of exiled Iranian musician Shahin Najafi, whose lyrics provoked the ire of high-ranking religious clerics in Iran. Najafi previously contributed to the soundtrack to The Iran Job, Schauder's 2012 documentary. When God Sleeps won the “Cinema for Peace Award” for Most valuable Documentary of the Year during the 2017 Berlinale, and the “Golden Heynal Award” in the International DocFilmMusic Competition at 57th Krakow Film Festival also in 2017. When God Sleeps opened theatrically in Germany and Japan in October 2017. His documentary Warriors of Faith (Glaubenskrieger) won a German Emmy for Best Documentary in 2017 and was nominated for the 2017 Prix Europa. When God Sleeps was shortlisted for the German Academy Award 2018.

Schauder teaches film classes at New York University, Vermont College of Fine Arts

== Filmography ==
Schauder filmography
Date	Title	Role(s)	Length	Notes
1996	City Bomber		23 minutes	
1998	Strong Shit		93 minutes	
2002	Duke's House		60 minutes	
2003	Santa Smokes	writer, producer, director, editor, actor	81 minutes	
2005	Galileo Mystery, Reincarnation		60 minutes	
2012	The Iran Job	director	90 minutes	Documentary about American basketball player Kevin Sheppard signed to play in Iran.
2015	The Young Man and the Sea		52 minutes	
2017	Warriors of Faith (Glaubenskrieger)		90 minutes	
2018	When God Sleeps		88 minutes	Documentary about musician Shahin Najafi, living in Germany.
2021	Ali Can: Der Mustermigrant	director	60 minutes	
2023	A Revolution on Canvas	co-director, writer	95 minutes	Featuring painter Nicky Nodjoumi

== Awards and honors ==
- 2018 Shortlisted for German Academy Award, Best Documentary; Vorauswahl Deutscher Filmpreis - When God Sleeps
- 2017 German Emmy Award, Best Documentary - bester Dokumentarfilm des Jahres, Deutschen Akademie Für Fernsehen - Warriors of Faith (Glaubenskrieger)
- 2017 Winner Jury Award, Minneapolis Music and Festival - 'When God Sleeps'
- 2017 Winner Golden Heynel Award, Best Music Documentary, 57th Krakow Film Festival - 'When God Sleeps'
- 2017 Winner Most Valuable Documentary of the Year, Cinema For Peace - 'When God Sleeps'
- 2016 Winner ARD Top of the docs Award -Warriors of Faith (Glaubenskrieger)
- 2014 Gerd Ruge Stipendium
- 2014 Shortlisted for German Academy Award, Best Documentary; Vorauswahl Deutscher Filmpreis - The Iran Job
- 2014 Winner Best Documentary Award, Arlington International Film Festival -The Iran Job
- 2014 Winner Guirlande D’Honneur, best documentary at "Sport Movies & TV - Milano International FICTS Fest" organized by the FICTS (Fédération Internationale Cinéma Télévision Sportifs) – The Iran Job
- 2003 Best Director Award, Tokyo International Film Festival - Santa Smokes
- 2003 Best Actress Award, Tokyo International Film Festival - Santa Smokes
- 2002 Studio Hamburg Newcomer Award granted by the Independent Panel of German Television and Film Producers (NDR, ARD, RTL, SAT 1) - Santa Smokes
- 1998 International Max Ophüls Film Festival Reader's Award - Strong Shit
