= Masrat Zahra =

Indian photojournalist (born 1993)

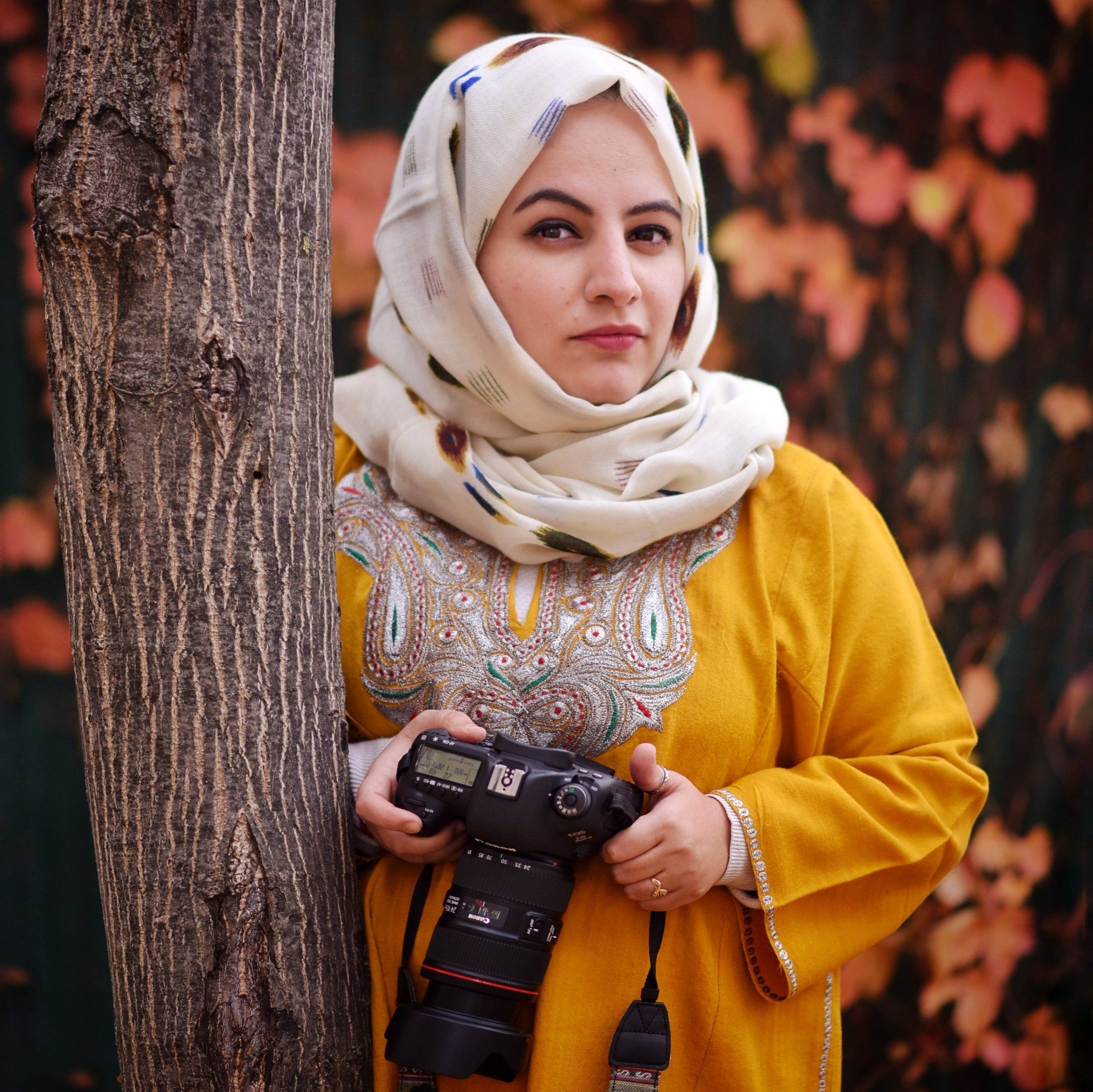
- Zahra in 2020
- Born: Masrat Zahra; 8 December 1993 (age 32); Srinagar, Jammu and Kashmir, India
- Citizenship: Indian
- Education: Central University of Kashmir
- Occupation: Photojournalist
- Awards: Anja Niedringhaus Courage in Photojournalism award; Peter Mackler Award for Courageous and Ethical Journalism 2020

Masrat Zahra (born 8 December 1993) is an Indian freelance photojournalist from Srinagar, Kashmir. She covers stories about local communities and women. She won the 2020 "Anja Niedringhaus Courage" in Photojournalism award from International Women's Media Foundation and the Peter Mackler Award for Courageous and Ethical Journalism 2020. She is married and settled in USA.

== Biography ==
Masrat Zahra was born on 8 December 1993 in Hawal neighbourhood of Srinagar, in the Kashmir Valley of Jammu and Kashmir, India, into a Kashmiri Muslim family. Her father is a truck driver and mother is a homemaker. She studied journalism at the Central University of Kashmir. She photographs the Kashmir conflict and her work has appeared in The Washington Post, The New Humanitarian, TRT World, Al Jazeera, The Caravan, The Sun, The News Arab, and The World Weekly. She experiences constant resistance based on her job and gender as she is one of a small group of female photojournalists in the region.

In April 2018, Zahra was labelled as a police informer after she shared an image from an encounter site on her Facebook. On 3 August 2019, before the clampdown in India's Jammu and Kashmir state, she was asked to submit work for Journalists Under Fire, an exhibition in New York City which was organised by United Photo Industries and St Ann's Warehouse in collaboration with Committee to Protect Journalists. On the same day, she was contacted by a French magazine for assignments with Real Kashmir F.C., a sports magazine. Due to a communications blackout that started on 5 August 2019, these offers could not be fulfilled. In April 2020, the Jammu and Kashmir Police named Zahra in an FIR under the Unlawful Activities (Prevention) Act, which is normally used for targeting terrorists. The police said they had been informed that Zahra was uploading "anti-national posts" to Facebook with "criminal intention to induce the youth", whereas she had only uploaded her published photographs. The move was condemned by 450 activists and scholars as an instance of targeting of journalists.

== Awards ==
In 2020, Zahra won the Anja Niedringhaus Courage in Photojournalism award from the International Women's Media Foundation. She was awarded with Peter Mackler Award for Courageous and Ethical Journalism 2020 for "telling [stories] of the women of Kashmir."

== See also ==
- Sanaullah Bhat
