= Nicky Nodjoumi =

American painter

- نیکزاد نجومی
- Born: Nikzad Nodjoumi; 1942 (age 83–84); Kermanshah, Imperial State of Iran
- Education: Tehran University; The New School; City College of New York
- Spouse: Nahid Hagigat (divorced)
- Relatives: Till Schauder (son in-law)

Nikzad Nodjoumi (Persian: نیکزاد نجومی; b. 1942), more commonly known as Nicky Nodjoumi, is an Iranian-born American fine art painter, printmaker, and illustrator who lives and works in Brooklyn, New York. His paintings address Iranian politics, history, power, and corruption.

== Early life ==
Nikzad Nodjoumi was born in 1942 in Kermanshah, Iran. In 1961, he began studying Fine Arts at the School of Fine Art at Tehran University and, in 1969, studied English at The New School in New York. He came to the United States in 1969 to undergo surgery in the Bronx for a congenital heart defect.

He married artist, Nahid Hagigat, in 1973. In 1974, he received his Master's degree in Fine Arts from the City College of New York.

== Career ==
After his studies, he returned to Iran and created artwork and posters that criticized the Shah's regime. During the Iranian Revolution, he was exiled from Iran, and by 1981, he had moved back to New York City.

His 2013 paintings from his show "Nicky Nodjoumi: Chasing the Butterfly and Other Recent Paintings" present an absurd mockery, with objects such as mullahs, men in suits, horses, and apes sharing canvas space with figures from classical Persian paintings.

Nodjoumi's artwork has been exhibited at various galleries and museums and is included in collections worldwide, including the Metropolitan Museum of Art in New York, the British Museum in London, the DePaul Art Museum in Chicago, and the National Museum of Cuba.

He is the subject of the documentary “A Revolution on Canvas" (2023), directed by Till Schauder and his daughter Sara Nodjoumi.
