= When God Sleeps =

- Directed by: Till Schauder
- Produced by: Till Schauder, Sara Nodjoumi
- Music by: Max Avery Lichtenstein
- Release date: 2017
- Running time: 88 minutes

When God Sleeps is a 2017 documentary directed by Till Schauder and produced by Schauder and Sara Nodjoumi. It centers around exiled Iranian musician Shahin Najafi, whose provocative lyrics resulted in Grand Ayatollah Lotfollah Safi Golpaygani and Grand Ayatollah Naser Makarem-Shirazi issuing separate fatwa against Najafi for apostasy.

The film premiered at the 2017 Tribeca Film Festival and received a German theatrical release beginning 12 October 2017.

== Plot ==
Taking place in Germany throughout 2015, the documentary focuses on Shahin Najafi's life in exile as he struggles to produce music and embark on a tour whilst under the constant threat of danger. His long-distance romance with Leili Bazargan, the granddaughter of Mehdi Bazargan, Iran's first Prime Minister following the Iranian Revolution, also complicates things due to his status as an outspoken critic of Islam.

== Cast ==
- Shahin Najafi as Himself
- Leili Bazargan
- Shahryar Ahadi
- Majid Kazemi
- Zahra Ashena
- Michael Krol
- Simon Scheibel
- M.C. Augusto Stahlke
- Nico Stallmann
- BenTai Trawinski

== Release ==
It had its world premiere at the Tribeca Film Festival on 20 April 2017 and also received a limited German theatrical release in select cities beginning 12 October 2017. Aside from Tribeca, the film has screened at Munich Film Festival, Kraków Film Festival, and the UNHCR Refugee Film Festival, among others. It is also an official selection for IDFA 2017, to take place starting 15 November.
