= Erin I. Kelly =

American philosopher and writer

Erin I. Kelly is an American philosopher and author. She is a professor of philosophy at Tufts University.

Her book Chasing Me to My Grave, which she co-wrote with the subject Winfred Rembert, won the 2022 Pulitzer Prize in Biography.

== Education and career ==
Kelly attended Stanford University (AB; 1984) and Columbia University (MA; 1987) and received her PhD from Harvard University (1995). She joined Tufts University in 1995, rising to full professor in 2018. She lists her academic interests as "justice, the nature of moral reasons, moral responsibility and desert, and theories of punishment".

== Selected works ==
=== Authored books ===
- Chasing Me to My Grave: An Artist's Memoir of the Jim Crow South. By Winfred Rembert, as told to Erin I. Kelly (Bloomsbury, 2021)
- The Limits of Blame: Rethinking Punishment and Responsibility (Harvard University Press, 2018)

=== Edited books ===
- John Rawls, Erin Kelly, ed. Justice as Fairness: A Restatement (Harvard University Press; 2001)

=== Articles ===
- Erin I. Kelly (2009). Criminal justice without retribution. The Journal of Philosophy 106 (8): 440–462 doi:10.5840/jphil2009106840
