= A Revolution on Canvas =

2023 American documentary film

- Official poster
- Directed by: Sara Nodjoumi; Till Schauder
- Produced by: Sara Nodjoumi; Till Schauder
- Cinematography: Till Schrader
- Edited by: Gretchen Hildebran; Simeon Hunter
- Music by: Sussan Deyhim
- Production companies: Partner Pictures; HBO Documentary Films
- Distributed by: HBO
- Release dates: June 11, 2023 (Tribeca); December 1, 2023
- Running time: 95 minutes
- Country: United States
- Languages: English; Persian

A Revolution on Canvas is a 2023 American documentary film, directed and produced by Sara Nodjoumi and Till Schauder. It follows Nicky Nodjoumi as he flees Iran in 1980, due to his controversial paintings at the Tehran Museum of Contemporary Art.

It had its world premiere at Tribeca Festival on June 11, 2023, and was released in a limited release on December 1, 2023, by HBO Documentary Films.

== Premise ==
In 1980, Nicky Nodjoumi flees Iran, due to his controversial paintings at the Tehran Museum of Contemporary Art. Decades later, Nodjoumi and his daughter, Sara, attempt to track down and reclaim the missing paintings.

== Release ==
The film had its world premiere at Tribeca Festival on June 11, 2023. It was released in a limited release on December 1, 2023. It premiered on HBO and streamed on Max on March 5, 2024.

== Reception ==
6.80 at Rotten Tomatoes
