= Shahnaz Bashir =

Kashmiri novelist

Shahnaz Bashir is a novelist and scholar of media and communication.

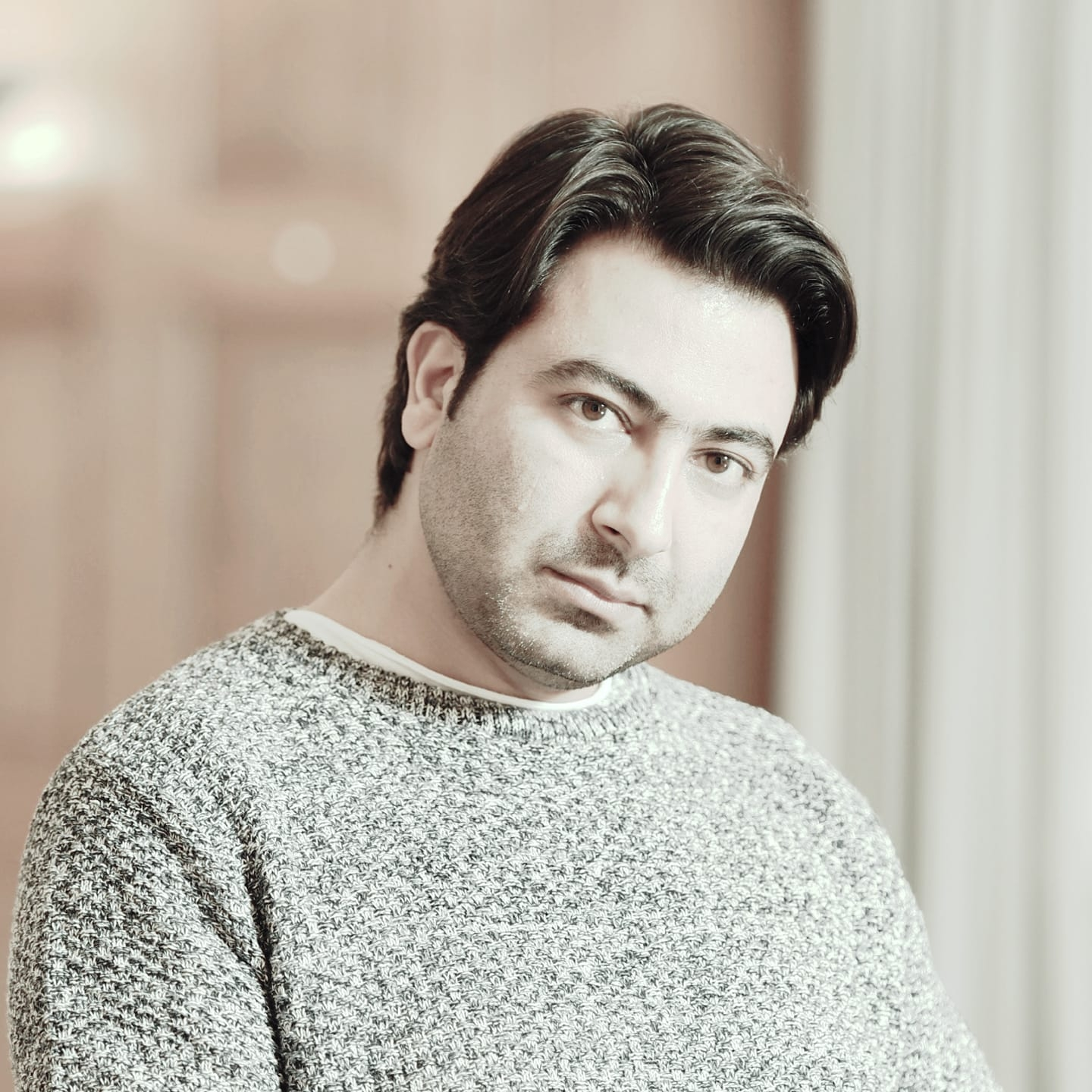
Villa Sträuli, Winterthur, Switzerland 2018

== Education and work ==
Shahnaz Bashir is a doctoral fellow and teaching associate in Communication at the University of Massachusetts Amherst (UMass).. He is an interdisciplinary teacher and researcher of communication, working at the intersection of Communication, AI, visual culture and writing. He teaches communicative writing & critical AI, critical thinking, public speaking and critical theoretical conceptualization of technological communication (via AI and social media). He recently introduced and taught a new course "Pixelated Lies (a course on AI & Visual Disinformation)". This course has been officially inducted into UMass’s “AI and Us: Rethinking Research, Work, and Society” Social Science Series as one of the university’s interdisciplinary AI offerings. Shahnaz is an Instructor of Record at UMass and has been awarded several "Letters of Commendation" for "excellent pedagogy" by the Graduate Programs Director at the Department of Communication. Besides, he has been a four-time finalist for the Distinguished Teaching Award in the Graduate Teaching Associate category at UMass. Earlier, the university also awarded him the Research Enhancement and Leadership (REAL) Fellowship.

Earlier, in June 2011, Shahnaz Bashir founded the Department of Convergent Journalism at the Central University of Kashmir., launching South Asia’s first specialization in Narrative Journalism. Over two decades, he has designed and taught courses on literary journalism, conflict reporting, and AI-generated visual disinformation across institutions in Kashmir, South India, and the U.S. He has served as an opinion editor for two leading English dailies and is a Contributing Editor at The Punch Magazine.

Kashmir Life, in its Jan 2016 year-ender special issue, declared Shahnaz as "one of the eleven impact-makers from the entire population of Jammu & Kashmir".

He is the South Asia juror for the True Story Award, the first-ever global journalism prize instituted in Bern, Switzerland.

== Critical acclaim on literary achievements ==
Shahnaz Bashir's fiction has appeared in major anthologies and his essays and reportage have been published in TIME and other leading platforms. His debut novel The Half Mother (Hachette, 2014) won the Muse India Young Writer Award 2015. The book has been translated into several Indian languages and French as La Mère Orpheline, becoming the first-ever novel from Kashmir to be translated into a foreign (European) language.

Shahnaz Bashir's second book Scattered Souls (HarperCollins, 2016) was longlisted for "Tata Lit Live Award 2017" for Best Book - Fiction. It was conferred with The Citizen's "Talent of the Year Award 2017". In April 2018, Kashmir Observer reported "Scattered Souls is the best-selling fiction book in Kashmir till date... Its sales [in the bookstores of Srinagar] have surpassed the other fiction titles by Kashmiri writers writing in English". His works of fiction have been compared with Saadat Hasan Manto and Anton Chekov. The Asian Age observed: "There are easy comparisons with Manto in the often-shocking glibness with which Bashir lays bare a character's innermost feelings, or with Chekov in the rootedness of the characters to their circumstances."

In 2017, Pro Helvetia, the Swiss Arts Council awarded him a writer's research residency at Winterthur, Switzerland.

== Books ==
- The Half Mother (Hachette, 2014),
- Scattered Souls (HarperCollins, 2016),
- The Disease (forthcoming...)

== Book chapters ==
- Cinema Palladium, Nachbilder: Eine Foto Text Anthologie (Spector Books via Zurich University of the Arts (ZHdK) and Fotomuseum Winterthur 2021),
- The Gravestone, A Clutch of Indian Masterpieces (Aleph Book Company 2016),

== Journal articles ==
- Bashir, S. Multimodal grounded theory method: an extension framework to analyze layered social-media data in the current algorithmic culture. Quality & Quantity: International Journal of Methodology (2026). https://doi.org/10.1007/s11135-026-02948-y
- Shahnaz Bashir; Snow on the Tongue: Autoethnography’s Epistemological Resistance to AI Authorship. Journal of Autoethnography 1 July 2026; 7 (3): 391–411. doi: https://doi.org/10.1525/joae.2026.7.3.391
- Bashir, S. (2026). (A)I Reflect; Therefore, (A)I am (Not): Synthetic, Procedural Reflexivity and the Limits of Agentic-AI-Persona-Generated Epistemology. International Journal of Human–Computer Interaction, Taylor & Francis-Routledge.1–28. https://doi.org/10.1080/10447318.2026.2740325

== Awards ==
- Emerging Scholar Award 2024, by Common Ground Research Network, University of Illinois, Urbana-Champaign, USA
- Pro-Helvetia Swiss Arts Council Writer's Residency Award 2018
- The Citizen's Talent of the Year Award 2016-17
- Scattered Souls Longlisted for Tata Lit Live Award Best Book Fiction 2017
- Winner of Muse India Young Writer Award 2015 for The Half Mother
- Shamim Ahmad Shamim Memorial-Kashmir Times Award 2007
- University Gold Medal and Award of Merit for top rank in graduate media studies, class of 2004-2006
