= Kate Masur =

American historian

Kate Masur is an American historian and author. She is a professor of history at Northwestern University.

Her book Until Justice Be Done was a 2022 Pulitzer Prize finalist and winner of the American Historical Association's Littleton-Griswold Prize in US law and society, broadly defined.

== Books ==
- An Example for All the Land: Emancipation and the Struggle over Equality in Washington, D.C. (UNC Press, 2010)
- (with Gregory Downs) The World the Civil War Made (UNC Press, 2015)
- (author of introduction) They Knew Lincoln, by John E. Washington (Oxford University Press, 2018)
- Until Justice Be Done: America’s First Civil Rights Movement, from the Revolution to Reconstruction (W. W. Norton, 2021)

== Articles ==
- "The African American Delegation to Abraham Lincoln: A Reappraisal Civil War History, Vol. 56, No. 2, June 2010, pp. 117-144.
