= Illusion (Shahin Najafi album) =

توهم Illusion

Studio album by Shahin Najafi
- Released: 19 September 2009
- Genre: Persian rap
- Length: 37:12
- Label: Pamas-Verlag
- Producer: Mehdi Sohani

Shahin Najafi chronology
Ma mard nistim (2008)	توهم; Illusion (2009)

Professional ratings
Review scores
Source	Rating
DW	4/5 stars
Eshterak	4/5 stars
VOA	4.5/5 stars
Nasim-E Haraz	4/5 stars
Rapsong	3.5/5 stars
Rap-be-Rap	4/5 stars

Illusion (Persian: توهم) is the second studio album by the Iranian rapper and singer-songwriter, Shahin Najafi as a solo artist after leaving Tapesh 2012. It was officially released on 19 September 2009 by the German-Iranian Pamas-Verlag publishing house.

Three days prior to the official release of the album, Najafi placed "Vaghti Khoda Khabeh" on his personal blog for free download. He also released a digital version of the entire album on 10 October for Iranian residing inside Iran to download at no cost.

== Track listing ==
1. "When God is Rage"
2. "The Voice of the Woman"
3. "The Last Time"
4. "My Hasan"
5. "Hamoon..."
6. "Everything is a Lie"
7. "On Our Side"
8. "Sarina"
9. "Now That Human"
10. "I am a Suffering"
