= Nahid Hagigat =

Iranian-American illustrator and artist

- ناهید حقیقت
- Born: 1943 (age 82–83); Iran
- Education: New York University (NYU)
- Known for: Printmaking and Painting
- Spouse: Nicky Nodjoumi (divorced)
- Website: Nahid Hagigat's official website

Nahid Hagigat or Nahid Haghighat (Persian: ناهید حقیقت; b. 1943) is an Iranian-American illustrator, printmaker and artist, located in New York City. She is well known for her paintings and prints with layered imagery.

== Biography ==
Hagigat was born in 1943 in Iran. She studied at Tehran University.

She moved to New York to continue her art education at New York University in 1968. In the early 1970s she studied Fine Arts at New York University (NYU) and met her husband, artist Nicky Nodjoumi while in school. In the 70s she was also "one of the few female artists to address political issues at the time." She has a Ph.D. in Art Education from NYU and a Ph.D. from Huntington Pacific University in Behavioral Therapy. Her work is part of the permanent collection at the Metropolitan Museum of Art.

== Illustrations ==
- Muna, CD/Album cover, music by Markéta Irglová, 2014
- Anar, CD/Album cover, music by Markéta Irglová, 2011
- Half for You, written by M. Azad, 2010
- The Valiant Little Potter, retold by Erick Berry, 1973
- The Story of the Little Robin, written by M. Azad, 1968

== Exhibitions ==
- 2013 – 2014: Iran Modern, Asian Society, New York
- 2013: Public Affairs Alliance of Iranian Americans (PAAIA) Gala, San Francisco, California
- 2011: Encyclopædia Iranica Exhibition of Iranian Art, Leila Heller Gallery, New York, New York
- 2010: One Generation – Seven Artists, Zora Space Gallery, Brooklyn, New York
- 1987: An Iranian Couple, Sherkat Gallery, New York, New York
