= Central University of Kashmir =

Central University located in Kashmir, India

- Other name: CU Kashmir
- Motto: Knowledge is Power
- Type: Central university
- Established: 2009; 17 years ago
- Accreditation: NAAC
- Academic affiliations: UGC; AIU; ACU
- Chancellor: Lt. Gen. Syed Ata Hasnain (Retd.)
- Vice-Chancellor: A. Ravinder Nath
- Visitor: President of India
- Academic staff: 190 (2022)
- Students: 3,051 (2022)
- Undergraduates: 686 (2022)
- Postgraduates: 2,063 (2022)
- Doctoral students: 302 (2022)
- Location: Ganderbal, Jammu and Kashmir, India; 34°14′01″N 74°43′35″E
- Campus: Rural 500 acres (200 ha)
- Website: www.cukashmir.ac.in

Central University of Kashmir (often abbreviated as CUKmr), formerly Central University of Jammu and Kashmir, is a central university in the Ganderbal district of Jammu and Kashmir, India. It was established in March 2009 through an Act of Parliament, "The Central Universities Act, 2009," by the Government of India. The university started functioning in May 2009. The Indian Institute of Ranking Framework (IIRF) placed it in the 33rd rank among the Central Universities category in 2024.

== Academics ==
The Central University of Kashmir offers a three-year bachelor's degree programme in vocational studies (BVoc), a five-year integrated bachelor's degree programme in arts and laws (BA-LLB), five-year integrated bachelor's and master's degree programmes (BSc-MSc) in biotechnology, mathematics, physics, and zoology, a three-year integrated bachelor's and master's degree programme in Education (BEd-MEd), and postgraduate programmes, including LLM, MA, MBA, MCom, MSc, MTech, and MTTM. These programmes are offered through different academic departments. At present, the available disciplines are Biotechnology, Business Administration, Commerce, Comparative Religion, Computer Science, Convergent Journalism, Economics, Education, English, Information Technology, Islamic Studies, Law, Mathematics, Physical Education, Physics, Political Science, Teacher Education, Travel and Tourism Management, Urdu, Vocational Studies (in two branches: 1. Retail and Logistic Management & 2. Tourism and Hospitality Management), and Zoology. In addition, research programmes like integrated MPhil-PhD programme in Biotechnology, Economics, Education, English, Journalism, Management Studies, Mathematics, Political Science, Religious Studies, Tourism Studies, and Urdu and direct PhD programme in Law along with few PG diploma programmes (in Guidance and Counselling, Peace and Conflict Studies, and Alternate Banking) are also offered by the university.

== Campus ==
The Central University of Kashmir started its operation from rented accommodations in Hyderpora, Nowgam, and Sonwar areas of Srinagar district. It started shifting to its originally allotted district, Ganderbal in 2018 and was completely shifted to Ganderbal in 2019.

The university currently operates from four campuses in district Ganderbal: Green Campus at Duderhama, Science Campus at Nunar, Science and Arts Campus at Old Hospital Building, Ganderbal, and Main Campus at Tulmulla.

The main campus at Tulmulla is distributed over a large area of more than 500 acres of land. However, many of its buildings are under construction.

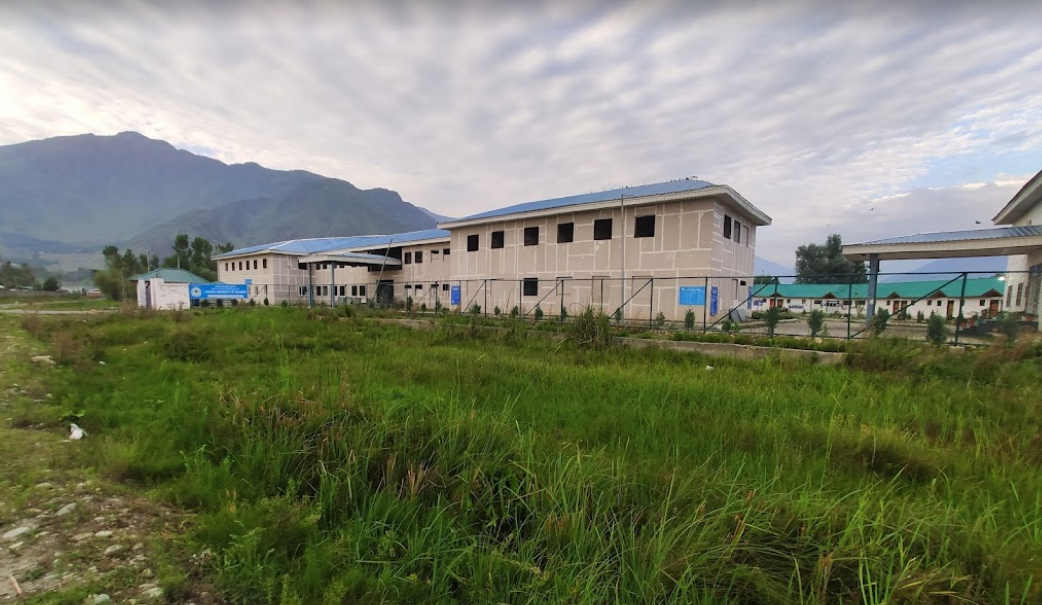
Under construction buildings at the Main Campus, Tulmula, Ganderbal. (August 2021)

== Organisation and administration ==
=== Governance ===
The President of India is the Visitor of the University. The Chancellor is the ceremonial head of the university while the executive powers rest with the Vice-chancellor. The Court, the Executive Council, the Academic Council, the Board of studies and the Finance Committee are the administrative authorities of the university.

The University Court is the supreme authority of the university and has the power to review, the broad policies and programmes of the university and to suggest measures for the improvement and development of the university; The Executive Council is the highest executive body of the university. The Academic Council is the highest academic body of the university and is responsible for the co-ordination and exercising general supervision over the academic policies of the university. It has the right to advise the Executive Council on all academic matters. The Finance Committee is responsible for recommending financial policies, goals, and budgets.

=== Chancellors of the University ===
1. Dr. Srikumar Banerjee (2012-2017)
2. Lt. General Syed Ata Hasnain (Incumbent)

=== Vice-Chancellors of the University ===
1. Prof. Abdul Wahid Qureshi (2009-2014)
2. Prof. Mehraj-ud-Din Mir (2014-2021)
3. Prof. Farooq Ahmad Shah (2021-2023)
4. Prof. A Ravinder Nath (Incumbent)

== Schools and Centres ==
The university comprises the following schools and centres:

- School of Business Studies
1. Department of Commerce
2. Department of Management Studies
3. Department of Tourism Studies
- School of Education
1. Department of Education
2. Department of Physical Education
- School of Engineering & Technology
1. Department of Information Technology
- School of Languages
1. Department of English
2. Department of Kashmiri
3. Department of Urdu
- School of Legal Studies
1. Department of Law
2. Dr. B. R. Ambedkar Multidisciplinary Research Centre for Law, Public Policy and Social Action
- School of Life Sciences
1. Department of Animal Sciences (Zoology)
2. Department of Botany
3. Department of Biotechnology
- School of Media Studies
1. Department of Communication & Journalism
- School of Physical & Chemical Sciences
1. Department of Chemistry
2. Department of Mathematics
3. Department of Physics
- School of Social Sciences
1. Department of Economics
2. Department of Politics and Governance
3. Department of Religious Studies
4. Mahatma Gandhi Centre For Interdisciplinary Research

== Notable alumni ==
- Sanna Irshad Mattoo - Pulitzer prize winner
- Masrat Zahra - Anja Niedringhaus Courage in Photojournalism award winner
- MC Kash - Rapper

== Other people ==
- Shahnaz Bashir - Novelist

== See also ==
1. University of Kashmir
2. University of Jammu
3. Central University of Jammu
4. Cluster University of Srinagar
5. Cluster University of Jammu
6. SKUAST, Jammu
