= Kevin Sheppard =

Personal information
- Born: September 17, 1979 (age 47) St Croix, United States Virgin Islands
- Listed height: 6 ft 0 in (1.83 m)

Career information
- College: Jacksonville (1998–2003)
- NBA draft: 2003: undrafted
- Playing career: 2003–present
- Position: Point guard

Career history
- 2003: Cocoteros de Paria
- 2004: Toros de Aragua
- 2004: Gallitos de Isabela
- 2004: Guacharos de Maturin
- 2004–2005: Maccabi Rishon LeZion
- 2005–2006: La Union Colon
- 2006: Guaynabo Conquistadores
- 2006–2007: Minot SkyRockets
- 2007: Marinos de Anzoategui
- 2007: Maratonistas de Coamo
- 2007–2008: Azad University
- 2008: Guaynabo Conquistadores
- 2008–2009: a.s Shiraz
- 2009: Quebradillas Pirates
- 2009–2015: Azad University
Medals
Men's basketball
Representing Virgin Islands
Centrobasket
Silver medal – second place	2006 Panama
Silver medal – second place	2008 Mexico
FIBA CBC Championship
Silver medal – second place	2006 Jamaica
Gold medal – first place	2011 Bahamas

Kevin Sheppard
Personal information
- Full name: Kevin Alphonso Sheppard
- Date of birth: September 17, 1979 (age 47)
- Place of birth: St Croix, United States Virgin Islands
- Height: 6 ft 0 in (1.83 m)
- Position: Striker

Senior career*
Years	Team	Apps	(Gls)
- Jacksonville University

International career^{‡}
2002	United States Virgin Islands	2	(2)
- * Club domestic league appearances and goals ‡ National team caps and goals as of 20 December 2008

Kevin Sheppard (born 17 September 1979 in St Croix) is a United States Virgin Islands basketball player and former football striker. He became the subject of the documentary The Iran Job which covers his 2008-2009 season with the A.S. Shiraz team in Iran.

== Soccer career ==
Sheppard played soccer as well as basketball at Jacksonville University. He made his debut for the United States Virgin Islands in an August 2002 CONCACAF Gold Cup qualification match against the Dominican Republic and also played in the return game.

Appearances and goals by national team and year
National team	Year	Apps	Goals
United States Virgin Islands	2002	2	2
Total		2	2

Scores and results list United States Virgin Islands' goal tally first, score column indicates score after each Sheppard goal.

List of international goals scored by Kevin Sheppard
No.	Date	Venue	Opponent	Score	Result	Competition	Ref.
1	16 August 2002	San Cristóbal, Dominican Republic	Dominican Republic	1–4	1–6	2003 CONCACAF Gold Cup qualification	
2	18 August 2002	San Cristóbal, Dominican Republic	Dominican Republic	1–4	1–5	2003 CONCACAF Gold Cup qualification	

== Basketball ==
Sheppard chose to pursue a professional career in basketball and played in Venezuela, Israel, Poland, Spain, Argentina, the United States, and Puerto Rico before joining Iranian team Azad University in Tehran. Sheppard is the subject of a documentary, The Iran Job, which covers his 2008-2009 season with the A.S. Shiraz team in Iran.

== See also ==
- List of top international men's football goalscorers by country
- The Iran Job
