= Winfred Rembert =

African American artist (1945–2021)

Winfred Rembert (November 22, 1945 – March 31, 2021) was an African-American artist who used hand-tools and shoe dye on leather canvases.

== Personal life ==
Winfred Rembert was born on November 22, 1945, in Cuthbert, Randolph County, Georgia. Raised by his great-aunt, he worked in the cotton fields, making as little as 20 cents per day. His laboring caused him to miss school two days a week and he could not read or write until high school. With rising racial tensions in his neighborhood, he cut school at the age of 16.

In 1974, Rembert married Patsy Rembert, a young woman he had met while he was serving time on a chain gang. They married upon his release. Their first child was Winfred Rembert, Jr. followed by seven more children. Rembert died on March 31, 2021, at the age of 75, at his home in New Haven, Connecticut. In his New York Times obituary, Katharine Q. Seelye described Rembert as turning "painful memories into art."

== Career ==
G.S.P. Reidsville (2013) at the National Gallery of Art in 2023

During a civil rights march in the 1960s, Rembert was arrested without being charged. He spent seven years on a chain gang and survived a lynching. As a prisoner, he learned to make tooled-leather wallets and to design on leather. Rembert stretched, tooled, and dyed leather, using shoe dye to depict scenes from the rural Jim Crow south where he was born and raised. As the colors in shoe dye that were available to him became more vivid, so did his paintings.

In April 2010, Rembert had his first one-man show, Memories of My Youth, at the Adelson Galleries in New York City. For much of his adult life, Rembert was a resident of New Haven, Connecticut, where he lived with his wife, Patsy, and eight children. He was a well-known figure in his neighborhood, Newhallville, where he was always referred to as "Pops."

An award-winning feature-length documentary film about his life, All Me: The Life and Times of Winfred Rembert, was released in 2011. The film won audience awards and other citations at the Chicago International Film Festival, Heartland Film Festival, Arlington International Film Festival, Hamptons Take 2 Documentary Film Festival (now called the Hamptons Doc Fest), and others. The documentary was screened on television during the first season of the PBS documentary series America ReFramed. The film has also been shown at the Library of Congress and has been screened across the United States and Canada, often accompanied by exhibits of Rembert's paintings. When his health allowed, Rembert would accompany the film, taking the opportunity to speak to high-school students as well as to film audiences. Members of his family often traveled with him.

Rembert has been the subject of another documentary and several news stories in which he is reported to be one of only a few people known to have survived a lynching during the Jim Crow era. One of the documentaries, Ashes to Ashes, honors victims of lynchings in the South and noted that Rembert was the "only known survivor of a lynching". Ashes to Ashes premiered at the Mountainfilm Festival on May 24, 2019.

Rembert himself was a winner of several significant awards. He was honored by the Equal Justice Initiative in 2015, and was awarded a United States Artists Barr Fellowship in 2016. In his final years, Rembert engaged in an extensive series of conversations and interviews with the philosopher Erin I. Kelly, in order to properly record and bear witness to his life. The resulting memoir, Chasing Me to My Grave: An Artist's Memoir of the Jim Crow South, was published posthumously in September 2021 and won the 2022 Pulitzer Prize for Biography. A member of the Pulitzer Prize Committee wrote that "[Rembert's] life's story, and the creative, compelling way it unfolded, will live with me forever, and the Pulitzer for this work will serve as a reminder of the magnificence and artistic genius that can emanate from racism and incarceration."

== Exhibitions ==
In 2024, Rembert's work was showcased at an exhibition at Hauser + Wirth, Los Angeles.
