= Shahin Najafi =

Iranian musician (born 1980)

Shahin Najafi شاهین نجفی
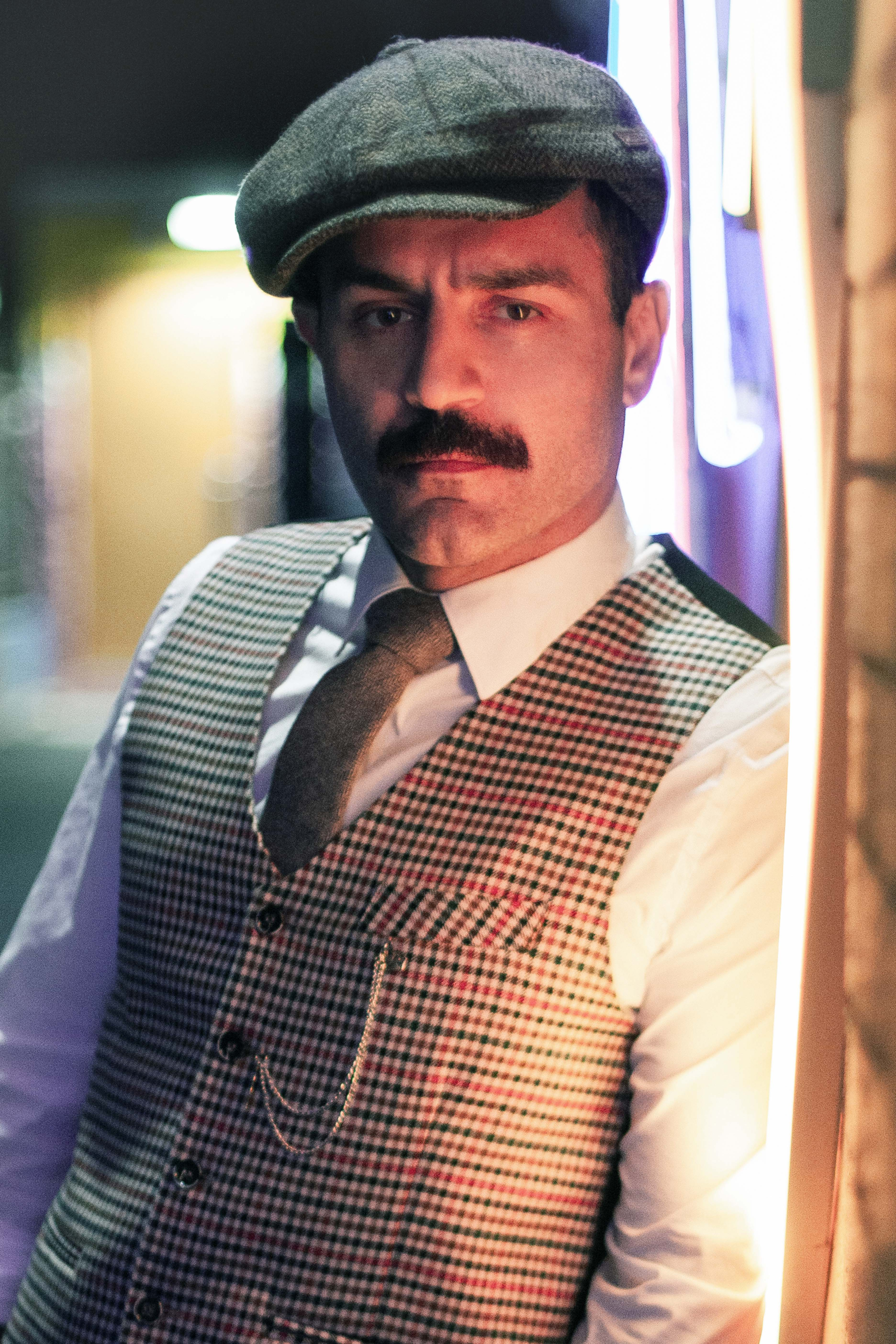
- Shahin Najafi in 2023

Background information
- Born: Morteza Najafipour Moghadam; 1980 (age 45–46); Bandar-e Anzali, Iran
- Genres: Rock; alternative metal; blues; electronic; rap; Folk; folklore; pop
- Occupations: Musician; singer; composer; author; political activist; poet
- Instruments: Vocals; guitar; electric guitar; Bass; setar; Bouzouki; trumpet
- Years active: 2005–present
- Labels: Tapesh 2012 (2006–2008); Pamas-Verlag (2008–2009); Sharr Music (2010); Dyaloge (2018–present)
- Website: www.shahinnajafimusic.com

Morteza Najafipour Moghadam (Persian: مرتضی نجفی‌پور مقدم; born 1980), better known as Shahin Najafi (Persian: شاهین نجفی), is an Iranian musician, singer, composer, poet, author, and political activist.

Najafi's songs mostly deal with issues such as theocracy, poverty, sexism, censorship, child labor, execution, drug addiction and homophobia. In interviews, he has stated that he strives to use poetic, literary, philosophical, and political elements in his music.

== Early life ==
Shahin Najafi was born in 1980 in Bandar-e Anzali, Iran. When he was six years old, his father died, and later his brother became a drug addict and also died. He began writing poetry as a teenager and began learning the guitar in the classical and flamenco styles at the age of 18. He then became an underground artist in Iran, performing in both rock and Spanish music styles, working with various bands.

He studied sociology at the University of Gilan and openly expressed his opinions about the university, leading to his getting expelled.

== Music career ==
=== Immigration to Germany ===
Before he immigrated to Germany, Najafi was the head of an underground music band in Iran. Still, he was banned for his offenses towards the Islamic faith in Iran by the Islamic republic government after his second music show. He was also the head of the Inan music band in Germany. Then he joined the Tapesh 2012 music band. Tapesh 2012 were welcomed by Persian broadcasters and the international media by political and social songs and poems of Najafi.

An article published in No. 19194 of the conservative newspaper Kayhan on 29 September 2008 criticized Tapesh 2012's activities. Kayhan published the article titled Establishing democracy with drum & circle. A part of it goes as follows:

Recently, opponents of the Islamic Republic of Iran continue their goals in universities and in the form of music groups to make known the autocracies of the Islamic Republic government. Recently some blogs of opposition students have published a statement about "Tapesh 2012," which gives news Establishing One Million Signatures by "Tapesh 2012". This group is composed of some Iranian and Germans that are not affiliated with any party or group. The purpose of this group is to attempt to collect signatures and present it on the anniversary of Human Rights (10 December) to Parliament of Europe in Brussels. They have attracted world media attention to unacceptable conditions in Iran and the dissatisfaction of the Iranian people. The Parliament of Europe announced the official support for the group plans. They encourage people to consider how the regime suppresses human rights.

=== Release of first studio album ===
On 1 May 2008, Najafi released his first studio album, Ma mard nistim (We Are Not Men), with the partnership and composition of the Tapesh 2012 music band. This album was his official and professional beginning in Persian hip hop music. The album attracted the audience and listener more than before it was released in Persian hip hop style.

=== Separation from Tapesh 2012 ===
Najafi ended cooperation with Tapesh 2012 at the beginning of 2009. Various reasons have been proposed related to his separation from this group. The main reason is releasing the "Around us" single song on Voice of America TV without permission. The supervisor of Tapesh 2012 later apologized to Najafi and stated: the song had been inadvertently released in Voice of America TV. Najafi accepted the apology.

=== Reaction to the 2009 Iranian presidential election ===
After the Iranian election protests, Najafi released a single named Neda in July 2009 dedicated to Neda Agha-Soltan, an activist killed during the protests. He released his second studio album titled Tavahhom (Illusion) on 19 September 2009 by the German-Iranian publishing house "Pamas-Verlag". In this album, several songs are about the intense protests against the Islamic republic government and the political oppression after the presidential election. It can be cited as "Vaghti khoda khabe (When God is asleep)" through these songs. The song's lyrics protest the 2009 Iran poll protests trial, militia violence, the use of torture on prisoners, and the Supreme Leader of Islamic republic regime.

=== Formation of Antikarisma ===
He formed a new rock band Antikarisma band in January 2010. The new band, Antikarisma, consists of Najafi, Babak Khazaei, Armin Mostaed, and Pejman Afshari, who live in Germany.

=== Fatwas and death threats ===
Following the release of the song "Ay Naghi!" ("Hey, Naghi!"), Grand Ayatollah Lotfollah Safi Golpaygani, a then 93-year-old Shi’ite cleric based in Qom, issued a fatwa death sentence against Najafi for apostasy. Grand Ayatollah Naser Makarem-Shirazi, a "source of emulation" for many Shia Muslims, also issued a fatwa declaring Najafi guilty of apostasy. As of 15 May 2012, more than 800 people in Islamic republic regime had joined a Facebook campaign calling for Najafi to be executed, saying they were ready to assassinate him if necessary. An Islamic republic regime web site, Shia-Online.ir, offered a US$100,000 bounty to anyone who killed Najafi.

In May 2012, the online site HonareNab.ir posted an online "Shoot the Apostates" flash computer game inviting people to shoot and kill Najafi. "Those who love Imam Hadi can practice killing Shahin Najafi by playing this flash game," said Honar Nab Eslam, who developed the game.

On 25 May 2012, Shiite cleric Ahmad Alamolhoda demanded a plan to execute Najafi.

In June 2012, forty authors of the Rah-e Nikan religious publishing house promised to give royalties from their books to whoever killed Najafi.

The song has drawn sharp anger from protesters who believe it is offensive towards Imam Naghi, the 10th Imam in Shi’ite Islam. In an interview, Najafi stated that he was inspired by "The Campaign to Remind Shiites about Imam Naghi" to compose the song. The campaign is a Facebook page that pokes fun at Islamic, and specifically Shi'ite, hadiths, with members creating fake, funny hadiths and stories centered around a fictional character named Naghi, who is based on Imam Naghi.

=== 2012 US tour ===
Najafi started a United States tour in 2012, starting with a talk on 30 September and later a concert on 16 November at University of California, Berkeley, events sponsored by the Iranian Student Alliance in the United States of America. He continued the tour in UC San Diego on 18 November.

== Political and social activities ==
In addition to individual work in his concerts and campaign songs, Najafi had many performances on various political and social occasions. In October 2008, he had a music show at the "Peace Conference" in Germany. In August 2009, with some poets and writers in shows of "Night of Solidarity with the liberation struggle", Najafi had a protest rock show in Stockholm, Sweden. In December 2009, coinciding with "Student Day" in Iran, Najafi with Ziba Shirazi had a protest music show at Georgetown University, Washington, D.C.

== Discography ==
=== Albums ===
Year	Album
2012	Hich Hich Hich
2013	Tramadol
2015	Sade
2017	Radikal
2019	Jens Sevom
2022	Sigma

=== EPs ===
Year	EP
2014	1414
2020	Chel

=== Live ===
Year	Release
2017	Meta Phrygian

=== Instrumental ===
Year	Release
2019	The Sacred and The Violence

=== Single tracks ===
Year	Track	Details
2012	Istadeh Mordan	
2012	Too Halgham	
2013	Sha'aban	
2014	Amoo Norooz	
2014	Bbbbc	
2014	Salam	
2015	Proletariat	
2016	Ay Leili	
2016	Shahinam	
2017	Abi	
2018	Beh Name To	
2018	Barkhiz	
2018	Ba Mohayam	
2019	Masikh	
2019	Bawaasir	
2019	Aman	ft. Hamed Nikpay
2019	Tabar	
2019	Shivan	
2020	Seyl	
2020	Akharin Booseh	ft. Babak Amini
2020	Tamam	
2021	Parvaz	ft. Babak Amini
2021	Dictatorie Amameh	
2021	Iran	ft. Golrokh Aminian
2021	Pedar	
2021	Maryam	
2022	Hashtadia	
2022	Sobhe Entegham	
2023	Shah	
2023	Enhedam	
2023	Kafan	
2024	ADHD	The Shah & Hand
2025	Hameh	

== Movie ==
Till Schauder released a documentary called When God Sleeps based on the life of Najafi, with the production of Sara Nodjoumi. The Hollywood Reporter puts it in a report on the film between the 23 films at the Tribeca Film Festival.

The film is made in 88 minutes in German, Persian, and English, and is amid a 2015 terrorist attack. The film is about the details of Shahin's life and, in general, the fatwa of apostasy and life under the shadow of this fatwa.

== Books ==
- When the God is Asleep
- Azazel
- Bitrex
- Tara Ensan

== See also ==
- List of Iranian hip-hop artists
