= Chasing Me to My Grave =

2021 memoir by Winfred Rembert and Erin I. Kelly

Chasing Me to My Grave: An Artist's Memoir of the Jim Crow South
- First edition
- Author: Winfred Rembert, Erin I. Kelly
- Subject: Memoir
- Publisher: Bloomsbury
- Publication date: September 2021
- Pages: 304
- ISBN: 9781635576597

Chasing Me to My Grave: An Artist's Memoir of the Jim Crow South is a 2021 memoir by artist Winfred Rembert written in collaboration with philosophy professor Erin I. Kelly. The book was published posthumously after Rembert's death in March 2021. It won the 2022 Pulitzer Prize for Biography or Autobiography.

== Summary ==
The memoir follows Rembert's experience with racism against African-Americans in the United States during his youth in the 1950s and 1960s. Following his imprisonment and an attempted lynching in the 1960s, Rembert uses painting and leather carving to create art and express himself. For the book, Rembert recounted his life to Erin Kelly, an academic who teaches at Tufts University, and it features art created by Rembert.

== Reception ==
Albert Mobilio described the memoir as a "cause for hope and shame. It’s a story about running and a story about having nowhere to go." Stephanie Striker was impressed by the harrowing details of Rembert's life, particularly the lynching attempt against him, and appreciated the book's themes of hope and love in the face of such adversity. Ron Slate applauded Kelly for bringing Rembert's life story to life while preserving his own voice, but found that it was hard times to keep track of what was happening as the book traveled quickly from place to place through different times of Rembert's life.

Rembert and Kelly won the 2022 Pulitzer Prize for Biography or Autobiography.
