= Capitol Theater Building =

Building in Arlington, Massachusetts, US

- U.S. National Register of Historic Places
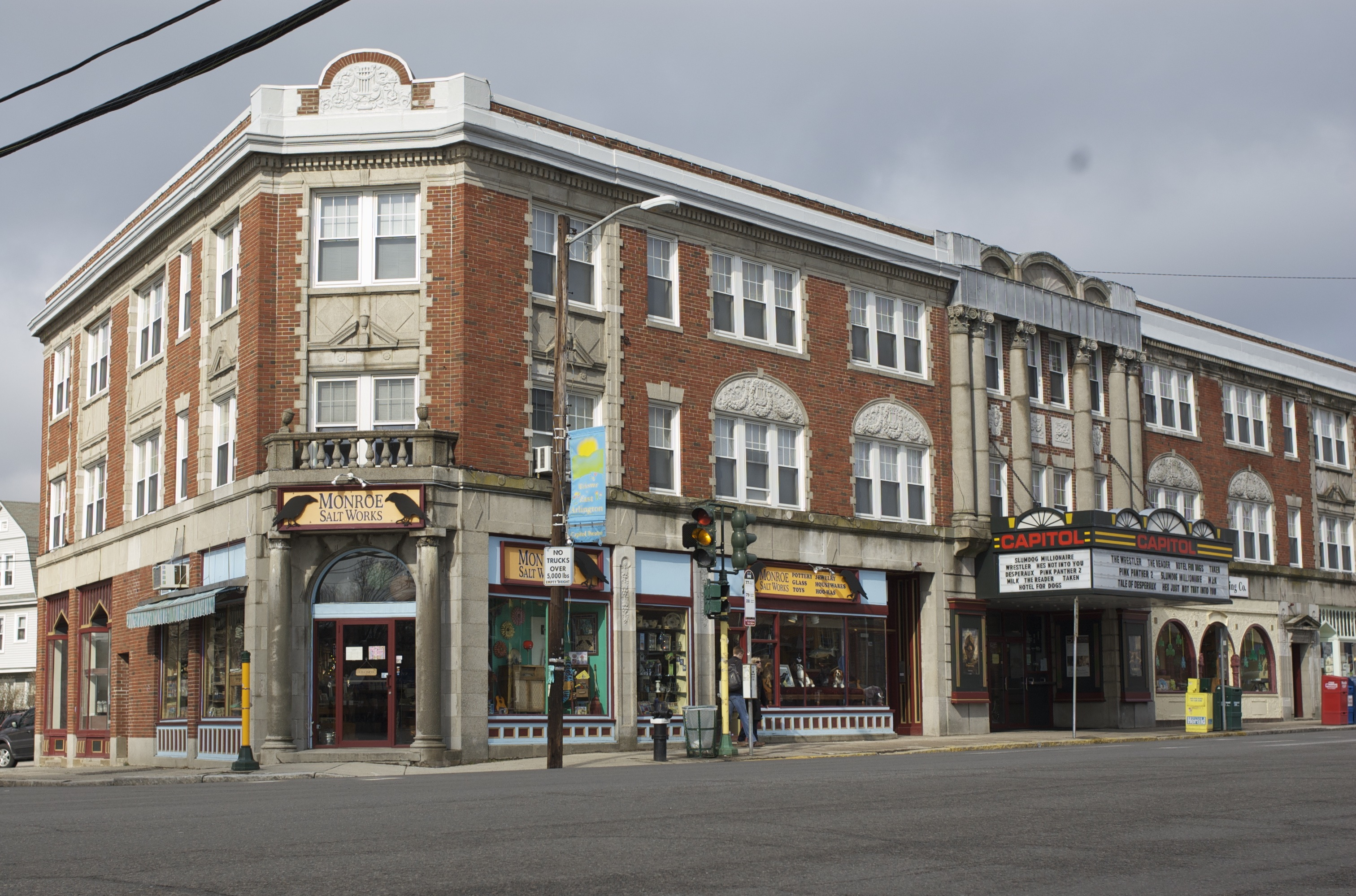

- Location within Massachusetts Location within the United States
- Location: Arlington, Massachusetts
- Coordinates: 42°24′20″N 71°8′35″W
- Built: 1925
- Architect: Drummey, William J.
- Architectural style: Classical Revival
- MPS: Arlington MRA
- NRHP reference No.: 85001025
- Added to NRHP: April 18, 1985

The Capitol Theater Building is a historic mixed commercial, residential, and theatrical building at 202–208 Massachusetts Avenue in Arlington, Massachusetts. It was built in 1925 by the Locatelli family, and is one of the area's finest early motion picture theaters. The building was added to the National Register of Historic Places in 1985.

== Description ==
The Capitol Theater building is a large three-story brick and masonry structure at the northwest corner of Massachusetts Avenue and Lake Street in eastern Arlington. The building is stylistically diverse, featuring elements found in the Classical Revival, Baroque, and early Art Deco styles. The entrance to the theater is found on the long facade facing Massachusetts Avenue, flanked by several commercial storefronts. There is a storefront with an angled entrance at the corner with Lake Street, and another on Lake Street that now provides access to part of the theater lobby.

In the late 2000s, the businesses along the stretch of Massachusetts Avenue surrounding the building organized as the Capitol Square Business Association.

== Theater history ==
The theater was designed by William J. Drummey, and built in 1925 as part of the Albert Locatelli chain of theaters. The Locatellis also built other area theaters like the Ball Square Theater and Central Theater, both in Somerville. The building cost $500,000 to build, and originally housed 11 stores, office space on the second floor, and 15 apartments on the third.

The theater originally had a large pipe organ and seating for 1600 people among an orchestra area and balcony for viewing a stage where, in addition to films, vaudeville acts could be seen. The theater changed owners several times between the early 1930s and 1990 and was multiplexed in 1989. During the 1960s the theater was remodeled to a more contemporary design but the original details including granite columns and gold leaf detail were simply covered over rather than demolished. As a result, during renovations in the 1990s the theater was able to be returned to its former 1930s styling. In the process of multiplex conversion great care was taken to preserve the original aesthetic of the theater and each screening room retains the distinct character of the original space. Theater #1 encompasses the original orchestra seating area, stage and soaring ceilings with gold leaf and plaster details. Other screening rooms now occupy the former balcony and backstage area.

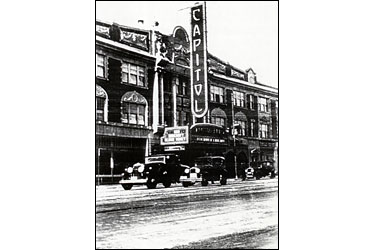
Image of the Arlington, MA Capitol Theater circa 1930 with original blade sign

== See also ==
- National Register of Historic Places listings in Arlington, Massachusetts
