= Jammu and Kashmir Democratic Freedom Party =

- President: Mehmood Ahmed Saghar
- Spokesperson: Mehmood Ahmed Saghar
- Founder: Shabir Shah
- Founded: May 1998
- Ideology: Separatism

Website
- https://jkdfp.com/

Jammu and Kashmir Democratic Freedom Party is a separatist political party launched by Shabir Shah in May 1998. JKDFP called for tripartite negotiations between India, Pakistan and Kashmir.

== Shabir Shah ==
Shabir Ahmad Shah (born 14 June 1953), popularly known as Shabir Shah, is an activist and prisoner from Indian Administered Kashmir . He is the founder and president of the Jammu and Kashmir Democratic Freedom Party (JKDFP). He supports the idea of Jammu and Kashmir being separated. He spent 32 years of his life in jail. In 1992, Amnesty International called him "The Prisoner of Conscience."

In December 2021, it was reported that Shah was "gravely ill" in prison.

== Mehmood Ahmed Saghar ==
Mehmood Ahmed Saghar (born March 11, 1958, in Srinagar) is a Kashmiri political figure known for his active involvement in the Freedom Struggle for self-determination in the region. He has faced numerous challenges and spent a significant portion (12 years) of his life in various jails across India.

=== Early life and education ===
Mehmood Ahmed Saghar received his early education in his hometown before dedicating himself to the Freedom Struggle at an early age.

=== Freedom Struggle ===
Saghar played a pivotal role in the ongoing struggle for self-determination. He served as the first-ever Convenor of the All Parties Hurriyat Conference (APHC) Pakistan Chapter when the alliance was established in 1993. Additionally, he was re-elected as the Convenor of APHC Pakistan Chapter in 2010. Currently, Saghar holds the position of Acting Chairman of the Jammu Kashmir Democratic Freedom Party (JKDFP) and continues to be the Convenor of APHC Pakistan Chapter, representing the people of Kashmir.

== See also ==
- Syed Ali Shah Geelani
- Hurriyat and Problems before Plebiscite
- Kashmir conflict
- 2014 Jammu and Kashmir Legislative Assembly election
