= Shabir Shah =

Kashmiri separatist leader

Shabir Ahmad Shah
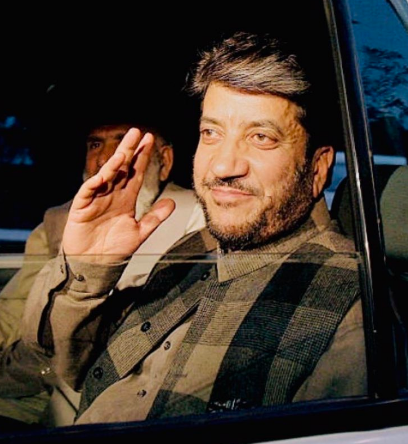
- Shabir Shah
- Born: 14 June 1953 (age 73); Anantnag, Jammu and Kashmir, India
- Occupation: Separatist leader
- Known for: Founder of the Jammu and Kashmir Democratic Freedom Party
- Spouse: Bilquies Shah

Shabir Ahmad Shah (born 14 June 1953), popularly known as Shabir Shah, is a Kashmiri separatist political leader and the founder and president of the Jammu and Kashmir Democratic Freedom Party (JKDFP), a separatist political organisation that advocates self-determination for Jammu and Kashmir.

Shah has spent several years in prison or under detention in connection with separatist activities. In June 2019 he was arrested by the National Investigation Agency (NIA) in a terror-funding case. In March 2026, the Supreme Court of India granted him bail, citing prolonged delay in the trial proceedings.

== Birth and childhood ==
Born in a business family of South Kashmir's Kadipora town in district Anantnag on 14 June 1953. Shabir Ahmad Shah Varrier did his early schooling at Government Middle School, Sarnal, Anantnag and passed a higher secondary examination from M.I. Higher Secondary School, Anantnag but could not continue his studies due to affiliation with various students’ leagues for which was jailed at very early age.

Shah's father was Ghulam Mohammad Varrier, who was a Block Development Officer. He apparently died in police custody in 1989.

== Personal life ==
Shabir is married to Bilquies Shah, a doctor by profession, and they have two daughters - Sehar Shabir Shah and Sama Shabir shah.

== Political career ==
=== Men’s League to People’s League ===
Shah's political career began in 1968 when, at the age of 14, he led a demonstration against the Indian government in Kashmir, following which he was arrested and kept in police lockup for three months. Soon afterwards, Shah and his colleagues formed the Young Men's League. He, along with other league activists, was arrested several times, which affected Shah's education.

During his confinement in Central Jail Srinagar, Shah met several resistance leaders including Nazir Ahmad Wani (Al-Fateh), Abdul Majid Pathan (Youth League), Altaf Khan alias Azam Inquilabi (Students Islamic Organization), and Ghulam Qadir Hagroo, with whom he discussed plans related to the demand for self-determination. While Shah was still in jail, his associates Nazir Ahmad Wani, S. Hamid, Fazal Haq Qureshi, Abdul Majid Pathan and others formed the Jammu Kashmir People's League on 3 October 1974, with Nazir Ahmad Wani as its chairman and Abdul Majid as its general secretary. The organisation opposed the Indira–Abdullah Accord (1975) and organised rallies across the state.

=== Formation of Jammu and Kashmir Democratic Freedom Party ===
In 1998, Shah formed the Jammu and Kashmir Democratic Freedom Party (JKDFP), which advocates self-determination for the people of Kashmir.

=== Imprisonment ===
Shah was arrested for the first time in 1968, when he was aged 14, for organising and leading a student demonstration demanding what he described as the "right of self-determination" for the people of Kashmir. He was jailed for three months and 15 days in Srinagar's Central Jail. After his release, he resumed political activities and formed the Young Men's League with his colleagues, for which he was again arrested in Anantnag and detained for eight months in Srinagar's Central Jail. After his release, he was arrested again in 1971 on allegations of being a pro-Pakistan activist and was detained in the district police lines at Anantnag for seven months.

In 1972, Shah organised demonstrations in Jammu and was arrested under the Defence of Indian Rules Act (DIR) and detained in Central Jail, Srinagar for eleven months. During this period, the political situation in the subcontinent was changing following the creation of Bangladesh. After his release, Shah addressed a rally in Anantnag demanding freedom for the Kashmiri people and criticised agreements such as the Shimla Agreement. As a result, he was arrested again in May 1973, five months after his release, and detained for another nine months in Srinagar's Central Jail.

In 1975, Shah denounced the Indira-Abdullah Accord signed by the Indian Prime Minister Indira Gandhi and Sheikh Muhammad Abdullah. He was arrested for four months and subsequently confined in Central Jail, Srinagar for another 30 months. After his release in 1978, Shah resumed underground political activities.

In 1980, Shah was re-arrested and initially kept in sub-jail Kathua before being transferred to Central Jail in Srinagar, where he remained for twelve months. He was released towards the end of 1981 but was re-arrested in early 1982 when the People's League launched the Quit Kashmir Movement. Demonstrations followed his arrest and normal life in the valley was disrupted for several days. Shah was later released but was again detained from Kailash Hotel and held in the Kothi Bagh interrogation centre for three and a half months, followed by twelve months in Srinagar's Central Jail. He was released in 1983. During an international cricket match in Srinagar in October 1983, Shah led protests against the government and was arrested again in 1984.

When Shah was released in 1986, his health had deteriorated. Shortly after his release he addressed a press conference demanding that the Kashmiri people be given what he described as the "right of self-determination".

Between April 1988 and August 1989, Shah remained underground. In 1989, he was arrested along with a militant in the Ramban area of the Jammu–Srinagar national highway.

In 2015 Shah was placed under house arrest.

On 21 May 2017 it was reported that Shabir Ahmad Shah had resigned as secretary-general of the pro-freedom group Tehreek-e-Hurriyat led by Syed Ali Shah Geelani.

In 2020, during the COVID-19 outbreak, Shah's wife said that he had spent 33 years in jail and that people should remain indoors to prevent the spread of the virus.

=== 2019 arrest and terror funding case ===
In June 2019, Shah was arrested by the National Investigation Agency (NIA) in connection with a terror-funding investigation related to alleged separatist activities in Jammu and Kashmir.

The case was registered under the Unlawful Activities (Prevention) Act (UAPA) and other provisions of Indian law. Shah remained in judicial custody while the trial proceedings continued for several years.

In December 2021, it was reported that Shah was "gravely ill" in prison.

On 12 March 2026, the Supreme Court of India granted him bail, noting the prolonged delay in the trial and the length of his incarceration since 2019.

== Support for Shabir Ahmad Shah ==
In 1994, Amnesty International condemned the imprisonment of Shah via AI INDEX: ASA 20/WU 13/94 and demanded his release claiming that Shah was illegally imprisoned under the TADA Act.

In 2021, a Chicago-based organisation Justice for All, started the #FreeShabirShah campaign, claiming that Shah has served 35 years in prison without any conviction and suffering from hypertension, diabetes, and heart disease.
