= Danish Siddiqui =

Indian photojournalist (1983–2021)

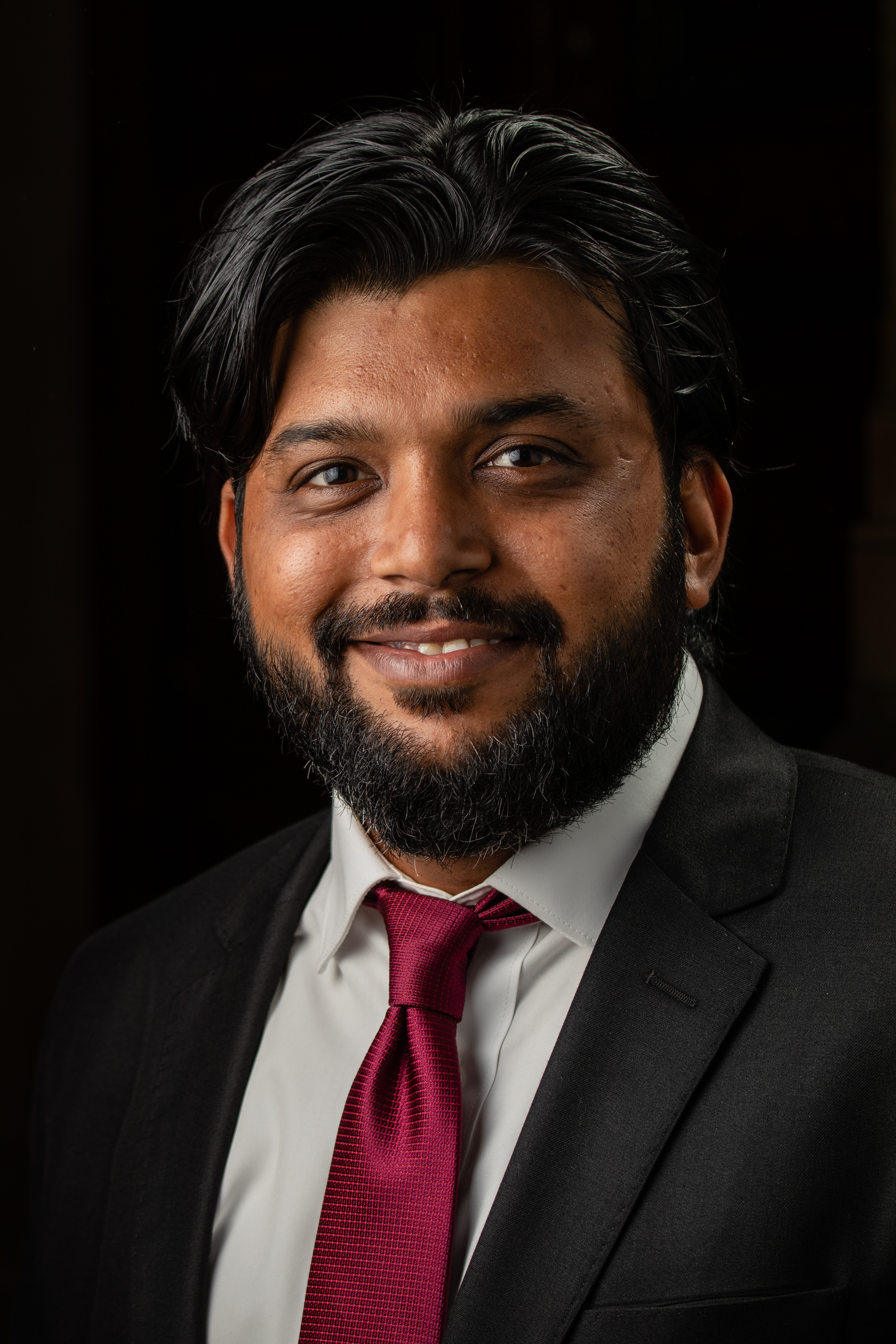
- Siddiqui in 2018
- Born: 9 May 1983; New Delhi, India
- Died: 16 July 2021 (aged 38); Spin Boldak, Kandahar, Afghanistan
- Cause of death: Gunshot wounds
- Resting place: Jamia Millia Islamia cemetery
- Education: Jamia Millia Islamia
- Occupation: Photojournalist
- Employer: Reuters
- Awards: Pulitzer Prize (2018, 2022)

Danish Siddiqui (19 May 1983 – 16 July 2021) was an Indian photojournalist based in Delhi, who used to lead the national Reuters multimedia team and was Chief Photographer India. He received his first 2018 Pulitzer Prize for Feature Photography, as part of the Reuters team, for documenting the Rohingya refugee crisis. In 2021, he was killed while covering a clash between Afghan security forces and Taliban forces near a border crossing with Pakistan. His second Pulitzer was awarded posthumously in 2022 for documenting the COVID-19 pandemic.

== Early life and education ==
Siddiqui grew up in the neighbourhood of the university, and attended the Fr. Agnel School, New Delhi.

He graduated with a degree in economics from JMI before pursuing post-graduation in Mass Communication from the A.J.K. Mass Communication Research Centre at Jamia in 2007.

== Career ==
Siddiqui started his career as a correspondent for the Hindustan Times before shifting to the TV Today Network. He switched to photojournalism and joined Reuters as an intern in 2010. Siddiqui had since covered the Afghanistan War (2012), Battle of Mosul (2016–2017), the April 2015 Nepal earthquake, the 2015 Rohingya refugee crisis, the 2019–2020 Hong Kong protests, the 2020 Delhi riots, and the COVID-19 pandemic among other stories in South Asia, Middle East and Europe.

Since July 2021, he was serving as an embedded journalist with the Afghan Special Forces to document the Taliban offensive, in what would be his last assignment.

=== Significant photographs ===
A photograph taken during the 2020 Delhi riots, documenting the lynching of a Muslim man by a Hindu mob, was featured by Reuters as one of the defining photographs of the year. BBC News, National Public Radio, and The Caravan noted it to be the defining image of the riot. Another photograph, taken of a teenage right-wing activist brandishing a pistol at protesters while police looked on, became evidence of "the emboldening of Hindu nationalists" in the wake of the Citizenship (Amendment) Act, 2019.

His photos depicting mass cremations of COVID-19 fatalities in India generated outrage. Right-wing news portals attacked Siddiqui for capitalizing on "Hindu suffering" and private grief.

== Major awards ==
In 2018, he became the first Indian alongside Adnan Abidi to win the Pulitzer Prize for Feature Photography (as part of the Photography staff of Reuters) for documenting the 2015 Rohingya refugee crisis. In 2013, Siddiqui had secured the third position in the Arts and Culture Category at the Sony World Photography Awards 2013. He was also a winner in the recently held Hong Kong 25th Human Rights Press Awards 2021 for Photography (Series) and Photography (Single Image) categories. His work on COVID-19 crisis, titled "Documenting India’s Greatest Healthcare Crisis", was also exhibited in the prestigious Visa pour l'Image photojournalism festival held in August 2021.

On 29 December 2021, Siddiqui was posthumously awarded 'the Journalist of the Year' for 2020 by the Mumbai Press Club. Chief Justice of India N. V. Ramana presented the annual 'RedInk Awards for Excellence in Journalism'. During the event CJI Ramana stated,

"He was a man with a magical eye and was rightly regarded as one of the foremost photojournalists of this era. If a picture can tell a thousand words, his photos were novels."

— Chief Justice of India N. V. Ramana

In 2022, Danish's photography of the COVID-19 pandemic in India was part of another Pulitzer Prize in Feature Photography winning photography package, increasing his tally to two Pulitzer Prizes.

| Award | Description | Year |
|---|---|---|
| Sony World Photography Awards | 3rd Place | 2013 |
| Atlanta Photojournalism Awards | 3rd Place | 2014 |
| Atlanta Photojournalism Awards | First Place | 2017 |
| The Pulitzer Prize | Winner in Feature Photography, Photography Staff of Reuters | 2018 |
| Hong Kong 25th Human Rights Press Awards | Photography (Series) and Photography (Single Image) Categories | 2021 |
| RedInk Awards for Excellence in Journalism | Journalist of the Year | 2021 |
| NPPA Best of Photojournalism Awards | Second Place, General News Category | 2022 |
| Reuters The Baron Award | Honors an individual who exemplifies the Reuters tradition of integrity and journalistic excellence | 2021 |
| Reuters Photojournalist of the Year Award | Photojournalist of the Year | 2022 |
| Reuters Photo of the Year | Winner | 2022 |
| Hugo Shong Journalist of The Year Award | For Reporting on Asia Affairs | 2022 |
| The Pulitzer Prize | Winner in Feature Photography, Photography Staff of Reuters | 2022 |

== Personal life ==
Siddiqui was a Muslim. He was married to Rike, a German national. They had two children.

== Death ==
Siddiqui was killed alongside a senior Afghan officer while covering a clash between Afghan Special Forces and Taliban insurgents in Spin Boldak, Kandahar, on 16 July 2021. His body was handed to the Afghan Red Crescent Society.

According to local Afghan officials as well as Taliban members, Siddiqui was killed by the Taliban in an ambush-crossfire. The Taliban mutilated and disrespected the body.

A detailed BBC investigative report by Vinit Khare published on 10 Aug 2021 confirmed witness accounts that Danish's body was indeed subjected to mutilation by the Taliban post his murder after displaying the body in the city center and only after intense negotiations by the Red Cross team did they return the body.

Another investigative report published by Reuters on 23 Aug 2021 said that Danish was killed after he was left behind by the Afghan forces in retreat. It quotes a Taliban fighter as saying "You’re bringing Indians to fight against us.” The officer replied, “Don’t shoot him. He’s a journalist.” “We already killed that guy,” the fighter answered which further lends credence to reports that Danish was executed post his capture. The Reuter report did not answer questions related to mutilation of the body, safety of Danish while covering such conflict, absence of security advisors, not recalling him back after 13 July attack. As per official statement issued by Reuters, an internal investigation is being conducted .

Michael Rubin (in an op-ed for the Washington Examiner on 29 July 2021) cited several unnamed sources to claim that the Taliban had eliminated him in a planned operation, which was covered-up by the US Government. He claimed that as part of this operation, they had attacked a mosque where Siddiqui had gone to receive first-aid, captured him, vetted his identity, and then executed him, after fighting off the Afghan forces who came to the rescue. The op-ed was immediately reproduced by multiple outlets of mainstream Indian media. (Note: Rubin is a resident scholar at the conservative think tank American Enterprise Institute and opposed to the incumbent government in America. He had been earlier implicated by an investigation by The Intercept for planting anti-Qatar stories, pursuant to lobby groups.)

The New York Times (NYT) failed to confirm the narrative of execution. However, the-then spokesman of Afghan National Defence and Security Forces (ANDSF) told India Today that Siddiqui was indeed executed by the Taliban. A report by News18 has since confirmed Rubin's version of events from Afghan and Indian intelligence officials; presence of about a dozen close range gunshot wounds on his torso were argued to corroborate his thesis.

=== Mutilation and return of body ===
The Taliban had mutilated his body before returning it though it denied doing this.

Ahmad Lodin, the head of the newspaper Afghan Orband Weekly, claimed to Newslaundry on 19 July that the Taliban had released Siddiqui's "disrespected" and "mutilated" corpse only after prolonged negotiations. Rubin, in his op-ed, claimed to have reviewed photographs and a video of Siddiqui's body from a source in the Indian Government, showing head-injuries and multiple bullet-wounds.

On 31 July, NYT reviewed several photographs of Siddiqui's corpse from multiple sources and confirmed these claims. Photographs taken shortly after his death, encircled apparently by Taliban insurgents, did not show any evidence of mutilation but photographs snapped after the corpse was recovered by government, showed such signs. An Afghan health official who had received the body at the Mirwais Hospital in Kandahar around 8pm, found Siddiqui's face to be unrecognizable, while Indian officials noted tire marks on the face and chest in addition to about 12 gunshot wounds in his body, resembling close-range injuries. The News18 report confirmed these details — Taliban had driven a Humvee over his face and chest, for reasons which were yet to be clear.

=== Reactions ===
Official

- India: Foreign Secretary Harsh Vardhan Shringla condemned the Taliban actions at an event of the United Nations Security Council. The Minister for Information and Broadcasting, Anurag Thakur, expressed his condolences.
- United States: U.S. Department of State Principal Deputy Spokesperson Jalina Porter called it a "tremendous loss".
- Afghanistan: President Ashraf Ghani expressed shock and offered his condolences while reiterating the affording of absolute protection to media personnel.
- United Nations: UN Secretary General António Guterres expressed his grief. UNESCO Director-General Audrey Azoulay meanwhile condemned the killing.

Unofficial

The Taliban denied knowledge of his presence in the ambushed entourage and expressed their regret at his death. Days before completion of a successful offensive in Afghanistan, they blamed Siddiqui for not coordinating with their forces. Siddique, a Reuters employee, was contractually obliged to not click or sell images to other agencies or media organisations such as Getty.

=== Burial ===
Siddiqui's coffin arrived in India, in the evening of 18 July 2021. The same night, his body was buried at the Jamia Millia Islamia graveyard. Hundreds attended the funeral.
