= Adnan Abidi =

Indian Photojournalist

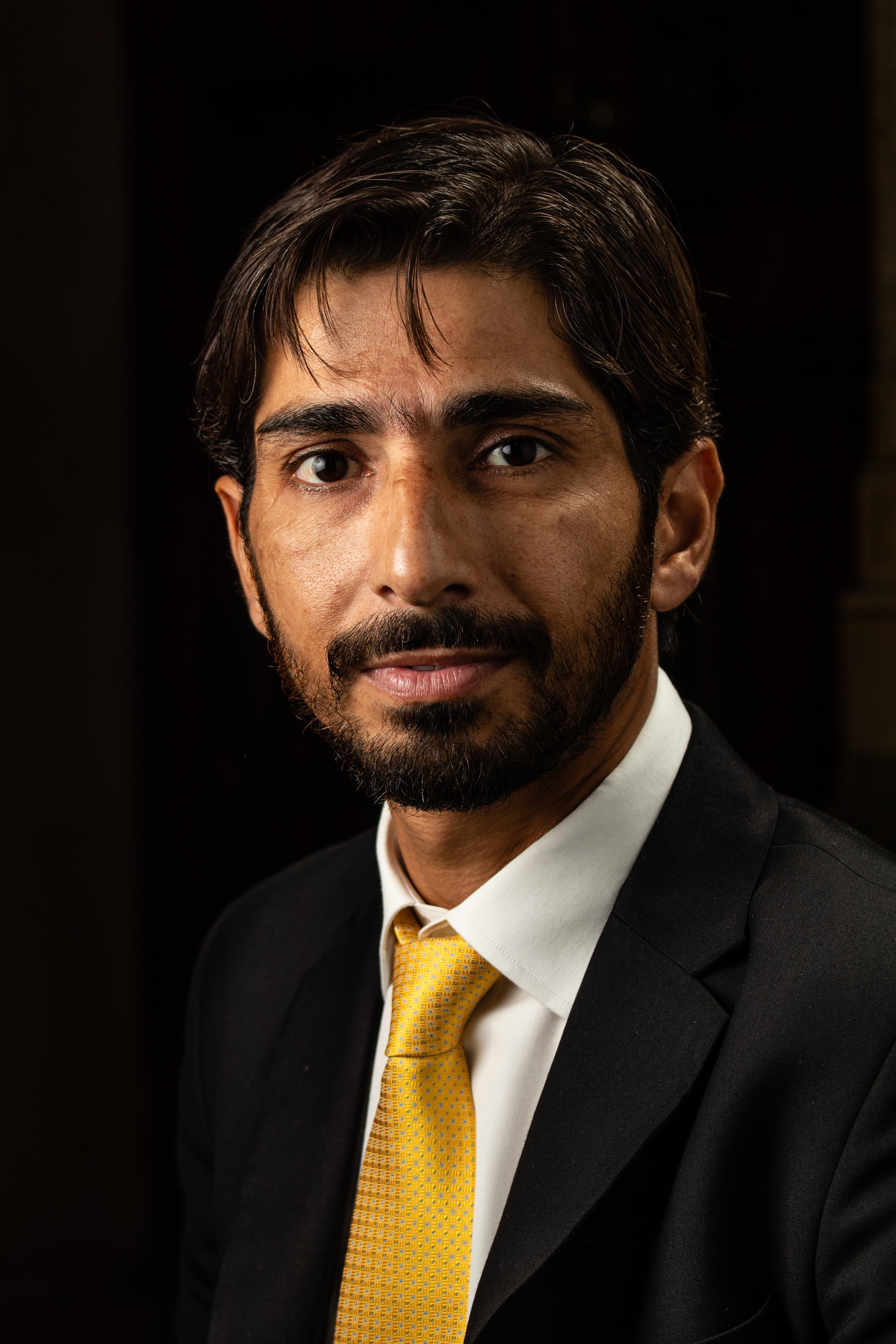
- Adnan Abidi in 2018
- Born: New Delhi, India
- Occupation: Photographer
- Employer: Reuters
- Known for: Three-time Pulitzer Prize Winner
- Website: adnanabidi.com

Adnan Abidi is an Indian photographer based in New Delhi. He has been part of three Pulitzer Prize-winning packages for photography as part of Reuters' photography team.

== Early life and Inspiration ==
Adnan's interest in photography began in his childhood. At age 11, he joined a mobile van library and used to borrow comic books. One day, he picked up a picture postcard book by veteran photographer S. Paul, which sparked his curiosity about photography, and he convinced his father to buy him a Yashica point-and-shoot camera. Though Adnan received no formal training, he learned through trial and error with guidance from senior photographers. Adnan has mentioned that in his first job at a local newswire agency, he was often given only limited leftover film, which he credits for teaching him "the habit of being selective".

== Work ==
Adnan started his career as a darkroom assistant in 1997. He worked at Pan-Asia News Agency, Indo Photo News, and Press Trust of India. Eventually, he started working for Reuters as a stringer and was later given a staff position. He has captured several challenging situations over the course of his career, including 1999 Kandahar hijack of Indian Airlines flight IC814, 2004 Indian Ocean earthquake and tsunami, 2005 Kashmir earthquake, the 2011–2012 Maldives political crisis, 2013 Cyclone Phailin in Orissa, 2015 Nepal earthquake and the 2016 Dhaka attack.

== Awards ==
In 2017, Abidi covered the exodus of Rohingyas and he and his colleague Danish Siddiqui became the first Indians to win a Pulitzer Prize for Feature Photography as part of the photography staff of Reuters.

He won the 2020 Pulitzer Prize for Breaking News Photography for his coverage of the 2019–20 Hong Kong protests.

In 2022, Abidi's work was part of another Pulitzer Prize-winning photography package which covered the COVID-19 pandemic in India, increasing his tally to three Pulitzer Prizes.

In 2022 Abidi’s work titled ‘Covid Horror in Delhi’ won NPPA Best of Photojournalism first place in the Breaking News Story category.
