= Pulitzer Prize for Feature Photography =

American photojournalism award

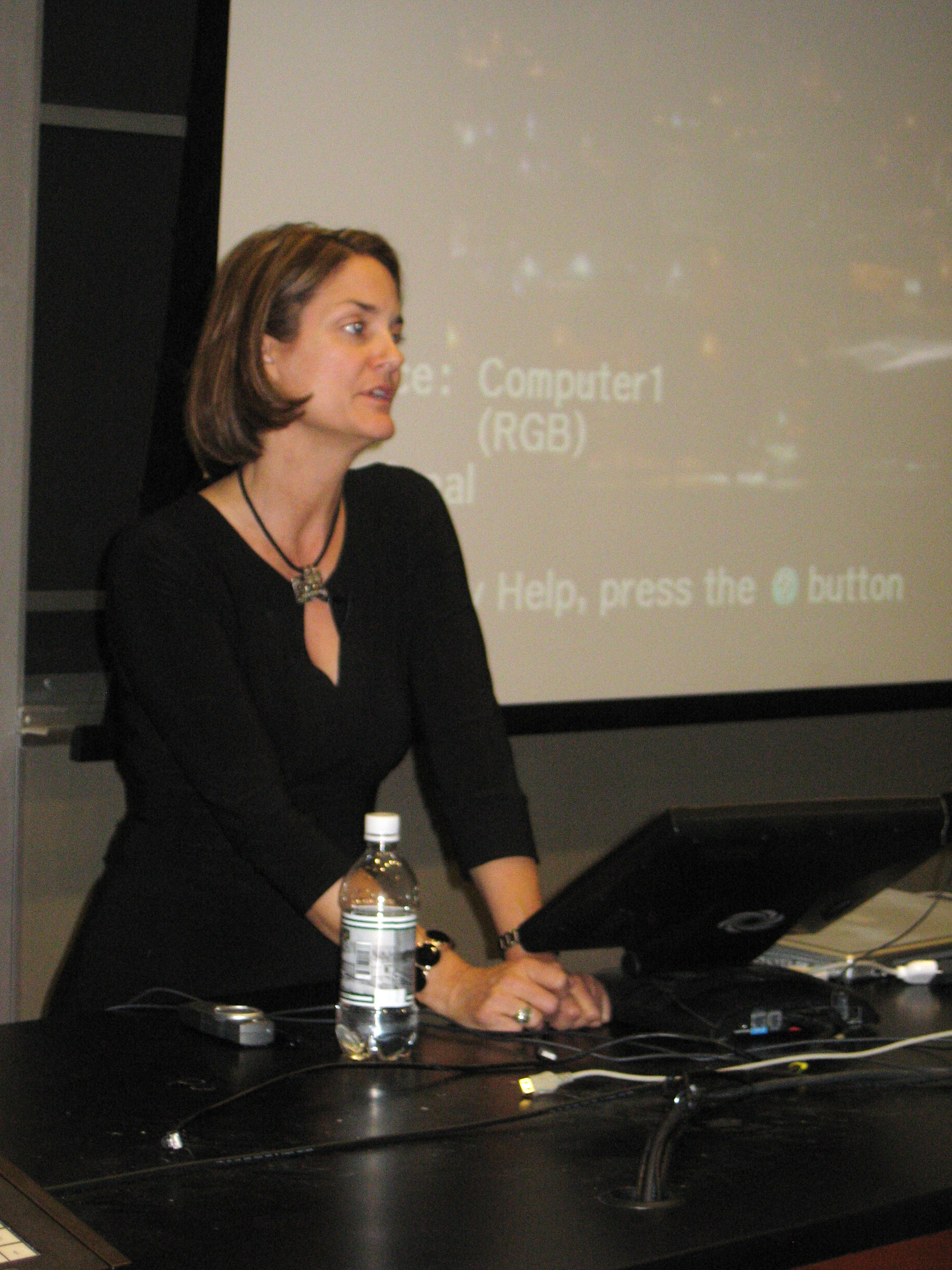
Photojournalist Carolyn Cole, who won the award in 2004

The Pulitzer Prize for Feature Photography is one of the American Pulitzer Prizes annually awarded for journalism. It recognizes a distinguished example of feature photography in black and white or color, which may consist of a photograph or photographs, a sequence or an album.

The Feature Photography prize was inaugurated in 1968 when the single Pulitzer Prize for Photography was replaced by the Feature prize and "Pulitzer Prize for Spot News Photography", renamed for "Pulitzer Prize for Breaking News Photography" in 2000.

== Winners and citations ==
One Feature Photography Pulitzer has been awarded annually from 1968, with the exception of 1985, when two prizes were awarded.

Year	Image	Name(s)	Publication	Rationale
1968		Toshio Sakai	United Press International	"for his Vietnam War combat photograph, 'Dreams of Better Times.'"
1969		Moneta Sleet Jr.	Ebony	"for his photograph of Martin Luther King Jr.'s widow and child, taken at Dr. King's funeral."
1970		Dallas Kinney	The Palm Beach Post	"for his portfolio of pictures of Florida migrant workers, 'Migration to Misery.'"
1971		Jack Dykinga	Chicago Sun-Times	"for his dramatic and sensitive photographs at the Lincoln and Dixon State Schools for the retarded in Illinois."
1972		David Hume Kennerly	United Press International	"for his dramatic photographs of the Vietnam War in 1971."
1973		Brian Lanker	The Topeka Capital-Journal	"for his sequence on childbirth, as exemplified by his photograph, 'Moment of Life.'"
1974		Slava Veder	Associated Press	"for his picture of the return of an American prisoner of war from captivity in North Vietnam."
1975		Matthew Lewis	The Washington Post	"for his photographs in color and black and white."
1976		Staff	Courier Journal	"for a comprehensive pictorial report on busing in Louisville's schools."
1977		Robin Hood	Chattanooga Times Free Press	"for his photograph of a disabled veteran and his child at an Armed Forces Day parade."
1978		J. Ross Baughman	Associated Press	"for three photographs from guerrilla areas in Rhodesia."
1979		Staff	Boston Herald	"for photographic coverage of the blizzard of 1978."
1980		Erwin Hagler	Dallas Times Herald	"for a series on the Western cowboy."
1980		David Kryszak	The Detroit News	"for a series on children of Cambodia."
1980		John Sunderland	The Denver Post	"for a series on living and dying in a hospice."
1981		Taro Yamasaki	Detroit Free Press	"for his photographs of Jackson, Michigan State Prison."
1981		Paul Beaver	The Clarion-Ledger	"for his photographs of the Mississippi Delta region."
1981		Michael Hayman	The Flint Journal	"for his photographs of automobile workers."
1982		John H. White	Chicago Sun-Times	"for consistently excellent work on a variety of subjects."
1982		Ellis Reed	San Francisco Examiner	"for photos of life in a public housing project."
1982		Walter Stricklin	The Florida Times-Union	"for coverage of a family confronting the death of one of its members."
1983		James B. Dickman	Dallas Times Herald	"for his telling photographs of life and death in El Salvador."
1983		Barron Ludlum	Dallas Times Herald	"for his picture story of a sick child's struggle for life."
1983		John H. White	Chicago Sun-Times	"for a variety of photographs depicting life in Chicago."
1984		Anthony Suau	The Denver Post	"for a series of photographs which depict the tragic effects of starvation in Ethiopia and for a single photograph of a woman at her husband's gravesite on Memorial Day."
1984		Stan Grossfeld	The Boston Globe	"for his series of unusual photographs which reveal the effects of war on the people of Lebanon." (Note: Moved by the Pulitzer board from the Spot News Photography category.)
1984		David Woo	The Dallas Morning News	"for his series of photographs depicting the child victims of war-torn Central America."
1985		Larry C. Price	The Philadelphia Inquirer	"for his series of photographs from Angola and El Salvador depicting their war-torn inhabitants."
1985		Stan Grossfeld	The Boston Globe	"for his series of photographs of the famine in Ethiopia and for his pictures of illegal aliens on the Mexican border."
1985		Stormi Greener	The Minnesota Star Tribune	"for her pictures of a dying girl which celebrated the girl's life."
1985		Sebastião Salgado	Magnum Photos	"for his dramatic photos of the famine in Ethiopia."
1985		Sebastião Salgado	The New York Times	"for his dramatic photos of the famine in Ethiopia."
1986		Tom Gralish	The Philadelphia Inquirer	"for his series of photographs of Philadelphia's homeless."
1986		David Leeson	The Dallas Morning News	"for his photographs of civil strife in South Africa."
1986		Michael Wirtz	Dallas Times Herald	"for his photographs depicting the decline and despair of the American farmer."
1987		David C. Peterson	The Des Moines Register	"for his photographs depicting the shattered dreams of American farmers."
1987		Cheryl Nuss	The Mercury News	"for her photographs of AIDS victims."
1987		April Saul	The Philadelphia Inquirer	"for her sensitive photographs of a Cambodian refugee child whose mother died of cancer."
1988		Michel du Cille	Miami Herald	"for photographs portraying the decay and subsequent rehabilitation of a housing project overrun by the drug crack."
1988		Barbara Ries	USA Today	"for a photograph taken on Veterans Day at the Vietnam Veterans Memorial in Washington, D.C."
1988		George Widman	Associated Press	"for his photograph of a homeless man in Philadelphia."
1989		Manny Crisostomo	Detroit Free Press	"for his series of photographs depicting student life at Southwestern High School in Detroit."
1989		Donna Bagby	Dallas Times Herald	"for her photograph of grieving Dallas police officers at the funeral of a slain patrolman."
1989		Frederic Larson	San Francisco Chronicle	"for his photographs of atomic bomb survivors in Japan."
1990		David C. Turnley	Detroit Free Press	"for photographs of the political uprisings in China and Eastern Europe."
1990		Stormi Greener	The Minnesota Star Tribune	"for a series of photographs of a mother and her struggle to resist committing child abuse."
1990		Robert Hallinen	Anchorage Daily News	"for their photographs of the Exxon Valdez oil spill and its aftermath."
1990		Erik Hill	Anchorage Daily News	"for their photographs of the Exxon Valdez oil spill and its aftermath."
1990		Paul Souders	Anchorage Daily News	"for their photographs of the Exxon Valdez oil spill and its aftermath."
1990		John Tlumacki	The Boston Globe	"for photographs of East and West Germans celebrating the collapse of the Berlin Wall."
1991		William Snyder	The Dallas Morning News	"for his photographs of ill and orphaned children living in subhuman conditions in Romania."
1991		Ron Cortes	The Philadelphia Inquirer	"for his photographic essay about a senior citizen who returned to her former high school to complete her education."
1991		Jay Mather	The Sacramento Bee	"for his series of photographs depicting Yosemite National Park and its visitors during the park's centennial year."
1992		John Kaplan	Block Newspapers	"for his photographs depicting the diverse lifestyles of seven 21-year-olds across the United States."
1992		Paul Kuroda	The Orange County Register	"for his photographs of the dangerous journey of illegal immigrants across the U.S.-Mexican border."
1992		Bill Snead	The Washington Post	"for his photographs depicting the harshness and misery of the Kurdish refugee camps."
1993		Staff	Associated Press	"for its portfolio of images drawn from the 1992 presidential campaign."
1993		Yunghi Kim	The Boston Globe	"for her photographs of the famine, war and American relief efforts in Somalia."
1993		Staff	Associated Press	"for its photographs from Somalia of the struggle for survival of a nation and its people."
1994		Kevin Carter	The New York Times	"for a picture first published in The New York Times of a starving Sudanese girl who collapsed on her way to a feeding center while a vulture waited nearby."
1994		Stan Grossfeld	The Boston Globe	"for 'The Exhausted Earth,' a year-long series depicting the social, medical and environmental crises caused by the depletion of natural resources."
1994		April Saul	The Philadelphia Inquirer	"for 'American Dreamers,' her series of photographs of a working-class family coping with hardships while striving for a better life."
1994		Staff	Associated Press	"for its collection of images about the Middle East, including those that illustrate the turbulent lives of Arabs and Jews in Israel."
1995		Staff	Associated Press	"for its portfolio of photographs chronicling the horror and devastation in Rwanda."
1995		Carl Bower	Newhouse News Service	"for his series of photographs, published by Newhouse News Service, of a woman's fight against breast cancer."
1995		Staff	Press-Telegram	"for its collection of life-affirming images, drawn from the daily activities of local residents."
1996		Stephanie Welsh	Newhouse News Service	"for her shocking sequence of photos, published by Newhouse News Service, of a female circumcision rite in Kenya."
1996		Stan Grossfeld	The Boston Globe	"for his photographs documenting how the lives of two teenagers were transformed by the birth of their child."
1996		David C. Turnley	Detroit Free Press	"for his series of portraits from Bosnia."
1997		Alexander Zemlianichenko	Associated Press	"for his photograph of Russian president Boris Yeltsin dancing at a rock concert during his campaign for re-election."
1997		Jeffrey Brown	Copley Press	"for his series of photographs chronicling an illegal immigrant's clandestine journey from Mexico to the United States."
1997		Jon Kral	Miami Herald	"for his photographs documenting the horrifying conditions in Venezuelan prisons."
1997		Michele McDonald	The Boston Globe	"for her photographs of a woman with terminal breast cancer preparing for her death."
1998		Clarence Williams	Los Angeles Times	"for his powerful images documenting the plight of young children with parents addicted to alcohol and drugs."
1998		Allan Detrich	Block Newspapers	"for his revealing photographic account of a secret interstate network of individuals who aid parents and children fleeing the threat of sexual abuse."
1998		Joseph Stefanchik	The Dallas Morning News	"for his gripping photographs depicting the effects of war and land mines in Angola."
1999		Staff	Associated Press	"for its striking collection of photographs of the key players and events stemming from President Clinton's affair with Monica Lewinsky and the ensuing impeachment hearings."
1999		Daniel Anderson	The Orange County Register	"for his skillful and moving portraits of local children growing up in decaying residential motels."
1999		Bill Greene	The Boston Globe	"for his inspirational images that trace the work of Donald Anderson, a descendent of slaves, who helps the residents of poor Southern communities assume civic responsibility and improve their lives."
2000		Carol Guzy	The Washington Post	"for their intimate and poignant images depicting the plight of the Kosovo refugees."
2000		Candace Barbot	Miami Herald	"their photographs of Liberty City, a neighborhood crippled by drugs and violence, which detail the community's effort to reclaim the area."
2000		Nuri Vallbona	Miami Herald	"their photographs of Liberty City, a neighborhood crippled by drugs and violence, which detail the community's effort to reclaim the area."
2000		Staff	Telegram and Gazette	"for its moving photographs of the grief and devastation that followed a local fire that killed six firefighters."
2001		Matt Rainey	The Star-Ledger	"for his emotional photographs that illustrate the care and recovery of two students critically burned in a dormitory fire at Seton Hall University."
2001		David Guttenfelder	Associated Press	"for his moving photographs of North and South Koreans visiting relatives they had not seen in half a century, and other images generated by the Korean governments' reunification efforts."
2001		Marc Piscotty	Rocky Mountain News	"for his illuminating images of suburban high school students facing adulthood."
2002		Staff	The New York Times	"for its photographs chronicling the pain and the perseverance of people enduring protracted conflict in Afghanistan and Pakistan."
2002		J. Albert Diaz	Miami Herald	"for his diverse images portraying American life in the sprawl of South Florida's Broward County."
2002		Hilda Perez	Sun Sentinel	"for their compelling and explanatory images illustrating the devastating impact of AIDS in the Caribbean."
2002		Mike Stocker	Sun Sentinel	"for their compelling and explanatory images illustrating the devastating impact of AIDS in the Caribbean."
2002		Enrique Valentin	Sun Sentinel	"for their compelling and explanatory images illustrating the devastating impact of AIDS in the Caribbean."
2003		Don Bartletti	The New York Times	"for his memorable portrayal of how undocumented Central American youths, often facing deadly danger, travel north to the United States."
2003		Matt Black	Los Angeles Times	"for his striking images that documented the little known legacy of black sharecroppers who migrated to California's San Joaquin Valley during the Depression."
2003		Brad Clift	Hartford Courant	"for 'Heroin Town,' his dramatic pictures that spotlighted heroin addiction in a Connecticut city and helped produce positive change."
2004		Carolyn Cole	Los Angeles Times	"for her cohesive, behind-the-scenes look at the effects of civil war in Liberia, with special attention to innocent citizens caught in the conflict."
2004		Pauline Lubens	The Mercury News	"for their imaginative and sophisticated coverage of California's extraordinary recall election."
2004		Dai Sugano	The Mercury News	"for their imaginative and sophisticated coverage of California's extraordinary recall election."
2004		Patrick Tehan	The Mercury News	"for their imaginative and sophisticated coverage of California's extraordinary recall election."
2004		Damir Sagolj	Reuters	"for his unforgettable picture of a burly American medic in Iraq cuddling a child whose mother had just been killed in a crossfire." (Note: Moved by the Pulitzer board from the Breaking News Photography category.)
2005		Deanne Fitzmaurice	San Francisco Chronicle	"for her sensitive photo essay on an Oakland hospital's effort to mend an Iraqi boy nearly killed by an explosion."
2005		Jim Gehrz	The Minnesota Star Tribune	"for his poignant portrait of a woman soldier's struggle to recover from grave shrapnel wounds to her head."
2005		Luis Sinco	Los Angeles Times	"for his iconic photograph of an exhausted U.S. Marine's face after a daylong battle in Iraq."
2006		Todd Heisler	Rocky Mountain News	"for his haunting, behind-the-scenes look at funerals for Colorado Marines who return from Iraq in caskets."
2006		Mike Stocker	Sun Sentinel	"for his imaginative exploration of Holocaust survivors as Judaism faces a new century."
2006		Damon Winter	Los Angeles Times	"for his sensitive portrayal of two remote Eskimo villages coping with memories of sexual abuse by a missionary 30 years ago."
2007		Renée C. Byer	The Sacramento Bee	"for her intimate portrayal of a single mother and her young son as he loses his battle with cancer."
2007		Mary Calvert	The Washington Times	"for her haunting depiction of Sub-Sahara African women afflicted with fistula after childbirth."
2007		Gary Coronado	The Palm Beach Post	"for his vivid images of Central Americans who, desperate to enter America illegally, risk their lives leaping on Mexican freight trains rumbling northward."
2008		Preston Gannaway	Concord Monitor	"for her intimate chronicle of a family coping with a parent's terminal illness."
2008		David Guttenfelder	Associated Press	"for his harrowing portfolio of Vietnamese children afflicted by the toxic legacy of Agent Orange, three decades after the Vietnam War ended."
2008		Mona Reeder	The Dallas Morning News	"for her memorable pictures of disadvantaged Texans hidden amid the state's economic abundance."
2009		Damon Winter	The New York Times	"for his memorable array of pictures deftly capturing multiple facets of Barack Obama's presidential campaign."
2009		Carol Guzy	The Washington Post	"for her powerfully intimate coverage of the perils and sorrow of childbirth in Sierra Leone, where women face the world's highest rate of maternal mortality."
2009		Sonya Hebert	The Dallas Morning News	"for her empathetic portrait of palliative care in a Texas medical center as terminally ill patients cope with the end of their lives."
2010		Craig F. Walker	The Denver Post	"for his intimate portrait of a teenager who joins the Army at the height of insurgent violence in Iraq, poignantly searching for meaning and manhood."
2010		Mary Calvert	The Washington Times	"for her courageous work published in The Washington Times that vividly documents how rapes, by the tens of thousands, have become a weapon of war in Congo."
2010		Robert Cohen	St. Louis Post-Dispatch	"for his sensitive portrayal of homeless suburban families camping in motels during the recession, often recording memorable emotional moments."
2011		Barbara Davidson	Los Angeles Times	"for her intimate story of innocent victims trapped in the city's crossfire of deadly gang violence."
2011		Todd Heisler	The New York Times	"for his sensitive portrayal of a large Colombian clan carrying a genetic mutation that causes Alzheimer's disease in early middle age."
2011		Greg Kahn	Naples Daily News	"for his pictures that show the mixed impact of the recession in Florida's loss of jobs and homes for some but profit for others."
2012		Craig F. Walker	The Denver Post	"for his compassionate chronicle of an honorably discharged veteran, home from Iraq and struggling with a severe case of post-traumatic stress, images that enable viewers to better grasp a national issue."
2012		Ng Han Guan	Associated Press	"for their extraordinary portrayal of daily life inside the reclusive nation of North Korea, including scenes after the death of Kim Jong Il."
2012		David Guttenfelder	Associated Press	"for their extraordinary portrayal of daily life inside the reclusive nation of North Korea, including scenes after the death of Kim Jong Il."
2012		Rafael Wober	Associated Press	"for their extraordinary portrayal of daily life inside the reclusive nation of North Korea, including scenes after the death of Kim Jong Il."
2012		Francine Orr	Los Angeles Times	"for her poignant portrait of the suffering by desperate families and misunderstood children who live with autism."
2013		Javier Manzano	Agence France-Presse	"for his extraordinary picture, distributed by Agence France-Presse, of two Syrian rebel soldiers tensely guarding their position as beams of light stream through bullet holes in a nearby metal wall."
2013		Liz Baylen	Los Angeles Times	"for her intimate essay, shot in shadowy black and white, documenting the shattered lives of people entangled in prescription drug abuse."
2013		Renée C. Byer	The Sacramento Bee	"for her heartwarming photographs of a grandfather raising three grandchildren after the violent death of his daughter and the loss of his wife to cancer."
2014		Josh Haner	The New York Times	"for his moving essay on a Boston Marathon bomb blast victim who lost most of both legs and now is painfully rebuilding his life."
2014		Lacy Atkins	San Francisco Chronicle	"for her revealing portrait of an Oakland school's efforts to help African-American boys avoid neighborhood risks and profit from education."
2014		Michael Williamson	The Washington Post	"for his portfolio of pictures exploring the multi-faceted impact of the nation's food stamp program on 47 million recipients."
2015		Daniel Berehulak	The New York Times	"for his gripping, courageous photographs of the Ebola epidemic in West Africa."
2015		Bülent Kılıç	Agence France-Presse	"for his compelling photographs of Kurds fleeing ISIS attacks in small Kurdish towns on the Syrian-Turkish border."
2015		Lisa Krantz	San Antonio Express-News	"for chilling photographs that document the hard road Central American migrants must follow to seek refuge in the United States."
2015		Jerry Lara	San Antonio Express-News	"for chilling photographs that document the hard road Central American migrants must follow to seek refuge in the United States."
2015		Bob Owen	San Antonio Express-News	"for chilling photographs that document the hard road Central American migrants must follow to seek refuge in the United States."
2016		Jessica Rinaldi	The Boston Globe	"for the raw and revealing photographic story of a boy who strives to find his footing after abuse by those he trusted."
2016		Jessica Rinaldi	The Boston Globe	"for photographs that put a human face to the American opioid epidemic by chronicling the struggles of a single addict in Massachusetts."
2016		Staff	The Post and Courier	"for photographs that tell from many angles the story of a racially motivated church shooting and its sorrowful but sometimes also heartening aftermath."
2017		E. Jason Wambsgans	Chicago Tribune	"for a superb portrayal of a 10-year-old boy and his mother striving to put the boy's life back together after he survived a shooting in Chicago."
2017		Katie Falkenberg	Los Angeles Times	"for a photo essay from the front lines of Brazil's war on Zika that showed the vulnerability, fear and love of mothers coping with the crisis."
2017		Jake May	The Flint Journal	"for striking, wonderfully conceived photographs from Flint's contaminated-water crisis that told a challenging story in human terms."
2018		Staff	Reuters	"for shocking photographs that exposed the world to the violence Rohingya refugees faced in fleeing Myanmar."
2018		Kevin Frayer	Getty Images	"for profoundly moving and historic pictures that portrayed Rohingya Muslims with dignity and grace as they fled ethnic cleansing in Myanmar."
2018		Meridith Kohut	The New York Times	"for wrenching images from the streets, homes and hospitals of Venezuela, where government policies have resulted in widespread malnutrition and starvation of children."
2018		Lisa Krantz	San Antonio Express-News	"for intimate, poetic images that captured the vibrant life of a boy born with an incurable, rare disorder, and his physical, spiritual and emotional journey."
2019		Lorenzo Tugnoli	The Washington Post	"for brilliant photo storytelling of the tragic famine in Yemen, shown through images in which beauty and composure were intertwined with devastation."
2019		Lynn Johnson	National Geographic	"for a compelling, dignified photo narrative that provides an intimate look at the youngest face transplant recipient in the U.S."
2019		Maggie Steber	National Geographic	"for a compelling, dignified photo narrative that provides an intimate look at the youngest face transplant recipient in the U.S."
2019		Craig F. Walker	The Boston Globe	"for superb photography and sophisticated visual storytelling that brought understanding to the story of a young boy living with a complex developmental disability."
2020		Channi Anand	Associated Press	"for striking images captured during a communications blackout in Kashmir depicting life in the contested territory as India stripped it of its semi-autonomy."
2020		Mukhtar Khan	Associated Press	"for striking images captured during a communications blackout in Kashmir depicting life in the contested territory as India stripped it of its semi-autonomy."
2020		Dar Yasin	Associated Press	"for striking images captured during a communications blackout in Kashmir depicting life in the contested territory as India stripped it of its semi-autonomy."
2020		Mary Calvert	The New York Times	"for work published by The New York Times and Yahoo News that look intimately at male sexual assault survivors in the armed forces, and the lasting effects of trauma on them and their families."
2020		Mary Calvert	Yahoo News	"for work published by The New York Times and Yahoo News that look intimately at male sexual assault survivors in the armed forces, and the lasting effects of trauma on them and their families."
2020		Erin Clark	The Boston Globe	"for respectful and compassionate photography of a working Maine family as it falls into homelessness and finds new housing, albeit precarious."
2021		Emilio Morenatti	Associated Press	"for a poignant series of photographs that takes viewers into the lives of the elderly in Spain struggling during the COVID-19 pandemic."
2021		Tyler Hicks	The New York Times	"for searing images that capture the toll of the coronavirus deep in Brazil's Amazon, and how it ravaged the region's indigenous people."
2021		Staff	Getty Images	"for thorough coverage of the impact of the COVID-19 pandemic on the global community."
2022		Adnan Abidi	Reuters	"for images of COVID's toll in India that balanced intimacy and devastation, while offering viewers a heightened sense of place."
2022		Amit Dave	Reuters	"for images of COVID's toll in India that balanced intimacy and devastation, while offering viewers a heightened sense of place."
2022		Sanna Irshad Mattoo	Reuters	"for images of COVID's toll in India that balanced intimacy and devastation, while offering viewers a heightened sense of place."
2022		Danish Siddiqui	Reuters	"for images of COVID's toll in India that balanced intimacy and devastation, while offering viewers a heightened sense of place."
2022		Gabrielle Lurie	San Francisco Chronicle	"for intimate and harrowing images of a mother's attempts to care for her homeless, drug-addicted daughter."
2022		Staff	Reuters	"for images of climate change collected around the globe, effectively portraying extreme and dangerous natural events as common and widespread threats to human life."
2023		Christina House	Los Angeles Times	"for an intimate look into the life of a pregnant 22-year-old woman living on the street in a tent—images that show her emotional vulnerability as she tries and ultimately loses the struggle to raise her child."
2023		Stephen Lam	San Francisco Chronicle	"for their painstaking documentation of fentanyl addiction in the city that led officials to create supervised drug consumption locations and voters to approve an oversight commission for the homeless hotels where 40% of overdoses occur."
2023		Gabrielle Lurie	San Francisco Chronicle	"for their painstaking documentation of fentanyl addiction in the city that led officials to create supervised drug consumption locations and voters to approve an oversight commission for the homeless hotels where 40% of overdoses occur."
2023		Staff	Associated Press	"for images capturing the vulnerability, trauma and defiance of elderly Ukrainians caught in the Russian invasion, many of them unable or unwilling to flee the carnage. "
2024		Staff	Associated Press	"for poignant photographs chronicling unprecedented masses of migrants and their arduous journey north from Colombia to the border of the United States."
2024		Nanna Heitmann	The New York Times	"for illuminating photographs portraying a generation living under President Vladimir Putin's resurgent nationalism while Russia is at war in Ukraine."
2024		Hannah Reyes Morales	The New York Times	"for a creative series of photographs documenting a 'youthquake' occurring in Africa where, by 2050, the continent will account for one-quarter of the world's population and one-third of its young people."
2025		Moises Saman	The New Yorker	"for his haunting black and white images of Sednaya Prison in Syria that capture the traumatic legacy of Assad's torture chambers, forcing viewers to confront the raw horrors faced by prisoners and contemplate the scars on society."
2025		Lynsey Addario	The New York Times	"for her sensitive and wrenching photo essay of a young Ukrainian girl with a rare eye cancer whose treatment was thwarted by the war."
2025		Staff	Associated Press	"for their brave and gripping imagery from Gaza that steps back from the front lines to chronicle daily life as it continues in a war zone."
2026		Jahi Chikwendiu	The Washington Post	"for a heart-wrenching and achingly beautiful photo essay on a young family welcoming the birth of their first child as the father is slowly dying from cancer."
2026		Gabrielle Lurie	San Francisco Chronicle	"for a deeply intimate and sensitive series illustrating the brutal reality of the fentanyl crisis in America through three people affected by it."
2026		Staff	The New York Times	"for an in-depth report on the ubiquitous, deadly drone warfare devastating Ukraine."

== See also ==
- List of photographs considered the most important
