= 2001 Pulitzer Prize =

Awards for journalism and related fields

The 2001 Pulitzer Prizes were announced on April 16, 2001.

== Journalism awards ==
Public Service	The Oregonian	" ... for its detailed and unflinching examination of systematic problems within the U.S. Immigration and Naturalization Service, including harsh treatment of foreign nationals and other widespread abuses, which prompted various reforms."
Breaking News Reporting	The Miami Herald	" ... for its balanced and gripping on-the-scene coverage of the pre-dawn raid by federal agents that took the Cuban boy Elián González from his Miami relatives and reunited him with his Cuban father."
Investigative Reporting	David Willman of the Los Angeles Times	" ... for his pioneering exposé of seven unsafe prescription drugs that had been approved by the Food and Drug Administration, and an analysis of the policy reforms that had reduced the agency's effectiveness."
Explanatory Reporting	Chicago Tribune	" ... for "Gateway to Gridlock," its clear and compelling profile of the chaotic American air traffic system."
Beat Reporting	David Cay Johnston of The New York Times	" ... for his penetrating and enterprising reporting that exposed loopholes and inequities in the U.S. tax code, which was instrumental in bringing about reforms."
National Reporting	The New York Times	" ... for its compelling and memorable series exploring racial experiences and attitudes across contemporary America."
International Reporting	Ian Johnson of The Wall Street Journal; Paul Salopek of Chicago Tribune	" ... for his revealing stories about victims of the People's Republic of China government's often brutal suppression of the Falun Gong movement and the implications of that campaign for the future. " ... for his reporting on the political strife and disease epidemics ravaging Africa, witnessed firsthand as he traveled, sometimes by canoe, through rebel-controlled regions of the Congo."
Feature Writing	Tom Hallman, Jr. of The Oregonian	" ... for his poignant profile of a disfigured 14-year old boy who elects to have life-threatening surgery in an effort to improve his appearance."
Commentary	Dorothy Rabinowitz of The Wall Street Journal	" ... for her articles on American society and culture."
Criticism	Gail Caldwell of The Boston Globe	" ... for her insightful observations on contemporary life and literature."
Editorial Writing	David Moats of Rutland Herald, Rutland, Vermont	" ... for his even-handed and influential series of editorials commenting on the divisive issues arising from civil unions for same-sex couples."
Editorial Cartooning	Ann Telnaes of The Los Angeles Times Syndicate	
Breaking News Photography	Alan Diaz of the Associated Press	" ... for his photograph of armed U.S. federal agents seizing the Cuban boy Elián Gonzalez from his relatives' Miami home."
Feature Photography	Matt Rainey of The Star-Ledger, Newark, New Jersey	" ... for his emotional photographs that illustrate the care and recovery of two students critically burned in a dormitory fire at Seton Hall University."

== Letters awards ==
- Fiction:
  - The Amazing Adventures of Kavalier & Clay by Michael Chabon (Random House)
- History:
  - Founding Brothers: The Revolutionary Generation by Joseph J. Ellis (Alfred A. Knopf)
- Biography or Autobiography:
  - W.E.B. Du Bois: The Fight for Equality and the American Century, 1919-1963 by David Levering Lewis (Henry Holt and Company)
- Poetry:
  - Different Hours by Stephen Dunn (W.W. Norton & Company)
- General Nonfiction
  - Hirohito and the Making of Modern Japan by Herbert P. Bix (HarperCollins)

== Arts awards ==
- Drama:
  - Proof by David Auburn (Faber and Faber)
- Music:
  - Symphony No. 2 for String Orchestra by John Corigliano (G. Schirmer)- Premiered by the Boston Symphony Orchestra on November 30, 2000, at Symphony Hall, Boston
