= 2012 Pulitzer Prize =

Awards for journalism and related fields

The 2012 Pulitzer Prizes were awarded on April 16, 2012, by the Pulitzer Prize Board for work during the 2011 calendar year. The deadline for submitting entries was January 25, 2012. For the first time, all entries for journalism were required to be submitted electronically. In addition, the criteria for the Pulitzer Prize for Local Reporting has been revised to focus on real-time reporting of breaking news. For the eleventh time in Pulitzer's history (and the first since 1977), no book received the Fiction Prize.

== Reaction to fiction prize decision ==
A three-member panel nominated three books, which were then sent to the 20-member Pulitzer Prize Board. Because no book received a majority of the votes from the board members, no prize was given. This was the first time since 1977, and the eleventh time in Pulitzer history that there was no winner in the fiction category.

Maureen Corrigan, a jury member, responded to the board's decision by saying, "We nominated three novels we believe to be more than Pulitzer-worthy – David Foster Wallace's The Pale King, Karen Russell's Swamplandia! and Denis Johnson's Train Dreams. That the board declined to award the prize to any of these superb novels is inexplicable."

Jury member Michael Cunningham wrote a lengthy two-part essay in The New Yorker called "What Really Happened This Year" that described the process of selecting the shortlist titles and reaction to no prize being chosen.

Lev Grossman, book critic for Time, wrote that, "I support the Pulitzer board's decision not to give out an award for fiction this year." He argued that "great" novels are relatively rare, and that there are years in which a "masterpiece" will not be published. He also cautioned against the glut of book awards, writing, "It bothers me to see great work neglected, but it bothers me almost as much to see mediocre books over-praised."

In reaction, The New York Times invited eight literary experts to pick their winners for the prize. The experts and their picks were Sam Anderson and Macy Halford: The Pale King by David Foster Wallace; Maud Newton: Pym by Mat Johnson; Gregory Cowles: The Year We Left Home by Jean Thompson; Garth Risk Hallberg: The Angel Esmeralda by Don DeLillo; Laila Lalami: State of Wonder by Ann Patchett; Alexander Chee: Silver Sparrow by Tayari Jones, and John Williams: Open City by Teju Cole.

== Prizes ==
There were 21 prizes awarded in three categories. The prizes were announced on April 16, 2012. Each prize is accompanied by a payment of US$10,000 The winners and finalists are:

=== Journalism ===
Public Service
The Philadelphia Inquirer "for its exploration of pervasive violence in the city's schools".
The Miami Herald "for its exposure of deadly abuses and lax state oversight in Florida's assisted-living facilities for the elderly and mentally ill".
The New York Times "for the work of Danny Hakim and Russ Buettner that revealed rapes, beatings and more than 1,200 unexplained deaths over the past decade of developmentally disabled people in New York State group homes".

Breaking News Reporting
The Tuscaloosa News staff "for its enterprising coverage of a deadly tornado".
The Arizona Republic staff "for its comprehensive coverage of the mass shooting that killed six and wounded 13, including Congresswoman Gabrielle Giffords, an exemplary use of journalistic tools, from Twitter to video to written reports and features".
Wisconsin State Journal staff "for its energetic coverage of 27 days of around-the-clock protests in the State Capitol over collective bargaining rights".

Investigative Reporting
Matt Apuzzo, Adam Goldman, Eileen Sullivan and Chris Hawley of the Associated Press "for their spotlighting of the New York Police Department's clandestine spying program that monitored daily life in Muslim communities".
Michael J. Berens and Ken Armstrong of The Seattle Times "for their investigation of how a little known governmental body in Washington State moved vulnerable patients from safer pain-control medication to methadone".
Gary Marx and David Jackson of the Chicago Tribune "for their exposure of a neglectful state justice system that allowed dozens of brutal criminals to evade punishment by fleeing the country, sparking moves for corrective change".

Explanatory Reporting
David Kocieniewski of The New York Times "for his lucid series that penetrated a legal thicket to explain how the nation's wealthiest citizens and corporations often exploited loopholes and avoided taxes."
Tom Frank of USA Today for his sharply focused exploration of inflated pensions for state and local employees, enhancing stories with graphic material to show how state legislators pump up retirement benefits in creative but unconscionable ways".
The Wall Street Journal staff "for its tenacious exploration of how personal information is harvested from the cellphones and computers of unsuspecting Americans by corporations and public officials in a largely unmonitored realm of modern life".

Local Reporting
Sara Ganim and members of The Patriot-News Staff, (Harrisburg, Pennsylvania) "for courageously revealing and adeptly covering the explosive Penn State sex scandal".
Staff of California Watch "for its rigorous probe of deficient earthquake protection in the construction of public schools across the state".
A.M. Sheehan and Matthew Hongoltz-Hetling of The Advertiser Democrat (Norway, Maine) "for their tenacious exposure of disgraceful conditions in federally supported housing in a small rural community".

National Reporting
David Wood of The Huffington Post "for his riveting exploration of the physical and emotional challenges facing American soldiers severely wounded in Iraq and Afghanistan during a decade of war".
Jeff Donn of the Associated Press "for his diligent exposure of federal regulators easing or neglecting to enforce safety standards as aging nuclear power plants exceed their original life spans".
Jessica Silver-Greenberg of The Wall Street Journal "for her compelling examination of aggressive debt collectors whose often questionable tactics, profitable but largely unseen by the public, vexed borrowers hard hit by the nation's financial crisis".

International Reporting
Jeffrey Gettleman of The New York Times "for his vivid reports, often at personal peril, on famine and conflict in East Africa".
The New York Times staff "for its powerful exploration of serious mistakes concealed by authorities in Japan after a tsunami and earthquake devastated the nation, and caused a nuclear disaster".
Thomson Reuters staff for "its well-crafted reports on the momentous revolution in Libya that went beyond battlefield dispatches to tell the wider story of discontent, conflict and the role of outside powers".

Feature Writing
Eli Sanders of The Stranger (Seattle) for The Bravest Woman in Seattle, "his haunting story of a woman who survived a brutal attack that took the life of her partner".
John Branch of The New York Times for Derek Boogaard: A Boy Learns to Brawl, "his deeply reported story of Derek Boogaard, a professional hockey player valued for his brawling, whose tragic story shed light on a popular sport's disturbing embrace of potentially brain-damaging violence".
Corinne Reilly of The Virginian-Pilot (Norfolk, Virginia) for A Chance in Hell, "her inspiring stories that bring the reader side-by-side with the medical professionals seeking to save the lives of gravely injured American soldiers at a combat hospital in Afghanistan".

Commentary
Mary Schmich of The Chicago Tribune "for her wide range of down-to-earth columns that reflect the character and capture the culture of her famed city".
Nicholas Kristof of The New York Times "for his valorous columns that transport readers into dangerous international scenes".
Steve Lopez of the Los Angeles Times "for his engaging commentary on death and dying, marked by pieces on his own father's rapid physical and mental decline".

Criticism
Wesley Morris of The Boston Globe "for his smart, inventive film criticism".
Philip Kennicott of The Washington Post "for his ambitious and insightful cultural criticism, taking on topical events from the uprisings in Egypt to the dedication of the Ground Zero memorial".
Tobi Tobias "for work appearing on ArtsJournal.com that reveals passion as well as deep historical knowledge of dance".

Editorial Writing
(No prize awarded)
Paula Dwyer and Mark Whitehouse of Bloomberg News "for their analysis of and prescription for the European debt crisis, dealing with important technical questions in ways that the average readers could grasp".
Tim Nickens, Joni James, John Hill and Robyn Blumner of Tampa Bay Times (Tampa, Florida) "for editorials that examined the policies of a new, inexperienced governor and their impact on the state".
Aki Soga and Michael Townsend, of The Burlington Free Press (Burlington, Vermont) "for their campaign that resulted in the state's first reform of open government laws in 35 years".

Editorial Cartooning
Matt Wuerker of POLITICO "for his consistently fresh, funny cartoons, especially memorable for lampooning the partisan conflict that engulfed Washington."
Matt Bors, syndicated by Universal Uclick "for his pungent work outside the traditional style of American cartooning"
Jack Ohman, The Oregonian (Portland, Oregon) "for his clever daily cartoons and a distinctive Sunday panel on local issues in which his reporting was as important as his artistic execution".

Breaking News Photography
Massoud Hossaini of Agence France-Presse "for his heartbreaking image of a girl crying in fear after a suicide bomber's attack at a crowded shrine in Kabul".
Carolyn Cole and Brian van der Brug of the Los Angeles Times "for their illumination of epic disasters in Japan, documenting the brutality of nature as well as the durability of the human spirit".
John Moore, Peter Macdiarmid, and Chris Hondros of Getty Images "for their brave coverage of revolutionary protests known as the Arab Spring".

Feature Photography
Craig F. Walker of The Denver Post "for his compassionate chronicle of an honorably discharged veteran, home from Iraq and struggling with a severe case of post-traumatic stress".
David Guttenfelder, Ng Han Guan, and Rafael Wober of the Associated Press "for their extraordinary portrayal of daily life inside the reclusive nation of North Korea".
Francine Orr of the Los Angeles Times "for her poignant portrait of the suffering by desperate families and misunderstood children who live with autism".

=== Letters and drama ===
Fiction
(No prize awarded)
Train Dreams by Denis Johnson
Swamplandia! by Karen Russell
The Pale King by David Foster Wallace

Drama
Water by the Spoonful by Quiara Alegría Hudes
Other Desert Cities by Jon Robin Baitz
Sons of the Prophet by Stephen Karam

History
Malcolm X: A Life of Reinvention by Manning Marable
Empires, Nations & Families: A History of the North American West, 1800–1860 by Anne F. Hyde
The Eleventh Day: The Full Story of 9/11 and Osama Bin Laden by Anthony Summers and Robbyn Swan
Railroaded: The Transcontinentals and the Making of Modern America by Richard White

Biography or Autobiography
George F. Kennan: An American Life by John Lewis Gaddis
Love and Capital: Karl and Jenny Marx and the Birth of a Revolution by Mary Gabriel
Malcolm X: A Life of Reinvention by Manning Marable

Poetry
Life on Mars by Tracy K. Smith
Core Samples from the World by Forrest Gander
How Long by Ron Padgett

General Nonfiction
The Swerve: How the World Became Modern by Stephen Greenblatt
One Hundred Names for Love: A Stroke, a Marriage, and the Language of Healing by Diane Ackerman
Unnatural Selection: Choosing Boys over Girls, and the Consequences of a World Full of Men by Mara Hvistendahl

=== Music ===
Pulitzer Prize for Music
Silent Night: Opera in Two Acts by Kevin Puts
Death and the Powers by Tod Machover
The Companion Guide to Rome by Andrew Norman

=== Special Citation ===
Not awarded in 2012.

== Board ==
The Pulitzer Prizes Board 2011–2012:

1. Danielle Allen, UPS Foundation Professor, School of Social Science, Institute for Advanced Study, Princeton, N.J.
2. Jim Amoss, editor, The Times-Picayune, New Orleans, La. (Co-chair)
3. Randell Beck, president and publisher, Argus Leader Media, Sioux Falls, S.D.
4. Robert Blau, managing editor for projects and investigations, Bloomberg News, New York, N.Y.
5. Lee Bollinger, president, Columbia University, New York, N.Y.
6. Kathleen Carroll, executive editor and senior vice president, Associated Press (Co-chair)
7. Joyce Dehli, vice president for news, Lee Enterprises
8. Junot Díaz, author and Rudge and Nancy Allen Professor of Writing, Massachusetts Institute of Technology
9. Thomas Friedman, columnist, The New York Times, New York, N.Y.
10. Paul Gigot, editorial page editor, The Wall Street Journal, New York, N.Y.
11. Sig Gissler, administrator, Columbia University Graduate School of Journalism, New York, N.Y.
12. Steven Hahn, Roy F. and Jeanette P. Nichols Professor of History, University of Pennsylvania, Philadelphia
13. Nicholas Lemann, dean, Columbia University Graduate School of Journalism, New York, N.Y.
14. Ann Marie Lipinski, curator, Nieman Foundation for Journalism, Harvard University, Cambridge, Mass. (Co-chair)
15. Gregory Moore, editor, The Denver Post, Denver, Colo.
16. Eugene Robinson, columnist and associate editor, The Washington Post
17. Margaret Sullivan, editor, The Buffalo News, Buffalo, N.Y.
18. Paul Tash, chairman and CEO, Tampa Bay Times, St. Petersburg, Fla.
19. Jim VandeHei, executive editor and co-founder, Politico
20. Keven Ann Willey, vice president and editorial page editor, The Dallas Morning News
