= 1968 Pulitzer Prize =

Awards for journalism and related fields

The Pulitzer Prizes for 1968 are:

== Journalism awards ==
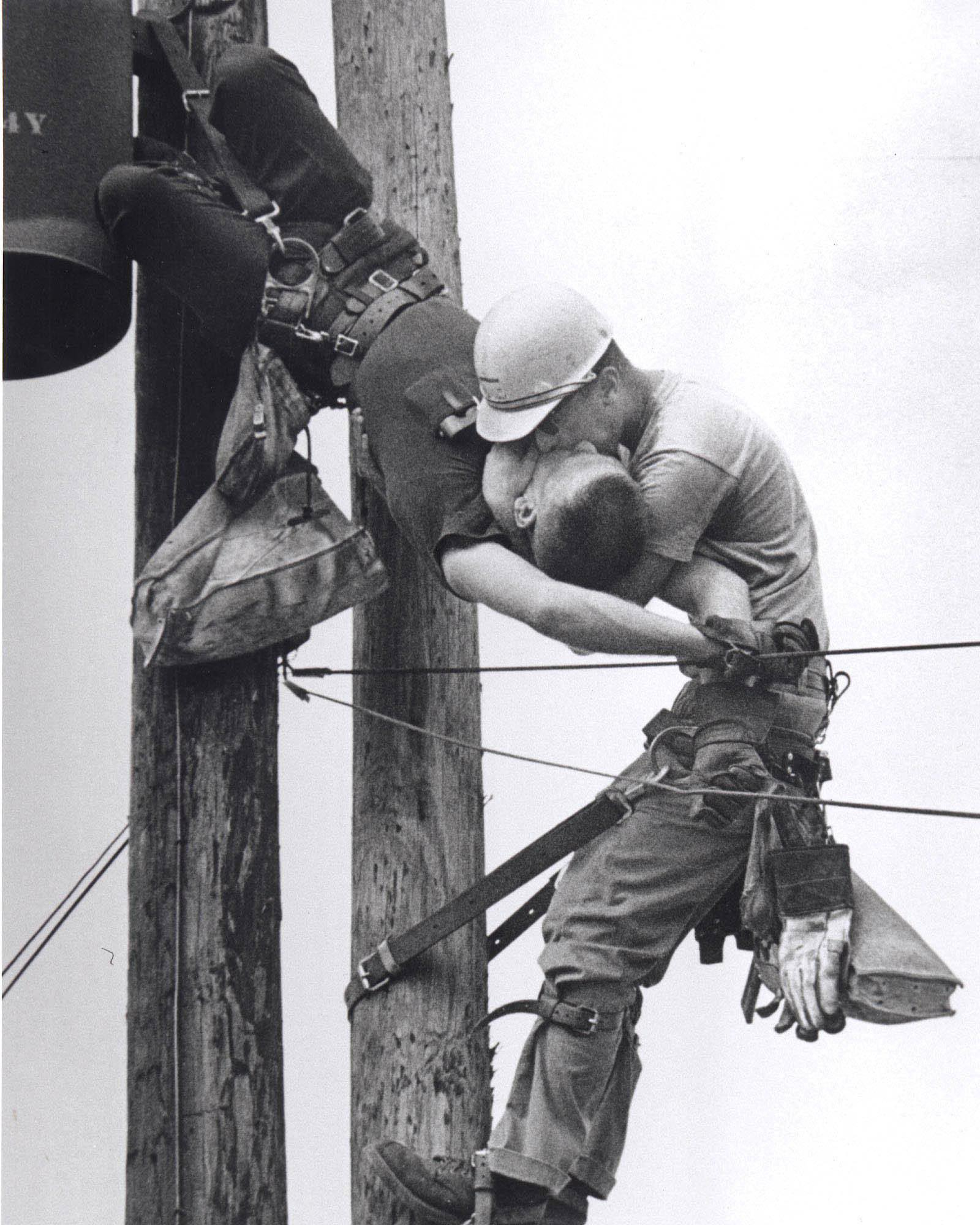
"Kiss of Life", the winning spot news photograph

"Dreams of Better Times", the winning feature photograph

- Public Service:
  - The Riverside Press-Enterprise, for its exposé of corruption in the courts in connection with the handling of the property and estates of the Agua Caliente Band of Cahuilla Indians in Palm Springs, California, and its successful efforts to punish the culprits.
- Local General or Spot News Reporting:
  - The Detroit Free Press staff, for its coverage of the Detroit riots of 1967, recognizing both the brilliance of its detailed spot news staff work and its swift and accurate investigation into the underlying causes of the tragedy.
- Local Investigative Specialized reporting:
  - J. Anthony Lukas of The New York Times, for the social document he wrote in his investigation of the life and the murder of Linda Fitzpatrick.
- National Reporting:
  - Nathan K. Kotz of the Des Moines Register and Minneapolis Tribune, for his reporting of unsanitary conditions in many meat packing plants, which helped insure the passage of the federal Wholesome Meat Act of 1967.
  - Howard James of The Christian Science Monitor, for his series of articles, "Crisis in the Courts".
- International Reporting:
  - Alfred Friendly of The Washington Post, for his coverage of the Middle East War of 1967.
- Editorial Writing:
  - John S. Knight of Knight Newspapers, for his distinguished editorial writing.
- Editorial Cartooning:
  - Eugene Gray Payne of The Charlotte Observer, for his editorial cartooning in 1967.
- Spot News Photography:
  - Rocco Morabito of the Jacksonville Journal, for his photograph, "The Kiss of Life".
- Feature Photography:
  - Toshio Sakai of United Press International, for his Vietnam War combat photograph, "Dreams of Better Times".

== Letters, Drama and Music Awards ==
- Fiction:
  - The Confessions of Nat Turner by William Styron (Random).
- Drama:
  - No award given.
- History:
  - The Ideological Origins of the American Revolution by Bernard Bailyn (Harvard Univ. Press).
- Biography or Autobiography:
  - Memoirs by George F. Kennan (Little).
- Poetry:
  - The Hard Hours by Anthony Hecht (Atheneum).
- General Nonfiction:
  - Rousseau And Revolution, The Tenth And Concluding Volume Of The Story Of Civilization by Will Durant and Ariel Durant (Simon & Schuster).
- Music:
  - Echoes of Time and the River by George Crumb (Belwin-Mills).
    An orchestral suite first performed on May 26, 1967, by the Chicago Symphony Orchestra at Mandel Hall, University of Chicago, having been commissioned by the university in connection with the celebration of its 75th anniversary.
