= Damon Winter =

American journalist

- Born: December 24, 1974 (age 51); Elmira, New York, U.S.
- Education: Columbia University
- Occupation: Photographer
- Awards: Pulitzer Prize for Feature Photography (2009)

Damon Winter (born December 24, 1974) is a New York based photographer who specializes in documentary, editorial, and travel photography. He received a Pulitzer Prize for feature photography in 2009 while with The New York Times.

== Life ==
Born on December 24, 1974, in Elmira, New York, Winter grew up in St. Thomas in the United States Virgin Islands. He earned a bachelor's degree in environmental science from Columbia University and worked for The Dallas Morning News, Newsweek, Magnum Photos, The Ventura County Star and The Indianapolis Star. Winter joined The New York Times in 2007 after three years as a staff photographer at the Los Angeles Times. He lives in Brooklyn.

== Awards ==
Winter's photo essay on sexual abuse victims in western Alaska was a finalist for the 2005 Pulitzer Prize for feature photography. In 2009 he received the Pulitzer Prize for feature photography, for his coverage of Barack Obama's 2008 presidential campaign.

== See also ==
- 2009 Pulitzer Prize
