= Tugnoli =

Tugnoli is an Italian surname. Notable people with the surname include:

- Armando Tugnoli (born 1894), Italian Olympic weightlifter
- Giuseppe Tugnoli (1888–1968), Italian discus thrower, javelin thrower, and shot putter
- Lorenzo Tugnoli (born 1979), Italian photojournalist
