= Grossfeld =

Grossfeld is a surname. Notable people with the surname include:

- Abie Grossfeld (born 1934), American gymnast and coach
- Muriel Grossfeld (1940–2021), American gymnast
- Norman J. Grossfeld (born 1963), American television producer
- Stan Grossfeld (born 1951), American photographer, writer and editor
