= The Ooze (website) =

The Ooze was a Christian website. The site was self-designed and maintained by Christian author and former pastor at the 10,000-member Mariner's Church, Spencer Burke, who launched the magazine from his garage.

Ooze writers reflected changes in global church culture, offering commentary and critique. This earned the site a controversial reputation amongst Christian leaders and extensive news coverage, including reports by the Toledo Blade, Miami Herald, the Los Angeles Times, Christian Science Monitor, the South Florida Sun Sentinel and the Seattle Post Intelligencer

== Related books ==
- A Heretics Guide to Eternity by Spencer Burke
- Out of the Ooze: Unlikely Love Letters to the Church from Beyond the Pew by Spencer and a number of contributing authors, including Alan Hartung, Bob Hyatt, Sarah Raymond Cunningham, Andrew Jones, John O'Keefe and Lisa Delay.
