= 2005 Pulitzer Prize =

Awards for journalism and related fields

The Pulitzer Prizes for 2005 were announced on April 4, 2005:

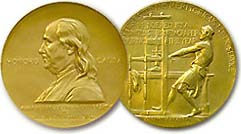
The gold medal awarded for Public Service in Journalism

== Journalism ==
- Beat reporting: Amy Dockser Marcus of The Wall Street Journal for her "stories about patients, families and physicians [of the] world of cancer survivors".
- Breaking news photography: Associated Press staff Murad Sezer, Khalid Mohammed
- Breaking news reporting: Staff of The Star-Ledger, Newark, New Jersey, for "coverage of the resignation of New Jersey's governor after he announced he was gay and confessed to adultery with a male lover".
- Commentary: Connie Schultz of The Plain Dealer, Cleveland
- Criticism: Joe Morgenstern of The Wall Street Journal
- Explanatory reporting: Gareth Cook of The Boston Globe for explaining "the complex scientific and ethical dimensions of stem cell research".
- Editorial cartooning: Nick Anderson of The Courier-Journal, Louisville, Ky.
- Editorial writing: Tom Philp of The Sacramento Bee
- Feature photography: Deanne Fitzmaurice of the San Francisco Chronicle
- Feature writing: Julia Keller of the Chicago Tribune for her "account of a deadly 10-second tornado that ripped through Utica, Illinois".
- International reporting:
  - Kim Murphy of the Los Angeles Times for her "coverage of Russia's struggle to cope with terrorism, improve the economy and make democracy work".
  - Dele Olojede of Newsday, Long Island, New York, for his look at Rwanda 10 years after the Rwandan genocide.
- Investigative reporting: Nigel Jaquiss of Willamette Week, Portland, Oregon, "for his investigation exposing a former governor's long concealed sexual misconduct with a 14-year-old girl".
- National reporting: Walt Bogdanich of The New York Times for his "stories about the corporate cover-up of responsibility for fatal accidents at railway crossings".
- Public service: Los Angeles Times, for "exposing deadly medical problems and racial injustice at a major public hospital".

== Letters and drama ==
- Biography or Autobiography
  - de Kooning: An American Master by Mark Stevens and Annalyn Swan (Alfred A. Knopf)
- Drama
  - Doubt, a parable by John Patrick Shanley (TCG)
- Fiction
  - Gilead by Marilynne Robinson (Farrar)
- General Nonfiction
  - Ghost Wars by Steve Coll (The Penguin Press)
- History
  - Washington's Crossing by David Hackett Fischer (Oxford University Press)
- Music
  - Second Concerto for Orchestra by Steven Stucky (Theodore Presser Company)
- Poetry
  - Delights & Shadows by Ted Kooser (Copper Canyon Press)
