= Mukhtar Khan =

Indian Pulitzer Prize photographer

- Born: Jammu and Kashmir, India
- Occupation: Photojournalism
- Employer: Associated Press
- Awards: Pulitzer Prize

Mukhtar Khan is an Indian photographer and journalist. He was one of three photojournalists from Associated Press to win the Pulitzer Prize for Feature Photography in 2020 for his pictures of India's crackdown on Kashmir.

== Works ==
He has extensively covered the conflict on Kashmir conflict, the Earthquake in South Asia He is working at Associated Press from 2000.

== Awards ==
He Won Atlanta Photojournalism Award in 2015. In 2020, Mukhtar Khan, Dar Yasin and Channi Anand won the 2020 Pulitzer Prize in feature photography.
