= Jay Mather =

- Born: April 22, 1946; Denver, Colorado
- Occupation: Photojournalist

Jay Mather is a Pulitzer Prize awarded photojournalist who worked for Courier-Journal and for Yosemite Association.

== Biography ==
Jay Mather started his career in photojournalism in 1969–1970 while he was volunteering for the United States Peace Corps in Malaysia. In 1979, he got the position of a photojournalist in the Courier-Journal. A year later, he won the Pulitzer Prize for International Reporting for his collaboration with journalist Joel Brinkley covering the waning period of the Khmer Rouge in Cambodia. In 1981, Mather received a Robert F. Kennedy Award for his photo essay "She Ain't Stopping Now” about the disadvantaged. During his work, he covered official visits of Mother Teresa, Pope John Paul II, and USA president Bill Clinton.

The photographer joined the Sacramento Bee in 1986. Two years later, he moved to California to focus on a landscape photography. He published the book "Yosemite, Landscape of Life" in collaboration with the Yosemite Association in 1990. A year after, he was nominated for the Pulitzer Prize for Feature Photography for his “series of photographs depicting Yosemite National Park and its visitors during the park's centennial year”.

In 2009, Mather and journalist Joel Brinkley began working on the book Cambodia's Curse: The Modern History of a Troubled Land. They visited Cambodia again to capture the current state of the country. Beside that photojournalists' essays from Cambodia were exhibited at the University of Louisville and the Portland Museum.

== Books ==
- Saur, K. G. (2011). International Reporting 1928-1985: From the Activities of the League of Nations to present-day Global Problems. Vienna: De Gruyter. p. 437. ISBN 978-3598301711.
