= David C. Peterson =

American photographer and journalist

- Born: David Charles Peterson; October 22, 1949 (age 76); Kansas
- Education: Bachelor of Science in Education, Kansas State University,1971. Bachelor of Science in Journalism, University of Kansas, 1974.
- Spouse: Julie Peterson
- Parents: John Edward Peterson (father); Florence Athene (Hobbs) (mother)
- Awards: Pulitzer Prize for Feature Photography; 1987 Farm Crisis; Pulitzer Prize for Community Service (1991)

David Charles Peterson is an American photographer and journalist, winner of the Pulitzer Prize for Feature Photography in 1987. Peterson also shared the Pulitzer Prize in 1991 for Community Service with two other staff members of the Des Moines Register. David Charles Peterson was born on October 22, 1949, to John Edward Peterson and Florence Athene, in Kansas. In 1971 he graduated with a Bachelor of Science in Education from the Kansas State University. Three years later he received a Bachelor of Science in Journalism from the University of Kansas. In 1975 he became the staff photographer at the Topeka Capital-Journal, after two years he switched to the Des Moines Register.

In 1986 Peterson took a sabbatical and split it into three parts, a month per season, to cover the growing cycle and work on the "Farm Crisis", the stories of Iowa farm families in the middle of a six-year-long crisis. The chronicle depicted the tragedy of a family forced to sell their land, a deserted town, and a woman, visiting her husband's grave after his suicide. In 1986 he was awarded the National Press Photographers Association Prize. In 1987 Peterson was chosen by jurors of the Pulitzer Prize for Feature Photography for ‘depicting the shattered dreams of American farmers’. He also received the Regional Photographer of the Year Award in 1979–81.

Married to Julie Ann Peterson, has three children Brian, Scott and Anna

== Literature ==
- Brennan, Elizabeth A.; Clarage, Elizabeth C. (1999). Who's who of Pulitzer Prize Winners. Phoenix: Oryx Press. p. 211. ISBN 1-57356-111-8.
- Fischer, Heinz-Dietrich (2011). Picture Coverage of the World: Pulitzer Prize Winning Photos. Transaction Publishers. pp. 140–142. ISBN 978-3-643-10844-9.
- Fischer, Heinz-Dietrich (2015). Key Images of American Life: Pulitzer Prize Winning Pictures. Zurich: LIT. p. 148. ISBN 978-3-643-90518-5.
