= Renée C. Byer =

American photojournalist (born 1958)

Renée C. Byer (1958) was born in Yonkers, New York.

Since 2003, she has served as the senior photojournalist at The Sacramento Bee.

In 2007, Byer won a Pulitzer Prize for her photo essay "A Mother's Journey".

Byer was also a Pulitzer Prize finalist in 2013, "For her heartwarming photographs of a grandfather raising three grandchildren after the violent death of his daughter and the loss of his wife to cancer."

== Early life ==
Byer was first introduced to photography by her father, who had a dark room in their apartment in the Bronx. She was given her first camera, a Brownie Starmite II Kodak, by her mother for her 8th birthday, and went on to study photography in high school and took the pictures for the school yearbook. She went to Ulster County Community College to study art and humanities, before transferring to Bradley University in Peoria, Illinois, where she majored in art and mass communications.

== Career ==
Byer worked for different newspapers before starting at the Sacramento Bee as a documentary photojournalist.

=== A Mother's Journey ===
"A Mother's Journey", her photo series which won her the Pulitzer Prize for Feature Photography in 2007 was shot over the course of a year, about the relationship between a mother, Cyndie French, and her 11 years old son Derek who was battling neuroblastoma, a type of cancer.

=== Living on a Dollar a Day ===
Byers worked for four years on a photography project called "Living on a Dollar a Day". She collaborated with Thomas A. Nazario to write the book Living on a Dollar a Day: The Lives and Faces of the World’s Poor released in April 2014. They travelled to ten countries on four continents for the San Francisco-based nonprofit The Forgotten International detailing the lives of people around the world living in extreme poverty. The book won First Place Documentary Book from the International Photography Awards in 2014. A documentary about the project was released in 2016 narrated by Byer herself.

The Dalai Lama wrote a foreword for the book where he states, “Living on a Dollar a Day shows images of women, children and families in our global community who suffer every day from the effects of extreme poverty. Their stories tell us that they have the same hopes and dreams for themselves and for their children as anyone else in the world.”

== Non-Profit ==
In 2017 Byer started a non-profit named “Positive Change Can Happen” which works to end extreme poverty by 2030.

== Personal life ==
Byer is married to fellow Sacramento Bee photographer Paul Kitagaki, Jr. She is of Irish descent through her mother's grandfather who came from County Galway, Ireland.

== Awards ==
- 2021, “Homeless Struggle” was the Feature Photo at the NPPA Best of Photojournalism
- 2018-19, “When Paradise became Hell: The Story of the Camp Fire” was Emmy-nominated for Outstanding Achievement Documentary -Topical as Videographer
- 2017 The White House News Photographers Association Multimedia documentary award in the annual ‘Eyes of History’ competition, "No Safe Place." 1st Place"
- 2016 EPPY for Best Photojournalism
- 2016 Inland Press Association, 1st Place News Picture Photography - Picture Story Renée C. Byer, The Sacramento Bee, "No Safe Place."
- 2016 Inland Press Association, 1st Place Creative Use of Multimedia, "No Safe Place"
- 2016 SPJNORCAL, 1st Place Community Journalism (Print/Online), "No Safe Place"
- 2016 SPJNORCAL, 1st Place Photojournalism (Photo Essay), "No Safe Place"
- 2015 Best of Photojournalism, Nature and Environmental Picture Story, National Press Photographers Association, First Place
- 2015 World Understanding Award, Pictures of the Year International, Finalist
- 2015 Scripps Howard Photojournalism Award, Finalist
- 2015 LensCulture Earth Awards, Documentary Series on electronic waste, Second Place
- 2013 Pulitzer Prize, Feature Photography, The Sacramento Bee, Finalist
- 2007 Pulitzer Prize, Feature Photography, “A Mother’s Journey,” The Sacramento Bee, Winner
- 2007 World Understanding Award, Pictures of the Year International, Winner
- 2007 Multimedia Feature Picture Story, Pictures of the Year International
- 2007 Days Japan International Photojournalism Award, Second Place
- 2007 Casey Medal for Meritorious Journalism, Winner
- 2007 Photo of the Year Award, The United Nations Children Emergency Fund, Honorable Mention
- 2007 Award of Excellence, Feature Photography, Pictures of the Year International

== Book awards ==
- 2014 IPA Documentary Book Award, Living on a Dollar a Day: The Lives and Faces of the World’s Poor, First Place
- 2014 Moscow International Foto Awards, Documentary Book, Living on a Dollar a Day: The Lives and Faces of the World’s Poor, Honorable Mention

== Solo exhibitions and presentations ==
- 2017 Western Kentucky University MMTH Gallery and Atrium, Bowling Green, Kentucky
- 2016 Global Women Leaders’ Forum: Inspiring the Next Generation of Leaders, Sofia, Bulgaria
- 2016 Month of Photography Los Angeles, California; official exhibition
- 2015 Viewpoint Photographic Art Center, Sacramento, California
- 2014 Visa Pour L’Image Festival of the Photograph, Perpignan, France; video presentation
- 2014 Hartmann Center Art Gallery, Bradley University, Peoria, Illinois
- 2010 Samuel Dorsky Museum of Art, State University of New York, New Paltz
- 2007 Sage Moon Gallery, LOOK3 Festival of the Photograph, Charlottesville, Virginia
- 2007 Hartmann Center Art Gallery, Bradley University, Peoria, Illinois
- 2007 Muroff-Kotler Visual Arts Gallery, State University of New York, Stone Ridge, New York
- 2007 Palm Beach Photographic Centre, Palm Beach, Florida
- 2007 Exposure Gallery, San Francisco, California

== Publications ==
- 2014 Living on a Dollar a Day: The Lives and Faces of the World’s Poor, The Quantuck Press, Thomas Nazario
- 2010 A Mother’s Journey and Selected Photographs, Samuel Dorsky Museum of Art, SUNY, New Paltz

== TV, Film, and Radio ==
- 2014 NBC's Depth of Field with Ann Curry, “Living on a Dollar a Day: Reality of Extreme Poverty Revealed,” interview
- 2014 ABC's Real Biz with Bob Woodruff and Rebecca Jarvis, “'Living on a Dollar a Day' - Shocking Photos from Around the World,” interview
- 2014 NBC's Depth of Field with Ann Curry, “Love and Loss - A Family's Struggle with Childhood Cancer,” interview
- 2014 The Photography Channel, “Renée C. Byer - A Mother's Journey,” interview
