= Danny Hakim =

American journalist

Danny Hakim (born March 10, 1971) is an investigative reporter for The New York Times. Hakim shared a Pulitzer Prize in 2009 as one of the lead reporters on a team that covered the Eliot Spitzer prostitution scandal.

== Early life and education ==
Hakim was born in Virginia Beach, Virginia, and grew up in Norfolk, Virginia. During high school he became bored with traditional education. He learned about St. John's College from his mother, a writer. St. John's has a less traditional approach, emphasizing discussion based learning and the study of great books. He majored in philosophy, had no early interest in writing and briefly attended art school after his 1993 graduation. His first job in writing was as a copy aide at the Washington Post.

== Career ==
His first reporting job was as a police reporter for the Greenville News in South Carolina. He then worked as a financial reporter for SmartMoney before joining The New York Times in 2000.

His first assignment at the Times was as bureau chief in Detroit. This was followed by a stint as Albany, New York bureau chief. Hakim covered four New York governors during his posting in Albany. He uncovered scandals involving two of them that led to one resigning and one withdrawing from the 2010 governor's race.

On March 10, 2008, he broke the story that New York Eliot Spitzer had been "caught on a federal wiretap arranging to meet with a high-priced prostitute at a Washington hotel." Spitzer was identified as "Client 9," met with a prostitute from the online international prostitution ring Emperors Club VIP. He tried to resist calls for his resignation, but could not do so, and resigned on March 12, 2008, two days after Hakim's story. His successor was, also, scrutinized by Hakim. Hakim was part of a team of reporters who broke the news that Governor David Paterson had abused his power as governor to try to squash an abuse case. Within days of the article, Paterson ended his campaign for governor.

In 2012 Hakim was a finalist for a Pulitzer Prize in 2012 for co-authoring a series on the abuse and neglect of the developmentally disabled in New York State nursing homes. The articles identified over 1200 unexplained deaths over the previous decade, and led to the removal of top level administrators, the firing of 130 employees and the passage of laws protecting the disabled.

In 2012 he moved to London to become the Times European economic correspondent.

In 2016 Hakim published an investigative report on genetically modified crops and pesticides. He reported that genetically modified crops have not accelerated increases in crop yields or cut down the use of pesticides. Industry response was rapid and was virulently negative toward the article. His claims were described as false and recycled, and as "wrong in about every way they could be." Another response accused him of using distorted facts and "lying."

In 2023 he has been reporting on the 2020 Georgia election investigation.

== Personal life ==
He is married with two children and lives in Saratoga Springs, New York.
