= Matthew Lewis (photographer) =

American photographer (1930–2024)

- Born: March 8, 1930; McDonald, Pennsylvania, U.S.
- Died: October 2, 2024 (aged 94)
- Education: Howard University; University of Pittsburgh
- Occupation: Photojournalist
- Awards: Pulitzer Prize for Feature Photography (1975)

Matthew Lewis (March 8, 1930 – October 2, 2024) was an American photojournalist who won a Pulitzer Prize for his 1975 work with The Washington Post.

== Life and career ==
Lewis was born in McDonald, Pennsylvania, on March 8, 1930. He later moved to Washington, D.C. in 1947. He attended college at Howard University in 1947 for a year and then continued at the University of Pittsburgh the next year before he dropped out. From 1949 to 1952, Lewis served as a hospital corpsman for the United States Navy. Lewis received his first job at Morgan State University where he worked in the audio visual department. Lewis freelanced for the Baltimore Afro-American before getting a job with The Washington Post in 1965 as a staff photographer. He was eventually promoted to assistant managing editor of photography where he covered Civil Rights marches, Super Bowls, and John F. Kennedy's funeral. He was the first African-American photographer to work for The Washington Post.

Lewis retired in 1990, and moved with his wife Jeannine to Thomasville, North Carolina. He began working at the Thomasville Times in 1990 to keep himself occupied.

Lewis died on October 2, 2024, at the age of 94.

== Awards ==
In 1975, Lewis was awarded the Pulitzer Prize for Feature Photography "for his photographs in color and black and white." These photos portrayed various aspects of "the Washington lifestyle." Lewis won first place in the White House News Photographers Association competitions in 1968 and 1971 In 2010, the International Civil Rights Center & Museum honored Lewis during a special tribute and public reception.
