= Thomas Nazario =

American lawyer

Thomas A. Nazario
- Born: Thomas Albert Nazario; May 15, 1949 (age 77); New York City, New York, U.S.
- Education: City College of New York (B.A.) and (M.A); John Jay College of Criminal Justice (B.S.); University of San Francisco School of Law (J.D.)
- Occupations: Founder, The Forgotten International; Law Professor

Thomas Albert Nazario (born May 15, 1949) is an American lawyer, author and international children's rights advocate. He is an assistant professor at the University of San Francisco School of Law, as well as founder and president of the San Francisco-based The Forgotten International, and previously program director of University of San Francisco's Tibetan Children Education Project. He has been an inspector for the United Nations and a consultant for the National Association for the Advancement of Colored People and the Mexican American Legal Defense and Educational Fund. He has authored four books on children's rights, including In Defense of Children.

Nazario has worked around the world documenting human rights violations involving women and children for the United Nations, the U.S. State Department, and for many nongovernmental agencies. In 2014 he published a book addressing issues of global poverty, Living on a Dollar a Day: The Lives and Faces of the World's Poor.

== Biography ==
Born in 1949, Nazario grew up in a middle class suburb of Queens, New York City. He earned his B.S. from John Jay College of Criminal Justice in 1971 and his B.A. and M.A. from City College of New York in 1972. After graduating from the University of San Francisco School of Law in 1975 with his J.D. he served as assistant deputy public defender in San Francisco, and worked as a children's rights advocate. He received a fellowship from the Robert F. Kennedy Memorial to start the Bay Area Street Law Project. He later joined the staff of the University of San Francisco School of Law as a law professor where his focus has been Children's Rights, Education Law, and Family Law.

As part of a National Children's Day observance resulting from a resolution offered by Joseph P. Kennedy II and passed by the U.S. House of Representatives, Nazario served as a member of a task force responsible for monitoring the status of children in America and testified before Congress on the problems they face. Additionally, Nazario has drafted legislation that would ban the corporal punishment of children in California.

In acknowledgment of his work, Nazario was named the 1997 Harvard Educator of the Year by the Harvard Club of San Francisco, and in 1998 received the Sarlo prize from the University of San Francisco, the university’s most prestigious award given annually to the professor who has exhibited excellence in teaching and in his or her commitment to students and the community.

Nazario has authored four books on children’s rights including the nationally acclaimed, In Defense of Children. He has appeared on CNN, Oprah Winfrey, Larry King, the Today Show, and the Tom Snyder Show, as well as dozens of other programs, while, at the same time, serving as a consultant to law firms throughout the country litigating cases involving children who have been abused or neglected, the subject of an intense custody battle, lost in foster care, or injured or killed as a result of someone’s negligence.

He founded an international philanthropic organization, The Forgotten International, in 2007, whose mission is to develop programs that alleviate poverty and suffering associated with poverty in both the United States and worldwide, in particular, that experienced by women and children. Since its inception, the foundation has raised hundreds of thousands of dollars to help fund programs in nine countries and continues to expand.

== Teaching ==
In addition to teaching and writing at the University of San Francisco, he is the executive director of the school's Center for Community Legal Education, as well as program director of University of San Francisco's Tibetan Children Education Project, and supervises the Street Law Program which sends students to inner-city schools to serve as teachers and role models.

Beyond his work at the University of San Francisco, Nazario has also taught a course on the Constitution and the Family at the East China University of Politics and Law in Shanghai, China, and courses at Trinity College in Ireland, Pazmany Peter Catholic University in Budapest, Hungary, and at Charles University in the Czech Republic, on International Rights Law and how such law relates to the rights of children worldwide

== Work for the United Nations and the U.S. State Department ==
In 1999, Nazario traveled to Dharamshala, India as part of a team of attorneys and psychologists sent by the United Nations Committee on the Rights of the Child to interview Tibetan children who escaped Tibet and went to India as refugees. The report, A Generation in Peril, The Lives of Tibetan Children under Chinese Rule, documented human rights abuses by the Chinese government against Tibetan children and their families as well as the children's lives after arriving in India. The report was presented to the UN on June 6, 2005.

As a result of his work on this report, Nazario has returned to India on more than eight occasions, and has brought students from his university to work with refugee children, developed a scholarship program for Tibetan students, and coordinated a visit by the Dalai Lama to the University of San Francisco in September 2003. The Dalai Lama came to University of San Francisco specifically to receive an Honorary Doctoral Degree and to thank the university for the work Nazario has spearheaded on the university’s behalf. Since then, Nazario has continued to work with the Dalai Lama on various visits to the United States as well as projects related to the care and protection of the Tibetan people.

Nazario has since worked as an Inspector for the UN and other agencies documenting human rights violations involving women and children. In this capacity Nazario has also visited children orphaned by AIDS in Botswana, children sold in sexual slavery in the brothels of Thailand, and children living in sewers in Romania As a Senior Trainer for the U.S. State Department, he has conducted workshops around the world designed to train officials within police agencies to work more humanely with the public.

== Living on a Dollar a Day ==
In 2014 Nazario partnered with Pulitzer Prize-winning photojournalist Renée C. Byer to produce the book, Living on a Dollar a Day: The Lives and Faces of the World's Poor, detailing the lives of women, children, and families around the world living in extreme poverty. While Jim Colton, editor of zPhotoJournal, calls it, "one of the most important books published this century," the narratives and imagery have been connected to debate about the effectiveness of philanthropy in eradicating poverty

After the book was published, the video footage collected over the course of their travels inspired the creation of the award-winning documentary, "Living on a Dollar a Day", now available to stream on platforms including Amazon Prime.

== Books ==
Nazario, Thomas A. & Quayle, Kelly (2017). Doing Good: Inspiring Activities and Ideas for Young People to Make the World a Better Place. Rowman & Littlefield. ISBN 978-1-4758-3246-4 (Forthcoming February 2017)

Nazario, Thomas A. & Byer, Renée C. (2014). Living on a Dollar a Day: The Lives and Faces of the World's Poor. Quantuck Lane Press. ISBN 978-1593720568

Nazario, Thomas A. & Scarpello, Christine (1997). California Supplement to Street Law: a Course in Practical Law, 5th ed. West Pub. Co.

Nazario, Thomas A., Kids and the Law: an A-to-Z Guide for Parents (1996). [San Francisco, Calif.]: State Bar of California ("A community service of the State Bar of California." Developed and distributed with the support of the California Congress of Parents, Teachers, and Students, Inc.

Nazario, Thomas A. & Jannke, Samantha, ed. (1995). Teenage Pregnancy, Single Parents and the Law: a Legal Guide for Those Who Work with California'sYouth: the Answers to Questions Most Often Asked. Sacramento, California: California Alliance Concerned with School Age Parents.

Nazario, Thomas A., ed. (1995). A Curriculum and Program Guide for Teens on Law. The Clarence E. Heller Charitable Foundation, San Francisco, California.

Nazario, Thomas A. with Blum, Pamela, Hirschfeld, Steven & Miljanich, Patricia Henderson (1988). In Defense of Children: Understanding the Rights, Needs, and Interests of the Child: a Resource for Parents and Professionals. New York: Charles Scribner's Sons.

Nazario, Thomas A., O'Brien, Edward L., & Arbetman, Lee (1990). Street Law: a Course in Practical Law, 4th ed. St. Paul: West-Pub. Co. (with California state supplement prepared by Thomas A. Nazario.)

Nazario, Thomas A., O'Brien, Edward L., McMahon, Edward & Arbetman, Lee (1987). Street Law: a Course in Practical Law, 3rd ed. St. Paul: West Pub. Co. (with California state supplement prepared by Thomas A. Nazario.

Nazario, Thomas A., O'Brien, Edward L., & Arbetman, Lee (1984). Street Law: a Course in Practical Law, 2nd ed. St. Paul: West Pub. Co. ("A publication of the National Institute for Citizen Education in the Law." "California state supplement prepared by Thomas A. Nazario.")

== Articles ==
Nazario, Thomas A., "When Your Ex Won't Pay." Volume 66, Issue 3, Parents Magazine, 63 (1991)

Nazario, Thomas A., "What teachers, parents, and kids should know about drinking and drugs. " (Youth at Risk) 12 Update on Law-Related Education 4 (1988)

Nazario, Thomas A., "What do we know about delinquency?" 12 Update on Law-Related Education 8 (1988)

Nazario, Thomas A., Ackerley, Sally, Benford, Elizabeth & C. White, ed., "Law Related Externships for High School Students." 192 Building Bridges to the Law 203, American Bar Association (1981)
