= Jessica Rinaldi =

Jessica Rinaldi is a Pulitzer Prize winning photojournalist from the Boston Globe. She was awarded the 2016 Pulitzer Prize in Feature Photography for her photographic story of a child living after abuse.

== Early career ==
Rinaldi graduated from Boston University in 2001 with a B.S. in Journalism. For ten years she was a contract photographer for Reuters, winning multiple awards.

== Pulitzer prize ==
Rinaldi's Pulitzer-winning submission was a photo-documentary of a seven-year-old named Strider Wolf. At two years old, Wolf was severely beaten by his parents, and underwent surgery for his damaged organs; the scar of which is visible in Rinaldi's work. The photos document Wolf living with his grandparents in rural Maine. When the story initially ran, a GoFundMe campaign was started, raising nearly $20,000 for Wolf and his caretakers. Rinaldi's other submission was a finalist for chronicling the life of a mother addicted to heroin and her young daughters in East Boston.
