= Dar Yasin =

Indian journalist

- Born: 1973 (age 52–53); Jammu and Kashmir, India
- Occupation: Photojournalism
- Employer: Associated Press
- Awards: Pulitzer Prize

Dar Yasin is an Indian photographer and journalist. He was one of three photojournalists from Associated Press to win the Pulitzer Prize for Feature Photography in 2020 for his pictures of India's crackdown on Kashmir.

== Early life and education ==
Dar was born in 1973 in Kashmir. He Studied computer science and technology baccalaureate from South India. He lives in Srinagar.

== Works ==
Dar has extensively covered the conflict on Kashmir conflict, the Earthquake in South Asia and its aftermath, and the landmark opening of the bus route between divided Kashmir. He has also covered Afghan War, Afghan Refugees & the Rohingya refugee crisis. He is now working at Associated Press.

== Awards ==
He won in several contests such as, NPPA's Best of Photojournalism, POYi and Atlanta Photojournalism Seminar. He received Ramnath Goenka Excellence in Journalism Awards, National Headliner Awards, and Sigma Delta Chi Award. He was a part of AP team which has won Hal Boyle Award & Robert F. Kennedy Award for Rohingya crisis coverage. He also won 2019 Yannis Behrakis International Photojournalism Award.

In 2020, Dar Yasin, Mukhtar Khan and Channi Anand won the 2020 Pulitzer Prize in feature photography for their India's crackdown on Kashmir photos.
