= Toledo Free Press =

Newspaper in Ohio, United States

- Type: Weekly newspaper
- Format: Tabloid
- Founded: 2005
- Ceased publication: 2015
- Website: ToledoFreePress.com

The Toledo Free Press was a weekly newspaper which was published from 2005 to 2015 in Toledo, Ohio. It was relaunched in 2024 as an online-only publication at the same Web address.

== History ==
It was founded in March 2005 by Thomas Pounds, a veteran administrator of daily newspapers in Toledo and Pittsburgh, Pennsylvania. On March 10, 2010, the paper added a Wednesday edition called the Toledo Free Press STAR, that was only available on newsstands throughout Northwest Ohio. The second edition focuses "on local arts and sports with a comprehensive calendar of events." https://toledofreepress.com/tfp_returns/The paper published a blend investigative journalism, commentary, and local news and features in a tabloid format, concentrating on covering news often missed by the other periodicals in the area.

In May 2010, Toledo Free Press started offering digital "e-PRESS" versions of both editions of its paper via Issuu. More than 450 editions have been uploaded, with impressions totaling more than 800,000.

In December 2006, the paper announced it was moving its distribution day from Wednesday to Sunday. From its initial circulation of 30,000, the paper grew to a circulation of more than 100,000 in its heyday and declined to a 2014 circulation of 72,000, with 57,000 free home delivered.

== Closure ==
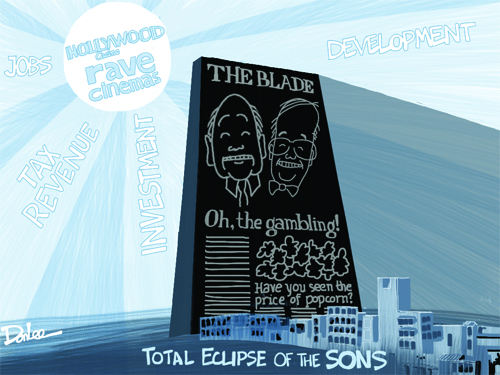
The editorial cartoon that prompted the lawsuit

On April 27, 2015, the paper announced its closure, citing legal troubles and ad pricing. The legal troubles undoubtedly include an ongoing lawsuit from 2011 by The Blade against the Toledo Free Press's publisher, Thomas F. Pounds, citing breach of contract by Mr. Pounds in his "Separation Agreement" with "The Blade" (his former employer). Home-improvement chain Menard Inc. filed a suit in Lucas County Common Pleas Court in April 2015, accusing the weekly newspaper of failing to inform the company of declining circulation or to adjust its billing for advertising services.

The complaint alleges the Free Press "intended to mislead: Menard because it "was paid by the number of print advertisements it circulated."

The newspaper continued to publish to its website and its Facebook page until May 14, 2015.

In 2020, five years after the newspaper ceased publication, a group of volunteers, including former staffers and contributors and led by community activist Sean Nestor, undertook a yearlong project to restore the paper's archives to searchable public accessibility.

In July 2024, the paper relaunched as an online-only publication with Pounds as publisher.
