= Hannah Reyes Morales =

Filipina photographer

Hannah Reyes Morales is a Filipina photographer from Manila, Philippines.

The focus of Morales’ work surrounds resiliency and the bonds between individuals. Interested in how individuals face hardship, often her photographs will document the impoverished and observe the dignity of the poor despite the systemic inequality and injustice that is experienced.

== Early life ==
Born in 1990, Morales was raised in Manila, Philippines with her mother and 12 relatives. In high school, Morales tutored children in poor communities and gained valuable experience during that time. Enrollment in a photography class while attending the University of the Philippines led to an internship at the European Pressphoto Agency and further exploration in photography. It was at the University where Morales was introduced to photography through one of her professors.

== Career ==
Over her career, she has traveled through Asia to document the daily lives of individuals and families within struggling communities. Between 2013 - 2016, she lived in Cambodia where her work included photographing Cambodian bride trades and forced marriages. In 2016 she began photographing the people affected by the Philippine drug war. When she first began photographing the effects, she documented the deaths that were occurring regularly.

Her focus quickly shifted to the stories of the individuals and families in the neighborhoods where the deaths took place. Her themes of resilience within community can also be seen in a variety of projects such as Shelter from the Storm, about women forced into the sex trade industry due to displacement by natural disasters. Additional projects include Roots from Ashes, Eagle Hunters, and Seasons of Darkness.

As her career has progressed Morales's practice has seen an increasing focus on the arts and an evolution beyond journalism. In 2021 she co-founded the Emerging Islands art residency and artist collective based in La Union, Philippines

== Awards and recognitions ==
Morales is the recipient of numerous awards. In 2020, she was awarded the Infinity Award for Documentary Practice and Visual Journalism by the International Center of Photography. She has also received the 2019 Tim Hetherington Visionary Award, The Royal Photographic Society Margaret Harker media for 100 Photographic Heroines, and the 2016 SOPA Award for Excellence in Digital Reporting. In addition, she was previously awarded a grant from the National Geographic Society.

In 2023, Morales was named as one of the regional winners for South East Asia and Oceania in the World Press Photo Awards

Morales, The New York Times contributor, is a 2024 Pulitzer Prize (Pulitzer Prize for Feature Photography) finalist for her NYT article's photos, "How the Youth Boom in Africa Will Change the World." She creatively documented a “youthquake” in Africa.

== Works ==
Morales has worked with numerous newspapers, magazines, and projects. Her work has been shown in The New York Times, The Washington Post, CNN Philippines, and the Atlantic. Additionally, she since working as a National Geographic Explorer since 2017. In 2020, she was named a cultural leader by the World Economic Forum.
