= Allan Detrich =

American photographer

Allan Detrich is an American photographer. He was born in Attica, Ohio, and attended the Ohio Institute of Photography in Dayton, Ohio. In 1998 his photo-essay "Children of the Underground" made it to the finals of the Pulitzer Prize for Feature Photography. In 2002, his photograph of a tornado in Tiffin, Ohio during the Veterans Day weekend outbreak was chosen by Time magazine as one of its "Best Photos of the Year".

Detrich worked at the Toledo Blade from 1989 to 2007. He left the Blade in April 2007 when it was discovered that he had digitally altered a photo that was published on the front page of the March 31, 2007 edition. A subsequent investigation revealed that he had digitally altered and submitted 79 photos during the first 14 weeks of 2007, 58 of which ran either in the Blade or on its website. The National Press Photographers Association (NPPA) referred to Detrich as a "serial digital manipulator of news photographs". Since leaving the Blade he has been working as a freelance photographer and in the motion picture industry.

Since 1998 Detrich has been active as a "storm chaser". He spends several weeks each summer studying and photographing tornadoes in the American Great Plains with other enthusiasts. He is also known as a collector of and an expert on the Diana camera.
