= Channi Anand =

Indian Pulitzer Prize recipients

- Born: 26 October 1970 (age 55); Jammu
- Occupation: Photojournalism
- Employer: Associated Press
- Spouse: Rajni Anand
- Children: Abhay Anand, Aakriti Anand
- Awards: Pulitzer Prize

Channi Anand is an Indian photographer and journalist. He was one of three photojournalists from the Associated Press to win the Pulitzer Prize for Feature Photography in 2020 for his pictures of India's lockdown of Kashmir.

== Works ==
He has covered India-Pakistan border violence, political developments, stories of displacement due to the earthquakes in South Asia. He has worked at Associated Press since 2000. Channi Anand is a resident of Jammu Kashmir.

== Achievement ==
In August 2019, Anand along with two other photojournalists, Dar Yasin and Mukhtar Khan, won the most prestigious photojournalism award, the Pulitzer, for covering the unprecedented situation in Indian-administered Kashmir.
