= Jahi Chikwendiu =

American photojournalist

- Born: Lexington, Kentucky, U.S.
- Education: University of Kentucky (BS, MA)
- Occupation: Photojournalist
- Years active: 1998–present
- Employer: The Washington Post (2001–2025)
- Known for: Tanner's Song
- Awards: Pulitzer Prize for Feature Photography (2026)

Jahi Chikwendiu is an American photojournalist whose work has covered armed conflicts, public health, education, race and other social issues in the United States and abroad. He was a staff photographer at The Washington Post from 2001 to 2025.

In 2026, Chikwendiu won the Pulitzer Prize for Feature Photography for a photo essay documenting a young couple who welcomed their first child while the father was dying from cancer. The project, titled Tanner's Song, also received a 2026 World Press Photo award in the North and Central America Stories category. He had previously won first prize in the Nature Singles category of the 2005 World Press Photo Contest.

== Early life and education ==
Chikwendiu is a native of Lexington, Kentucky. He studied mathematics at the University of Kentucky, earning a bachelor's degree in mathematics and a master's degree in mathematics education. His interest in photography developed while he was a university student, when he began using a still camera to approach people and document their lives.

After completing his education, Chikwendiu taught high-school mathematics for one year. In the autumn of 1998, he became a staff photographer at his hometown newspaper, the Lexington Herald-Leader. Three months after beginning his newspaper career, he was named the 1998 Photographer of the Year by the Kentucky News Photographers Association.

== Career ==
=== The Washington Post ===
Chikwendiu joined The Washington Post in 2001. His assignments for the newspaper included coverage of the District of Columbia Public Schools, the 2003 invasion of Iraq, poverty and the HIV/AIDS epidemic in Kenya, the Darfur genocide, civilian victims of cluster munitions in southern Lebanon, refugees from Iraq and Sudan, and the independence of South Sudan.

The invasion of Iraq was Chikwendiu's first overseas assignment for the newspaper. He entered northern Iraq shortly before the invasion and documented the conflict from the perspective of Iraqi Kurds. He was not embedded with the United States military and entered Iraq on foot after travelling through Iran.

His subsequent international work included reporting from Darfur, where he photographed people displaced by the conflict. A photograph taken in August 2004 showed a sandstorm passing temporary housing used by displaced Sudanese people near the Darfur border. The image won first prize in the Nature Singles category of the 2005 World Press Photo Contest.

Chikwendiu spent the first three months of 2009 working in Africa. His assignments included coverage of Barack Obama's inauguration from the Kenyan village associated with Obama's paternal family, as well as reporting from the Democratic Republic of the Congo, Rwanda, Kenya and South Sudan.

In 2019, Chikwendiu contributed photographs and an essay titled “Chokehold: The dangers of internalizing racism” to The Washington Post Magazine project Visualizing Racism. The project brought together nine photographers to examine personal and institutional forms of racism.

Other subjects photographed by Chikwendiu included the aftermath of the assassination of Benazir Bhutto, religious violence in the southern Philippines, police brutality in the United States, climate change and sea-level rise, maternal health among Black Americans, declining life expectancy in the United States and the effects of climate change on malaria transmission in Mozambique.

Chikwendiu worked for The Washington Post until July 2025, when he left the newspaper after accepting a buyout.

=== Tanner's Song ===
During 2025, Chikwendiu worked with reporter Ariana Eunjung Cha and video journalist Drea Cornejo on a project about rising cancer rates among young adults. Over several months, the journalists documented Tanner and Shay Martin, a couple living in Utah. Tanner Martin had been diagnosed with stage-four colorectal cancer at the age of 25, and the couple were preparing for the birth of their first child while his condition deteriorated.

Chikwendiu's black-and-white photographs followed the family through medical appointments, their home life, the birth of their daughter, Tanner's final weeks and his funeral. Tanner lived for 41 days after the birth of his daughter. The photographs were published by The Washington Post as part of its reporting on cancer among younger Americans.

The series, later titled Tanner's Song, was selected as a North and Central America Stories winner in the 2026 World Press Photo Contest. The jury praised its sensitive treatment of the family and its use of traditional black-and-white documentary photography. Chikwendiu subsequently received the 2026 Pulitzer Prize for Feature Photography for the project.

== Awards and recognition ==
Chikwendiu's selected awards and honors include:

- 1998: Photographer of the Year, Kentucky News Photographers Association
- 2005: First prize, Nature Singles, World Press Photo Contest, for a photograph of a sandstorm near Darfur
- 2017: First place, Picture Story: Feature, White House News Photographers Association's Eyes of History contest
- 2025: Second place, Photojournalist of the Year–National, National Press Photographers Association Best of Photojournalism competition
- 2026: North and Central America Stories winner, World Press Photo Contest, for Tanner's Song
- 2026: Second place, Cliff Edom New America Award, NPPA Best of Photojournalism competition, for Tanner's Song
- 2026: Pulitzer Prize for Feature Photography, for his photographs of Tanner and Shay Martin

His work has also been recognized by organizations including Pictures of the Year International, the Overseas Press Club of America, the National Association of Black Journalists, the Atlanta Photojournalism Seminar and the Scripps Howard Awards.
