= Christina House =

American photojournalist

- Education: California State University, Fullerton
- Known for: Photography
- Style: Photojournalism
- Awards: Cliff Edom New America Award – National Press Photographers Association 2021; Pulitzer Prize for Feature Photography 2023; Winner, Domestic Photography – Robert F. Kennedy Journalism Award 2023

Christina House is an American photojournalist who works for the Los Angeles Times.

== Early life and education ==
House grew up in Long Beach, California and is a graduate of California State University, Fullerton.

== Career ==
She worked as a freelance photographer for 10 years and since 2017 has been a staff photojournalist at the Los Angeles Times. She won the 2023 Pulitzer Prize for Feature Photography for a piece about what it's like to be unhoused and pregnant on the streets of Hollywood for a young mother. House was part of a three-person team that also included reporter Gale Holland and videographer Claire Hannah Collins.

== Awards ==
- 2010: The Howard Chapnick Award, Missouri Photo Workshop, Missouri School of Journalism, Columbia, Missouri
- 2021: First Place, Cliff Edom New America Award, Best of Photojournalism Winners, National Press Photographers Association (NPPA), for "Mckenzie"
- 2023: Pulitzer Prize for Feature Photography, Pulitzer Prize, Columbia University, New York for "Hollywood's Finest"
- 2023: Winner, Domestic Photography category, Robert F. Kennedy Journalism Award, for "Hollywood's Finest"
