= The Charlotte Observer =

American newspaper in North Carolina

Coordinates: 35.220831°N 80.843422°W

- Front page on April 29, 2024
- Type: Daily newspaper
- Format: Broadsheet
- Owner: The McClatchy Company
- Editor: Rana Cash
- Founded: 1886; 140 years ago
- Language: English
- Headquarters: 550 South Caldwell Street; Charlotte, North Carolina 28202 U.S.
- Circulation: 54,012 Average print circulation 19,602 Digital Subscribers: Online; Avg. Mo. Unique Visitors: 3,955,000; Avg. Mo. Page Views: 24,372,000; (as of 2020)
- ISSN: 2331-7221
- OCLC number: 9554626
- Website: charlotteobserver.com

The Charlotte Observer is an American newspaper serving Charlotte, North Carolina, and its metro area. The Observer was founded in 1886. As of 2020, it had the second-largest circulation of any newspaper in the Carolinas. It is owned by The McClatchy Company.

== Overview ==
The Observer primarily serves Charlotte and Mecklenburg County and the surrounding counties of Iredell, Cabarrus, Union, Gaston, Catawba, Lincoln, and Lancaster and York in South Carolina. Home delivery service in outlying counties has declined in the 21st century, with delivery times growing later as the paper has outsourced circulation services outside the primary Charlotte area.

Circulation at The Charlotte Observer has been declining in the 21st century. In May 2011, Charlotte Observer circulation totaled 155,497 daily and 212,318 on Sunday. By 2017, daily circulation had declined to 69,987 and Sunday to 106,434.

The newspaper has an online presence and its staff also oversees a NASCAR news website, and a corresponding syndicated feature, That's Racin'. The Charlotte Observer also operates a food, drink and lifestyle vertical called CharlotteFive. The paper's television partner is WBTV.

The Observer offices also include editors and designers that make up the McClatchy NewsDesk-East, which is responsible for the production of The Charlotte Observer and McClatchy newspapers from across the region.

From 1927 to 2016, The Charlotte Observer was headquartered at 600 South Tryon Street. The facility included editorial offices, management offices, advertising offices, production, plus a large printing facility with a tunnel and underground railway system to feed paper to the presses. In 2016, the editorial offices moved to the NASCAR building on South Caldwell Street. The old facility was demolished and redeveloped into office space.

== History ==
The paper was founded in 1886 as the Charlotte Chronicle. The Chronicle was sold to Joseph Caldwell in 1892, and began appearing as the Charlotte Daily Observer on March 13, 1892. It was purchased by Knight Newspapers in 1955. Knight merged with Ridder Publications to form Knight Ridder in 1974. The Observer eventually became the fourth-largest newspaper in the Knight Ridder chain (behind The Philadelphia Inquirer and Daily News, Detroit Free Press and Miami Herald). In 1959, The Observer purchased The Charlotte News, Charlotte's afternoon newspaper. All operations were merged except editorial content, which was fused in 1983. The Observer ended circulation of the afternoon News in 1985.

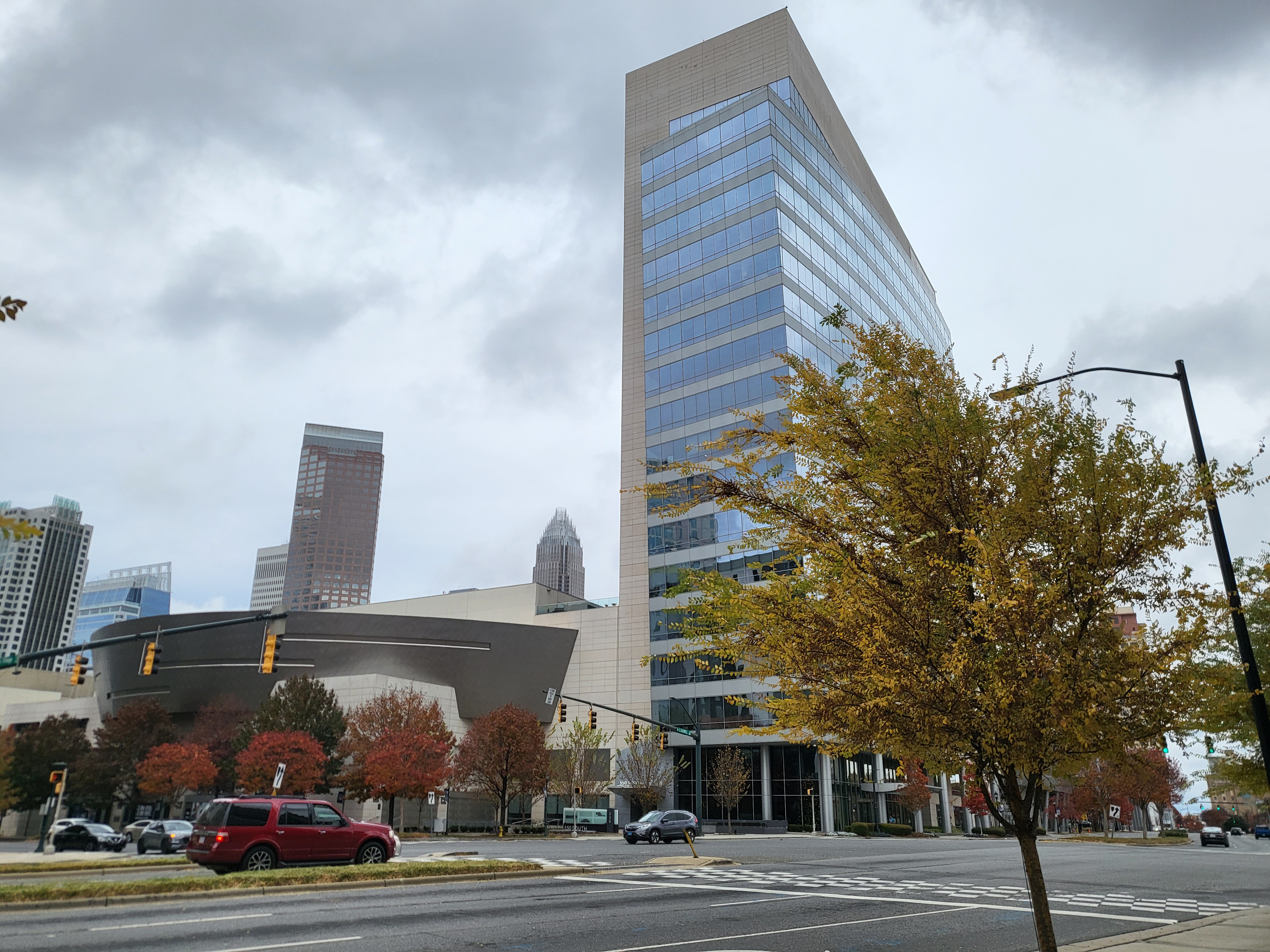
Current headquarters of The Charlotte Observer.

McClatchy purchased most of Knight Ridder's newspapers, including The Observer, in 2006. This made The Observer a sister publication of the state's largest paper, The News & Observer of Raleigh; and of The Herald of Rock Hill, the primary newspaper for the South Carolina side of the metro area. As of spring 2008, it was the fifth-largest newspaper in the McClatchy chain (behind The Kansas City Star, Miami Herald, Sacramento Bee and Fort Worth Star-Telegram). McClatchy's share value has been in decline since the purchase. The stock has lost over 95% of its value, far worse than many remaining newspaper companies.

On February 13, 2020, The McClatchy Company and 54 affiliated companies filed for Chapter 11 bankruptcy protection in the United States District Court for the Southern District of New York. The company cited pension obligations and excessive debt as the primary reasons for the filing.

On March 7, 2020, the Observer made the Saturday edition digital only. In July 2024, the newspaper announced it would decrease the number of print editions to three a week: Wednesdays, Fridays and Sundays. The paper would also be delivered by the postal service instead of by carrier.

== Pulitzer Prizes ==
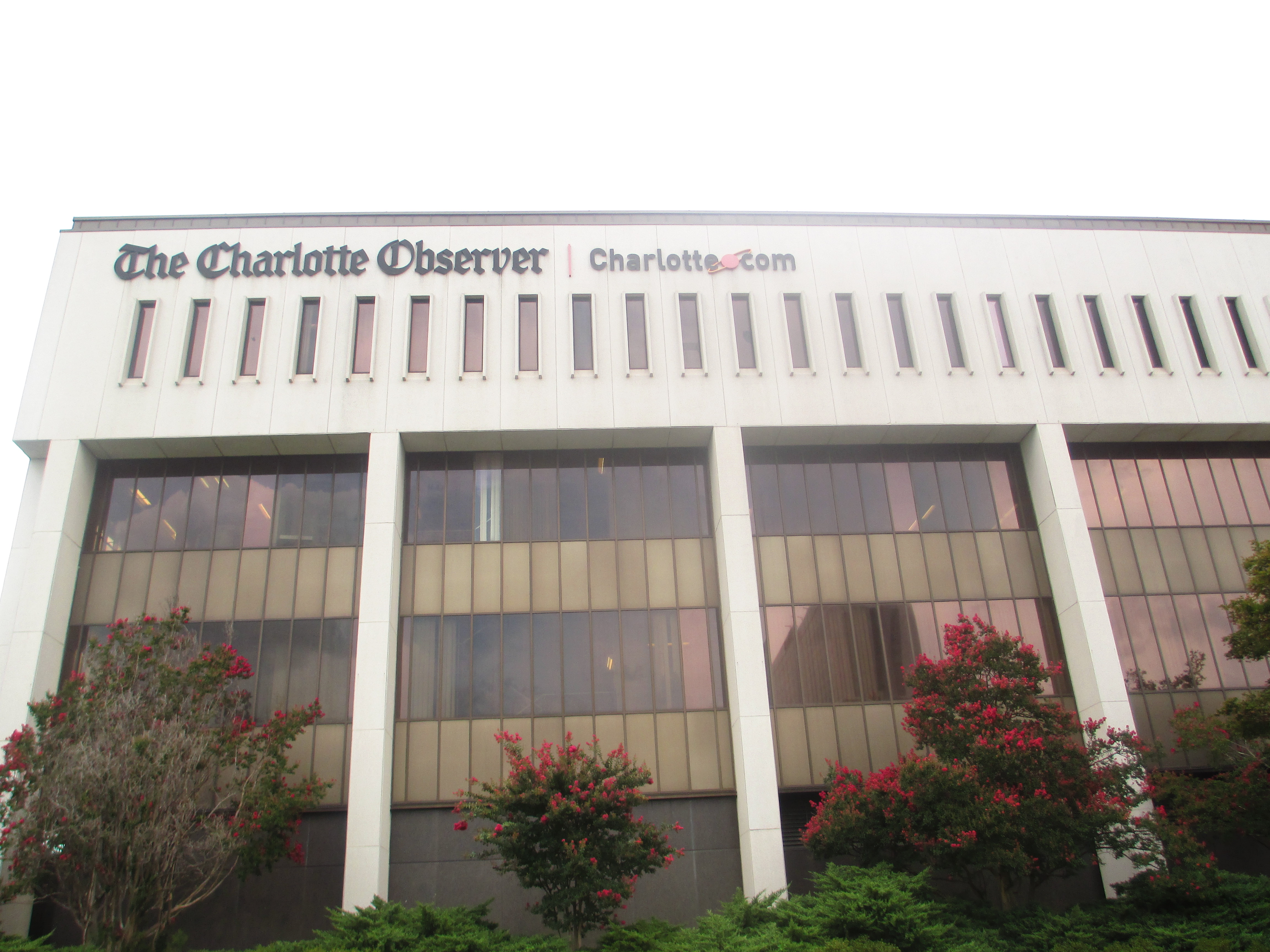
The Charlotte Observer former headquarters

The Charlotte Observer has won five Pulitzer Prizes:

- 1968 – Editorial cartooning, Eugene Payne
- 1981 – Public service, staff; "For Brown Lung: A Case of Deadly Neglect, a hard-hitting look at the terrible health consequences workers suffered from cotton dust produced in the region's textile mills."
- 1988 – Editorial cartooning, Doug Marlette (shared with the Atlanta Constitution)
- 1988 – Public service, staff; "For its investigation into the misuse of funds by Jim and Tammy Faye Bakker and their PTL ministries."
- 2014 – Editorial cartooning, Kevin Siers

== See also ==
- Jack Betts (journalist), past member of editorial board
- List of newspapers in North Carolina
- Richard Oppel, Editor (1978–1993)
