= Toshio Sakai =

Japanese photographer

- Born: March 31, 1940; Tokyo, Japan
- Died: November 21, 1999 (aged 59); Kamakura, Kanagawa Prefecture
- Education: Meiji University
- Spouse: Hideko Sakai
- Awards: Pulitzer Prize for Feature Photography; 1968 Dreams of Better Times

Sakai's Pulitzer Prize-winning photograph, "Dreams of Better Times"

Toshio Sakai (酒井 淑夫, Sakai Toshio; March 31, 1940 – November 21, 1999) was a Japanese photographer for United Press International. He was the first winner of the Pulitzer Prize for Feature Photography.

== Biography ==
External image
- Toshio Sakai in Vietnam

Toshio Sakai was born in Tōkai, Japan, on March 31, 1940. In 1964 he graduated from the Meiji University and subsequently joined United Press International as a darkroom technician. Within a year, he was promoted to the position of staff photographer. In 1965-1975 he worked for UPI, covering a wide range of topics and traveling to various hotspots around the world. He covered the Vietnam War and made several trips to the country in 1966-68. His close friend was another Japanese photographer and Pulitzer Prize winner Kyōichi Sawada. Tragically, Sawada was killed in Cambodian Takéo Province in October 1970, Sakai was the one who returned Sawada’s ashes to his widow.

In 1973, Sakai switched to the role of news picture editor. After the fall of Saigon in 1975, he became UPI’s photo manager in Seoul. In 1977, he became an independent freelance photographer, contributing to publications such as Newsweek, the Times, and other significant international publications. In 1986 he covered the overthrow of Ferdinand Marcos in the Philippines and riots at the Tiananmen Square in 1989.

In 1968, he received the Pulitzer Prize for Feature Photography for his photo "Dreams of Better Times" taken on June 17, 1967, during the Vietnam War. He was the first person to receive that award. The photo showed an American soldier asleep on a pile of sandbags under a heavy monsoon rain, while his comrade was standing guard. Their troop located at the Landing Zone Rufe in 36 miles northeast Of Phuc Vinh, they had a brief rest after sniper and mortar fire.

UPI selected Toshio Sakai for a trip to Laos, but his appearance was considered too Japanese and good-looking and he couldn’t be disguised as a Vietnamese, that is why the crew chief “always told him to get lost”. In 1968 Sakai became the photo director of the Tokyo bureau of Agence France-Presse, in 1994 he founded a video film planning company.

Sakai died from a heart attack at the age of 59.

== Sources ==
- Hirashiki, Yasutsune (2017). On the Frontlines of the Television War: A Legendary War Cameraman in Vietnam. Oxford: Casemate. ISBN 978-1-61200-472-3.
- Fischer, Heinz-Dietrich; Fischer, Erika J. (2000). Press Photography Award 1942–1998: From Joe Rosenthal and Horst Faas to Moneta Sleet and Stan Grossfeld. Munich: Walter de Gruyter GmbH & Co KG. pp. 59–60. ISBN 3-598-30170-7.
- Brennan, Elizabeth A.; Clarage, Elizabeth C. (1999). Who's who of Pulitzer Prize Winners. Phoenix: Oryx Press. p. 205. ISBN 1-57356-111-8.
