= Deanne Fitzmaurice =

American photographer

- Born: Melrose, Massachusetts, USA
- Occupation: Photographer
- Spouse: Kurt Rogers

Deanne Fitzmaurice is an American photographer and photojournalist. She was awarded the Pulitzer Prize for Feature Photography in 2005.

== Biography and career ==
Born in Melrose, Massachusetts, Fitzmaurice graduated in 1983 with a B.F.A in photography from the Academy of Art College in San Francisco, California.

She joined the San Francisco Chronicle in 1989, working there until 2008. The celebrities she photographed included Barack Obama, Steven Spielberg and Jerry Seinfeld.

She has contributed to a number of journals including Time, Newsweek, U.S. News & World Report, Sports Illustrated, ESPN the Magazine and People.

In 2005, together with her husband, Kurt Rogers, she was one of the co-founders of Think Tank Photo, which produces camera bags.

== Awards ==
In 2005, she received the Pulitzer Prize for Feature Photography for her series illustrating the story of "the near-death of a young Iraqi boy, who was horribly injured by an improvised explosive device, to his triumphal recovery in the United States." Fitzmaurice followed the progress of Saleh Khalaf over 13 months in an Oakland hospital beginning in November 2003.

In 2004, Fitzmaurice's same work, “Operation Lion Heart,” also received the Casey Medal for Meritorious Journalism in 2005. Additionally, Fitzmaurice received the Mark Twain Award.

== Books ==
- Fitzmaurice, Deanne; Ryan, Joan (2010). Freak Season. K & D Photography, Incorporated. ISBN 978-0-615-42839-0.
