= Craig F. Walker =

American photojournalist

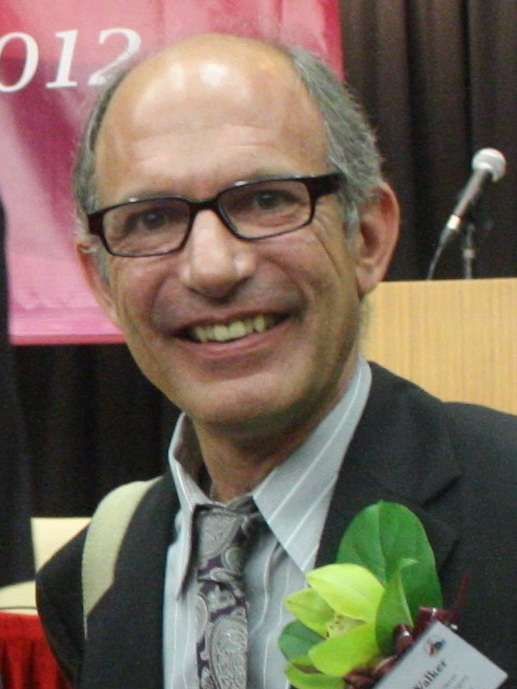
- Walker in 2012
- Education: Rhode Island School of Photography
- Occupation: Photojournalist
- Employer: The Boston Globe
- Awards: Pulitzer Prize for Feature Photography

Craig F. Walker is an American photojournalist. In 2010, he won the Pulitzer Prize for Feature Photography "for his intimate portrait of a teenager who joins the Army at the height of insurgent violence in Iraq, poignantly searching for meaning and manhood. In 2012, Walker won again the same prize in the Feature Photography category for his photodocumentary "Welcome Home". He is on the staff of The Boston Globe.

== Background ==
After growing up in York, Pennsylvania, United States, Walker attended the Rhode Island School of Photography, graduating in 1986.

He worked for Marlboro Enterprise and The Berkshire Eagle, prior to taking a position with The Denver Post in 1998. He has covered national and international stories. In 2004, he won first place from the National Press Photographers Association for a photographic series on child camel jockeys in Kuwait.

== Pulitzer Prizes ==
Walker was inspired to embark on the series that netted him his Pulitzer by a conversation among editors wondering what kind of person, in 2007, would sign up for the military knowing he would be going to war. Walker spent over two years photographing American teenager Ian Fisher in his transition from high-school student to soldier. Published in September 2009, "Ian Fisher: American Soldier" earned a grand prize in the 2009 "Photos of the Year" competition hosted by Editor & Publisher before garnering for Walker the 2010 Pulitzer Prize. The series includes not only photographs, but also video and multimedia. The series also earned The Hillman Prize for Photojournalism, sharing the award with "Below the Line: Childhood Poverty in Colorado", also published by The Denver Post.

In 2012, Walker won a second Pulitzer Prize for Feature Photography "for his compassionate chronicle of an honorably discharged veteran, home from Iraq and struggling with a severe case of post-traumatic stress."
