= Eugene Payne =

Eugene Gray Payne (January 29, 1919 – October 14, 2010) was a Pulitzer Prize winning American political cartoonist and writer. He attended Syracuse University on an art scholarship. After college he served in the Army Air Forces as a weather scout.

In 1958 Payne began working for The Charlotte Observer as their first cartoonist. He was their full time cartoonist from 1960 to 1971. Publisher Rolfe Neil said Payne "Had a loyal following of readers, particularly people interested in local issues and local government." He won the 1967 Sigma Delta Chi Award for a cartoon of President Lyndon B Johnson on a bus holding a crying baby labeled "Vietnam War" while the bus driver said "Dr. King says, would you please move to the back of the bus". The cartoon implied that the Vietnam War was secondary to civil rights issues in America. In 1968 Payne won the Pulitzer Prize for a group of ten cartoons that focused on the Vietnam War and Civil Rights Issues.

One of Payne's most famous cartoons was the one he drew in 1965 marking the death of Winston Churchill. It showed Churchill in a hat with a big cigar rising above the earth with his right hand forming a "V" for victory. The Charlotte Observer sold more than 8,000 reprints of the cartoon.

After an eleven-year stint with the Charlotte Observer Payne went to work at WSOC-TV as an editorial cartoonist. Until 1978 he drew cartoons, wrote and directed documentaries for the station. In 1978 he returned to the Charlotte Observer where he drew four cartoons per week. As he grew older that number decreased to one cartoon a week. His last cartoon was published in 2009. Payne died in 2010 at the age of 91.
