= Murad Sezer =

Turkish photographer (born 1969)

Murad Sezer (born 1969) is a Turkish photographer.

== Life and work ==
Sezer was born to Turkish parents in Germany and moved to Istanbul as a child.

Sezer has a journalism B.A. from Istanbul University. He built a career as a sports photographer in the Turkish media 10 years before he joined Associated Press in 1996. He was part of Associated Press team that won the Pulitzer Prize for Breaking News Photography in 2005 with his photo of US Marines praying over a Marine killed while fighting insurgent strongholds in Fallujah (other people from the team were Bilal Hussein, Karim Kadim, Brennan Linsley, Jim MacMillan, Samir Mizban, Khalid Mohammed, John B. Moore, Muhammad Muheisen, Anja Niedringhaus and Mohammed Uraibi).

In April 2009 he joined Reuters News as chief photographer for Turkey.
