= E. Jason Wambsgans =

American journalist

E. Jason Wambsgans is a photojournalist working for the Chicago Tribune. He was awarded the Pulitzer Prize in Feature Photography for his portrait of gun violence in Chicago.

== Early life ==
Wambsgans was born in Detroit and graduated from Central Michigan University.

== Career ==
Wambsgans was one of three journalists awarded the Pulitzer Prize for Feature Photography in 2017. Wambsgans' Pulitzer-winning piece followed a 10-year-old Chicago gunshot victim for three months, during which time Wambsgans developed a personal relationship with the child.

Wambsgans has worked at the Chicago Tribune as a staff photographer since 2002 and does photo stories reflecting events in, and around, the town. Wambsgans worked on a piece about US attorney Zachary Fardon, as he resigned from his position due to President Trump asking all 46 US attorneys that were under Obama to step down in a "uniform transition". Aside from his work with the Chicago Tribune, Wambsgans runs an Instagram account dedicated to black-and-white photography captured on his cellphone.
