= Matt Rainey =

American photographer

Matt Rainey is an American photographer. He received the 2001 Pulitzer Prize for Feature Photography. Rainey was also part of the group that received the 2004 Pulitzer Prize for breaking news and reporting. In addition, he has received more than 200 awards during his career.

== Personal life ==
Rainey was born on April 14, 1966, in Denville Township, New Jersey. He currently resides in the Annandale section of Clinton Township, New Jersey. He married Michelle Seagall Rainey in 2003.

== Education ==
Rainey attended West Morris Central High School in Chester Township, New Jersey, and graduated in 1984. He then attended the School of Visual Arts in New York as a film major for a year before changing his major to photography, attending Rutgers University in New Jersey and graduating with a Bachelor of Fine Arts in photography in 1988.

== Career ==
Rainey has worked as a photographer for many entities including the Daily Record, The News Tribune, The Star-Ledger, Rodale, Inc. and Weidenheimer Creative. He also works with several other companies as a freelance photographer.

== Awards ==
Rainey was awarded the 2001 Pulitzer Prize for Feature Photography while covering the dormitory fire at Seton Hall University for The Star-Ledger. The photo series, "After the Fire" covered the experience and recovery of two Seton Hall University students.

He received his second Pulitzer in 2005 for Breaking News Reporting as part of the group covering New Jersey governor Jim McGreeney’s resignation

Rainey is also the recipient of the 2001 Robert F. Kennedy Award for Domestic Photojournalism and the 2005 Taylor Family Award for Fairness in Newspapers, administered by the Neiman Foundation for Journalism at Harvard University.

He is the recipient of the Sigma Delta Chi Gold Medal administered by the Society of Professional Journalists.

Rainey has been named the runner up for the Casey Medal for Meritorious Journalism, the DART Award. He holds Best in Show honors in both, The National Headliners Competition and the Society for News Design.
