= Stan Grossfeld =

- Born: December 20, 1951 (age 74)
- Education: Boston University College of Communication; Rochester Institute of Technology
- Occupation: Photojournalist

Stan Grossfeld (born December 20, 1951) is an associate editor at The Boston Globe who has won two Pulitzer Prizes for photojournalism. He was born in New York City and graduated from the Rochester Institute of Technology with a B.S. in Professional Photography in 1973. After two years in Newark, New Jersey, at The Star-Ledger he went to work for The Boston Globe. While working there he completed a Master of Journalism at Boston University in 1980. He became chief photographer at the Globe in 1983. Next year he won the Pulitzer Prize for Spot News Photography for a "series of unusual photographs which reveal the effects of war on the people of Lebanon" (Lebanese Civil War, third phase). In 1985 he won the Feature Photography Pulitzer for a "series of photographs of the famine in Ethiopia and for his pictures of illegal aliens on the Mexican border." Named associate editor of the Globe in 1987, Grossfeld photographs many subjects, including sports.
