= David Moats =

American editorialist

David Moats is an American editorialist, known for winning a Pulitzer Prize in 2001 for his series of 10 editorials on issues revolving around civil unions for same-sex couples.

== Early life and education ==
Moats was born in Salt Lake City, Utah in 1947. He graduated from the University of California, Santa Barbara with a Bachelor's degree in English in 1969. He was a Peace Corps Volunteer in Afghanistan from 1969-1972.

== Career ==
Moats began working for the Rutland Herald in 1982. He was an editorial page editor for the Rutland Herald and the Barre Montpelier Times Argus from 1992-2018. Before becoming an editorial page editor, he was a wire editor, state editor, assisting managing editor and city editor. The newspapers eliminated Moats' position and let him go in February 2018.

He has written eleven plays, four of which have been produced by theater companies in Vermont. His play, “Hard News” won the Vermont Playwright's Award from The Valley Players in Waitsfield, Vermont in 1987.

Moats was also a Pulitzer Prize juror in 2002 judging commentary and in 2003 judging editorial cartooning.

== Personal life ==
He lives in Middlebury, Vermont, and has three children. He occasionally appears on Vermont Public Radio as a commentator.
