= The Blade (Toledo, Ohio) =

American daily newspaper from Toledo, Ohio

- The July 27, 2005, front page of The Blade
- Type: Daily newspaper
- Format: Broadsheet
- Owner: Block Communications
- Publisher: John Robinson Block
- Editor: Kim Bates
- Founded: 1835
- Headquarters: 541 North Superior Street; Toledo, Ohio 43660
- Circulation: 119,901 daily 141,141 Sunday (as of 2008)
- ISSN: 2578-9961
- OCLC number: 12962717
- Website: toledoblade.com

The Blade, also known as the Toledo Blade, is a newspaper in Toledo, Ohio, published daily online and printed Thursday and Sunday by Block Communications. The newspaper was first published on December 19, 1835.

== Overview ==
The first issue of what was then the Toledo Blade was printed on December 19, 1835. It has been published daily since 1848 and is the oldest continuously run business in Toledo.

David Ross Locke gained national fame for the paper during the Civil War era by writing under the pen name Petroleum V. Nasby. Under this name, he wrote satires ranging on topics from slavery, to the Civil War, to temperance. President Abraham Lincoln was fond of the Nasby satires and sometimes quoted them. In 1867 Locke bought the Toledo Blade.

In the middle of 20th century, The Blade was described as "by all odds the most potent political force in Toledo... it wields immense influence. It has made, broken and chastened many a politician. It has pushed through or blocked many a public policy. When it gives the word and applies the heat, Council is normally quick to respond."

The paper dropped "Toledo" from its masthead in 1960.

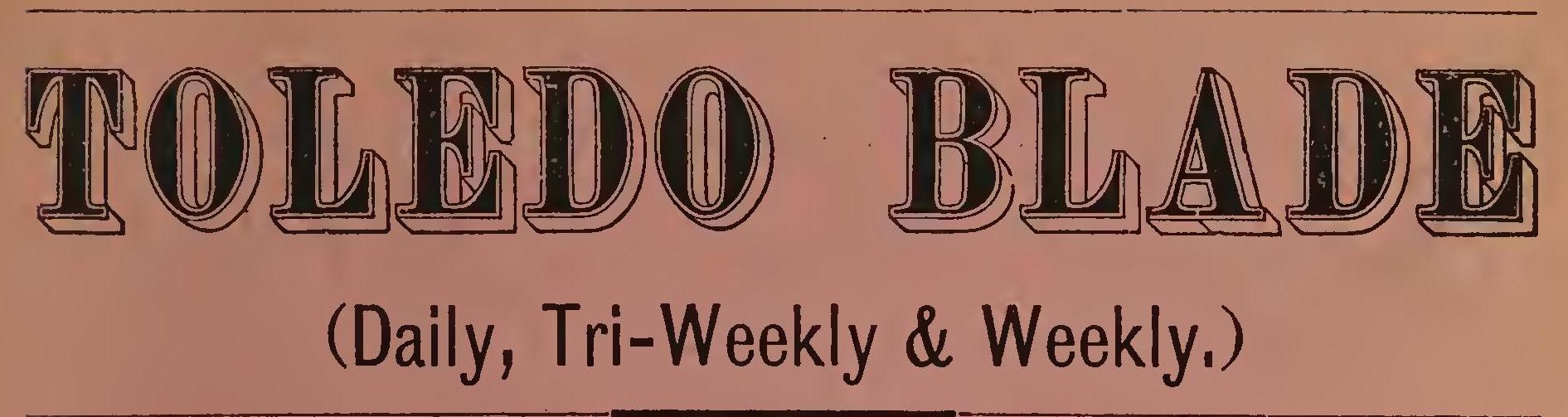
Toledo Blade in 1868 ad from Scott's Annual Toledo City Directory

In 2004 The Blade won the Pulitzer Prize for Investigative Reporting with a series of stories entitled "Buried Secrets, Brutal Truths". The story brought to light the story of the Tiger Force, a Vietnam fighting force that brutalized the local population. In 2006, The Blade was a finalist for a Pulitzer Prize, and winner of the National Headliner Award, for breaking the scandal in Ohio known as Coingate.

As of 2015, the editor in chief is John Robinson Block. His family purchased the paper in 1926. They also own the media conglomerate Block Communications, which owns cable systems, television stations, and the Internet service provider Buckeye Express.

As of 2008, The Blade had the 83rd largest daily newspaper circulation in the United States.

The Toledo Blade was named for the famed swordsmithing industry of the original city of Toledo, Spain. Its motto, on the nameplate below the title, is "One of America's Great Newspapers."

On September 8, 2026, Block Communications announced that The Blade will cease operations on December 31, if no buyer could be found.

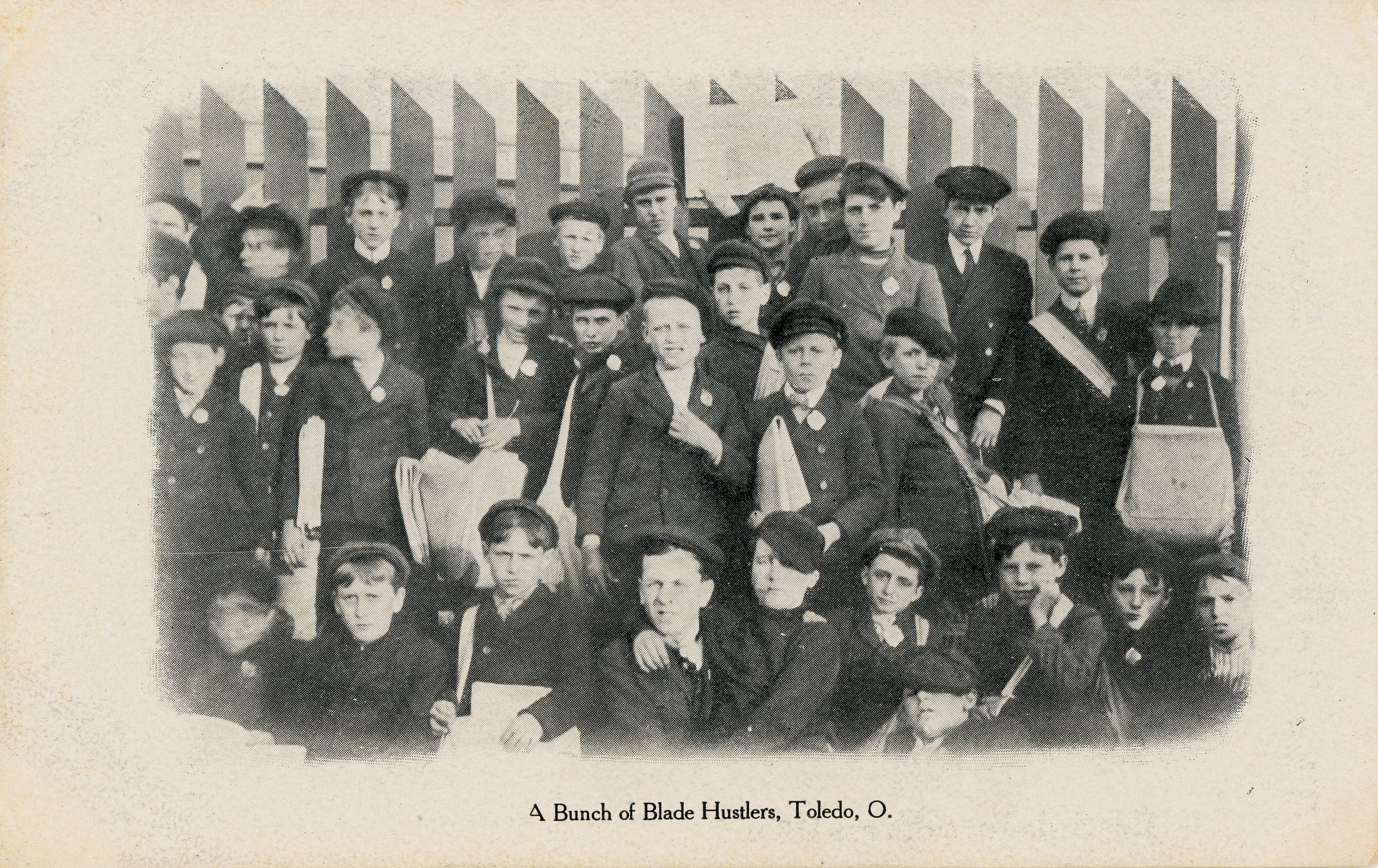
Toledo Blade Newsboys, 1900s

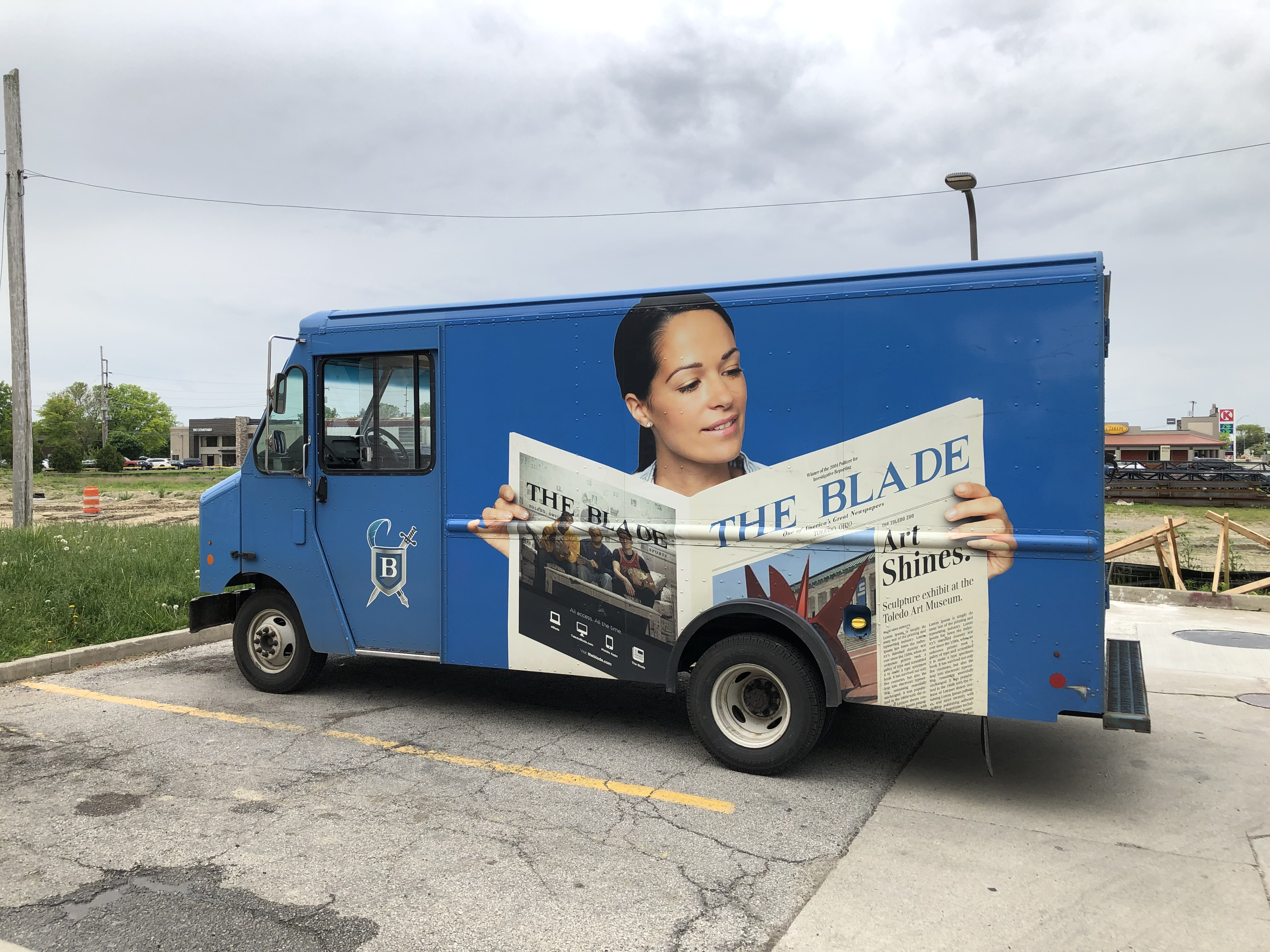
A Toledo Blade delivery vehicle in Bowling Green, Ohio.

== Events ==
In 2007 photojournalist Allan Detrich left The Blade when it was discovered that he had digitally altered a photo that was published on the front page of the March 31, 2007, edition. A subsequent investigation revealed that he had digitally altered and submitted 79 photos during the first 14 weeks of 2007, 58 of which ran either in The Blade or on its website.

Members of several unions worked without contracts from March to August 2006. Over the course of August 2006, The Blade locked out over 25% of its employees. The strike and lockout ended in May 2007.

In May 2014, Block Communications announced plans to close The Blade's production facility, including the printing presses, located in the downtown headquarters building.

=== Toledo Free Press lawsuit ===
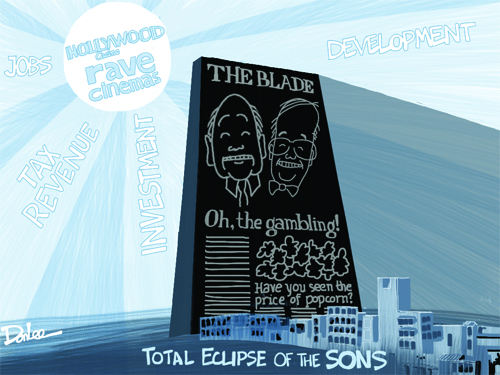
August 2011 Toledo Free Press editorial cartoon which prompted a lawsuit from The Blade

In October 2011, The Blade filed a lawsuit against rival publication the Toledo Free Press, claiming that former Blade general manager and current Free Press publisher Thomas F. Pounds violated a 2004 separation agreement containing a non-compete clause. According to the Free Press, The Blade took exception to an editorial cartoon criticizing The Blade's stance on downtown development plans by Rave Cinemas and Hollywood Casino Toledo; The Blade cited the cartoon among the grounds for its lawsuit: "On or about August 21, 2011, Pounds... permitted Toledo Free Press to publish a cartoon that depicted a characterization of John R. Block and Allan Block together with The Blade as casting an eclipsing shadow on jobs, tax revenue, investment and development in Toledo, Ohio."

In December 2011, the Free Press responded to the lawsuit and filed a counterclaim, asserting that Blade owners Block Communications were "attempting to exercise prior restraint" on the Free Press and that since the non-compete agreement expired in 2005, the Blade's use of it as a legal weapon in 2011 was "simply as a tool to economically harm" the Free Press and its publisher, and "well beyond the bounds of fair and legal competition."
