= Lorenzo Tugnoli =

Italian photojournalist (born 1979)

Lorenzo Tugnoli (born 1979) is an Italian photojournalist, based in Beirut. He won the 2019 Pulitzer Prize for Feature Photography.

== Life and work ==
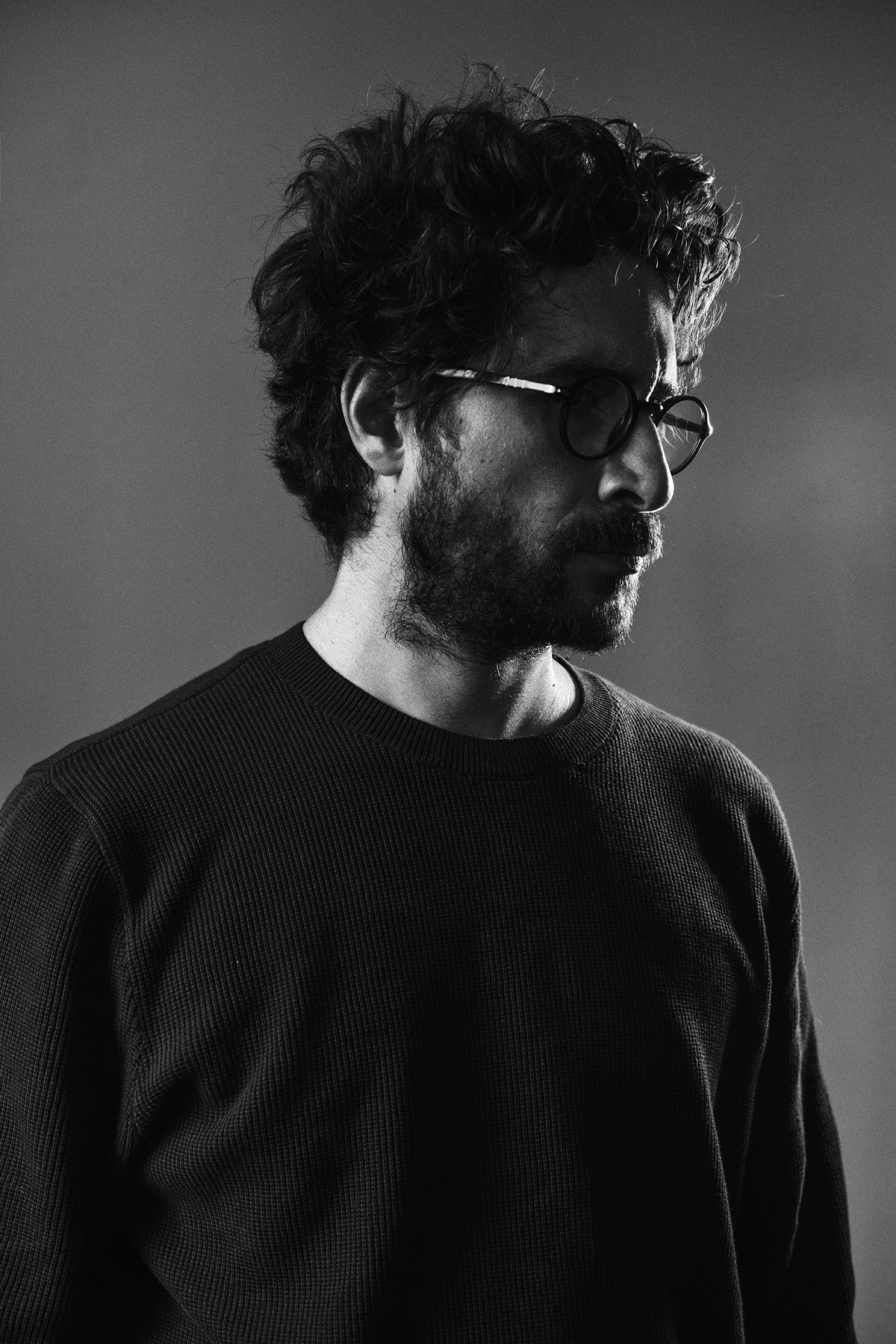
Lorenzo Tugnoli

Tugnoli was born and raised in Lugo, Emilia-Romagna, Italy.

He worked as a photojournalist in the Middle East before moving to Kabul, Afghanistan in 2010, where he lived and worked before moving to Beirut, Lebanon in 2015. In 2026, Tugnoli's work has been featured in The Washington Post, documenting the Palestinian diaspora.

== Publications ==
- The Little Book of Kabul. 2014. Photographs by Tugnoli, text by Francesca Recchia.

== Awards ==
- 2019: Winner, Pulitzer Prize for Feature Photography for photo storytelling of the famine in Yemen published in The Washington Post
- 2019: Nominee, World Press Story of the Year, World Press Photo, Amsterdam
- 2019: Winner, General news, stories, World Press Photo, Amsterdam
- 2020: Winner, Contemporary Issues, Stories, World Press Photo
- 2021: Winner, Spot News, Stories, World Press Photo
