= Sam Anderson (writer) =

American author

Sam Anderson is an American author, who is a staff writer at The New York Times Magazine and the author of Boom Town, a book about Oklahoma City. Formerly, Anderson was a book critic for the magazine New York .

== Early life and education ==
Anderson was born in Eugene, Oregon, and grew up in the small town of Lodi, California. He holds a bachelor’s and master's degree in English from Louisiana State University.

== Recognition ==
In 2007 he received the Balakian Award for Excellence in Criticism from the National Book Critics Circle.

In 2017, he won a National Magazine Award for his article about Michelangelo's David.

== Works ==
- Boom Town: The Fantastical Saga of Oklahoma City, its Chaotic Founding... its Purloined Basketball Team, and the Dream of Becoming a World-class Metropolis, Crown, 2018, ISBN 978-0804137317
