= David Guttenfelder =

American photojournalist (born 1969)

- Born: 1969 (age 56–57)
- Education: University of Iowa
- Occupation: Photojournalist

David Guttenfelder (born 1969) is an American photojournalist focusing on geopolitical conflict, conservation, and culture. He is currently a photographer with National Geographic, based in Minneapolis. He is known for his photos of North Korea.

== Early life and education ==
Guttenfelder grew up as a native of Waukee, Iowa. It wasn't until 1990, studying Swahili as a foreign exchange student at the University of Dar es Salaam in Tanzania, where he began to explore photography.

After he returned to the U.S., he pursued his undergraduate studies at the University of Iowa. In the summer of 1993, an extreme rainfall forced the Iowa River to swell, threatening the central University of Iowa campus. He began to document the watery encroachment as a Daily Iowan photographer.

== Career ==
In 1994, Guttenfelder started his photography career in East Africa with the Associated Press. He was based in Kenya, the Ivory Coast, India and Japan. In 1994, he covered the Rwandan genocide. In 2000, Guttenfelder spent more than a decade covering the wars in Afghanistan and Iraq. During that time, he also started taking trips to North Korea. Later he covered the Israeli Palestinian conflict, the 2008 election of President Obama, as well as the tsunami and nuclear disaster in Japan. In 2011, he helped the Associated Press open a bureau in Pyongyang, making it the first western news agency to have an office in the country. From 2012 to 2014, he traveled to North Korea almost every month and stepped down from his post as chief Asia photographer for the Associated Press.

In summer 2014, after two decades of constant travel, Guttenfelder accepted a new assignment with National Geographic to photograph Yellowstone National Park. In 2016, he boarded the first cruise ship in decades to travel from the United States to Cuba, and returned to the island to cover Fidel Castro's four-day funeral procession. He returned on several occasions on assignments for National Geographic, publishing in photo essays and on social media platforms like Instagram. Later that year, Guttenfelder traveled to Tanzania to photograph portraits of Jane Goodall for National Geographic's documentary Jane, which was released in 2017.

He is now back in the US as a National Geographic Society fellow, capturing the relationship between people and wildlife. He is photographically exploring his own country and culture for the first time in his professional career. On May 25, 2020, Guttenfelder documented peoples' reactions to the murder of George Floyd in Minneapolis where he lived.

== Awards ==
- 2002: World Press Photo Award
- 2005: World Press Photo Award
- 2006: Photojournalist of the Year, National Press Photographers Association (NPPA).
- 2006: World Press Photo Award
- 2007: World Press Photo Award
- 2008: First Place, Pictures of the Year International (POYi) Award
- 2009: Public Prize (Reader's Award) (along with four others), Days Japan International Photojournalism Awards.
- 2010: World Press Photo Award
- 2012: Time magazine Instagram Photo of the Year.
- 2012: Finalist, 2012 Pulitzer Prize in Feature Photography.
- 2012: Overseas Press Club John Faber, Oliver Rebbot & Feature Photography Awards
- 2012: World Press Photo Award
- 2013: Time magazine Instagram Photographer of the Year
- 2013: Infinity Award from the International Center of Photography.
- 2014: Shorty Award for Online Photography
- 2016: World Press Photo Award
- Online Journalism Award
