= Boland Hall fire =

2000 fatal fire in New Jersey, US

Coordinates: 40°44′38.5″N 74°14′53.2″W

- Date: January 19, 2000
- Time: 4:29 a.m.
- Venue: Boland Hall, Seton Hall University
- Location: South Orange, New Jersey, United States
- Type: Fire
- Cause: Arson
- Deaths: 3
- Injuries: 56-62
- Convicted: Sean Ryan; Joseph LePore
- Sentence: 5 years prison

The Boland Hall fire was a fatal fire in Boland Hall, a freshman residence hall on the Seton Hall University campus in South Orange, New Jersey, United States on January 19, 2000. Three students died and 58 were injured, several with very serious burns. It was one of the deadliest college fires in recent U.S. history.

Two students who started the fire as a prank were indicted in mid-2003, reached a plea agreement with prosecutors in late 2006, and were sentenced to five years' imprisonment in early 2007.

== Building ==
Boland Hall is a multi-story brick dormitory used by 600 freshmen at Seton Hall University. The building was built in multiple stages between 1952 and 1966 and lacked sprinklers, which was permitted by the state fire code as the structure was completed before sprinklers were mandated. Students knew the building for having consistently egregious fire alarms, including a series of alarms during finals week. As a result, residents often assumed fire alarms were egregious and slow to react. In an interview, one resident discussed how students hid under beds or in showers to avoid the resident assistants who forced students to evacuate into cold weather during previous alarms.

Several fire hoses inside the building were previously disconnected by the University, which cited firefighters' preference to use their own equipment. Other hoses were reportedly inoperable after neglect, although 55 fire extinguishers were stashed inside. Boland Hall had a history of minor fires, including two on the same day in 1996.

== Fire ==
The fire began around 4:30 a.m. on January 19, 2000, when most students were asleep. Two students, later identified as Sean Ryan and Joseph LePore, set fire to a paper banner that had been partially torn off from a wall display, located in a third floor lounge. In their account, the two men were intoxicated and decided to set fire to the banner as a prank, which would cause the smoke detectors to go off and the students would evacuate into 20 °F (−7 °C) weather. Ryan lit a match, passed it to LePore, who passed it back to Ryan, who "flicked" it onto the corner of the banner. They then left the banner smoldering and unattended before returning to their room about 30 feet (9.1 m) from the lounge. The fire spread rapidly across three couches in the third floor lounge and approached temperatures of up to 1,500 °F (820 °C) in less than five minutes.

Though no accelerant was used, the fire burned hot enough to melt the synthetic carpet of the hall, causing severe injuries to many of the students attempting to escape the conflagration by crawling on the floor to reach the stairs. In an effort to aid the evacuation of students, the resident assistant for the third floor, Dana Christmas, ran down the halls and knocked on doors in an effort to wake students up and alert them to the danger.

Most students on the third floor evacuated through the thick smoke using the staircases; a few jumped over 40 feet (12 m) to the ground.

Despite the chaos, multiple students were unaware of any emergency. One student in the building learned of the fire two hours after it started from a phone call from her father, while another resident slept through the event and woke up at 1 p.m. after the building had been searched for survivors.

== Victims ==
Three students died; Aaron Karol and Frank Caltabilota died of thermal injuries, and John Giunta died due to smoke inhalation. Two of the deceased were found in a lounge, and the third was found in a nearby room. Fifty-six students, police officers and firefighters were injured, four seriously enough to require lengthy hospital stays and rehabilitation.

The three students who died were honored with bachelor's degrees at the Class of 2003 graduation ceremony. On anniversaries of the fire, the University hosts a memorial Mass in honor of the victims at the memorial installed near the dormitory.

== Aftermath ==
As the dormitory did not have sprinklers, they were installed in all dormitories on Seton Hall's campus in the summer of 2000. Shortly after the fire, New Jersey passed legislation that required all dormitories to have sprinklers within four years. In 2017, US Senator Bob Menendez, US Representative Bill Pascrell, and US Representative Donald Payne Jr. joined safety advocates, local officials and University representatives to announce the Campus Fire Safety Education Act. Through the Act, higher education institutions could apply on their own or in collaboration with nonprofit fire safety organizations and public safety departments to receive funding to initiate, expand or improve fire safety programs on campus.

== Investigations ==
A report about the fire was created for the legal team for the defense by Doug Carpenter and Rick Roby, who are fire investigators at Combustion Science & Engineering Inc., who had previously filed another report that claimed the prosecutor's investigation was biased. The investigation following the fire reported that faulty reporting procedures as well as inadequate fire safety precautions by officials at Seton Hall University contributed substantially to the deaths and injuries. It also revealed that Boland Hall lacked sprinklers, although the university claimed that at the time that the residence hall was still in compliance with the building code. The report created by the defense team found that the ignition location for the fire was most likely a dropped cigarette and not arson.

In response, New Jersey enacted the first mandatory residence hall sprinkler law in the nation.

== Litigation ==
A state law provided legal immunity to Seton Hall University from negligence claims, due to its status as a religious, nonprofit charitable institution. However, in 2001, the University reached a settlement deal with families of some of the victims, including two that died in the fire and 10 that were injured.

After a three-and-a-half-year investigation, on June 12, 2003, a 60-count indictment charged two freshmen students, Sean Ryan and Joseph LePore, with starting the fire and felony murder for the deaths which resulted. During an attempt to arrest LePore, officers used an unmarked police vehicle with sirens and lights to get LePore to stop his vehicle; however LePore backed his vehicle into the police officers after both had come to a stop.

On November 15, 2006, LePore and Ryan admitted that they had set the fire and pleaded guilty to third-degree arson as well as witness tampering. LePore also pleaded guilty to a disorderly persons charge after he had attempted to avoid police when he was arrested on the 2003 indictment. Their pleas were part of a plea deal, in which they pled guilty for a reduced sentence and dropped charges against LePore's parents, sister and friend that included hindering apprehension.

On January 26, 2007, they were sentenced to five years in a youth correctional facility, but were eligible for parole after 16 months. The families of the victims strongly condemned the two suspects during the sentencing hearing, calling them "cowards" for running away after setting the fire instead of helping to evacuate the dorm.

On March 31, 2008, both LePore and Ryan were denied parole from the Garden State Youth Correctional Facility in Yardville, where they had been incarcerated since February 2007. LePore was to be eligible for parole after another 18 months, and Ryan after another 11.

On May 6, 2009, Ryan was released on parole. However, LePore waived his right to be considered for parole and decided to serve out the remainder of his prison sentence and was scheduled to be released no later than 2010. LePore served less than three years in confinement.

Following Ryan's release, he reportedly moved to New York City to work in business. He has a wife and child. LePore married in 2012, started a family, and is reported to be in the home-improvement business.

== Depiction in media ==
Matt Rainey won the 2001 Pulitzer Prize for Feature Photography for his series in The Star-Ledger depicting the recovery of two students who sustained serious burns and injuries from the fire. The recovery of two of the injured students was also documented by Guido Verweyen, who created the documentary "After the Fire: A True Story of Heroes & Cowards".
