= List of Pulitzer Prizes awarded to The Washington Post =

The Washington Post has won 68 Pulitzer Prizes in journalism, the second-highest prize count among all newspaper and magazines in the United States, behind The New York Times. The Post has won the Pulitzer Prize gold medal for Public Service, the most prestigious of the awards, on six occasions. In 2008, the Post won a record six prizes in a single year, the most of any year for the newspaper.

The Pulitzer Prize is a prize awarded within the United States for excellence in journalism in a range of categories. First awarded in 1917, prizes have been awarded every year since, though not in every category. News organizations submit work, or series of works, for consideration to a 19-member board, which is composed of editors, columnists, media executives, artists, as well as academic administrators from Columbia University, which administers the prize.

== Awards ==
=== 1930s ===
- 1936: Felix Morley, in Editorial Writing, for "Prosperity of the Spirit" and other columns published that year.

=== 1940s ===
- 1947: Edward T. Folliard, in Telegraphic Reporting, for his series of articles on Columbians, Inc.
- 1949: Herbert Elliston, in Editorial Writing, for "Church Unity" and two other columns published that year.

=== 1950s ===
- 1954: Herbert L. Block, in Editorial Cartooning, for a cartoon "depicting the robed figure of Death saying to Stalin after he died, 'You Were Always A Great Friend of Mine, Joseph.'”

=== 1960s ===
- 1968: Alfred Friendly, in International Reporting, for his coverage of the Six-Day War.

=== 1970s ===
- 1970: Philip L. Geyelin, in Editorial Writing, for "Lyndon Johnson's Presidency" and other columns published that year.
- 1971: Jimmie Lee Hoagland, in International Reporting, for his coverage of South African apartheid.
- 1973: Staff of The Washington Post, in Public Service, for its investigation of the Watergate scandal.
- 1973: David S. Broder, in Commentary, for "Muskie's Self-Discipline" and other columns published that year.
- 1975: Matthew Lewis, in Feature Photography, for his photographs "in color and black and white."
- 1976: Alan M. Kriegsman, in Criticism, for his writing about the dance during 1975.
- 1977: George F. Will, of The Washington Post Writers Group, in Commentary, for body of work.
- 1977: William McPherson, in Criticism, for his "contribution to 'Book World.'"
- 1978: Meg Greenfield, in Editorial Writing, for "The Ford Years" and other columns published that year.
- 1979: Herbert L. Block, in Editorial Cartooning, for his work.

=== 1980s ===
- 1983: Loretta Tofani, in Local Investigative Specialized Reporting for her investigation of rape and sexual assault in a jail in Prince George's County, Maryland.
- 1987: Charles Krauthammer, of The Washington Post Writers Group, in Commentary, for his columns on national issues.
- 1987: Berke Breathed, of The Washington Post Writers Group, in Editorial Cartooning, for his work.
- 1988: Tom Shales, in Criticism, for his television criticism.
- 1989: Glenn Frankel, in International Reporting, for his reporting from Israel and the Middle East.

=== 1990s ===
- 1990: David A. Vise and Steve Coll, in Explanatory Journalism, for their stories on the Securities and Exchange Commission and its former chairman John Shad.
- 1991: Caryle Murphy, in International Reporting, for her coverage of the Iraqi invasion of Kuwait.
- 1991: Jim Hoagland, in Commentary, for his comments on the events leading up to the Gulf War and on "the political problems" of former Soviet Union leader Mikhail Gorbachev.
- 1993: David Maraniss, in National Reporting, for his examination of Bill Clinton's personal and political life.
- 1993: George Lardner, Jr., in Feature Writing, for reporting on his daughter's murder.
- 1993: Michael Dirda, in Criticism, for his book reviews.
- 1994: William Raspberry, in Commentary, for columns on social and political topics.
- 1995: Leon Dash and Lucian Perkins, in Explanatory Journalism, for profiling a Washington, D.C. family's struggle with crime, drug abuse, illiteracy, and poverty.
- 1995: Carol Guzy, in Spot News Photography, for her photographs amid political crisis during the 1994 U.S. intervention in reinstating Haitian president Jean-Bertrand Aristide to power.
- 1997: Tim Page, in Criticism, for music criticism.
- 1999: Staff of The Washington Post in Public Service, for reporting on police shootings by officers of the Metropolitan Police Department of the District of Columbia.

=== 2000s ===
- 2000: Staff of The Washington Post (notably the work of Katherine Boo), in Public Service, for stories that exposed abuse within group homes in Washington, D.C.
- 2000: Henry Allen, in Criticism, for "his fresh and authoritative writing on photography."
- 2000: Carol Guzy, Michael Williamson and Lucian Perkin, in Feature Photography, for photographs of Kosovo refugees during the Kosovo War.
- 2002: Sari Horwitz, Scott Higham, and Sarah Cohen, in Investigative Reporting, for a series that exposed the death of 229 children placed in protective care in Washington, D.C. between 1993 and 2000.
- 2002: Staff of The Washington Post, in National Reporting, for its coverage on the United States's War on terror.
- 2003: Kevin Sullivan and Mary Jordan, in International Reporting, for investigation of Mexico's criminal justice system.
- 2003: Colbert I. King, in Commentary, for columns on people in power.
- 2003: Stephen Hunter, in Criticism, for his writings on film.
- 2004: Anthony Shadid, in International Reporting, for his stories of Iraqi responses to the 2003 invasion of Iraq and Saddam Hussein's ouster from power.
- 2006: David Finkel, in Explanatory Reporting, for his stories on the United States government's attempt to bring democracy to Yemen.
- 2006: Dana Priest, in Beat Reporting, for her coverage of secret black sites and the other "controversial features" of the U.S. government's counterterrorism campaign.
- 2006: Susan Schmidt, James V. Grimaldi and R. Jeffrey Smith, in Investigative Reporting, for investigation into Washington lobbyist Jack Abramoff.
- 2006: Robin Givhan, in Criticism, for writings on fashion and culture.
- 2008: Staff of The Washington Post (notably the work of Dana Priest, Anne Hull, and Michel du Cille), in Public Service, for its investigation into mistreatment of wounded veterans at Walter Reed Hospital.
- 2008: Staff of The Washington Post, in Breaking News Reporting, for coverage of the Virginia Tech shooting.
- 2008: Jo Becker and Barton Gellman, in National Reporting, for its coverage of Vice President Dick Cheney and his influence on national policy.
- 2008: Gene Weingarten, in Feature Writing, for his story about Joshua Bell's performance at a subway station in Washington, D.C.
- 2008: Steve Fainaru, in International Reporting, for his series on private security contractors operating in Iraq.
- 2008: Steven Pearlstein, in Commentary, for his columns on the economy.
- 2009: Eugene Robinson, in Commentary, for his columns about the 2008 presidential campaign, including coverage of Barack Obama's bid.

=== 2010s ===
- 2010: Sarah Kaufman, in Criticism, for her dance criticism.
- 2010: Kathleen Parker, in Commentary, for columns on political and moral issues.
- 2010: Gene Weingarten, in Feature Writing, for a story about parents who leave their children in cars.
- 2010: Anthony Shadid, in International Reporting, for coverage of the United States' withdrawal from Iraq and its consequences.
- 2011: Carol Guzy, Nikki Kahn, and Ricky Carioti, in Breaking News Photography, for their photographs of the aftermath of the 2010 Haiti earthquake.
- 2013: Philip Kennicott, in Criticism, for his writings on art and "the social forces that underlie it."
- 2014: Staff of The Washington Post, in Public Service, for its revelation of widespread secret surveillance by the National Security Agency.
- 2014: Eli Slaslow, in Explanatory Reporting, for his series on food stamps in post-recession America.
- 2015: Carol D. Leonnig, in National Reporting, for her coverage of security lapses within the U.S. Secret Service.
- 2016: Staff of The Washington Post, in National Reporting, for tracking and reporting on police shootings across the United States.
- 2017: David A. Fahrenthold, in National Reporting, for his coverage of Donald Trump's claims of charitable giving and the Trump Foundation.
- 2018: Staff of The Washington Post, in Investigative Reporting, for its investigation into sexual assault allegations against Alabama judge and U.S. Senate candidate Roy Moore and an operation by Project Veritas to discredit the newspaper's findings.
- 2018: Staff of The Washington Post, in National Reporting, for coverage of Russian interference in the 2016 United States elections and its connection to then-president Donald J. Trump and his staff. (Received jointly with The New York Times.)
- 2019: Carlos Lozada, in Criticism, for his reviews and essays on books focused on government and "the American experience."
- 2019: Lorenzo Tugnoli, in Feature Photography, for photos from Yemen's ongoing famine.
- 2019: Darrin Bell, of The Washington Post News Service & Syndicate, in Editorial Cartooning, for cartoons focused on issues affecting disenfranchised communities and challenging the Trump administration.

=== 2020s ===
- 2020: Staff of The Washington Post, in Explanatory Reporting, for a series that showed the effects of extreme temperatures on the planet.
- 2022: Staff of The Washington Post, in Public Service, for its coverage of the events surrounding the 2021 United States Capitol attack.
- 2026: Staff of The Washington Post, in Public Service, for coverage of the Department of Government Efficiency and federal mass layoffs.
- 2026: Jahi Chikwendiu, in Feature Photography, for his photo essay on a young family welcoming the birth of their first child as the father is slowly dying from cancer.

== Controversies ==
=== 1980 Fabricated story scandal ===
In 1981, Janet Cooke, a staff writer on the Post's "Weeklies" section, received the Pulitzer Prize in Feature Writing for her story, "Jimmy's World," a profile of an eight-year-old heroin addict in Washington, D.C. The Post later returned the award when the newspaper revealed the story had been fabricated. The Pulitzer Board awarded the prize to Teresa Carpenter of The Village Voice.
