= 2000 Pulitzer Prize =

Awards for journalism and related fields

The Pulitzer Prizes for 2000 were announced on April 10, 2000.

== Journalism awards ==
- Public Service:
  - The Washington Post, notably for the work of Katherine Boo that disclosed wretched neglect and abuse in the city's group homes for the intellectually disabled, which forced officials to acknowledge the conditions and begin reforms.
- Breaking News Reporting:
  - Staff of The Denver Post, for its clear and balanced coverage of the student massacre at Columbine High School.
- Investigative Reporting:
  - Sang-Hun Choe, Charles J. Hanley and Martha Mendoza of the Associated Press, for revealing, with extensive documentation, the decades-old secret of how American soldiers early in the Korean War killed hundreds of Korean civilians in a massacre at the No Gun Ri Bridge.
- Explanatory Reporting:
  - Eric Newhouse of the Great Falls Tribune, for his vivid examination of alcohol abuse and the problems it creates in the community.
- Beat Reporting:
  - George Dohrmann of the St. Paul Pioneer Press, for his determined reporting, despite negative reader reaction, that revealed academic fraud in the men's basketball program at the University of Minnesota.
- National Reporting:
  - Staff of The Wall Street Journal, for its revealing stories that question U.S. defense spending and military deployment in the post–Cold War era and offer alternatives for the future.
- International Reporting:
  - Mark Schoofs of The Village Voice, for his provocative and enlightening series on the AIDS crisis in Africa.
- Feature Writing:
  - J.R. Moehringer of the Los Angeles Times, for his portrait of Gee's Bend, an isolated river community in Alabama where many descendants of slaves live, and how a proposed ferry to the mainland might change it.
- Commentary:
  - Paul A. Gigot of The Wall Street Journal, for his informative and insightful columns on politics and government.
- Criticism:
  - Henry Allen of The Washington Post, for his fresh and authoritative writing on photography.
- Editorial Writing:
  - John C. Bersia of the Orlando Sentinel, for his passionate editorial campaign attacking predatory lending practices in the state, which prompted changes in local lending regulations.
- Editorial Cartooning:
  - Joel Pett of the Lexington Herald-Leader
- Breaking News Photography:
  - Photo Staff of the Denver Rocky Mountain News, for its powerful collection of emotional images taken after the student shootings at Columbine High School.
- Feature Photography:
  - Carol Guzy, Michael Williamson and Lucian Perkins of The Washington Post, for their intimate and poignant images depicting the plight of the Kosovo refugees.

== Letters awards ==
- Fiction:
  - Interpreter of Maladies by Jhumpa Lahiri (Mariner Books/Houghton Mifflin)
- History:
  - Freedom From Fear: The American People in Depression and War, 1929-1945 by David M. Kennedy (Oxford University Press)
- Biography or Autobiography:
  - Vera (Mrs. Vladimir Nabokov) by Stacy Schiff (Random House)
- Poetry:
  - Repair by C.K. Williams (Farrar)
- General Nonfiction
  - Embracing Defeat: Japan in the Wake of World War II by John W. Dower (W.W. Norton & Company)

== Arts awards ==
- Drama:
  - Dinner With Friends by Donald Margulies (TCG)
- Music:
  - Life is a Dream, Opera in Three Acts: Act II, Concert Version by Lewis Spratlan (G. Schirmer/AMP); premiered on January 28, 2000, by Dinosaur Annex in Amherst, Massachusetts. Libretto by James Maraniss.
