= The Ghost of Tom Joad =

Studio album by Bruce Springsteen
- Released: November 21, 1995
- Recorded: March–September 1995
- Studios: Thrill Hill Recording, Colts Neck, New Jersey
- Genres: folk rock; Folk
- Length: 50:16
- Label: Columbia
- Producers: Bruce Springsteen; Chuck Plotkin

Bruce Springsteen chronology
Greatest Hits (1995)	The Ghost of Tom Joad (1995)	Blood Brothers (1996)

Singles from The Ghost of Tom Joad
- 1. "The Ghost of Tom Joad" Released: November 21, 1995

The Ghost of Tom Joad is the eleventh studio album by American singer-songwriter Bruce Springsteen, released on November 21, 1995, by Columbia Records. His second primarily acoustic album after Nebraska (1982), The Ghost of Tom Joad reached the top ten in two countries, and the top twenty in five more, including No. 11 in the United States. It was his first studio album to fail to reach the top ten in the US in over two decades. The album won the Grammy Award for Best Contemporary Folk Album.

== Composition ==
Springsteen wrote and recorded the album between March and September, 1995, at Thrill Hill West, his home studio in Los Angeles, California. Following that year's studio reunion with the E Street Band and the release of Greatest Hits, Springsteen's writing activity had increased significantly, resulting in this album, which consists of seven solo tracks and five band tracks.

Most tracks are backed by acoustic guitar work and the lyrics are generally a somber reflection of life in the mid-1990s in America and Mexico. The character of Tom Joad entered the American consciousness in John Steinbeck’s 1939 Pulitzer Prize-winning novel, The Grapes of Wrath, set against the economic hardships of the Great Depression. This spawned a film version starring Henry Fonda, which in turn inspired folk singer Woody Guthrie to pen "The Ballad of Tom Joad".

Springsteen was also influenced by Dale Maharidge and Michael Williamson's 1985 study of homelessness, Journey to Nowhere: The Saga of the New Underclass. The album's release was followed by Springsteen's solo acoustic Ghost of Tom Joad Tour, which ran from 1995 to 1997 and took place in mostly small venues.

== Release ==
The Ghost of Tom Joad debuted at number eleven on the US Billboard 200 chart, with 107,000 copies sold in its first week. However, it broke a string of eight consecutive Top 5 studio albums in the United States for Springsteen. The album won the 1997 Grammy Award for Best Contemporary Folk Album.

== Critical reception ==
Professional ratings
Review scores
Source	Rating
AllMusic	3/5 stars
Entertainment Weekly	B−
The Guardian	4/5 stars
Houston Chronicle	4/5 stars
Los Angeles Times	4/4 stars
NME	9/10
Pitchfork	7.6/10
Q	4/5 stars
Rolling Stone	3/5 stars
USA Today	3.5/4 stars

The Ghost of Tom Joad received mostly favorable reviews, but also drew some criticism. Mikal Gilmore of Rolling Stone called it "Springsteen's best album in ten years," and considered it "among the bravest work that anyone has given us this decade." He characterised it as Springsteen's "first overtly social statement since Born in the U.S.A.", and as having "an obvious kinship with Springsteen’s 1982 masterwork, Nebraska", the artist's first acoustic album. Bill Wyman of The Chicago Reader expressed disappointment that "Springsteen can be so literal that it's hard to appreciate some of the record's subtleties." He criticized the album for being "stolidly depoppified to ensure that no one will derive actual pleasure from it."

In The Village Voice's annual Pazz & Jop critics poll for the year's best albums, The Ghost of Tom Joad placed at No. 8. Robert Christgau, the poll's creator, simultaneously commended and criticized the album for being "the most courageous and the most depressing of the year," pointing out that Springsteen was the only artist in the poll's Top 40 "to directly address the war on the poor (and, increasingly, what is called the middle class) that is now the political agenda of the industrialized world." He also took aim at what he said was Springsteen's choice "to muffle his songs, so that only those who really want to hear their despair will bother trying." Christgau lamented that the "tunes, arrangements, and mysteriously praised 'phrasing' aren’t just forbiddingly minimal — often they’re rather careless", and dubbed the album "a bore". Some retrospective criticism has ranked it as among Springsteen's finest albums.

== Track listing ==
All songs are written by Bruce Springsteen.

No.	Title	Length
1.	"The Ghost of Tom Joad"	4:23
2.	"Straight Time"	3:25
3.	"Highway 29"	3:39
4.	"Youngstown"	3:52
5.	"Sinaloa Cowboys"	3:51
6.	"The Line"	5:14
7.	"Balboa Park"	3:19
8.	"Dry Lightning"	3:30
9.	"The New Timer"	5:45
10.	"Across the Border"	5:24
11.	"Galveston Bay"	5:04
12.	"My Best Was Never Good Enough"	2:00

=== Outtakes ===
Twelve of the songs recorded during the album's sessions made the final cut while "Dead Man Walkin'" was released on the soundtrack for the movie Dead Man Walking and later on The Essential Bruce Springsteen and "Brothers Under the Bridge" was released on Tracks.

A number of songs recorded during these sessions were released as part of 2025's Tracks II: The Lost Albums. These included the 'lost album' "Somewhere North of Nashville", revealed to have been recorded at the same time as 'The Ghost of Tom Joad', including previously known tracks such as 'Tiger Rose'. The collection also includes songs like "The Little Things", known to have been recorded again for 'Joad'. Others such as "Idiot's Delight" and "I'm Not Sleeping" were also performed live and along with "1945" and "Cheap Motel" were co-written with Joe Grushecky, who recorded the four songs for his 1997 album Coming Home.

- "Cynthia"
- "Tiger Rose"
- "I'm Turning Into Elvis"
- "It's the Little Things That Count"
- "Repo Man"
- "Poor Side of Town"
- "Delivery Man"
- "Silver Mountain"
- "Detail Man"
- "Janey Don't You Lose Heart"
- "You're Gonna Miss Me When I'm Gone"
- "Stand on It"
- "Blue Highway"
- "Somewhere North of Nashville"
- "Long Time Comin'"
- "All the Way Home"

==== Full Band Songs Written With Joe Grushecky ====
- "Idiot's Delight"
- "I'm Not Sleeping"
- "1945"
- "Cheap Motel"

== Personnel ==
Credits as listed in the album liner notes.

Musicians

- Bruce Springsteen – vocal, guitar (tracks 1–12), harmonica (tracks 1, 10), keyboard (tracks 3, 5–7, 11, 12)
- Danny Federici – keyboard (tracks 1, 2, 8, 10), accordion (track 10)
- Chuck Plotkin – keyboard (track 4)
- Gary Mallaber – drums (tracks 1, 2, 4, 8, 10), percussion (tracks 2, 4)
- Marty Rifkin – pedal steel guitar (tracks 1, 2, 4, 10)
- Garry Tallent – bass (tracks 1, 8)
- Jim Hanson – bass (tracks 2, 4)
- Jennifer Condos – bass (track 10)
- Soozie Tyrell – violin (tracks 2, 4, 8, 10), backing vocal (track 10)
- Lisa Lowell – backing vocal (track 10)
- Patti Scialfa – backing vocal (track 10)

Technical

- Bruce Springsteen, Chuck Plotkin – production
- Toby Scott – engineering and mixing
- Greg Goldman – engineering assistant
- Gary Myerberg – technical maintenance
- Shari Sutcliff – musician contracts
- Terry Magovern – research
- Sandra Choron – art direction
- Harry Choron – art production
- Eric Dinyer – cover art
- Pam Springsteen – interior photographs

== Charts ==
=== Weekly charts ===
Weekly chart performance for The Ghost of Tom Joad
Chart (1995–1996)	Peak position
Australian Albums (ARIA)	27
Austrian Albums (Ö3 Austria)	13
Belgian Albums (Ultratop Flanders)	14
Danish Albums (Hitlisten)	1
Dutch Albums (Album Top 100)	17
Finnish Albums (Suomen virallinen lista)	7
German Albums (Offizielle Top 100)	22
Italian Albums (FIMI)	1
New Zealand Albums (RMNZ)	47
Norwegian Albums (VG-lista)	4
Scottish Albums (Official Charts)	28
Spanish Albums (AFYVE)	3
Swedish Albums (Sverigetopplistan)	3
Swiss Albums (Schweizer Hitparade)	8
UK Albums (Official Charts)	16
US Billboard 200	11
Canada Top Albums/CDs (RPM)	15
European Albums (Eurotipsheet)	4

=== Year-end charts ===
Year-end chart performance for The Ghost of Tom Joad
Chart	Position
German Albums (Offizielle Top 100, 1996)	85
UK Albums (OCC, 1995)	90
US Billboard 200 (1996)	132

== Certifications and sales ==
Certifications and sales for The Ghost of Tom Joad
Region	Certification	Certified units/sales
Australia (ARIA)	Gold	35,000^{^}
Austria (IFPI Austria)	Gold	25,000^{*}
Brazil (Pro-Música Brasil)	Gold	100,000^{*}
Canada (Music Canada)	Gold	50,000^{^}
France (SNEP)	Gold	100,000^{*}
Italy	—	200,000
Norway (IFPI Norway)	Gold	25,000^{*}
Spain (Promusicae)	Platinum	100,000^{^}
United Kingdom (BPI)	Gold	100,000^{^}
United States (RIAA)	Gold	500,000^{^}
Summaries
Europe (IFPI)	Platinum	1,000,000^{*}
^{*} Sales figures based on certification alone.^{^} Shipments figures based on certification alone.
