= Let Us Now Praise Famous Men =

American book with text by James Agee and photographs by Walker Evans

First edition (publ. Houghton Mifflin)

Let us now Praise Famous Men is a book with text by American writer James Agee and photographs by American photographer Walker Evans, first published in 1941 in the United States. The work documents the lives of impoverished tenant farmers during the Great Depression. Although it is in keeping with Evans's work with the Farm Security Administration, the project was initiated not by the FSA, but by Fortune magazine. The title derives from a passage in the Wisdom of Sirach (44:1) that begins, "Let us now praise famous men, and our fathers that begat us."

== Background ==
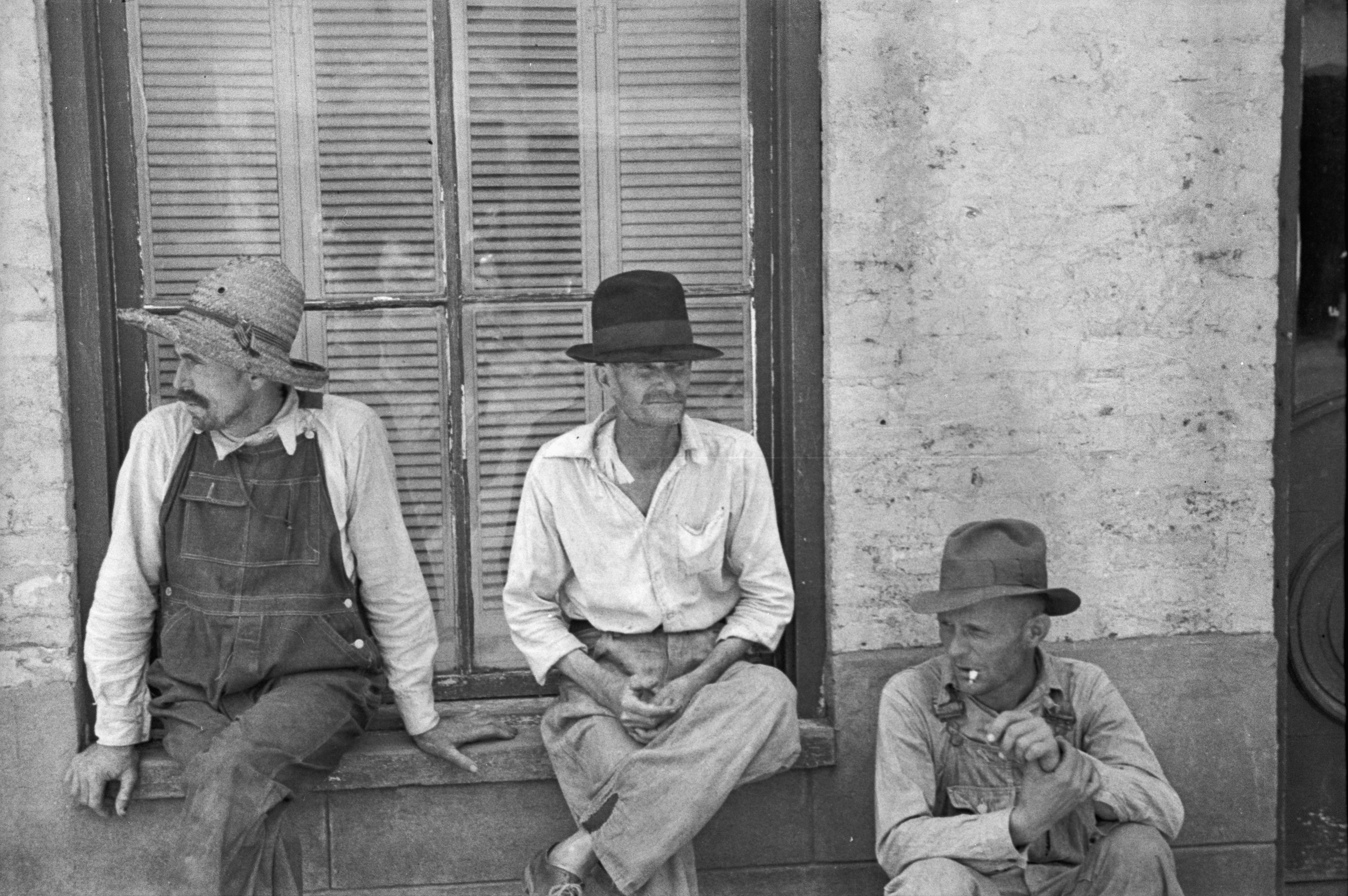
Walker Evans photograph of three sharecroppers, Frank Tengle, Bud Fields, and Floyd Burroughs, Alabama, summer 1936

Let Us Now Praise Famous Men grew out of an assignment that Agee and Evans accepted in 1936 to produce a Fortune article on the conditions among sharecropper families in the American South during the Great Depression. It was the time of U.S. President Franklin Roosevelt's "New Deal" programs designed to help the poorest segments of the society. Agee and Evans spent eight weeks that summer researching their assignment, mainly among three white sharecropping families mired in desperate poverty. They returned with Evans's portfolio of stark images—of families with gaunt faces, adults and children huddled in bare shacks before dusty yards in the Depression-era nowhere of the deep south—and Agee's detailed notes. His piece was rejected by the editors at Fortune; but the following year the magazine gave Agee permission to publish his Alabama research in a book. The manuscript was accepted for publication by Houghton Mifflin in 1939 and appeared two years later.

As he writes in the book's preface, the original assignment was to produce a "photographic and verbal record of the daily living and environment of an average white family of tenant farmers". However, as the Literary Encyclopedia points out, "Agee ultimately conceived of the project as a work of several volumes to be entitled Three Tenant Families, though only the first volume, Let Us Now Praise Famous Men, was ever written". Agee considered that the larger work, though based in journalism, would be "an independent inquiry into certain normal predicaments of human divinity".

== Agee as a character ==
Agee, who writes modestly and self-consciously about his privileged position in the book's creation, appears as a character himself at times in the narrative, as when he agonizes over his role as "spy" and intruder into these humble lives. At other times, as when he simply lists the contents of a sharecropper's shack or the meager articles of clothing they have to wear on Sunday, he is altogether absent. The strange ordering of books and chapters, the titles that range from mundane ("Clothes") to "radically artistic" (as the New York Times put it), the direct appeals by Agee for the reader to see the humanity and grandeur of these horrible lives, and his suffering at the thought that he cannot accomplish his appointed task, or should not, for the additional suffering it inflicts on his subjects, are all part of the book's character.

== Impact ==
Scholars have noted that the book's ambitious scale and rejection of traditional reporting runs parallel with the creative, non-traditional programs of the U.S. government under Roosevelt. Agee argues with literary, political, and moral traditions that might mean nothing to his subjects but which are important for the larger audience and the larger context of examining others' lives.

Let Us Now Praise Famous Men sold only half its press run following publication, but since then has won high praise over the years and is routinely studied in the U.S. as a source of both journalistic and literary innovation. Reading the book inspired composer Aaron Copland to write his opera, The Tender Land. David Simon, journalist and creator of the television series The Wire, credited the book with impacting him early in his career and informing his practice of journalism. The book became U.S. President Jimmy Carter's favorite, after the Bible.

== Pseudonyms ==
Throughout the book, Agee and Evans use pseudonyms to obscure the identity of the three tenant farmer families. Pseudonyms are again used in the 1989 follow-up book by Dale Maharidge and Michael Williamson, And Their Children After Them: The Legacy of "Let us now praise famous men" : James Agee, Walker Evans, and the Rise and Fall of Cotton in the South. The original copies of Walker Evans's photos that are archived in the Library of Congress American Memory Project, however, relate the original names of the photographic subjects.

Pseudonym	Actual Name
Gudger Family
George Gudger	Floyd Burroughs
Annie Mae (Woods) Gudger	Allie Mae Burroughs
George Gudger Jr.	Floyd Burroughs Jr.
Maggie Louise Gudger	Lucille Burroughs
Burt Westly Gudger	Charles Burroughs
Valley Few "Squinchy" Gudger	Othel Lee "Squeaky" Burroughs
Ricketts Family
Fred Garvrin Ricketts	Frank Tengle*
Sadie (Woods) Ricketts	Flora Bee Tengle
Margaret Ricketts	Elizabeth Tengle
Paralee Ricketts	Dora Mae Tengle
John Garvrin Ricketts	??? Tengle
Richard Ricketts	William Tengle (not confirmed)
Flora Merry Lee Ricketts	Laura Minnie Lee Tengle
Katy Ricketts	Ida Ruth Tengle
Clair Bell Ricketts	??? Tengle
Woods Family
Thomas Gallatin "Bud" Woods	Bud Fields
Ivy Woods	Lily Rogers Fields
Pearl Woods	??? Fields
Thomas Woods	William Fields
Ellen Woods	??? Fields
Others
T. Hudson Margraves	Watson Tidmore (not confirmed)

* There is disagreement over whether the family name is properly spelled Tengle or Tingle. The Library of Congress's spelling is used here.

Pseudonym	Actual Location
Hobe's Hill	Mills Hill
Cookstown	Moundville, Alabama
Centerboro, Alabama	Greensboro, Alabama
Cherokee City, Alabama	Tuscaloosa, Alabama

== Radio adaptation ==
In 1966 the Canadian Broadcasting Corporation aired the 135-minute dramatic feature, Let Us Now Praise Famous Men, George Whalley's adaptation of the book. The broadcast was produced by John Reeves, who has written about the radio production.

== See also ==
- They Live on the Land
