= Every Campus a Refuge =

American refugee aid organization

- Formation: September 2015; 10 years ago
- Type: Refugee aid organization
- Purpose: Mobilize colleges and universities to host refugees on campus grounds and support them in their resettlement
- Headquarters: Guilford College
- Location: Greensboro, North Carolina, U.S.
- Founder, Director, President: Diya Abdo
- Website: everycampusarefuge.net

Every Campus A Refuge (ECAR) is an American refugee aid organization. It was founded by Diya Abdo, who is the Lincoln Financial Professor of English at Guilford College, in September 2015.

ECAR was inspired by Pope Francis' call on every parish to take in refugees, and animated by Guilford's history and Quaker testimonies. Every Campus A Refuge is based on the idea that university and college campuses have everything necessary to host refugees like housing, food, care, and skills to support them as they begin their lives in their new homes. Like the Pope's call on every parish to host one refugee family, ECAR calls on every college and university in the world to partner with their local refugee resettlement agencies to house refugees on campus grounds and assist them in resettlement.

ECAR has expanded to other campuses beyond Guilford College, which are partnering with their local refugee resettlement agencies to host refugees, including Wake Forest University, Purdue University, Agnes Scott College, Lafayette College, and James Madison University, among others. Since its inception, 22 campuses have joined, with 19 campuses actively hosting refugees on their campuses.

== Mission ==
ECAR Mission Mobilize colleges and universities to host refugees on campus grounds and support them in their resettlement.

ECAR Vision Transform the landscape of refugee resettlement and higher education by creating thousands of sustainable resettlement campus ecosystems.

== Activities ==
=== Guilford College ===
Since January 2016, Guilford College has hosted 53 refugees (clients of Church World Service [CWS]) in campus houses and apartments; 26 of them have been children between the ages of 10 months and 17 years. The already-hosted refugees include two Syrian families that have successfully settled in Greensboro. Additionally, the campus has hosted refugees from Iraq, Sudan, Uganda, Rwanda, and the DRC.

In fall 2017, the 16-credit ECAR minor piloted at Guilford College. The ECAR minor includes two mandatory classes worth two credits each. These courses will allow students to receive training from refugee resettlement agencies and volunteer for 40 hours with recently resettled families. Also, students participate in 10–15 hours of online conversations with Syrian refugees and study topics related to forced displacement and immigration. Along with the two required classes, students also choose one course on causes of forced displacement, one on voices and perspectives of immigrants and refugees, and one on community organizing and advocacy.

Guilford College has dedicated a campus house to ECAR; the program hosts a refugee family, which arrives through CWS every semester.

==== Program ====
Under this program, each refugee family is temporarily housed on campus grounds until they can resettle successfully in Greensboro. They are provided with free housing, utilities, Wi-Fi, use of college facilities and resources, and a large community of support in the form of the college campus and its friends. The daily work of hosting and assisting in resettlement is assigned by CWS, managed and overseen by the CWS case manager, and the ECAR program coordinator, and carried out by over 100 Guilford community volunteers who are trained and background checked by CWS. These volunteers include Guilford students, alumni, faculty, administrators and staff; their spouses; faculty, student, and staff from nearby Bennett College; also local faith communities. New Arrivals Institute also trains the volunteers to provide ESL instruction to the hosted refugees.

== Chapters ==
There are many other institutions that are in various stages of mobilizing to become ECAR chapters. Princeton University, Brandeis University, Georgetown University, and the University of Maryland are also moving to become ECAR campuses.

ECAR also works with a number of resettlement campuses – universities which partner with local refugee resettlement agencies to host refugees on campus grounds and support their successful integration. Collectively, ECAR chapters have hosted dozens of refugee families from around the world, with the flagship Guilford College chapter hosting more than 80 as of spring 2022.

=== Active chapters ===
As of May 2025, ECAR has 19 active chapters:

- Guilford College (Greensboro, NC) — flagship campus
- Abilene Christian University (Abilene, TX)
- Agnes Scott College (Decatur, GA)
- Clemson University (Clemson, SC)
- Hartwick College (Oneonta, NY)
- Hudson Valley Community College (Troy, NY)
- James Madison University (Harrisonburg, VA)
- Lafayette College (Easton, PA)
- Millersville University of Pennsylvania (Millersville, PA)
- Modesto Junior College (Modesto, CA)
- Notre Dame de Namur University (Belmont, CA)
- Oklahoma State University (Stillwater, OK)
- Old Dominion University (Norfolk, VA)
- Purdue University (West Lafayette, IN)
- Russell Sage College (Albany & Troy, NY)
- Siena College (Loudonville, NY)
- St. Ambrose University (Davenport, Iowa)
- Wake Forest University (Winston-Salem, NC)
- Washington State University (Pullman, WA)

=== Former chapters ===
- Denison University
- Northampton Community College
- Rollins College

== Recognition ==
The initiative was recognized at the White House in 2016, at the Sixth Annual President's Interfaith and Community Service Campus Challenge Gathering. It has been featured on NPR's All Things Considered, in The Washington Post, and the former State Department's Toolkit on how universities can help refugees. Every Campus a Refuge won the Gulf South Summit's 2017 Outstanding Service-Learning Collaboration in Higher Education Award, as well as the Washington Center's Civic Engagement in Higher Education Award for 2017. Guilford College and Every Campus A Refuge were invited to participate in the United Nations' Together Campaign and its Summit held on January 9, 2018. Along with nine other colleges and universities (from the U.S., the U.K., Brazil, Cyprus, Germany, and China), Guilford College signed the UN Together Campaign Action Charter pledging active support for refugees and migrants' safety and dignity.
