= And Their Children After Them =

And Their Children After Them may refer to:

- And Their Children After Them (Maharidge and Williamson book), 1989 book by Dale Maharidge and Michael Williamson
- And Their Children After Them (novel), 2018 novel by Nicolas Mathieu
  - And Their Children After Them (film), 2024 film adaptation of the same title
