= Homeland (Maharidge book) =

2004 book by Dale Maharidge and Michael Williamson

- Author: Dale Maharidge and Michael Williamson
- Subject: Politics in the United States
- Publisher: Seven Stories Press
- Publication date: July 2004
- Pages: 384

Homeland is a 2004 book Dale Maharidge and photographer Michael Williamson about American life after the September 11 attacks.
