= InterFoto =

InterFoto was the largest festival of professional photography in Russia, the Baltic States and CIS countries from 1994 to 2004. It was founded by two American photojournalists, Washington Post photographer and Pulitzer Prize winner Lucian Perkins and freelancer Bill Swersey, bringing together local, regional and international communities of photographers, photo editors, curators, and industry leaders to exchange ideas, inspire, educate, and provide career opportunities.

InterFoto, a Russian-American non-profit organization, was designed to foster the development and international exposure of Russian photography through the production of an annual InterFoto International festival for professional photographers in Moscow and the annual all-Russian contest Press Photo Russia.

The festival brought international photographers to Moscow to present their work and review local photographers' portfolios. Among those who participated: Josef Koudelka, Anthony Suau, Douglas Kirkland, Antonin Kratochvil, Mikhail Evstafiev, Lauren Greenfield, Donna Ferrato, Martin Parr, Michael "Nick" Nichols, Steve McCurry, Larry Towell, Pedro Meyer, Gerd Ludwig, William Klein, Gueorgui Pinkhassov, Micha Bar-Am, Letizia Bettaglia, Burt Glinn.

In addition to bringing foreign photographers to Russia to share the work and meet their Russian colleagues, the InterFoto festival served as a place for Russian photographers to meet international and local photo editors. Among the Russian and CIS photographers 'discovered' by Western editors at InterFoto festivals: Vladimir Syomin, Ljalja Kuznetsova, Igor Mukhin, Vladimir Velengurin, Andrey Chezhin, Vadim Gippenreiter.

Over the 10 years that the festival was held, InterFoto received funding from Canon as well as support from Nikon, Kodak, Fujifilm, Polaroid and other companies. The organization also received grants from the Soros Foundation, British Council and assistance from local organizations and media companies.
