= 2008 Pulitzer Prize =

Awards for journalism and related fields

The 2008 Pulitzer Prizes were announced on April 7, 2008, the 92nd annual awards.

The Washington Post won six awards, second only to the seven won by The New York Times in 2002. Three organizations were awarded prizes for the first time: Reuters, Investor's Business Daily and the Concord Monitor. No prize was given for editorial writing.

== Journalism ==
Public service	The Washington Post	" ... for the work of Dana Priest, Anne Hull and photographer Michel du Cille in exposing mistreatment of wounded veterans at Walter Reed Hospital, evoking a national outcry and producing reforms by federal officials." Original series
Breaking news reporting	The Washington Post	" ... for its exceptional, multi-faceted coverage of the deadly shooting rampage at Virginia Tech, telling the developing story in print and online." Original series
Investigative reporting	Walt Bogdanich and Jake Hooker of The New York Times	" ... for their stories on toxic ingredients in medicine and other everyday products imported from China, leading to crackdowns by American and Chinese officials." Original series
Investigative reporting	Chicago Tribune	" ... for its exposure of faulty governmental regulation of toys, car seats and cribs, resulting in the extensive recall of hazardous products and congressional action to tighten supervision." Original series
Explanatory reporting	Amy Harmon of The New York Times	" ... for her striking examination of the dilemmas and ethical issues that accompany DNA testing, using human stories to sharpen her reports." Original series
Local reporting	David Umhoefer of the Milwaukee Journal Sentinel	" ... for his stories on the skirting of tax laws to pad pensions of county employees, prompting change and possible prosecution of key figures." Original article
National reporting	Jo Becker and Barton Gellman of The Washington Post	" ... for their lucid exploration of Vice President Dick Cheney and his powerful yet sometimes disguised influence on national policy." Original series
International reporting	Steve Fainaru of The Washington Post	" ... for his heavily reported series on private security contractors in Iraq that operate outside most of the laws governing American forces." Original series
Feature writing	Gene Weingarten of The Washington Post	" ... for his chronicling of a world-class violinist who, as an experiment, played beautiful music in a subway station filled with unheeding commuters." Original article
Commentary	Steve Pearlstein of The Washington Post	" ... for his insightful columns that explore the nation's complex economic ills with masterful clarity."
Criticism	Mark Feeney of The Boston Globe	" ... for his penetrating and versatile command of the visual arts, from film and photography to painting."
Editorial writing	No Award	
Editorial cartooning	Michael Ramirez of Investor's Business Daily	" ... for his provocative cartoons that rely on originality, humor and detailed artistry."
Breaking news photography	Adrees Latif of Reuters	" ... for his dramatic photograph of a Japanese videographer, sprawled on the pavement, fatally wounded during a street demonstration in Myanmar."
Feature photography	Preston Gannaway of the Concord Monitor	" ... for her intimate chronicle of a family coping with a parent's terminal illness." Original series

== Letters, Drama and Music Awards ==
Fiction	The Brief Wondrous Life of Oscar Wao by Junot Díaz (Riverhead Books)
Drama	August: Osage County by Tracy Letts (TCG)
History	What Hath God Wrought: The Transformation of America, 1815–1848 by Daniel Walker Howe (Oxford University Press)
Biography	Eden's Outcasts by John Matteson (W.W. Norton)
Poetry	Time and Materials by Robert Hass (Ecco/HarperCollins)
Poetry	Failure by Philip Schultz (Harcourt)
General Nonfiction	The Years of Extermination: Nazi Germany and the Jews, 1939-1945 by Saul Friedländer (HarperCollins)
Music	The Little Match Girl Passion by David Lang (G. Schirmer)

== Special Citation ==
- Bob Dylan received a special citation for "his profound impact on popular music and American culture, marked by lyrical compositions of extraordinary poetic power."
