= Gorgas, Alabama =

- Unincorporated community
- Location within Alabama Location within the United States
- Coordinates: 33°38′57″N 87°12′29″W
- Country: United States
- State: Alabama
- County: Tuscaloosa, Walker
- Elevation: 495 ft (151 m)
- Time zone: UTC-6 (Central (CST))
  - Summer (DST): UTC-5 (CDT)
- Area codes: 205, 659
- GNIS feature ID: 119178

Gorgas is a settlement in Walker and Tuscaloosa counties, Alabama, United States. It is named, via a former school in the area, after William Crawford Gorgas.

== Geography ==
Gorgas is located in northern Tuscaloosa and Walker counties. The boundaries of Gorgas were determined by the catchment area of the Gorgas High School.

== History ==
Originally the settlement had been known simply as "Camp Ground" after the local Bethel Camp Ground Methodist Church. A high school was created in the area named after William Crawford Gorgas c. 1916, and the settlement became known by the same name. The school closed in 1973.

In 1940 a study of the area commissioned by the Tennessee Valley Authority called They Live on The Land was published by sociologists Paul Terry and Verner Sims of the University of Alabama, though Gorgas was renamed the fictional moniker "Upland Bend" in their study. At the time of their study Gorgas consisted of 209 families, of whom 196 households were interviewed, 30 black and 166 white.

A post office operated under the name Gorgas from 1918 to 1971.

== Industry ==
Beginning from 1917, Gorgas was home to a steam plant for producing energy. The steam plant was owned by the Alabama Power Company. During the 1920s, the steam plant was the subject of a dispute between Alabama Power and Henry Ford, who sought control of a stake in the plant in order to power his development at Muscle Shoals, which Ford ultimately lost. The final Gorgas Coal-powered plant, located in Walker county, finally shut in 2019, more than a 100 years after the first coal-fired plant opened there. At the time of closing, it was Alabama's oldest coal-fired plant.

Beginning in 1947, coal mines in the area, in Walker county, also owned by Alabama Power were the site of the first experiment in in-situ coal gasification in the United States, first using thermite as the ignition source, and then using electricity. The experiments were carried out in a partnership between Alabama Power and the US Bureau of Mines. The experiments continued for seven years until 1953, at which point the US Bureau of Mines withdrew its support for them after the US Congress withdrew funding. In total 6,000 tons of coal were combusted during up to 1953. The experiments succeeded in producing combustible synthetic gas. The experiments were reactivated after 1954, this time with hydrofracturing using a mixture of oil and sand, but finally discontinued in 1958 as uneconomical. The mines continued operation until the 1970s.
