= Youngstown (song) =

Song by Bruce Springsteen

from the album The Ghost of Tom Joad
- Released: November 21, 1995
- Recorded: April – June 1995 at Thrill Hill West in Los Angeles
- Genre: Folk rock
- Length: 3:57
- Label: Columbia
- Producers: Bruce Springsteen, Chuck Plotkin

"Youngstown" is a song by the American singer-songwriter Bruce Springsteen from his 1995 album The Ghost of Tom Joad. Although many of the songs on the album were performed by Springsteen solo, the lineup for "Youngstown" includes Soozie Tyrell on violin, Jim Hanson on bass, Gary Mallaber on drums, co-producer Chuck Plotkin on keyboards, and Marty Rifkin on pedal steel guitar. Covers of the song have also been released by Show Of Hands and Matthew Ryan, among others.

== History and themes ==
The song tells the tale of the rise and fall of Youngstown, Ohio, over several generations, from the discovery of iron ore nearby in 1803 through the decline of the steel industry in the area in the 1970s. The lyric tells its story in a style reminiscent of Bob Dylan's "With God on Our Side", evoking American history through several wars. It tells of how in the Civil War, Youngstown made the cannonballs that helped the Union prevail. Then the city built tanks and bombs to help win later wars, such as World War II. Finally, the boys of Youngstown went to fight the Korean War and the Vietnam War. Despite the town's history, when it became uneconomical to keep the steel mills in Youngstown going, they were shut down, thus doing "what Hitler couldn't do," to the devastation of the community.

The song's story unfolds as the narrative of one family's history as factory-workers in Youngstown. The narrator of the song himself is a Vietnam War veteran (continuing Springsteen's fixation with that war, also evident in songs such as "Born in the U.S.A.", "Lost in the Flood", and "Galveston Bay") and his father fought in World War II. Both also worked in the steel mills. The narrator had worked himself up to the job of scarfer, a difficult but low-paying job that entails torching the steel to remove imperfections. Although he describes the job as one "that would suit the devil well," it is enough to put food on the table, pay his debts and provide a sense of purpose. When the mill is shut down, he tells the owners that "Once I made you rich enough/Rich enough to forget my name." Finally, he prays that "the devil comes and takes me/To stand in the fiery furnace of hell." Towards the end of the song, the scope expands beyond Youngstown to other areas that were devastated by the decline of the steel industry, including the Monongahela Valley, Minnesota's Mesabi iron range and the coal mines of Appalachia.

The song is set to a sparse melody. Its simple chorus is:

Here in Youngstown
Here in Youngstown
My sweet Jenny, I'm sinkin' down
Here darlin' in Youngstown

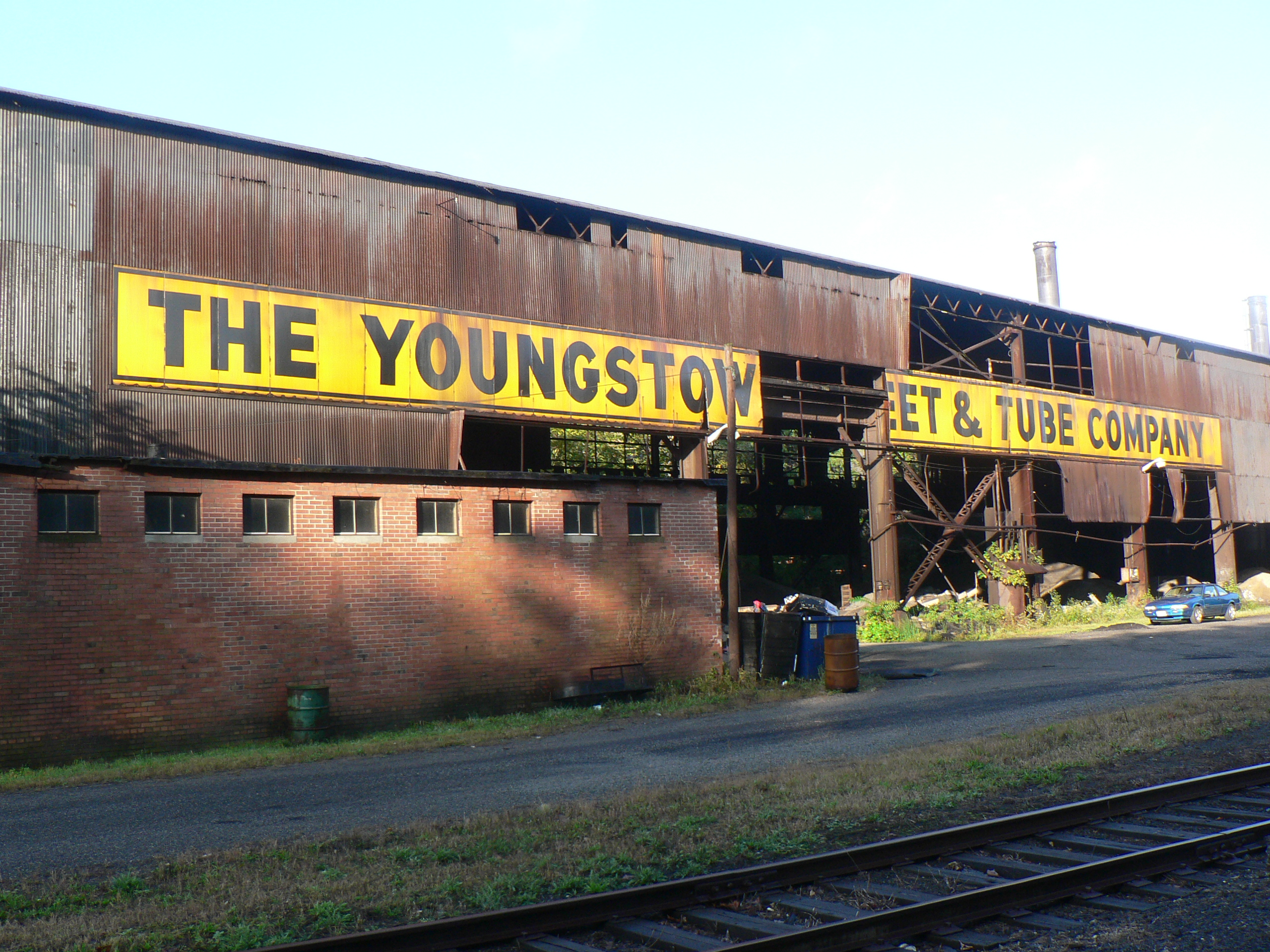
An abandoned facility of the Youngstown Sheet and Tube Company, owner of the Jeanette Blast Furnace, "Jenny" in the song

The Jenny mentioned in the chorus is possibly a woman but more importantly is the nickname of the Jeanette Blast Furnace, owned by Youngstown Sheet and Tube, which shut down in 1977. Its rusting hulk still stood along the Mahoning River and was visible for miles, constituting with others like it what one newspaper writer described as "the remains of a lost civilization."

Springsteen was inspired to write "Youngstown" and "The New Timer", another Ghost of Tom Joad song, after reading Dale Maharidge's 1985 book Journey to Nowhere: The Saga of the New Underclass, illustrated by Michael Williamson. Journey to Nowhere chronicled the story of middle class Americans who lost their jobs and had become hobos riding freight trains like in the Great Depression. The stories of dying steel towns inspired "Youngstown" and the stories of boxcar hobos inspired "New Timer". In an interview with BBC Radio, Springsteen stated that his connection to this song was "probably through my own kids and my own job, in the sense that the thought of being told after 30 years or so, that what you're doing isn't useful anymore, or has no place, or that the world has changed and that's the way it is. And you're 50 and gotta find something else to do. That's almost impossible ... I don't know what I would do in that circumstance." With "Youngstown", he managed to trace the rise of America as an industrial power, and the subsequent breaking of its social contract. This contrast between the mythology of the American Dream and the realities faced by its working-class citizens is among Springsteen's most familiar themes. Activist historian Howard Zinn included the lyrics of the song in his 2004 book, Voices of a People's History of the United States.

== Reception ==
Writing for The New York Times Magazine, author Nicholas Dawidoff said that "Youngstown" was the best song on the album and was an example of "best of his songs [which] have all the tension and complexity of great short fiction." Not everyone was taken with the song; The Dallas Morning News criticized its "ham-fisted factory/hell metaphor".

No singles were released from the album in the United States, but "Youngstown" was the song that Columbia Records most pitched to album oriented rock radio stations. The effort met with little success; one station program director sarcastically remarked, "Yeah, that'll get everybody up and dancing."

The song was popular in Youngstown itself, getting frequent local radio airplay and generating brisk sales of The Ghost of Tom Joad. An editor at The Youngstown Vindicator said that town reaction split into three camps: "Some people are taking this as, 'Yea Youngstown! Finally somebody noticed!' Some people are taking it as a real vindication of the working man. And some people feel, 'Oh no, we thought we had all this behind us!"

Springsteen made a point of playing Youngstown's Stambaugh Auditorium in January 1996 during the solo acoustic Ghost of Tom Joad Tour, and tickets for the 2,600-seat venue were sold in record time. During the visit he was given the key to the city by Mayor Patrick Ungaro. Springsteen introduced "Youngstown" at that show by saying, "This is about the men and women who lived in this town and who built this country. It's about [the people] who gave their sons and daughters to the wars that were fought ... and who were later declared expendable." He added that "You get into tricky territory when you write a song about someone's hometown. You don't want to get it wrong." The audience, which included many who worked in the mills or had family members who did, was hushed during the performance and then gave Springsteen a standing ovation after its completion. Afterward, Springsteen was relieved that the performance had gone over well and changed his travel plans to stay an extra day and visit historic sites in the area.

== Live performances ==
The reception to the Youngstown performance was not unique; whenever Springsteen played the song in the Midwest during the Ghost of Tom Joad Tour, audiences kept quite still.

Beyond that tour, "Youngstown" has been a prominent song in many of Springsteen's live concert performances. It was a featured song on the 1999–2000 Bruce Springsteen and the E Street Band Reunion Tour, starting a five-song sequence (that also included "Murder Incorporated", "Badlands", "Out in the Street" and "Tenth Avenue Freeze-Out") that anchored the middle of almost every show. Here it was heavily rearranged into a hard rock vehicle, with pounding drums from Max Weinberg and a fiery guitar solo from Nils Lofgren. In addition, Springsteen was illuminated from below by stage front red lighting. The New York Times said the reworking "howled with desolation" and the Miami New Times said that Lofgren's part almost stole the song. One such performance from that tour was included on the Bruce Springsteen & The E Street Band: Live in New York City CD and DVD in 2001. Greg Kot of Rolling Stone said of it that "Nils Lofgren's six-string rave-up drops a bomb on the relatively sedate studio version."

"Youngstown" was a regular during the opening stretch of Springsteen's 2005 solo acoustic Devils & Dust Tour, before being dropped from the setlist. It appeared a few times during the band's 2007–2008 Magic Tour. Then for 2009's Working on a Dream Tour, it was played more frequently, serving in a rotation spot with "The Ghost of Tom Joad" during those shows' song sequence devoted to the late-2000s recession. Both of those numbers delivered what Billboard magazine termed, in the "Youngstown" case, "the night's killer Nils Lofgren solo". A live performance from the Hard Rock Calling show on that tour was included on the 2010 DVD London Calling: Live in Hyde Park. Much of this arrangement is somewhat calmer than on the Reunion Tour, carried by Tyrell's violin and Charlie Giordano's accordion. The last two minutes are taken over by Lofgren's solo, which features several tempo changes and crescendos before culminating in the guitarist spinning in circles on the stage.

== Personnel ==
Credits from The Ghost of Tom Joad liner notes.

- Bruce Springsteen – vocal, guitar
- Jim Hanson – bass
- Chuck Plotkin – keyboard
- Gary Mallaber – drums, percussion
- Marty Rifkin – pedal steel guitar
- Soozie Tyrell – violin
