= Richard C. Richardson Jr. =

- Born: United States
- Occupations: Policy researcher, academic and author

Academic background
- Education: B.S., Education; M.A., Guidance and Counseling; PhD
- Alma mater: Castleton State College; Michigan State University; University of Texas

Academic work
- Institutions: New York University; Arizona State University

Richard C. Richardson Jr. is an American policy researcher, academic and author. He is an emeritus professor at New York University as well as Arizona State University.

Richardson is most known for his contributions to the fields of higher education quality and diversity, minority access and achievement, and the examination of state and federal policies impacting performance in these and related areas. Among his authored works are publications in academic journals, including Journal of Educational Research and Policy Studies and American Behavioral Scientist, as well as books such as Policy and Performance in American Higher Education: An Examination of Cases across State Systems and Designing State Higher Education Systems For a New Century. He is the recipient of 1988 and 1993 Researcher of the Year Awards from the College of Education at Arizona State University.

== Education ==
Richardson obtained a BS in Education from Castleton State College in 1954. In 1958, he completed his MA in Guidance and Counseling from Michigan State University, followed by his PhD from the University of Texas in 1963. He also holds an honorary doctor of letters degree from Lafayette College.

== Career ==
Richardson joined Vermont College for Women in 1958 as an instructor. From 1964 to 1967, he served first as dean of students and then dean of instruction at the Forest Park Campus of the Junior College District of St Louis. Between 1967 and 1978, he was the founding president of Northampton Community College in Bethlehem. In 1977, he was appointed professor at Arizona State University and Director of the Center for Higher and Adult Education. 1999, he became professor emeritus of educational leadership and policy studies at Arizona State University.

In 1999, Richardson became a visiting professor of higher education at New York University. In 2002 he was granted tenure as professor and subsequently named chair of the Department of Administration, Leadership, and Technology (2003–2008). From 1999 – 2007, he also directed the Ford-funded Alliance for International Higher Education Policy Studies. He was named professor emeritus at NYU in 2011.

== Research ==
Richardson has conducted research across themes including higher education access, diversity and equity. His research has been published in 8 books, 30 chapters, and more than 70 published research reports and journal articles.

In his literacy study, the results of which were presented in his 1983 book titled Literacy in the Open-Access College, Richardson explored the influence of Hispanic students on community colleges and the reciprocal impact of the college on Hispanic students. The findings suggested a decline in critical literacy attributed to prevailing policies and practices in community colleges and other open access higher education institutions during that era, a trend adversely affecting Chicano students. In a study, discussed in his book titled Fostering Minority Access and Achievement in Higher Education: The Role of Urban Community Colleges and Universities, he examined the relationship between urban community colleges and urban universities, including the challenges faced by community colleges in transferring students to universities and the lack of well-defined strategies for equalizing higher education opportunities.

Later, Richardson partnered with fellow researchers to help establish a national research center under the U.S. Department of Education. His research focused on policies and practices leading both to quality and success for underrepresented students in earning baccalaureate degrees from higher achieving universities. The project spanned two phases, developing propositions in the first phase and testing and elaborating the model in the second phase across ten states, a graphic depiction of which is presented in the book Achieving Quality and Diversity: Universities in a Multicultural Society. The findings highlighted the importance of simultaneously pursuing diversity and quality in higher education institutions and provided recommendations for achieving fair outcomes.

In research, Richardson investigated faculty behaviors in community colleges through a three-phase study, revealing that institutions with higher levels of effective faculty behaviors emphasized student achievement, involved faculty in decision-making, and invested in professional development, while those with lower rankings exhibited conflicting values and efforts to maintain faculty-administrative boundaries.

In 1992, Richardson served as consultant and researcher with a South African team at the University of the Witwatersrand in Johannesburg. The quality and diversity framework developed under his earlier studies in the U.S. was adapted to the South African setting. The intent was to identify outcomes during apartheid that could be traced to the efforts of U.S., Foundation support for improving opportunities for Black South Africans. Between 1994 and 1997, he consulted and conducted research with a team from the California Higher Education Policy Center that conducted case studies on seven state higher education systems, identifying governance structures and key work processes. The study revealed that system structure significantly influenced how higher education systems responded to public policy objectives, with federal and unified systems showing better responsiveness to state needs compared to segmented systems.

After joining NYU in 1999, Richardson directed the Ford Foundation funded Alliance for International Higher Education Policy Studies. Utilizing a grounded model and a conceptual framework, the study revealed converging strategies in the three nations influenced by globalization, and emphasizing themes like equal opportunity, accountability, market principles, labor force development, research, and globalization. The findings highlighted the importance of balancing federal, state, and institutional authority to effectively address evolving challenges in higher education systems.

== Awards and honors ==
- 1972 - Honorary Doctor of Letters, Lafayette College
- 1982 – Distinguished Service Award, Council of North Central Community Junior Colleges
- 1993 - Researcher of the Year, College of Education, Arizona State University
- 2002 - Building Named Richardson Hall, Northampton Community College
- 2023 - Advancement of Race Relations, The College of Liberal Arts and Sciences, Arizona State

== Bibliography ==
=== Books ===
- Literacy in the Open Access College (1983) ISBN 0-87589-569-7
- Fostering Minority Access and Achievement in Higher Education: The Role of Urban Community Colleges and Universities (1987) ISBN 9781555420536
- Achieving Quality and Diversity: Universities in a Multicultural Society (1991) ISBN 0-02-897342-9
- Designing State Higher Education Systems For A New Century (1998) ISBN 9781573561747
- Policy and Performance in American Higher Education: An Examination of Cases across State Systems (2009) ISBN 9780801891618

=== Selected articles ===
- Richardson Jr, R. C., & Gardner, D. E. (1985). Designing a Cost Effective Planning Process. Planning for Higher Education, 13(2), 10–13.
- Doucette, D. S., Richardson Jr, R. C., & Fenske, R. H. (1985). Defining institutional mission: Application of a research model. The Journal of Higher Education, 56(2), 189–205.
- Richardson Jr, R. C., Orkin, F. M., & Pavlich, G. C. (1996). Overcoming the effects of apartheid in South African universities. The Review of Higher Education, 19(3), 247–266.
- Bracco, K. R., Richardson, R. C., Callan, P. M., & Finney, J. E. (1999). Policy environments and system design: Understanding state governance structures. The Review of Higher Education, 23(1), 23–44.
- Martinez, M., & Richardson, R. C. (2003). A view of the market through studies of policy and governance. American Behavioral Scientist, 46(7), 883–901.
