= Life Is a Dream (opera) =

2010 opera by Lewis Spratlan

- by Lewis Spratlan
- Librettist: James Maraniss
- Based on: Life Is a Dream by Pedro Calderón de la Barca
- Premiere: 24 July 2010; Santa Fe Opera

Life is a Dream is a three-act opera with music by Lewis Spratlan from an English-language libretto by James Maraniss which was based on the 1635 play Life Is a Dream by Spanish playwright Pedro Calderón de la Barca. It was written in the 1970s, but did not receive a complete stage premiere until 2010.

== Development ==
Spratlan's collaboration with his librettist began in the 1970s while the two were friends and colleagues at Amherst College where Spratlan was a professor of music for 36 years and Maraniss was a professor of Spanish who greatly admired Calderon's play. Spratlan wrote the opera between 1975 and 1978 on a commission from the New Haven Opera Theatre, a company which closed in 1977. Spratlan's efforts to interest another company in staging the work failed until, in January 2000, he raised funds to finance two Concert performances of the opera's second act – "the second act is where most of the drama of the piece goes on," said the composer – by the Dinosaur Annex Music Ensemble, one at Amherst College and the other in Cambridge, Massachusetts at Harvard's Paine Hall, where the Boston Globe reviewer greeted it as "a strong piece that would prove compelling in a full production." "The concert," said a later report, "required a forty-six-piece orchestra, six singers and a chorus. A combined recording of both performances was made. Spratlan submitted it to the Pulitzer Prize board in March 2000, and to most everyone's surprise—especially Spratlan's—it won." The Pulitzer citation noted that Spratlan had "created a theatrical world in which the characters were given distinct musical thumbprints that were meant to embody their personalities, and in which the dissonances and angularities of contemporary styles were linked with traditional dance, march and madrigal forms."

In May 2002, New York City Opera presented another concert performance of the second act. There was still no interest in staging the work until early 2009 when Santa Fe Opera's general director Charles MacKay approached Spratlan to propose a 2010 staging.

The opera was given its world premiere at the Santa Fe Opera on 24 July 2010. John Cheek, who had appeared in the 2000 concerts, appeared in the premiere as well.

Spratlan has described the musical style he employed as "'pan-tonal', that is, mostly centered in certain keys or modes but fluid in moving among them" except for the use of twelve-tone technique to represent the rigidity of the character of Don Basilio. Each character is further differentiated:

The vocal style I think of as heightened speech, following closely the rhythms and contours of the text. Each character has a vocal "thumbprint." For some examples, the hero's music soars upward, only to fall a bit and resume its climb – Sisyphus pushing the bolder uphill. The king's music is marked by wide leaps, conveying pomposity and exaggeration. The music of Clarín, the jester, is staccato and very narrow in range; he is always announced and accompanied by the piccolo trumpet, a descendant of the namesake Baroque-era clarino. The opera's orchestration is many-hued and actively conveys the psychological environment at hand.

== Roles ==
Roles, voice types, premiere cast
Role	Voice type	Premiere cast, 24 July 2010 Conductor: Leonard Slatkin
Rosaura, Clotaldo's daughter	soprano	Ellie Dehn
Clarin, a jester	tenor	Keith Jameson
Segismundo, the Prince	tenor	Roger Honeywell
Clotaldo, a nobleman	baritone	James Maddalena
Astolfo, Basilio's nephew	baritone	Craig Verm
Estrella, Basilio's niece	mezzo-soprano	Carin Gilfry
King Basilio, Segismundo's father	bass-baritone	John Cheek
Second Servant, First Soldier	bass-baritone	Thomas Forde
First Servant	baritone	Darik Knutsen
Second Soldier	tenor	Heath Huberg
Soldiers, servants, ladies; Chorus

== Critical reactions ==
In his review of the premiere performance, critic James Keller of the Santa Fe New Mexican described the "impressive premiere" and noted one of the characteristics of the music of the period of composition which "sent opera-goers on a stroll down memory lane to the 1970s, when academic composers were still expected to worship at the altar of atonality." He continued:

but a score as beautiful as Spratlan's reminds us that even if one might not care to dine on atonality for breakfast, lunch and dinner every day, an occasional taste can be toothsome. From a musical standpoint, Life Is a Dream is an imposing accomplishment, the more so in light of the bland pablum that has so often been tendered in stage works of more recent vintage.

The New York Times music critic, Anthony Tommasini, gave the opera a positive review, writing:

...no question, Life Is a Dream is an important opera, the rare philosophical work that holds the stage and gives singing actors real characters to grapple with. The cast, crew and especially the elated Mr. Spratlan basked in the ovation.
