= Nikki Kahn =

Pulitzer Prize winning American documentary photographer and photo editor

- Born: Georgetown, Guyana
- Education: American University; Syracuse University
- Occupation: Photo Editor/ Photographer
- Employer: Sierra Magazine
- Spouse: Michel du Cille
- Awards: Pulitzer Prize

Nikki Kahn is a documentary photographer based in California. She won the Pulitzer Prize for Breaking News Photography in 2011.

== Biography and education ==
Nikki Kahn was born in Georgetown, Guyana. In 1996 she graduated from American University in Washington, D.C., with degrees in visual media and art history. She received a Master of Science degree in photography in 2004 from Syracuse University. During her time at Syracuse, she covered AIDS in Guyana. Kahn lived in Washington, D.C., for almost a decade with her husband, Michel du Cille, a three-time Pulitzer-Prize-winning photographer. Du Cille died from a heart attack in 2014 while covering the Ebola crisis in Liberia.

== Career ==
Before joining The Washington Post in 2005, Kahn worked for Knight-Ridder Tribune Photo Service in Washington, D.C., as a photographer and editor. Kahn has covered stories in Afghanistan, Haiti, India, Guyana, Egypt and Tunisia.

== Awards and exhibitions ==
In 2011, Kahn and her colleagues at The Washington Post, Carol Guzy and Ricky Carioti, won a Pulitzer Prize for Breaking News Photography "for their up-close portrait of grief and desperation after a catastrophic earthquake struck Haiti". Kahn has been back to Haiti many times since having shot the photos; she likes to keep in touch with those who touched her life. Kahn states, "I think the amazing thing was the opportunity to go back throughout the year and check up on the people I photographed on the first trip."

Kahn's work has been featured in group exhibitions by the White House News Photographers Association at the Newseum in Washington, D.C.
