= They Live on the Land =

1940 book by Paul Terry and Verner Sims

They Live on the Land: Life in an Open Country Southern Community
- Front cover (1993 reprint)
- Author: Paul W. Terry; Verner M. Sims
- Language: English
- Published: 1940
- Publication place: United States
- Media type: Print
- ISBN: 0-8173-0587-4
- Dewey Decimal: 307.72-dc20
- LC Class: HN79 .S85T47 1993 (reprint)

They Live on the Land: Life in an Open Country Southern Community is a social study of an Alabama rural community written by social scientists Paul W. Terry and Verner M. Sims and published in 1940. The book was based on research undertaken by Terry and Sims under the auspices of the Tennessee Valley Authority during the period 1934–1936. Terry and Sims were academic researchers in educational psychology based at the University of Alabama at the time.

== Summary ==
The book covers the origins, civic and economic activities, health and welfare, and religious, recreational, and educational lives of the people of a rural Alabama community that the authors called "Upland Bend". "Upland Bend" was a pseudonym for the Alabama community of Gorgas in Tuscaloosa County.

The book is based on interviews with 196 of the 209 families in Gorgas. The work highlighted racial discrimination in the community, as well as economic deprivation and social and political disaffection. The period in which the study took place overlapped with the Great Depression.

== Reception ==
Contemporary reviews were generally positive. A review in The High School Journal described it as a "socially valuable document" and stated that "you can feel the pulse of their [i.e., the people of Gorgas] lives after reading this report". A review in The Elementary School Journal described the book as "thorough and comprehensive throughout...no aspect of community life has been left neglected". Writing in The Ohio Valley Sociologist, Lloyd Allen Cook gave the book a mixed review, praising the depth of detail of the book but criticizing it for lacking a sense of the "unity of place".

Retrospective reviews of the book were also positive. Writing in 2004, Professor Wayne Flynt of Auburn University described the book as "a revealing snapshot of rural Alabama during the 1930s". A 1993 review of the Alabama Classics reprint of the book in The Anniston Star described the book as "a valuable case study that will serve as a permanent record" and as a "well-researched work". Writing the foreword to the 1993 re-print, Clarence L. Mohr compared the book to the seminal depression-era sociological work Let Us Now Praise Famous Men.
