= Igor Mukhin =

Soviet photographer

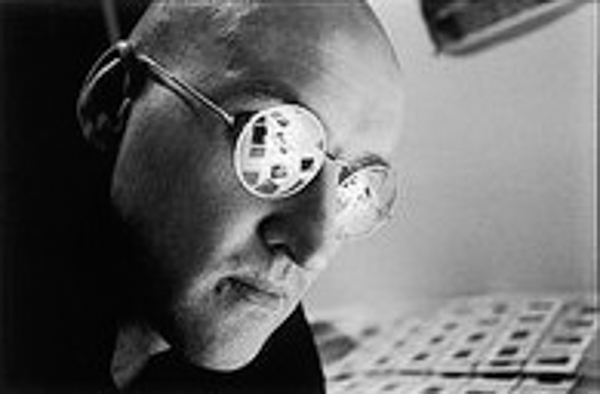
- Mukhin in Paris, 1999 year
- Born: Igor Vladimirovich Moukhin; 19 November 1961 (age 63); Moscow, Russian SFSR, Soviet Union
- Known for: Photography
- Website: igormukhin.com

Igor Vladimirovich Mukhin (Russian: И́горь Влади́мирович Му́хин; born 19 November 1961), also known as Igor Vladimirovich Moukhin, is a Russian photographer. He was a member of the In-Public street photography collective.

== Biography ==
After graduating from college, Mukhin worked in a project institute. From 1985 to 1986 he attended classes at the studio of prominent Moscow photographer, Alexander Lapin. He later spent several years working with samizdat rock musicians.

In 1987, Mukhin had his first personal exhibition at the Moscow State University. Since 1989 he has been working as an independent photographer.

Mukhin is known for his photographs of Soviet rock musicians of the perestroika period, including Viktor Tsoi, Boris Grebenshchikov, and Petr Mamonov. His projects have included The Soviet Monuments, The Soviet Bench, Fragments of Evident Propaganda, The Soviet Children's Playgrounds, Night Moscow, Girls, Moscow in Winter: Heavy Breath of Winter and The Province. The Nizhniy Novgorod vacation. Some of the photographs from these projects were shown at the Tretyakov gallery and La Maison Rouge in Paris in 2007. In the mid-1990s, Mukhin worked on documentary projects about Moscow and provincial Russia.

In 1996, he was a guest speaker at the international festival InterFoto in Moscow. In 1999, Mukhin received a grant from the Paris Mayor's office to work on a project titled "Lovers in Paris" sponsored by FNAC (Fonds national d'art contemporain) and the French Committee to commemorate the year 2000.

Mukhin usually uses rangefinder cameras including the Leica M6 and black and white film.

His work has been published in many Russian magazines and in foreign editions such as Rolling Stone, GEO, Elle, Vogue, Le Monde, Libération, Esquire, and Time among others.

In 2018 Mukhin became a member of the In-Public street photography collective.

== Publications ==
- Avoir 20 ans a Moscou. Paris: Editions Alternatives, 1998. ISBN 2-86227-170-5. Text by G. Saffrais.
- Igor Moukhine. Paris: Carre Noir; Moscow: Moscow House of Photography, 2000. Text by Olga Sviblova.
- Wien Вена Vienna = Константин Бохоров. Вена, Krinzinger Projekte, Vienna, 2004. Text by Peter Weiermair.
- Igor Moukhin. Colorado State University, Fort Collins, USA: Hatton Gallery, 2004. Text by A. D. Coleman.
- Рожденные в СССР = Born in the USSR. Moscow: L. Gusev, 2005. Text by Ekaterina Degot and Steve Yates. Edition of 2000 copies.
  - Second edition. 2016.
- My Moscow
  - My Moscow. Schilt Publishing, 2012.
  - Mein Moskau: Fotografien 1985–2010. Bern: Benteli, 2012. ISBN 978-3-7165-1722-2.
- 2012: Igor Moukhin. Photographies 1987–2011. Paris: Éditions Loco, 2012. ISBN 978-2-919507-12-2. Text by Christian Gattinoni and Bahia Allouache.

== Exhibitions ==
=== Solo exhibitions ===
- 1995 Vision of Russia. Naarden Fotofestival, Grote Kerk, Naarden, Netherlands.
- 1996 Life in the City. Latvian Museum of Photography, Riga, Latvia.
- 1997 Soviet Epoch: Benches and Monuments. Photohouse, Riga, Latvia.
- 1998 Moscou la Jenne. Bibliothèque Elsa-Triolet, Pantin, France.
- 1999 Igor Moukhin. Galerie Carre Noir, Paris, France.
- 2000 La jeunesse a Paris. (Mois de la photo a Paris 2000), Galerie Carre Noir, Paris.
- 2001 Москва Light. Moscow.
- 2002 Moscow. International Photography Festival, Pingyao, China.
- 2002 Moscou — Paris. Moscow House of Photography, Moscow, Russian Museum (2003).
- 2003 Moskauer Jugent im 3. Jahrtausent. Moskauer Tage in Berlin, Kulturbrauerei, Berlin.
- 2003 Contemporary Moscow Photography. Anahita Gallery, Santa Fe, USA.
- 2003 Wien – Moscow. Krinzinger Projekte, Vienna.
- 2004 I.Moukhin. Contemporary Russian Photography. The Camera Obskura Gallery, Denver, USA.
- 2004 I.Moukhin: Visions of Contemporary Russia. Hatton Gallery, Colorado State University, Fort Collins, USA.
- 2004 Generation next. Auditorium parco della musica. Festival Russo, Rome.
- 2008 Igor Moukhin, Stockholm International Fairs, Sweden.
- 2008 Igor Moukhin, CM ART, Paris
- 2012 La mia Mosca. Festival Fotografia Europea 2012. San Pietro Cloisters. Reggio Emilia, Italy.
- 2013 Rétrospective La Russie d'Igor Moukhin, photographies de 1987 à 2012. Grand Réservoir de L'Hôpital de Bicêtre, Le Kremlin-Bicètre. Festival RussenKo 2013, France.
- 2021 Génération Underground, Polka Galerie, Paris, France.
- 2022 Generations, From the USSR to the New Russia, House of Photography Robert Doisneau, Paris, France.

=== Group exhibitions ===
- 1991: Changing Reality. Corcoran Gallery of Art, Washington D. C.
- 1997: From the collection. Maison Européenne de la Photographie, Paris.
- 1998: Photography from the collection. Museum of Modern Art, New York.
- 1999: After the wall. Moderna Museet, Stockholm; Ludwig Museum, Budapest; National Galleries im Hamburger Bahnhof, Berlin.
- 2002: Давай! Russian Art now. Postfuhramt, Berlin; travelling MAK, Wien.
- 2002: Idea Photographic: After Modernism. New Mexico Museum of Art, New Mexico.
- 2007: Sots Art. Political Art in Russia from 1972 to today. Tretyakov Gallery Moscow, La Maison Rouge, Paris.
- 2010: The Original Copy: Photography of Sculpture, 1839 to Today. Museum of Modern Art.
- 2010: Photographie de la nouvelle Russie 1990–2010. Maison Européenne de la Photographie, Paris.

== Sources ==
- "Private – International review of photographs" No. 35 (winter 2006–07) Italy
- "Young at Heart" Alexander Osipovich "The Moscow Times", 19 August 2005
- "I.Moukhin". B. Text by A. D. Coleman. Hatton Gallery, CSU, Fort Collins, 2005
- Teri Thomson Randall. "Photos from Moscow Igor Moukhin". "Pasatiempo. The New Mexicans Weekly Magazine of Arts", 18–24 April 2003 г. p. 46–47
- Matthias Echterhagen. "Zwischen Hast und Stillstand". газета "Die Tageszeitung" 9 July 2003
- Olga Gourko. "The Desire to be Seen". "Aperture". USA, 2002, No. 167, p. 68–69
- Michel Guerrin. "Portraits de villes, portraits de soi". "Le Monde". 1999, 1 Mars
- "Russia in Focus" Howie Movshovitz,"The Denver Post" 11 August 1997
- Art Journal, 1994 Vol. 53 No. 2 USA
- "Spring Benches at the XL Gallery" Olga Listsova. "The Moscow Tribune" 1994
