= Anne Hull =

American journalist and writer (born 1961)

- Born: 1961 (age 64–65)
- Awards: Pulitzer Prize for Public Service (2008); Elijah Parish Lovejoy Award (2008)

Anne Hull (born 1961) is an American journalist and author. She was a national reporter at The Washington Post for nearly two decades. In 2008, the Post was awarded the Pulitzer Prize for Public Service, citing the work of Hull, reporter Dana Priest and photographer Michel du Cille for "exposing mistreatment of wounded veterans at Walter Reed Hospital, evoking a national outcry and producing reforms by federal officials".

Hull is the author of "Through the Groves: a Memoir", described as a "coming of age and coming out memoir" about growing up in conservative rural central Florida where her father worked in the citrus groves.

She has written for The New Yorker, The New York Times, The Washington Post Magazine, and River Teeth.

== Career ==
Hull started at the St. Petersburg Times (now Tampa Bay Times) in 1985. Her three-part series, "Metal to Bone," about a police unit assigned to a public housing project in Tampa, was awarded the American Society of Newspaper Editors Non-Deadline Writing Award in 1995. In 1999, Hull followed a group of women from central Mexico to work in a North Carolina crab processing facility. The series, "Una Vida Mejor," was a 2000 Pulitzer Prize finalist in national reporting and feature writing.

Hull joined The Washington Post in 2000 as an enterprise reporter on the national staff. She wrote about low-wage workers in fast food and chicken processing plants, rural voters, immigration in the American South, LGBT teenagers coming out in the Bible Belt and Newark, and soldiers returning from the war in Iraq.

She is the author of "Through the Groves: A Memoir", published by Macmillan / Holt in 2023.

== Walter Reed scandal ==
In late 2007, Hull and fellow Post reporter Dana Priest and photographer Michel du Cille went behind the gates at Walter Reed Army Medical Center in Washington to investigate the living conditions of wounded soldiers from the wars in Iraq and Afghanistan. They found mold, rats and the neglect of outpatient soldiers who were stuck in bureaucratic limbo on the grounds of Walter Reed. The stories led to public anger, resulting in the resignation of Secretary of the Army, Francis J. Harvey. Congressional investigations were led by Representative Henry Waxman, who chaired the United States House Committee on Oversight and Government Reform in the House and by Senator Carl Levin on the Senate side, who chaired the United States Senate Committee on Armed Services. Republicans and Democrats jointly criticized the parties responsible for conditions.

This prompted President George W. Bush to appoint former Senate Majority Leader and 1996 presidential candidate Bob Dole and former United States Secretary of Health and Human Services Donna Shalala to oversee the process of healthcare for injured soldiers.

The Post was awarded the 2008 Pulitzer Prize for Public Service for uncovering the problems at Walter Reed.

== Awards ==
In 2008, she received the Elijah Parish Lovejoy Award for Courage in Journalism for "her closely observed narratives of people living on the margins of society in America".

Hull is a recipient of the Robert F. Kennedy Journalism Award, the Investigative Reporters and Editors Medal, the Worth Bingham Prize for Investigative Journalism, and the ASNE Distinguished Writing Award. She has been a Pulitzer Prize finalist several times.

== Other ==
Hull was a Nieman Fellow at Harvard (Class of '95). She has been a Holtzbrinck Fellow at the American Academy in Berlin (2010) and a visiting Ferris Professor of Journalism at Princeton University (2011). She served on the Board of Trustees of the Poynter Institute For Media Studies in St. Petersburg. She lives in Washington, D.C.
