= The New Timer =

1995 song performed by Bruce Springsteen

Song by Bruce Springsteen

from the album The Ghost of Tom Joad
- Released: November 21, 1995
- Recorded: March – August 1995 at Thrill Hill West in Los Angeles
- Genre: Folk rock
- Length: 5:49
- Label: Columbia
- Songwriter: Bruce Springsteen
- Producers: Bruce Springsteen, Chuck Plotkin

"The New Timer" is a song by the American singer-songwriter Bruce Springsteen from his 1995 acoustic album The Ghost of Tom Joad. Springsteen performs the song solo on the album, with only guitar accompaniment.

== Lyrics ==
The narrator of the song is a man who has left behind a wife and children in Pennsylvania in order to find work, but ends up becoming a hobo, riding on freight trains. He tells of an older man, Frank, who has been riding the rails since the Great Depression and serves as a protector and mentor to the narrator. They eventually part ways, and the narrator never sees Frank again except for one night when Frank passed him on a rail car, shouted the narrator's name, and then "disappeared into the rain and wind." Eventually Frank is found dead, killed for no apparent reason, just "somebody killin' just to kill." Afterwards, the narrator daydreams about the family he left behind and prays for love and mercy, although his heart is filled with hatred and longing for vengeance.

== Inspiration ==
"New Timer" and another song from The Ghost of Tom Joad, "Youngstown," were inspired by Springsteen reading Dale Maharidge's 1985 book Journey to Nowhere: The Saga of the New Underclass, illustrated by Michael Williamson. The narrator is the "new timer," defined by Maharidge as a "new breed of street person, forced to the bottom by economic hardship". Unlike older hobos, they had once been members of the middle class, making their circumstances particularly painful. The 1996 reprint of Journey to Nowhere included an introduction by Springsteen and the lyrics of his "The New Timer" and "Youngstown". Another influence on the song was the real-life story of Thomas Jefferson "Alabama" Glenn, who became a hobo during the Great Depression. Glenn and two others were killed one night for no apparent reason, like Frank in the song. Woody Guthrie's songs from the 1930 and '40s were another influence.

"The New Timer" has a similar tone and melody as Springsteen's earlier song "Nebraska". Both songs tell stories of needless violence. In "Nebraska" the narrator is a murderer who states that he kills because "there's just a meanness in this world"; in "The New Timer", Frank is murdered for no reason, by "somebody killin' just to kill."

The narrator sings that he and Frank took transient work such as picking peaches. This appears to be a nod to one of the jobs the Joads take in John Steinbeck's novel The Grapes of Wrath, which inspired the title (and the title song) of The Ghost of Tom Joad.

== Personnel ==
Credits from The Ghost of Tom Joad liner notes.

- Bruce Springsteen – vocal, guitar
