= Lewis Spratlan =

American music academic (1940–2023)

Meriwether Lewis Spratlan Jr. (September 5, 1940 – February 9, 2023) was an American music academic and composer of contemporary classical music.

== Biography ==
Lewis Spratlan, recipient of the 2000 Pulitzer Prize in music and the Charles Ives Opera Award (2016) from the American Academy of Arts and Letters, was born in 1940 in Miami, Florida. His music, often praised for its dramatic impact and vivid scoring, is performed regularly throughout the United States, Canada, and Europe. He held undergraduate and graduate degrees from Yale University, where he studied with Mel Powell and Gunther Schuller. From 1970 until his retirement in 2006 he served on the music faculty of Amherst College, and has also taught and conducted at Penn State University, Tanglewood, and the Yale Summer School of Music. He died at home on February 9, 2023, at the age of 82 in the company of his son, musician Daniel Spratlan.

He was the recipient of an American Academy of Arts and Letters Award in Composition, as well as Guggenheim, Rockefeller, Bogliasco, NEA, Massachusetts Cultural Council, and MacDowell Fellowships.

In October 1989 Spratlan toured widely in Russia and Armenia as a guest of the Soviet Composers' Union. Apollo and Daphne Variations for orchestra was premiered on this tour and Penelope's Knees, double concerto for alto saxophone and bass, was presented in Moscow's Rachmaninoff Hall under Emin Khatchatourian.

Recent works include the one-act opera Earthrise, on a libretto by Constance Congdon, commissioned by San Francisco Opera; a piano quartet, Streaming, commissioned by the Ravinia Festival for its centennial celebration; Sojourner for ten players, commissioned for Dinosaur Annex Music Ensemble by the Koussevitzky Music Foundation in the Library of Congress; Zoom, for chamber orchestra, commissioned by the New York ensemble Sequitur; Wonderer, commissioned for the pianist Jonathan Biss by the Borletti-Buitoni Trust; Shadow, commissioned by the cellist Matt Haimovitz; and Concerto for Saxophone and Orchestra, a consortium commission by thirty saxophonists across the country; A Summer's Day, commissioned by the Boston Modern Orchestra Project, Gil Rose, conductor, was premiered at Jordan Hall in May 2009.

Spratlan's opera Life is a Dream, on a libretto by James Maraniss after Calderón's La vida es sueño, received its world premiere by the Santa Fe Opera in 2010, under the baton of Leonard Slatkin. Hesperus is Phosphorus, commissioned by the Crossing Choir and Philadelphia's Network for New Music, received performances in Philadelphia and New York in June 2012, and was recently released on an Innova CD. Architect, a chamber opera based on the life and work of the architect Louis Kahn, appears on a CD/enhanced DVD released by Navona Records in the fall of 2013. He has recently completed Shining: Double Concerto for Cello and Piano, commissioned by cellist Matt Haimovitz and pianist Christopher O'Riley. In the fall of 2014 The Boston Modern Orchestra Project released a CD of A Summer's Day, Concerto for Saxophone and Orchestra, and Apollo and Daphne Variations. In April 2016 Of War, for large chorus and orchestra was premiered under the direction of Andrew Megill at the University of Illinois, Urbana-Champaign. Bangladesh for solo piano, commissioned by Piano Spheres, was premiered on October 27, 2015, at REDCAT, Walt Disney Concert Hall, Los Angeles, by Nadia Shpachenko; and Common Ground, for soloists, chorus, and chamber orchestra was premiered on June 25, 2016, by the Crossing Choir and ICE at the Philadelphia Episcopal Cathedral and repeated at Merkin Hall in New York as part of the Mostly Mozart Festival in August 2016. This work is a component of the Crossing Choir's “Seven Responses” Initiative. Dreamworlds, for piano, four hands, was commissioned by Dana Muller and Gary Steigerwalt and premiered at Mount Holyoke College in February, 2018. A recording of this piece was released in the fall of 2019 on the Parma label.

Spratlan completed his fourth opera, Midi, a black French-Caribbean Medea, ca. 1930. An all-Spratlan concert including, Six Preludes for Piano, Piano Quartet No. 2, and Trio for Clarinet, Violin and Piano took place at Brooklyn's Bargemusic, as part of their Music Now series, on June 16, 2017. New England Concordance, for TTBB chorus and piano, received its premiere performance in Lexington, MA, on June 3, 2018, by the Boston Sängerfest Men's Chorus, Thomas Berryman, conductor, and has had subsequent performances by the Harvard and Rutgers Glee Clubs. Six Rags was premiered at San Francisco's Center for New Music by Nadia Shpachenko on June 18, 2019. Travels was presented by the Carmel Bach Festival on July 21, 2019, Andrew Megill conductor.

RECORDINGS:

Two Pieces for Orchestra - Opus One Records (LP) Night Music - Gasparo CD When Crows Gather, Concertino for Violin and Chamber Ensemble, Of Time And the Seasons, and Zoom - Albany CD Vocalise with Duck – Koch International Classic CD Shadow – Oxingale CD In Memoriam, Streaming – Navona CD Architect (chamber opera) – Navona CD and enhanced DVD Trio for Clarinet, Violin, and Piano – Albany CD A Summer's Day – BMOP/Sound CD Concerto for Saxophone and Orchestra – BMOP/Sound CD Apollo and Daphne Variations – BMOP/Sound CD Vespers Cantata: Hesperus is Phosphorus ¬– Innova CD Common Ground – (Component of Seven Responses) Innova CD Dreamworlds – Parma CD (released October 9, 2018) Bangladesh from the Poetry of Places – winner of both Aaron Copland and Ditson Awards, Nadia Shpachenko, pianist; Reference Recordings CD; January 2019 release

== Vocal works ==
The winner of the Pulitzer Prize for Music in 2000 for a concert version of Act 2 of his 3-act opera Life Is a Dream, Spratlan had begun the opera in 1975 and completed it in 1978, originally as a commission from the New Haven Opera. By the time Spratlan had finished the work, the New Haven Opera had ceased to exist and the opera was not staged.

Act 2 of the opera received its first full performance at Amherst College in January 2000, and subsequently at Harvard University. The Santa Fe Opera accepted the score for production in its 2010 season, and the complete opera received its first full production there on 24 July 2010. Spratlan wrote his second opera, Earthrise, on commission from San Francisco Opera.

Architect, a chamber opera about the architect Louis Kahn, was released by Navona Records in 2013.

A choral/solo/orchestral work titled "Of War" was premiered on April 9, 2015, at the University of Illinois. Three movements are based on texts by Spratlan and Constance Congdon, and the text of the third movement "Vigil Strange" is from the collection Drum-Taps, book 21 of Leaves of Grass by Walt Whitman.

== List of compositions ==
Most earlier works published by G. Schirmer (Associated Music publishers); most later works published by Oxingale Music.

- Tennessee Set (1968)
- Flange (1970)
- Two Pieces for Orchestra (1971)
- Images (1971)
- Three Carols on Medieval Texts (1971)
- Diary Music I (1972)
- Dance Suite (1973)
- Three Plath Songs (1973)
- Three Ben Jonson Songs (1974)
- Life is a Dream (opera in 3 acts) (1978)
- Chiasmata (1979)
- Cornucopia (1979)
- Coils (1980)
- Webs (1981)
- String Quartet No. 1 (1983)
- Celebration (1984)
- Penelope's Knees (double concerto) (1985)
- When Crows Gather (1986)
- Apollo and Daphne Variations (orchestra) (1987)
- Wolves (1988)
- Toccapsody (1989)
- Hung Monophonies (1990)
- Night Music (1990)
- In Memoriam (1993)
- A Barred Owl (1994)
- Psalm 42 (1996)
- Vocalise with Duck (1998)
- Sojourner (1999)
- Two Orchestral Sketches (1999)
- Mayflies (2000)
- Rhapsody (for orchestra) (2000)
- Dona Nobis Pacem (chorus SATB/SSAA, a cappella, 2001)
- Moments - Memento - Momentum (violin and piano 2001)
- Peeve (string quartet) (2001)
- Of Time and the Seasons ( sop. and c. ensemble, 2001)
- Earthrise (opera in one act) (2002)
- Zoom (chamber orchestra) (2003)
- The Manatees at Blue Springs (2003)
- Streaming (2004)
- Mega-Ditty (2004)
- Piccolosophy (2005)
- Wonderer (2005)
- Ophélie (2005)
- Shadow (2006)
- Four Songs for Soprano and Women's Chorus (2008)
- City Song (for the 150th Anniversary of the Yale Glee Club, 2010)
- A Summer's Day (orchestra, 2009)
- Trio for clarinet, violin, and piano (2010)
- Travels (commissioned by the Rutgers University Glee Club, 2011)
- Process/Bulge (chamber ensemble, 2011)
- Sinfonietta Concertante (solo string quartet and orchestra, 2011)
- Vespers Cantata: Hesperus is Phosphorus (commissioned by The Crossing and the Network for New Music, 2012)
- Ballad of the Happy Kitchen (sop. piano, 2012)
- Shining: Double concerto for cello, piano, and orchestra, 2013)
- Joy Song (solo clarinet) (2013)
- Horn Quartet (horn, violin, cello, piano, 2013)
- Of War (SATB chorus, orchestra, 2014)
- The Fish (tenor, horn, and piano, 2015)
- Hornpipe for Ruth (Chamber ensemble, 2015)
- Bangladesh (piano, 2015)
- Dreamworlds (piano, four hands, 2016)
- Common Ground (SATB chorus, chamber orchestra, 2016)
- Gentle Soul, Find Peace (vocal quartet, 2016)
- Six Preludes for Piano, 2017
- Piano Quartet no. 2, 2017
- New England Concordance (SATB chorus, piano, 2017)
- Charlottesville: Summer of 2017 (sextet, 2017)
- Chamber Symphony (chamber orchestra, 2017)
- Gaia (trio, 2018)
- Six Rags (piano, 2018)
- Some Nebulae (large chamber ensemble, 2019)
- Fantasy Dances (violin, piano, 2019)
- One for Two (solo cello, 2021)

Spratlan's music has been recorded/released commercially for Navona Records, Albany Records, Opus One, Innova, Pentatone, and Gasparo.
