= Northampton Community College =

Public college in Pennsylvania, US

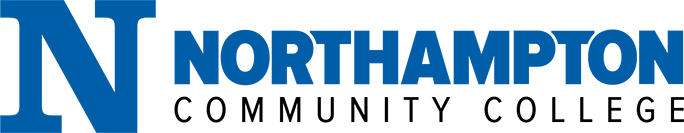
- Wordmark
- Former name: Northampton County Area Community College
- Motto: Where are YOU going?
- Type: Community college
- Established: 1967; 59 years ago
- Endowment: $97.35 million (2025)
- President: David A. Ruth
- Faculty: 118 Full-time & 910 Part-time
- Administrative staff: 1,300
- Students: 8,951 (all undergraduate)
- Location: Bethlehem, Pennsylvania, U.S. 40.6725°N 75.3234°W
- Colors: White and blue (school); Orange and black (sports)
- Sporting affiliations: NJCAA
- Mascot: Sam Spartan
- Website: www.northampton.edu

Northampton Community College is a public community college in Pennsylvania with campuses in Bethlehem in Northampton County and Tannersville in Monroe County. The college, founded in 1967, also has satellite locations in the south side of Bethlehem and Hawley. The college serves more than 34,000 students a year in credit and non-credit programs.

Northampton grants associate degrees, certificates and diplomas in more than 100 fields including arts and humanities, business and technology, education and allied health. It is one of the largest employers in the Lehigh Valley and a major educator of registered nurses, licensed practical nurses, emergency responders, radiologic technologists, dental hygienists, veterinary technologists, funeral service directors, chefs and early childhood educators for the region.

The college is also one of the largest providers of workforce training, adult literacy programs, and non-credit classes in a four-county region and the only community college in Pennsylvania to offer on-campus housing.

== History ==
In the 1960s business leaders and educators from Northampton County saw the need for a college that could provide a well-trained workforce for local employers and give area residents an opportunity to get an affordable college education without leaving the area. Early advocates for the community college included Dr. Glenn Christensen, provost and vice-president of Lehigh University; Charles Fuller, president of Fuller Paper Company and a member of the Easton Area School Board; and State Senator Jeanette Reibman.

The college started on 165 acres (0.67 km^{2}) of farmland in Bethlehem Township in eight modular classrooms. Credit classes began on October 2, 1967. Four hundred and fifty students were expected. Eight hundred and forty-six showed up. By the following year enrollment had grown to 1,442. In 1969–70 the college earned accreditation from the Middle States Association and broke ground for five permanent buildings, which were completed in 1972. These included the College Center, a Science and Technology Center (Penn Hall), a classroom building (Founders Hall), a Business and Engineering Center (Richardson Hall) and an Arts Center (Kopecek Hall) which housed the College Theatre. In 1977, the Funeral Service and Radiologic Technologies Building opened on South Campus. It is now called Commonwealth Hall. A renovation project occurred between 1986 and 1988, expanding the number of classrooms and renaming all of the buildings on the South Campus. In 1992, the Child Development Center opened and was named in honor of State Senator Jeanette Reibman. Also in 1992 Communications Hall was built to house the departments of Radio/TV, Art, Photography and Communications/Theatre.

Richard C. Richardson was president for the first ten years. He was succeeded by Robert Kopecek in 1977. The college's academic programs, enrollment and facilities grew during Kopecek's 26-year tenure. When Kopecek retired, the trustees chose Dr. Arthur Scott, an administrator who had been on the staff for over 25 years, as the college's next leader. During Scott's nine years as president, Northampton opened a site on the southside of Bethlehem and broke ground for a new campus in Monroe County. He was succeeded by Mark Erickson who had been on the staff of Lehigh University before becoming president of Wittenberg University from 2005 through June 2012.

== Campuses ==
=== Fowler Family Southside Center ===
Named for the family of a well-known local philanthropist, the late Marlene ("Linny") Fowler, the building that now houses Northampton's educational center on the south side of Bethlehem was once the plant offices for The Bethlehem Steel Corporation, one of the nation's largest steel producers. The college purchased the building and began renovating it in 2005, four years after the company went bankrupt. Now more than 31,000 people each year take classes, access medical care, or attend meetings, seminars, conferences, performances, exhibits, public hearings and other events in the building. The Fowler Family Southside Center houses a workforce development center, the Northeast Forensics Training Center, a dental hygiene clinic, a mock casino for training, a 3-D fabrication studio, the Cops n' Kids Reading Room, a demo kitchen, dance studios and St. Luke's Southside Medical Center.

=== Monroe County ===
In 1988 at the request of local citizens, Northampton Community College began offering classes in neighboring Monroe County. The first classes were taught in space provided by the Monroe County Vocational-Technical School. In 1992 the college moved to Old Mill Road in Tannersville, "recycling" a 10,000-square-foot (930 m^{2}) building that had previously been a garment factory. It was also in 1992 that the site gained "branch campus" status from the Pennsylvania Department of Education. Rapid growth in enrollment necessitated the addition of two modular buildings in 1996 and additional expansions in 2000 and 2003, as well as utilization of supplemental space at Fountain Court, Pocono Corporate Center East, the Monroe County Vocational-Technical School, Pocono Mountain West High School, and Pocono Medical Center to meet the demand for education and workforce training.

With enrollment nearing 2000 students and no room for significant additions on Old Mill Road, in February 2006 the college purchased 72 acres (290,000 m^{2}) of land suitable for the creation of a new full-service campus close to Routes 80, 715 and 611 in the geographic center of Monroe County.

The new campus opened in the summer of 2014. All buildings were designed to meet LEED gold standards as models of green construction.

=== Other special facilities ===
Northampton Community College has an Emerging Technologies Application Center (ETAC), a television studio, an Innovation Lab, a "Fab Lab", nationally accredited child care centers, and a restaurant called Hampton Winds staffed by the college's culinary arts students.

== Athletics ==
Northampton Community College athletics is affiliated with the National Junior College Athletic Association (NJCAA), Region XIX, and the Eastern Pennsylvania Collegiate Conference (EPCC).

Intercollegiate sports include men's soccer, women's volleyball, men's basketball, women's basketball, baseball, softball, men's golf, women's tennis, women's cross country, men's cross country, men's lacrosse and women's soccer. Club sports and intramurals are also popular.

In 2015, Northampton hosted the national women's basketball championships for the NJCAA. The women's basketball, tennis, softball and volleyball teams have been ranked in the top ten nationally in the NJCAA, as have the men's basketball and baseball teams. Ten NCC athletes have been named NJCAA All-Americans.

== Notable alumni ==
- Eric Frein, formerly on FBI's Ten Most Wanted Fugitives list for the 2014 Pennsylvania State Police barracks attack
- Carol Guzy, four-time Pulitzer Prize winning photographer for The Washington Post
- Kelly Monaco, model
- Roger Ross Williams, television writer and producer
