= And Their Children After Them (Maharidge and Williamson book) =

Book by Dale Maharidge

- Author: Dale Maharidge
- Publisher: Pantheon Books
- Publication date: 1989
- ISBN: 9780394577661

And Their Children After Them (ISBN 9780394577661; subtitled The Legacy of Let Us Now Praise Famous Men: James Agee, Walker Evans, and the Rise and Fall of Cotton in the South), written by Dale Maharidge, photographed by Michael Williamson, and published by Pantheon Books in 1989, won the 1990 Pulitzer Prize for General Nonfiction. An updated 30th anniversary edition was published by Seven Stories Press in 2019. There is an initial overview of the white sharecropper families living during the Great Depression who were profiled in Let Us Now Praise Famous Men. The book goes on to follow these families into the current era. One finds out how the older generation died, and what happened to the children and grandchildren of the men and women in "Let us Now Praise Famous Men." The author also discusses what happened to the average non-white sharecropper and their family through the years. He notes that at the time of publishing only one member of all the families covered in the earlier work had been able to go to college (and that that person was more than 30 years old at time of graduation), and that while the families are no longer dirt poor, they had not moved up in the social or economic ladder in a meaningful way.
