= Dale Maharidge =

American author, journalist and academic (born 1956)

Dale Maharidge (born 24 October 1956) is an American author, journalist and academic best known for his collaborations with photographer Michael Williamson.

Maharidge and Williamson's book And Their Children After Them won the Pulitzer Prize for General Nonfiction in 1990. It was conceived as a revisiting of the places and people depicted in Walker Evans's and James Agee's Let Us Now Praise Famous Men. Also with Williamson, Maharidge wrote Journey to Nowhere: The Saga of the New Underclass, which singer-songwriter Bruce Springsteen has credited as an influence for songs such as "Youngstown" and "The New Timer".

Born in Ohio, Maharidge was a staff writer for The Plain Dealer and the Sacramento Bee. It was while at the Bee that he formed his partnership with Williamson, who was a news photographer for the paper. The pair have traveled and lived among the rural poor as they documented the underside of American prosperity. Maharidge has also contributed to publications including Rolling Stone and The New York Times.

In 2011, he published Someplace Like America: On the Road with Workers, 1980-2010. His latest project is Bringing Mulligan Home: The Other Side of the Good War which was published in March 2013.

Maharidge attended Cuyahoga Community College, Cleveland State University, and Harvard University, the last as a Nieman Fellow. He has taught journalism at Stanford University and is currently a tenured professor of journalism at Columbia University.

He lives in New York City and Petrolia, California.

== Selected works ==
Books by Dale Maharidge include

- Journey to Nowhere: The Saga of the New Underclass (1985)
- And Their Children After Them: The Legacy of Let Us Now Praise Famous Men: James Agee, Walker Evans, and the Rise and Fall of Cotton in the South (1989)
- Yosemite: A Landscape of Life (1990)
- The Last Great American Hobo (1993)
- The Coming White Minority: California's Eruptions and the Nation's Future' (1996)
- Homeland (2004)
- Denison, Iowa: Searching for the Soul of America Through the Secrets of a Midwest Town (2005).
- Someplace Like America, Tales from the New Great Depression (2011). Foreword by Bruce Springsteen. May 2011.
- Leapers (2012). A novella.
- Bringing Mulligan Home: The Other Side of the Good War (2013), a World War II book.
- And Their Children After Them: The Legacy of Let Us Now Praise Famous Men: James Agee, Walker Evans, and the Rise and Fall of Cotton in the South (30th Anniversary Edition) (Seven Stories Press, 2019)

Audiobooks by Dale Maharidge include

- The Dead Drink First (2019)
