= Jo Becker =

American reporter and author

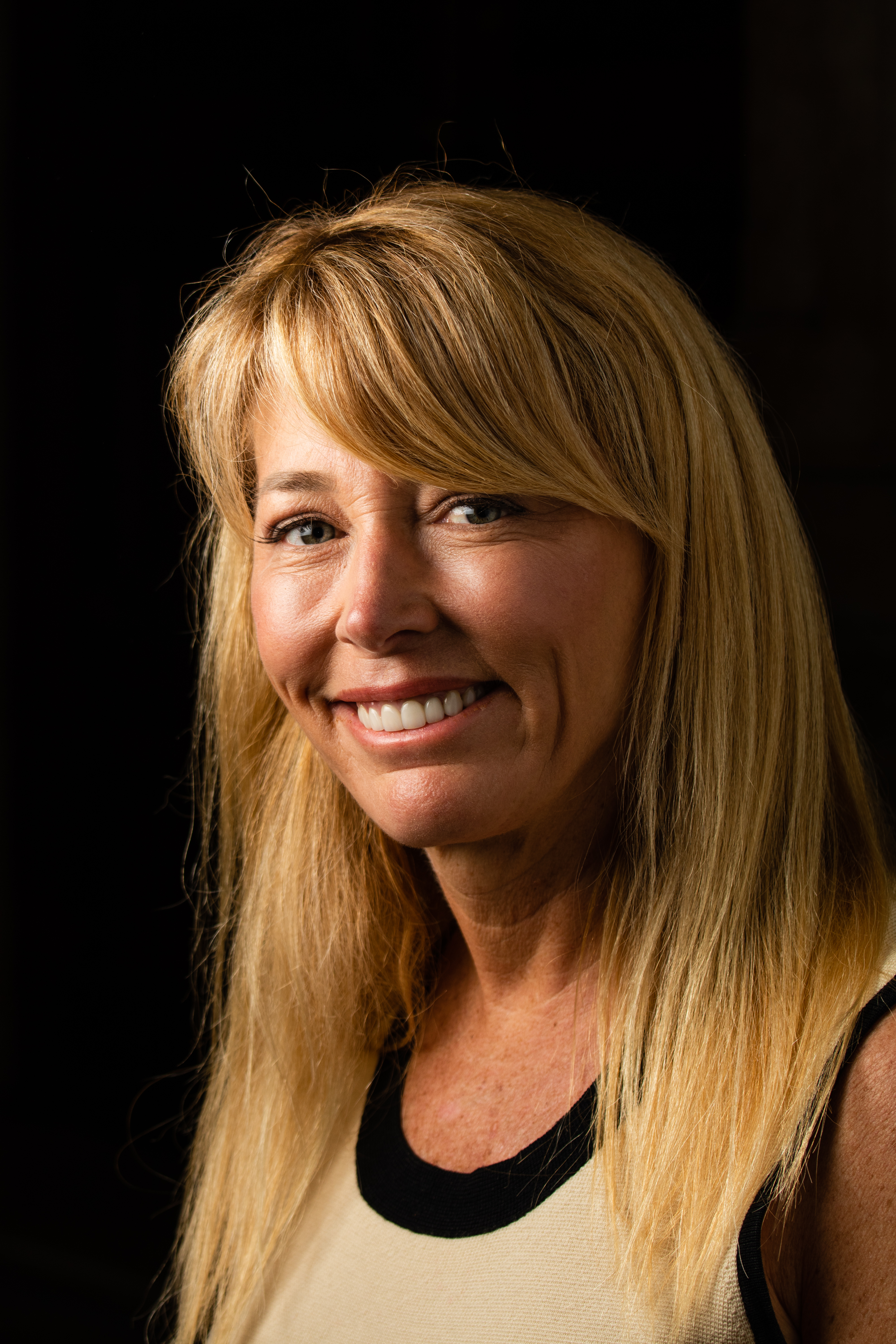
- Becker at the 2018 Pulitzer Prizes
- Education: B.S., University of Colorado Boulder
- Occupation: Reporter
- Notable credit(s): The New York Times, Washington Post, Penguin Press

Jo Becker is an American journalist and author and a four-time recipient of the Pulitzer Prize. She works as an investigative reporter for The New York Times.

== Work ==
Becker worked for the St. Petersburg Times, the Concord Monitor and the MacNeil/Lehrer NewsHour before starting at the Washington Post in 2000 where she covered local and state politics before joining the investigative projects team. Since 2007, she has worked at The New York Times as an investigative reporter.

Becker and Washington Post colleague Barton Gellman won the 2008 Pulitzer prize in national reporting for a series of articles "documenting the power wielded in secrecy by Vice President Dick Cheney." She also shared the 2017 Pulitzer prize in international reporting awarded to the New York Times staff for a series or articles examining Russian President Vladimir Putin's efforts to "project power abroad and undermine the 2016 American presidential election," and the 2018 Pulitzer prize in national reporting awarded to the staffs of the New York Times and the Washington Post for stories about Russia's interference in the US elections.

Becker is the author of Forcing the Spring: Inside the Fight for Marriage Equality, published by Penguin Press, a book about the legal battle to bring the issue of same-sex marriage before the Supreme Court. The book made the New York Times list of "100 notable books of 2014," the Washington Post list of "50 notable works of nonfiction," and the Kirkus Reviews list of "Best Nonfiction Books of 2014." Reviewers called it "a stunningly intimate story," a "riveting legal drama" as "taut and suspenseful as a novel."

David Mixner, a prominent advocate and organizer for the LGBT rights, wrote that the book "captures our struggle for freedom perfectly," while Elizabeth Birch, former executive director of the Human Rights Campaign, wrote that "rarely has an episode of one piece of LGBT work been captured in such sharp relief and detail." But activists who opposed bringing the Prop 8 case, worrying that there weren’t enough votes on the Supreme Court, argued the book gave short shift to the contribution of others. As one reviewer put it: "“Becker’s reliance on the AFER (and, later, HRC) team — primarily lawyers Olson and Boies, staffers Griffin and Adam Umhoefer, and consultants [HILARY] ROSEN and KEN MEHLMAN— is ultimately the book’s downfall.”

Becker has a bachelor's degree from the University of Colorado in political science.

For the academic year of 2012–2013, Becker was appointed as a visiting Ferris Professor of Journalism at Princeton University, teaching investigative reporting.

== Awards ==
- 2018 Shared the 2018 Pulitzer prize in national reporting awarded to the "Staffs of The New York Times and The Washington Post" for deeply sourced, relentlessly reported coverage in the public interest that dramatically furthered the nation’s understanding of Russian interference in the 2016 presidential election and its connections to the Trump campaign.
- 2017 Shared the 2017 Pulitzer prize in international reporting awarded to "The New York Times Staff"
- 2009 Shared the Gerald Loeb Award for Large Newspapers for "The Reckoning," a New York Times series on the 2008 financial meltdown. The series also was a finalist for the Pulitzer Prize in public service.
- 2008 Pulitzer prize in national reporting, with Barton Gellman.
- 2008 Goldsmith Prize for Investigative Reporting, with Barton Gellman.
- 2007 George Polk Award for political reporting, with Barton Gellman.
- 2005 Selden Ring Award for Investigative Reporting, awarded to reporters and editors from The Washington Post for reporting on lead in D.C. water supply
- 1998 Livingston Award for coverage of corruption in the Pasco County, Florida, government
