= Lucian Perkins =

American photojournalist

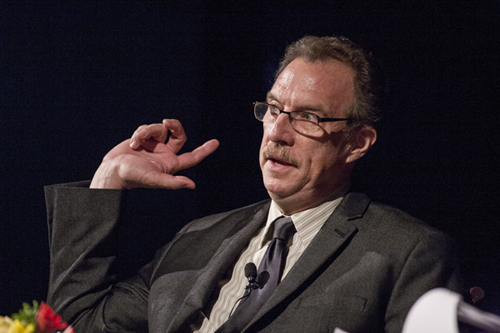
- Lucian Perkins at the LBJ Presidential Library - 2013
- Occupation: photojournalist
- Awards: Pulitzer Prize

Lucian Perkins is an American photojournalist, who is best known for covering a number of conflicts with profound compassion for his photograph's subjects, including the war in Afghanistan, Kosovo and the 1991 Persian Gulf War. It has been said that Perkins has a developed style that not only portrays the hopes and weaknesses of the people in his photographs but in an unconventional manner. Perkins currently works at The Washington Post, where he has worked for the past 30 years and resides in Washington, D.C.

== Student life ==
Lucian Perkins first began experimenting with photojournalism during his time at the University of Texas. In 1976, Perkins graduated with a degree in biology, only to go back to school to earn his teaching degree. It was when he returned, that Perkins discovered a new career interest. After attending a UT exposition workshop on photography, Perkins began exploring photojournalism. He worked for both the Cactus yearbook as well as the student newspaper, The Daily Texan. There he studied photography with the well acclaimed Garry Winogrand. Perkins has additionally acknowledged the UT photojournalism class that he took during his time there, as a strong influence in directing him to photojournalism.

== Career ==
In 1979, shortly after working for The Daily Texan, Perkins went on to an internship with The Washington Post where he was a staff photographer for 27 years. Perkins was initially given the job due to a series he shot in his free time on the first class of female "middies" at the Naval Academy. Once coming on to the paper, Perkins developed a passion for his job in covering extravagant international events. These include the Palestinian revolution, both the Iraq and Afghanistan wars, as well as wars in what was the former Yugoslavia. As well as international, Perkins has documented many local and national events all over the United States. Recently, Perkins has carried on and worked closely with the Post's online version of the paper. He has produced some of the website's first multimedia and interactive projects including the Siberia and Finland Diaries. Presently, Perkins is working as both an independent photographer and videographer, concentrating on interactive media assignments and video documentaries as well as continuing to document in photographic form.

== Awards ==
The first recognized award Perkins received was the "Newspaper Photographer of the Year" by the National Press Photographers Association in 1994. This was given for a portfolio that included photographic projects in Russia as well as several images from New York City fashion shows. A year later, in 1995, Perkins and fellow Post reporter Leon Dash were presented a Pulitzer Prize in the category Explanatory Journalism for their four-year investigation of the consequences of poverty, illiteracy, crime and drug abuse on a three generation family living in the District of Columbia. In 1996, Perkins won the World Press Photo of the year award for his well-known photograph of a young boy looking out a window on a bus full of refugees, leaving Chechnya, Russia. In describing the image, The World Press Photo association said "The boy's expression mirrored all that Perkins had experienced and seen himself, and leaning out of his car, he attempted to steady his camera, focus and shoot. He says he knew this was a special image, mostly because of the symbolic meaning it had for him, but it was not an image he believed would win a contest." Five years later, Perkins once again shared a second Pulitzer Prize in 2000 in the category Feature Photography with fellow Post photographers Carol Guzy and Michael Williamson. They were awarded for their heartbreaking photos illustrating the plight of Kosovo refugees.

== Other work ==
In 1995, Lucian Perkins co-founded InterFoto, an international photojournalism conference located in Moscow with free-lance photographer Bill Swersey. InterFoto was the biggest professional photography exposition in Russia, the Baltic States and CIS countries from 1994 to 2004. The conference explored the Russian photographic community, uniting local, regional and international societies of photographers, photography editors, curators, and industrial leaders to swap ideas, share and educate others on the art of professional photography. In 1996 Perkins and Leon Dash published a book illustrating their Pulitzer Prize–winning investigation titled Rosa Lee : A Mother and Her Family in Urban America. In 1998, Perkins published his next book Runaway Madness, and had it exhibited nationally. The book has over 100 images of a behind-the-scenes story of a popular New York fashion event. Perkins photographed models Kate Moss, Naomi Campbell, Shalom Harlow, Christy Turlington and more behind the curtain. Perkins also photographed fashion journalists, fashion editors and buyers as well as the audience. Later, Perkins curated the book and founded the exhibit, Chronicles of Change, which held much Russian photography. Perkins first went to Russia in 1988 to cover a summit between Ronald Reagan and Mikhail Gorbachev but ended up spending over a month in the country. Later he went back in 1993 and spent much time with a number of Russian photographers during his six-month visit, which led him to Chronicles of Change.

== Displayed and Exhibited Work ==
Perkins has had work displayed in museums both in and outside the United States. Internationally, these places would include: World Press Museum in Amsterdam, The ART in Embassies Program in Sarajevo, Bosnia, Havana, Cuba, Tokyo, Japan and Ankara, Turkey. In the United States, Perkins has work displayed in The Southeast Museum of Photography in Daytona Beach, Newseum in Washington DC, San Francisco and New York City. He also has exhibits in The American Textile History Museum in Lowell Massachusetts, The Boca Raton Museum of Art in Florida and The Flint Institute of Arts in Flint, Michigan.
