= Carol Guzy =

American news photographer (born 1956)

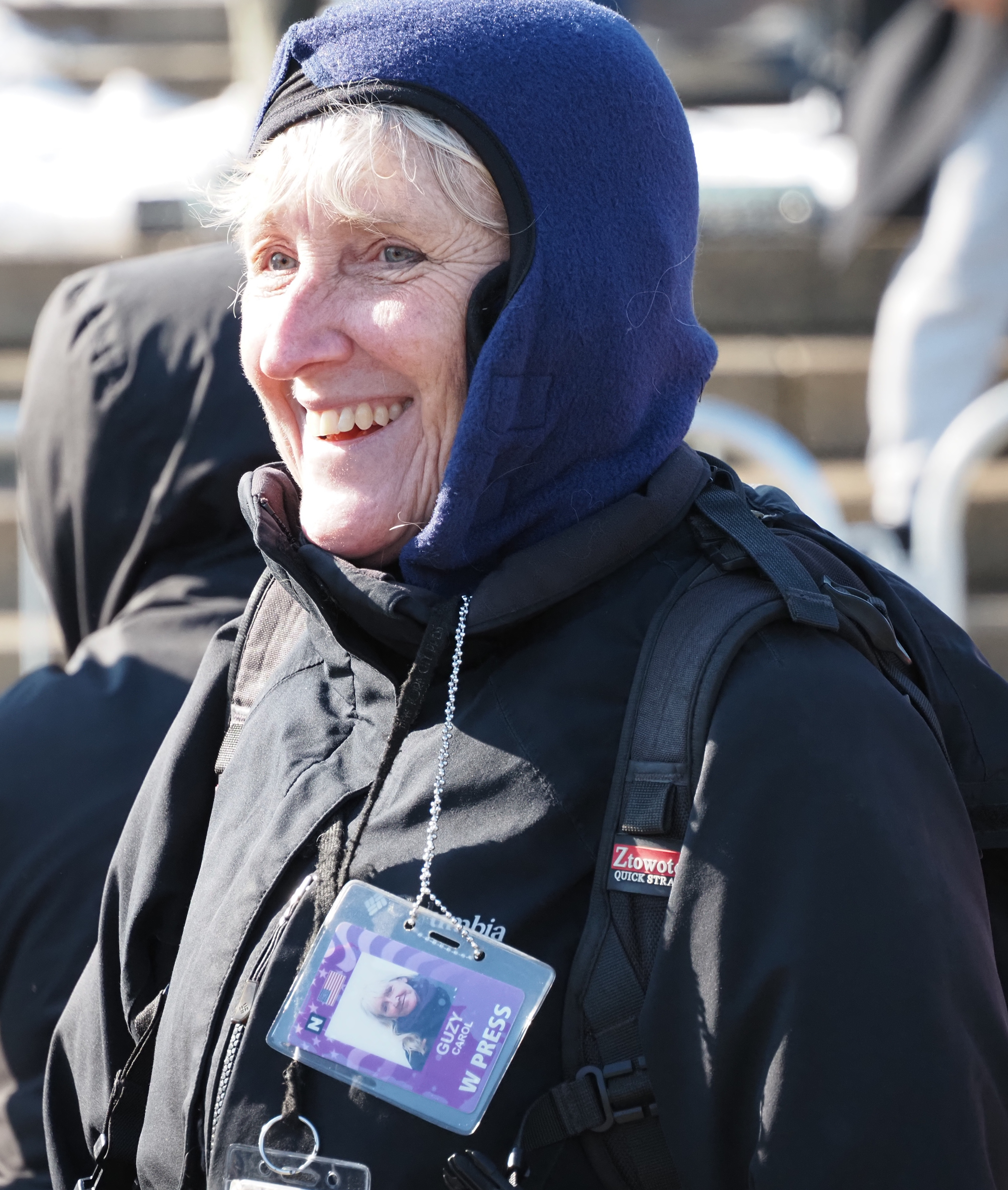
- at the Walk for Peace, Lincoln memorial
- Born: March 7, 1956 (age 70); Bethlehem, Pennsylvania, U.S.
- Occupation: Photographer
- Spouse: Jonathan Utz (divorced)

Carol Guzy (born March 7, 1956) is an American news photographer. Guzy worked as a staff photographer for the Miami Herald from 1980 to 1988 and The Washington Post from 1988 to 2014. As of April 2022, Guzy is a contract photographer for ZUMA Press.

She won the Pulitzer Prize four times — one of five people to do so, and the first journalist with that achievement. Guzy was awarded a Pulitzer Prize in 1986, 1995, 2000 and 2011.

== Life and career ==
Guzy was born into a working-class family in Bethlehem, Pennsylvania, where she grew up.

She graduated with an associate degree in nursing from Northampton Community College in 1977, and planned to work as a nurse until taking a darkroom class. In 1980, she earned an associate degree in applied science in photography from the Art Institute of Fort Lauderdale, Florida. Afterward she became an intern, and then a photographer, at The Miami Herald. She married UPI photographer Jonathan Utz in 1988. That year she also moved to The Washington Post, following her husband to a job in the city. They divorced in 1998.

In 1990, Guzy was the first woman to receive the Newspaper Photographer of the Year Award, presented by the National Press Photographers Association.

She was detained by police and arrested on April 15, 2000, as a part of the IMF World Bank detentions.

In 2001, she was awarded the Northampton Community College Alumni Association's Professional Achievement Award. Upon receiving it, Guzy said,

The nursing program gave me more than a degree. It helped me gain an understanding of human suffering and an incredible sensitivity to it. I know that without this background, my photography would have a totally different edge

Besides her work in The Washington Post, Guzy's work has appeared on the Photography Channel.

In August 2007, Guzy's photos of animals left behind on the Gulf Coast, where she spent months in the aftermath of Hurricane Katrina, were included in a three-artist benefit exhibit titled "Lest We Forget: Three Perspectives on Hurricane Katrina" at the Discovery Too art gallery in Bethesda, Maryland.

Guzy lives in Arlington, Virginia.

== Pulitzer Prizes ==
Guzy is one of only five people to win the Pulitzer Prize four times.

Year	Category	Shared with	For coverage of	Refs
1986	Spot News Photography	Michel du Cille	The Armero tragedy following the eruption of Nevado del Ruiz in Colombia	
1995	Spot News Photography	—	Unrest in Haiti associated with Operation Uphold Democracy	
2000	Feature Photography	Michael Williamson and Lucian Perkins	Kosovo War refugees	
2011	Breaking News Photography	Nikki Kahn and Ricky Carioti	Aftermath of the 2010 Haiti earthquake	

== Awards ==
- 1986: Pulitzer Prize for Spot News Photography, Guzy and Michel du Cille, The Miami Herald
- 1995: Pulitzer Prize for Spot News Photography, Guzy, The Washington Post
- 2000: Pulitzer Prize for Feature Photography, Guzy, Michael Williamson and Lucian Perkins, The Washington Post
- 1990; 1993; 1997: Photographer of the Year awards in the National Press Photographers' annual contest
- 2009: Best of Photojournalism, Enterprise Picture Story, National Press Photographers Association
- 2009: Robert F. Kennedy Journalism Award (International Photo)
- 2009: The Hillman Prize, Photo-journalism
- 2011: Pulitzer Prize for Breaking News Photography, Guzy, Nikki Kahn and Ricky Carioti, The Washington Post
- 2012: Photographer of the Year, Photo Imaging Manufacturers and Distributors Association (PMDA) annual awards
- 2013: Missouri Honor Medal for Distinguished Service in Journalism "In recognition of her creative and principled use of the camera in pursuit of compassion and social justice"
- 2018: Robert Capa Gold Medal Award for her reportage about the effects of the war against ISIS on the civilian population of Mosul
- 2019: Al Neuharth Award for Excellence in the Media presented by the Newseum (Washington, D.C.)
- 2021: White House News Photographers Association Lifetime Achievement Award presented in Washington, D.C.
- 2026: World Press Photo of the Year for "Separated by ICE"

== Selected works ==
- "1997 Picture of the Year", The Washington Post
- "1st Place, Enterprise Picture Story (large markets)", Best of Photojournalism
- "Tapestry of Life: Essay and Photos by Carol Guzy", Poynter Online, Feb. 23, 2000
