= James Maraniss =

American literary scholar and librettist (1945–2022)

James Maraniss (March 22, 1945 – January 9, 2022) was an American academic. He was born in Ann Arbor; his family later moved to Madison, Wisconsin. He was a graduate of Harvard University and held a Ph.D. from Princeton University. He was professor of Spanish and European studies at Amherst College from 1972 to 2015. He won a Pulitzer Prize in 2000 for an opera based on the early 17th-century drama La Vida es sueño by Pedro Calderon de la Barca. Maraniss died from a heart attack on January 9, 2022, at the age of 75.
