= Michel du Cille =

American photojournalist

Michel du Cille (January 24, 1956 – December 11, 2014) was a Jamaican-born American photojournalist who won three Pulitzer Prizes. He shared the 1986 Pulitzer Prize for Spot News Photography with fellow Miami Herald staff photographer Carol Guzy for their coverage of the November 1985 eruption of Colombia's Nevado del Ruiz volcano. He won the 1988 Feature Photography Pulitzer for a photo essay on crack cocaine addicts in a Miami housing project ("photographs portraying the decay and subsequent rehabilitation of a housing project overrun by the drug crack"). The Washington Post received the 2008 Pulitzer Prize for Public Service for his work, with reporters Dana Priest and Anne Hull, "in exposing mistreatment of wounded veterans at Walter Reed Hospital, evoking a national outcry and producing reforms by federal officials."

Du Cille was a photo editor for The Washington Post from 1988 until June 2005, when he became the Post's senior photographer. He credited his initial interest in photography to his father, who worked as a newspaper reporter in Jamaica and the United States. He held a Bachelor of Journalism from Indiana University and a Master's in Journalism from Ohio University. Du Cille was born in Kingston, Jamaica, in 1956. He worked as a photojournalism intern at The Louisville Courier Journal/Times and The Miami Herald in 1979 and 1980 and joined the Herald staff in 1981.

In October 2014, the S.I. Newhouse School of Public Communications at Syracuse University disinvited du Cille from appearing at a workshop because he'd returned three weeks earlier from covering the Ebola outbreak in Liberia. Du Cille said at the time, "It's a disappointment to me. I'm pissed off and embarrassed and completely weirded out that a journalism institution that should be seeking out facts and details is basically pandering to hysteria."

Du Cille died December 11, 2014, from an apparent heart attack at the age of 58 while on assignment in Liberia.
