= Michael Williamson (photographer) =

American photojournalist

Michael Williamson (born 1957) is an American photojournalist. He has won two Pulitzer Prizes.

Of the books he has made with writer Dale Maharidge while both men were on the staff of the Sacramento Bee, And Their Children After Them won the Pulitzer Prize for General Nonfiction in 1990 and Journey to Nowhere: The Saga of the New Underclass was credited by singer-songwriter Bruce Springsteen as an inspiration for two songs from his album The Ghost of Tom Joad, "Youngstown" and "The New Timer".

In 1993, Williamson became a staff photographer for The Washington Post. Photos he took on assignment in Kosovo, along with the work of Post colleagues Carol Guzy and Lucian Perkins, led to Williamson's share of another Pulitzer in 2000.

In 1995 while at The Washington Post Williamson was recognized as Newspaper Photographer of the Year by the National Press Photographers Association (NPPA) and the University of Missouri's Pictures of the Year International (POYi). In 2017 the NPPA honored Williamson with the Sprague Award for commitment to the craft of visual journalism and education. Williamson retired from The Washington Post in 2025.

Orphaned at an early age, Williamson grew up in a series of foster homes, a circumstance to which he attributes his interest in the poor and the downtrodden.

He was married three times and has three daughters.

== Books with Dale Maharidge ==
- And Their Children After Them (1989)
- Journey to Nowhere: The Saga of the New Underclass
  - Re-released. 1995. With a foreword by Bruce Springsteen.
- The Last Great American Hobo (1993)
- Homeland
- Denison, Iowa
