= Pulitzer Prize for Beat Reporting =

Former American journalism award

The Pulitzer Prize for Beat Reporting was presented from 1991 to 2006 for a distinguished example of beat reporting characterized by sustained and knowledgeable coverage of a particular subject or activity.

From 1985 to 1990 it was known as the Pulitzer Prize for Specialized Reporting.

For 2007, the category was dropped in favor of a Pulitzer Prize for Local Reporting, with the Pulitzer Prize Board noting that "the work of beat reporters remains eligible for entry in a wide range of categories that include—depending on the specialty involved—national, investigative, and explanatory reporting, as well as the new local category."

== Pulitzer Prize for Specialized Reporting ==
Year	Name(s)	Publication	Rationale
1985	Jackie Crosby	The Telegraph	"for their in-depth examination of academics and athletics at the University of Georgia and the Georgia Institute of Technology."
1985	Randall Savage	The Telegraph	"for their in-depth examination of academics and athletics at the University of Georgia and the Georgia Institute of Technology."
1985	Mike Klingaman	The Baltimore Sun	"for a series on the effects of alcohol abuse by high school athletes."
1985	Gary Rosenblatt	Baltimore Jewish Times	"for his analysis of the Simon Wiesenthal Center in Los Angeles and other Jewish concerns."
1986	Mary Pat Flaherty	The Pittsburgh Press	"for their investigation of violations and failures in the organ transplantation system in the United States."
1986	Andrew Schneider	The Pittsburgh Press	"for their investigation of violations and failures in the organ transplantation system in the United States."
1986	Bruce Buursma	Chicago Tribune	"for his informed and clear reporting on religion, which included articles on Billy Graham, Pope John Paul II, born again believers and the Catholic Church in Africa."
1986	William Robertson	Miami Herald	"for his literary-journalistic account of rediscovering Mark Twain's Mississippi River in honor of the 100th anniversary of Huckleberry Finn."
1987	Alex Jones	The New York Times	"for 'The Fall of the House of Bingham,' a skillful and sensitive report of a powerful newspaper family's bickering and how it led to the sale of a famed media empire."
1987	Angelo Cataldi	The Philadelphia Inquirer	"for articles that profiled the Philadelphia Eagles football team's 1986 season under new head coach Buddy Ryan."
1987	Irene Wielawski	The Providence Journal	"for medical reporting that consistently examined the human side of complex health care issues."
1988	Walt Bogdanich	The Wall Street Journal	"for his chilling series of reports on faulty testing by American medical laboratories."
1988	Natalie Fobes	The Seattle Times	"for stories and photographs portraying the Pacific salmon's struggle to survive man-made hazards."
1988	Staff	Lexington Herald-Leader	"for its report on the rise and fall of Spendthrift Farm, the famed Kentucky horse breeders."
1989	Edward Humes	The Orange County Register	"for his in-depth reporting on the military establishment in Southern California."
1989	Dennis Anderson	St. Paul Pioneer Press	"for his stories detailing the problems and abuses that endanger America's waterfowl."
1989	Chuck Cook	The Arizona Republic	"for their stories about risks to elderly Americans from prescription errors, drug interactions and medication abuse."
1989	Mike Masterson	The Arizona Republic	"for their stories about risks to elderly Americans from prescription errors, drug interactions and medication abuse."
1990	Tamar Stieber	Albuquerque Journal	"for persistent reporting that linked a rare blood disorder to an over-the-counter dietary supplement, L-Tryptophan, and led to a national recall of the product."
1990	Jim Dwyer	Newsday	"for his coverage of the New York City Subway system."
1990	Claire Spiegel	Los Angeles Times	"for an investigation of mismanagement and abuses at a Los Angeles medical center, stories that led to improvements in patient care and policies at the hospital."

== Pulitzer Prize for Beat Reporting ==
=== From 1991 to 2006 ===
Year	Name(s)	Publication	Rationale
1991	Natalie Angier	The New York Times	"for her compelling and illuminating reports on a variety of scientific topics."
1991	Scott Harper	The Capital	"for reporting that uncovered hazing, sexual harassment and generally biased treatment of female cadets at the U.S. Naval Academy and prompted six congressional and naval investigations."
1991	David Shaw	Los Angeles Times	"for reporting on media coverage of a variety of public issues."
1992	Deborah Blum	The Sacramento Bee	"for her series, 'The Monkey Wars,' which explored the complex ethical and moral questions surrounding primate research."
1992	Russ Conway	The Eagle-Tribune	"for his reporting about questionable business practices in professional hockey."
1992	Gregg Jones	Arkansas Gazette	"for stories about the state's faltering rural health-care system."
1993	Paul Ingrassia	The Wall Street Journal	"for often exclusive coverage of General Motors' management turmoil."
1993	Joseph B. White	The Wall Street Journal	"for often exclusive coverage of General Motors' management turmoil."
1993	Jesse Katz	Los Angeles Times	"for a series of portraits and analyses that illuminated the causes and effects of Los Angeles gang life."
1993	Fawn Vrazo	The Philadelphia Inquirer	"for her comprehensive coverage of women's health issues."
1994	Eric Freedman	The Detroit News	"for dogged reporting that disclosed flagrant spending abuses at Michigan's House Fiscal Agency."
1994	Jim Mitzelfeld	The Detroit News	"for dogged reporting that disclosed flagrant spending abuses at Michigan's House Fiscal Agency."
1994	Joan Connell	Newhouse News Service	"for her reporting and writing on religion, ethics and morality."
1994	John Woestendiek	The Philadelphia Inquirer	"for his coverage of the promise and perils of city youth."
1995	David Shribman	The Boston Globe	"for his analytical reporting on Washington developments and the national scene."
1995	Michael J. Berens	The Columbus Dispatch	"for a series revealing inequities in the county municipal court system, including the widespread jailing of individuals too poor to pay fines for minor offenses and the release of other, more serious offenders who were able to pay."
1995	Jason DeParle	The New York Times	"for Washington D.C. welfare and social policy coverage that focused on the condition of the poor and Federal Government actions affecting them."
1995	Tom Hallman	The Oregonian	"for the series 'Extreme Indifference,' on the prosecution of a drunken driver convicted of killing four pedestrians, and for his reporting on public safety."
1996	Bob Keeler	Newsday	"for his detailed portrait of a progressive local Catholic parish and its parishioners."
1996	Jenni Bergal	Sun Sentinel	"for disclosing problems and abuses in the state's tax-funded Medicaid health maintenance organizations."
1996	Fred Schulte	Sun Sentinel	"for disclosing problems and abuses in the state's tax-funded Medicaid health maintenance organizations."
1996	Alison Grant	The Plain Dealer	"for articles uncovering corrupt dealings between contractors and city officials in the suburb of Beachwood that resulted in indictments and significant reforms."
1997	Byron Acohido	The Seattle Times	"for his coverage of the aerospace industry, notably an exhaustive investigation of rudder control problems on the Boeing 737, which contributed to new FAA requirements for major improvements."
1997	Celia W. Dugger	The New York Times	"for her coverage of the plight of a young African woman who was jailed by U.S. immigration officials after she fled her homeland and its tribal rite of genital mutilation to seek asylum in the country, which prompted worldwide reaction."
1997	Craig Flournoy	The Dallas Morning News	"for his coverage of low-income housing programs, including the disclosure that Dallas officials had misspent or failed to utilize millions of federal dollars allocated for impoverished areas."
1998	Linda Greenhouse	The New York Times	"for her consistently illuminating coverage of the United States Supreme Court."
1998	Keith Bradsher	The New York Times	"for his reporting that disclosed safety and environmental problems posed by sport utility vehicles and other light trucks."
1998	Jason DeParle	The New York Times	"for his coverage of the successes and frustrations of the national effort to reform welfare."
1998	Laurie Garrett	Newsday	"for her reporting on the public health care crisis in the countries of the former Soviet Union."
1999	Michael Hiltzik	Los Angeles Times	"for their stories on corruption in the entertainment industry, including a charity sham sponsored by the National Academy of Recording Arts and Sciences, illegal detoxification programs for wealthy celebrities, and a resurgence of radio payola."
1999	Chuck Philips	Los Angeles Times	"for their stories on corruption in the entertainment industry, including a charity sham sponsored by the National Academy of Recording Arts and Sciences, illegal detoxification programs for wealthy celebrities, and a resurgence of radio payola."
1999	Barton Gellman	The Washington Post	"for his penetrating coverage of the inner workings of the United Nations Special Commission as it sought to impact and disarm Iraqi weapons."
1999	Blair Kamin	Chicago Tribune	"for his lucid coverage of city architecture, including an influential series supporting the development of Chicago's lakefront area." (Note: Moved by the Pulitzer board from the Criticism category.)
2000	George Dohrmann	St. Paul Pioneer Press	"for his determined reporting, despite negative reader reaction, that revealed academic fraud in the men's basketball program at the University of Minnesota."
2000	David Cay Johnston	The New York Times	"for his lucid coverage of problems resulting from the reorganization of the Internal Revenue Service."
2000	Robert O'Harrow	The Washington Post	"for his innovative stories on threats to personal privacy in the digital age."
2001	David Cay Johnston	The New York Times	"for his penetrating and enterprising reporting that exposed loopholes and inequities in the U.S. tax code, which was instrumental in bringing about reforms."
2001	Virginia Ellis	Los Angeles Times	"for her persistent reporting that exposed extensive financial improprieties by a state insurance commissioner, who later resigned."
2001	Rebecca Smith	The Wall Street Journal	"for her prescient and knowledgeable reporting on the electricity shortage faced by the U.S., and the country's failed efforts to deregulate energy."
2002	Gretchen Morgenson	The New York Times	"for her trenchant and incisive Wall Street coverage."
2002	Patrick Healy	The Boston Globe	"for his reporting on education, including a compassionate examination of student suicides at Massachusetts Institute of Technology and revelations of grade inflation at Harvard University, coverage that spawned reforms."
2002	~~Jack Kelley~~	~~USA Today~~	~~"for his wide-ranging and prescient reporting on centers of foreign terrorism, often conducted at personal risk."~~ (Note: A 2004 internal review by USA Today found several of Kelley's articles were fabricated, including four of those that were part of his Pulitzer consideration that would have disqualified his recognition if they had been aware.)
2003	Diana Sugg	The Baltimore Sun	"for her absorbing, often poignant stories that illuminated complex medical issues through the lives of people."
2003	Cameron Barr	The Christian Science Monitor	"for the extraordinary clarity, diversity and context in his ongoing coverage of the Israeli-Palestinian conflict."
2003	David Cay Johnston	The New York Times	"for his stories that displayed exquisite command of complicated U.S. tax laws and of how corporations and individuals twist them to their advantage."
2004	Daniel Golden	The Wall Street Journal	"for his compelling and meticulously documented stories on admission preferences given to the children of alumni and donors at American universities."
2004	Ellen Barry	The Boston Globe	"for her fresh, thoroughly reported and powerfully written stories about neglected people with mental health problems in Massachusetts."
2004	Barton Gellman	The Washington Post	"for his authoritative and provocative coverage of the search for forbidden weapons in Iraq."
2005	Amy Dockser Marcus	The Wall Street Journal	"for her masterly stories about patients, families and physicians that illuminated the often unseen world of cancer survivors."
2005	Ron Brownstein	Los Angeles Times	"for the clarity, consistency and quality of his political reporting during a presidential election year."
2005	Dana Priest	The Washington Post	"for her determined, deeply sourced and insightful coverage of United States intelligence operations."
2006	Dana Priest	The Washington Post	"for her persistent, painstaking reports on secret 'black site' prisons and other controversial features of the government's counterterrorism campaign."
2006	Barry Meier	The New York Times	"for his original, strongly documented stories on a flawed heart-defibrillator that imperiled the safety of unwitting patients."
2006	Jerry Mitchell	The Clarion-Ledger	"for his relentless and masterly stories on the successful prosecution of a man accused of orchestrating the killing of three civil rights workers in 1964."

=== From 2026 to present ===
Year	Name(s)	Publication	Rationale
2026	Jeff Horwitz	Reuters	"for inventive and revelatory reporting on Meta that detailed the technology company's willingness to expose users, including children, to scams and AI manipulation."
2026	Engen Tham	Reuters	"for inventive and revelatory reporting on Meta that detailed the technology company's willingness to expose users, including children, to scams and AI manipulation."
2026	Hamed Aleaziz	The New York Times	"for deeply moving and insightful immigration coverage that held powerful federal agencies to account and revealed the agonizing choices faced by migrants whose lives were upended by the Trump administration's policies."
2026	Nick Miroff	The Atlantic	"for his sustained and vigorous coverage of the Trump administration's immigration crackdown, which included reporting on a deportee sent to El Salvador's Terrorism Confinement Center and on immigration enforcement officers facing daily deportation quotas."
