= Game of Pawns =

2013 American docudrama short film

Short film Game of Pawns

Game of Pawns: The Glenn Duffie Shriver Story is a 2013 American docudrama short film about the Glenn Duffie Shriver case. It was produced by Rocket Media Group, in association with the Counter-Intelligence Unit of the FBI and released online in April 2014. One of the film's goals was to warn students of dangers in China. It featured the actor Joshua Murray as Shriver. Its runtime is 28 minutes. It changes some elements of the story from the real-life scenario, as Shriver is portrayed as a student even though he had already graduated in real life by the time he began the espionage scheme, since the FBI wanted this as a video to warn American tertiary students studying abroad.

Daniel Golden, author of Spy Schools: How the CIA, FBI, and Foreign Intelligence Secretly Exploit America's Universities, described it as "partly propaganda". The FBI wanted U.S. universities to show the film to students about to study abroad, but they largely chose not to do so.

== Production and release ==
The film was released in January 2013. Sean Paul Murphy, the screenwriter, stated that he wished to make the portrayal of Shriver "better and more sympathetic". Golden stated that the film made Shriver seem "more naïve and less cocky". The film depicts Shriver as discovering the true intentions of the Chinese Ministry of State Security (MSS) at a later point than in real life and as being a student when he first gets involved with the MSS even though, in real life, he had already graduated at that point.

Within the film the Washington, D.C. Chinatown is used as a stand-in for Shanghai.

== Reception ==
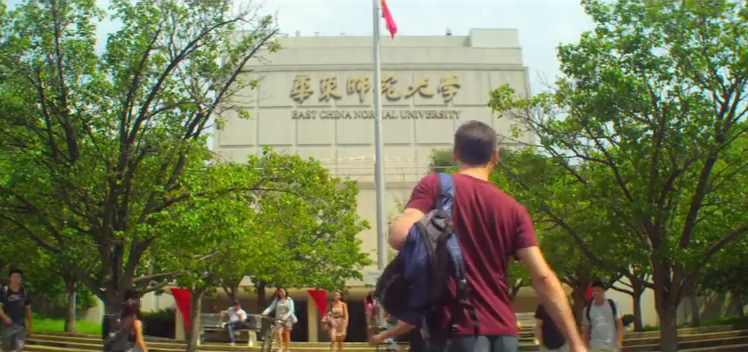
In Game of Pawns Shriver is portrayed by actor Joshua Murray, depicted as being in front of the main entrance to the East China Normal University in Shanghai; ECNU's administration complained about the use of the university in the film.

Adam Taylor of The Washington Post described it as "strikingly cheesy, obviously low-budget". Emily Rauhala of Time described it as "a bit of a stinker" that "comes off as cross between a public service announcement and a parody." Rauhala concluded that since the film had a "stereotypical view of China" it meant that "the people behind it, like Shriver, seem well-intentioned but unforgivably naive." Jason Koebler of Vice referred to it as being "very bad".

The administration of East China Normal University, where Shriver studied abroad, criticized the inclusion of the institution in the film due to potential negative publicity; the film does not mention the institution Shriver matriculated from, Grand Valley State University.

The FBI wanted universities to use the film in pre-departure orientations for study abroad programs, but the universities chose not to do so because they felt espionage was not a likely concern or because there was too much melodrama in the film.

Peimin Ni (Chinese: 倪培民; pinyin: Ní Péimín) and Geling Shang (商戈令; Shāng Gēlìng), professors at Grand Valley State involved in the university's China study abroad program, disliked how the film showed Shriver as being still a student when he was first contacted by the MSS. They mention Shriver in orientation sessions but do not show the film.
