= 1990 Pulitzer Prize =

Awards for journalism and related fields

The following are the Pulitzer Prizes for 1990.

Two awards for Public Service were given in 1990. 1990 was also the last year that awards were given for General News Reporting and Specialized Reporting - these categories were changed to Spot News Reporting and Beat Reporting the following year.

== Journalism awards ==
Public Service	Washington Daily News (Washington, North Carolina); The Philadelphia Inquirer	"For revealing that the city's water supply was contaminated with carcinogens, a problem that the local government had neither disclosed nor corrected over a period of eight years." "For reporting by Gilbert M. Gaul that disclosed how the American blood industry operates with little government regulation or supervision."
General News Reporting	Staff of the San Jose Mercury News	"For its detailed coverage of the October 17, 1989, Bay Area earthquake and its aftermath."
Investigative Reporting	Lou Kilzer and Chris Ison of the Star Tribune (Minnesota)	"For reporting that exposed a network of local citizens who had links to members of the St. Paul fire department and who profited from fires, including some described by the fire department itself as being of suspicious origin."
Explanatory Journalism	David A. Vise and Steve Coll of The Washington Post	"For stories scrutinizing the Securities and Exchange Commission and the way it has been affected by the policies of its former chairman, John Shad."
Specialized Reporting	Tamar Stieber of the Albuquerque Journal	"For persistent reporting that linked a rare blood disorder to an over-the-counter dietary supplement, L-Tryptophan, and led to a national recall of the product."
National Reporting	Ross Anderson, Bill Dietrich, Mary Ann Gwinn and Eric Nalder of The Seattle Times	"For coverage of the Exxon Valdez oil spill and its aftermath."
International Reporting	Nicholas D. Kristof and Sheryl WuDunn of The New York Times	"For knowledgeable reporting from China on the mass movement for democracy and its subsequent suppression."
Feature Writing	Dave Curtin of the Colorado Springs Gazette Telegraph	"For a gripping account of a family's struggle to recover after its members were severely burned in an explosion that devastated their home."
Commentary	Jim Murray of the Los Angeles Times	"For his sports columns."
Criticism	Allan Temko of the San Francisco Chronicle	"For his architectural criticism."
Editorial Writing	Thomas J. Hylton of The Mercury (Pennsylvania)	"For his editorials about a local bond issue for the preservation of farmland and other open space in rural Pennsylvania."
Editorial Cartooning	Tom Toles of The Buffalo News	"For his work during the year as exemplified by the cartoon 'First Amendment.'"
Spot News Photography	Photo Staff of The Oakland Tribune	"For photographs of devastation caused by the Bay Area earthquake of October 17, 1989."
Feature Photography	David Turnley of The Detroit Free Press	"For photographs of the political uprisings in China and Eastern Europe."

== Letters awards ==
- Fiction:
  - The Mambo Kings Play Songs of Love by Oscar Hijuelos (Farrar)
- History:
  - In Our Image: America's Empire in the Philippines by Stanley Karnow (Random House)
- Biography or Autobiography:
  - Machiavelli in Hell by Sebastian de Grazia (Princeton University Press)
- Poetry:
  - The World Doesn't End by Charles Simic (Harcourt Brace Jovanovich)
- General Nonfiction:
  - And Their Children After Them by Dale Maharidge and Michael Williamson (Pantheon)

== Arts awards ==
- Drama:
  - The Piano Lesson by August Wilson (Plume)
- Music:
  - Duplicates: A Concerto for Two Pianos and Orchestra by Mel Powell (G. Schirmer)

Premiered by the Los Angeles Philharmonic on January 26, 1990.
