= Strieber =

Strieber is a surname. Notable people with the surname include:

- Anne Strieber (1946–2015), American author, wife of Whitley Strieber
- Whitley Strieber (born 1945), American author

== See also ==
- Stieber
