= Springfield Daily News =

Former daily newspaper in Massachusetts

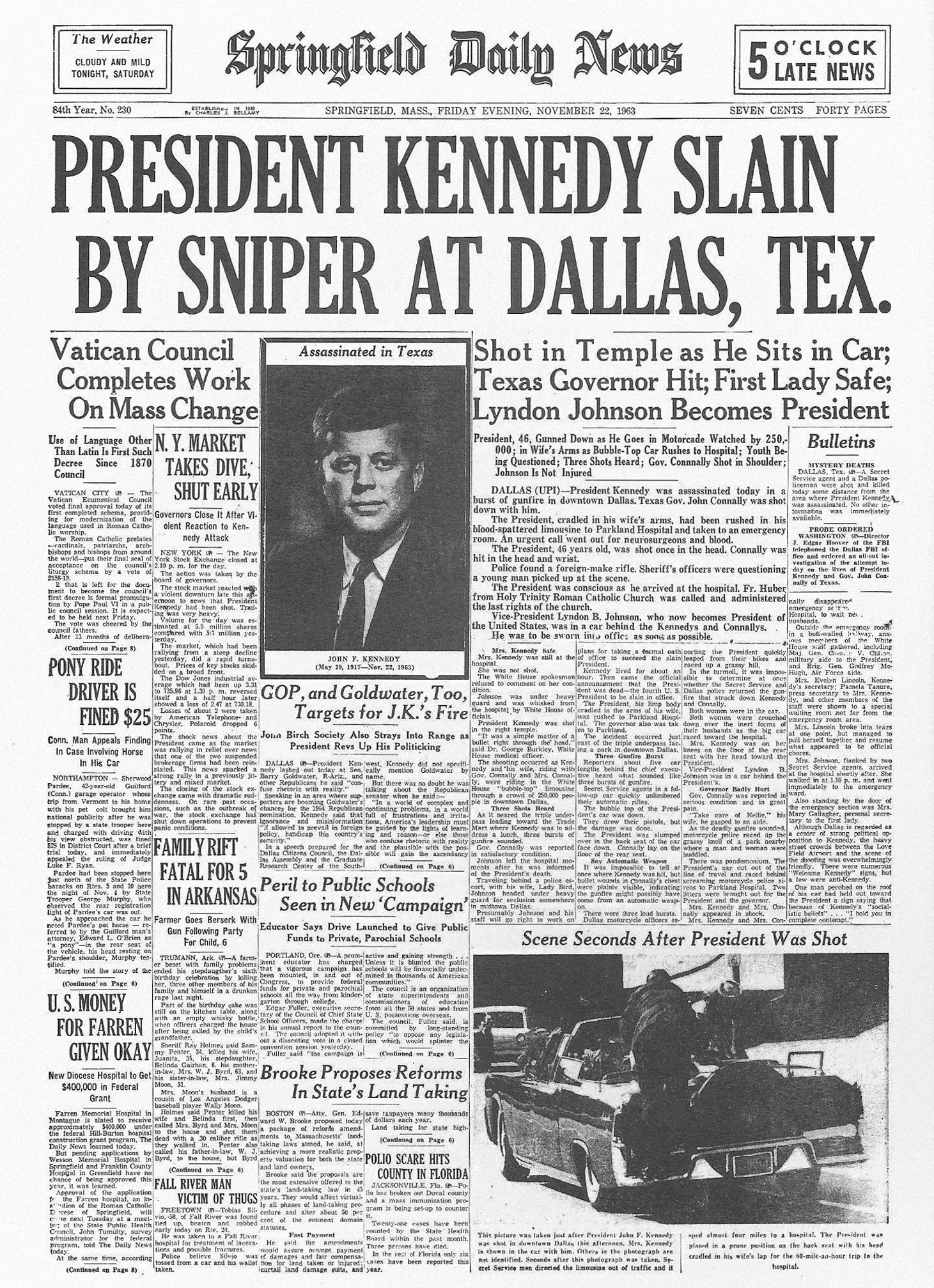
- A late edition of the Springfield Daily News on the day of President Kennedy's assassination, November 22, 1963
- Type: Daily newspaper
- Format: Broadsheet
- Publisher: Daily News Pub. Co
- Founded: 1911
- Ceased publication: 1987
- Language: English
- Headquarters: Springfield, Massachusetts United States
- ISSN: 0191-2828
- OCLC number: 4828153

The Springfield Daily News was a daily newspaper that was published independently in Springfield, Massachusetts, from 1911 to 1969, and then as a merged paper through 30 May 1987. From 1968 through 2007, it was published by Daily News Publishing Company.

One of the more prominent journalists who worked on the Daily News was Brooks Atkinson, who took a job with the newspaper after graduating from Harvard College. He went on to become the assistant drama critic at the Boston Evening Transcript and chief drama critic at The New York Times. Another prominent journalist, Daniel Golden, who worked at the Daily News from 1978 to 1981, won a Pulitzer Prize as a Wall Street Journal reporter in 2004, and wrote several notable books, including The Price of Admission.

== Merger ==
The newspaper merged with the Springfield Morning Union and the Springfield Republican, becoming the Springfield Union News & Sunday Republican. The Morning Union and the Daily News were published as morning and evening editions under their own names, with their own editorial stances, before becoming simply the Union-News in 1988. The Sunday paper was called The Sunday Republican. The papers were part of the Newhouse Newspapers chain and were owned by a corporate entity called Springfield Newspapers. In 2001, the newspaper was merged with the Republican entirely, with the Daily News name dropped altogether.

== See also ==
- The Springfield Republican
- History of American newspapers
