= 2003 Pulitzer Prize =

Awards for journalism and related fields

Winners of the Pulitzer Prize in 2003 were:

== Journalism awards ==
Award	Winner	Citation
Public Service	The Boston Globe	" ... for its courageous, comprehensive coverage of sexual abuse by priests, an effort that pierced secrecy, stirred local, national and international reaction and produced changes in the Roman Catholic Church.."
Breaking News Reporting	The staff of The Eagle-Tribune (Lawrence, Massachusetts)	" ... for its detailed, well-crafted stories on the accidental drowning of four boys in the Merrimack River."
Investigative Reporting	Clifford J. Levy of The New York Times	" ... for his vivid, brilliantly written series "Broken Homes" that exposed the abuse of mentally ill adults in state-regulated homes."
Explanatory Reporting	The staff of The Wall Street Journal	" ... for its clear, concise and comprehensive stories that illuminated the roots, significance and impact of corporate scandals in America." (moved by the jury from the Public Service category)
Beat Reporting	Diana K. Sugg of The Baltimore Sun	" ... for her absorbing, often poignant stories that illuminated complex medical issues through the lives of people."
National Reporting	Alan Miller and Kevin Sack of the Los Angeles Times	" ... for their revelatory and moving examination of the AV-8B Harrier II military aircraft, nicknamed "The Widow Maker," that was linked to the deaths of 45 pilots." (Moved by the Board from the Investigative Reporting category to the National Reporting category, where it was also entered.)
International Reporting	Kevin Sullivan and Mary Jordan of The Washington Post	" ... for their exposure of horrific conditions in Mexico's criminal justice system and how they affect the daily lives of people."
Feature Writing	Sonia Nazario of the Los Angeles Times	For "Enrique's Journey," her touching, exhaustively reported story of a Honduran boy's perilous search for his mother, who had migrated to the United States.
Commentary	Colbert I. King of The Washington Post	For his against-the-grain columns that speak to people in power with ferocity and wisdom.
Criticism	Stephen Hunter of The Washington Post	For his authoritative film criticism that is both intellectually rewarding and a pleasure to read.
Editorial Writing	Cornelia Grumman of the Chicago Tribune	For her powerful, freshly challenging editorials on reform of the death penalty.
Editorial Cartooning	David Horsey of the Seattle Post-Intelligencer	For his perceptive cartoons executed with a distinctive style and sense of humor.
Breaking News Photography	the Photography Staff of the Rocky Mountain News	For its powerful, imaginative coverage of Colorado's raging forest fires.
Feature Photography	Don Bartletti of the Los Angeles Times	For his memorable portrayal of how undocumented Central American youths, often facing deadly danger, travel north to the United States.

== Letters, Drama and Music Awards ==
Award	Work	Winner	Organization
Fiction	Middlesex	Jeffrey Eugenides	Farrar
Drama	Anna in the Tropics	Nilo Cruz	TCG
History	An Army at Dawn: The War in North Africa, 1942–1943	Rick Atkinson	Henry Holt and Company
Biography or Autobiography	Master of the Senate	Robert A. Caro	Alfred A. Knopf
Poetry	Moy Sand and Gravel	Paul Muldoon	Farrar
General Nonfiction	A Problem from Hell: America and the Age of Genocide	Samantha Power	Basic Books
Music	On the Transmigration of Souls	John Coolidge Adams	Boosey & Hawkes; premiered by the New York Philharmonic on September 19, 2002, at Avery Fisher Hall.
