= Joseph B. White =

American journalist

- Born: New York, New York, US
- Education: B.A. in English
- Alma mater: Harvard University
- Occupation: Journalist
- Writing career
- Years active: 1975–
- Notable awards: Pulitzer Prize for Beat Reporting; 1993

Joseph B. White is a Pulitzer Prize-winning journalist known for his work for The Wall Street Journal.

== Early life ==
White was born in New York City. He attended Harvard University and graduated with a B.A. in English.

== Career ==
White started his career at the Vineyard Gazette in Edgartown, Massachusetts.

In 1982, White moved to the St. Petersburg Times.

White joined the Hartford bureau of the Connecticut Law Tribune in 1986.

In 1987, White joined the Detroit bureau of The Wall Street Journal, and became the bureau chief in 1990. White and Detroit bureau chief Paul Ingrassia earned the 1993 Pulitzer Prize for Beat Reporting "for often exclusive coverage of General Motors' management turmoil." Their reporting also earned a 1993 Gerald Loeb Award for "Deadline and/or Beat Writing", and they turned it into a book, "Comeback: The Fall and Rise of the American Automobile Industry," in 1994.

White moved to Brussels in 1994 to become the news editor and chief of correspondents for The Wall Street Journal Europe. He returned the Detroit bureau in 1996 as a news editor covering Columbia-HCA Healthcare and auto industry management issues, and again became the bureau chief in 1998. He worked in the Washington, D.C. bureau from 2008 to 2011 covering business regulation and energy policy, and then returned to Detroit to become the Global Auto Editor.
