= Chuck Philips =

American writer and investigative journalist

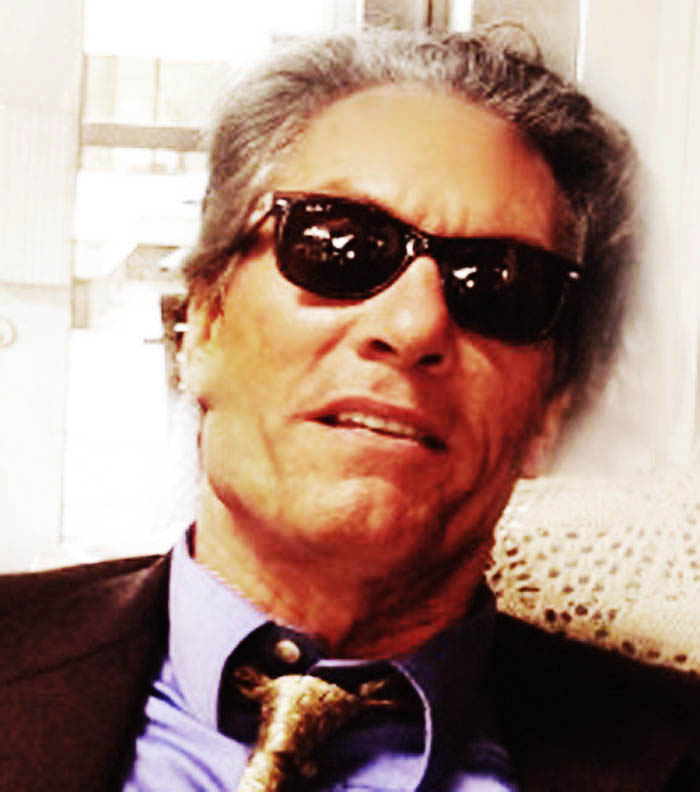
- Philips in 2012
- Born: Charles Alan Philips; October 15, 1952
- Died: January 21, 2024 (aged 71)
- Citizenship: United States
- Occupations: Investigative reporter, journalist
- Awards: Pulitzer Prize; George Polk Award; National Association of Black Journalists Award; Los Angeles Press Club award

Charles Alan Philips (October 15, 1952 – January 21, 2024) was an American writer and investigative journalist. From 1995 to 2008, he worked for the Los Angeles Times. Primarily covering corruption and crime in the music industry, he won the Pulitzer Prize for beat reporting with fellow LA Times journalist Michael Hiltzik. Hiltzik described him as "the most important music journalist of his generation".

== Early life and education ==
Philips grew up in the Detroit, Michigan, area and moved to Los Angeles at 19. He worked for the Wasserman Silk Screen Company of Santa Monica, California, while studying at California State University, Long Beach, where he received a B.A. in journalism in 1989.

== Career ==
Philips worked on staff at the Los Angeles Times from 1995 to 2008. He has written for Rolling Stone, Spin, The Village Voice, The Washington Post, AllHipHop, the San Francisco Chronicle and the The Source.

Phillips reported on the music and entertainment industries in the late 1990s and early 2000s. Focused on the music industry, his investigation into sexual harassment prompted other media outlets to bring "sexual harassment in the music industry to a national forum." Among other investigative reports, he exposed a charity sham sponsored by The Recording Academy, late 1990s payola and illegal detoxification programs for wealthy celebrities.

Philips reported on the East–West rap feud, including the unsolved murders of Tupac Shakur and Christopher Wallace a.k.a. the Notorious B.I.G. His 2002 two-part article for the LA Times claimed that Shakur was killed in September 1996 by Orlando Anderson, a member of the Crips gang. Philips and fellow LA Times reporters wrote articles supporting the theory that Wallace was also killed by the Crips, when he was killed six months later. He reported in 2008 that James "Jimmy Henchman" Rosemond, who managed hip-hop artists, had organized the 1994 attack on Tupac at Quad Studios in New York. He relied heavily on anonymous sources and internal FBI documents. Soon after the article was published, The Smoking Gun reported that Philips's FBI documents had been forged by his informant, a man convicted of fraud. In April 2008, the LA Times printed a full retraction of the Quad Studios article. He was let go during a wave of layoffs shortly thereafter. Philips stood by the facts presented in his story. He said that his reputation and career were ruined by the retraction.

Philips died of unknown causes in January 2024. An obituary in Variety quoted his longtime editor at the Times, Robert Hilburn, who said: "His only allegiance was to the truth. Though other publications eventually followed his lead, none came close to matching his tenacity, daring or impact.”

== Awards ==
In 1999, Philips shared a Pulitzer Prize for Beat Reporting with Michael Hiltzik of the Los Angeles Times for a year-long series that exposed corruption in the music business.

In 1996, Philips won the George Polk Award for investigative reporting about American Black art and culture. In 1997, he won the National Association of Black Journalists Award for coverage of the rap music business.

In 1990, he won a Los Angeles Press Club award for stories about censorship.
