= The Price of Admission =

2005 book by Daniel Golden

The Price of Admission: How America's Ruling Class Buys Its Way into Elite Colleges - and Who Gets Left Outside the Gates
- Author: Daniel Golden
- Publication date: 2005

The Price of Admission: How America's Ruling Class Buys Its Way into Elite Colleges - and Who Gets Left Outside the Gates is a 2005 book by Daniel Golden, a recipient of the Pulitzer Prize in journalism. The book criticizes admissions at elite American universities, including preferences given to the wealthy, children of celebrities, and legacy applicants. It also documents discrimination against Asian-Americans in the admissions process.

In 2017, the book was referenced by John Oliver, in the late-night talk show Last Week Tonight, regarding the way Jared Kushner got admitted to Harvard University, soon after the private Ivy League research university received a donation from Kushner's father. At the end of 2016, Golden expressed "gratitude to Jared Kushner", for "reviving interest in the book".

== See also ==
- Spy Schools - Another book by Golden
