= Amy Dockser Marcus =

American journalist

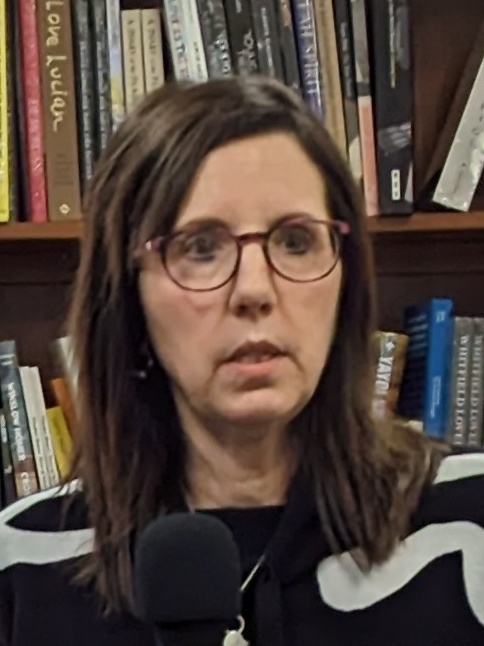
- Amy Dockser Marcus in 2023
- Born: Boston, Massachusetts, U.S.
- Education: Harvard University (BA, MA)
- Occupation(s): Journalist and Book author
- Notable work: We, The Scientists (2023 - Penguin Random House)
- Awards: 2005, Pulitzer Prize for Beat Reporting

Amy Dockser Marcus is an American journalist and author of three books. As a staff reporter for the New York bureau of The Wall Street Journal, Dockser Marcus won the 2005 Pulitzer Prize for Beat Reporting.

== Early life and education ==
Dockser Marcus was born and raised in Boston, Massachusetts, where she attended and graduated from Harvard University for her Bachelor of Arts degree. She returned to Harvard for her Master's degree in bioethics which she received in 2017.

== Career ==
Upon receiving her undergraduate degree, Dockser Marcus began working as a fact checker for the American Lawyer under the guidance of Steve Adler. He promoted her to a reporter position and re-hired her at The Wall Street Journal upon joining their legal group. During the 1990s, Dockser Marcus covered the Arab–Israeli conflict in Tel Aviv before transferring to the Journal's Boston bureau in April 1999. As a result of her experience in Israel, she published her first book, The View from Nebo: How Archaeology Is Rewriting the Bible and Reshaping the Middle East, in 2000. The book was based on several articles she wrote while a correspondent in the Middle East. Dockser Marcus left the Journal for two years to work at Money magazine before returning.

During her second stint with the Journal, Dockser Marcus's mother was diagnosed with gallbladder cancer, leading her to publish Improving the Cancer Care Experience for Rare Cancer Survivors and To Make Progress in Rare Cancers, Patients Must Lead the Way. She earned the 2005 Pulitzer Prize for Beat Reporting for "her masterful stories about patients, families and physicians that illuminated the often unseen world of cancer survivors." Following this, she published her second book titled Jerusalem 1913: The Origins of the Arab-Israeli Conflict, which was also based on her reporting as a correspondent in the Middle East. In 2009, Dockser Marcus and Maryn McKenna received Ochberg Fellowships, awarded to "mid-career journalists who have covered issues ranging from street crime, family violence and natural disasters to war and genocide." She continued to publish pieces on childhood cancer and received a 2014 Field Award from the American Association for the Advancement of Science for her article titled Trials: A Desperate Fight to Save Kids and Change Science. /> In 2023, Dockser Marcus completed a decade of engagement with a parent-scientist community working to make progress in finding a cure for a rare and fatal disease, Niemann-Pick disease type C. Her work with this community culminated in 2023 when Dockser Marcus published her third book "We The Scientists" with Riverhead Books, an imprint of Penguin Random House.
