= Glenn Duffie Shriver =

American spy for China

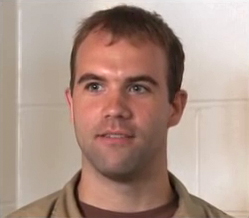
- Born: November 23, 1981 (age 44); Henrico County, Virginia
- Other name: Du Fei
- Education: Grand Valley State University
- Criminal charge: Conspiracy to commit unlawful conveyance of national defense information (18 USC § 793)
- Criminal penalty: Four years imprisonment
- Criminal status: Released December 16, 2013; BOP Register #44634-039
- Spouse: Yumi Kim
- Espionage activity
- Country: United States
- Allegiance: China
- Agency: Ministry of State Security

Glenn Duffie Shriver (born November 23, 1981) is an American convicted of conspiracy to commit espionage for China. At the behest of Chinese intelligence, Shriver unsuccessfully applied for jobs with the US State Department and CIA, meeting with handlers from China more than 20 times. He was first approached while living in China by operatives of the Shanghai State Security Bureau, a subsidiary of China's Ministry of State Security (MSS), who hoped to develop a mole which would provide them information regarding American foreign policy. He was caught and arrested by the FBI soon after applying to a job with the CIA's National Clandestine Service. In a 2010 plea bargain, he pled guilty to one count of conspiracy to commit unlawful conveyance of national defense information, and served four years in prison at the Federal Correctional Institution in Elkton, Ohio. He was released in 2013, and was later depicted in the short film Game of Pawns, commissioned by the FBI.

== Biography ==
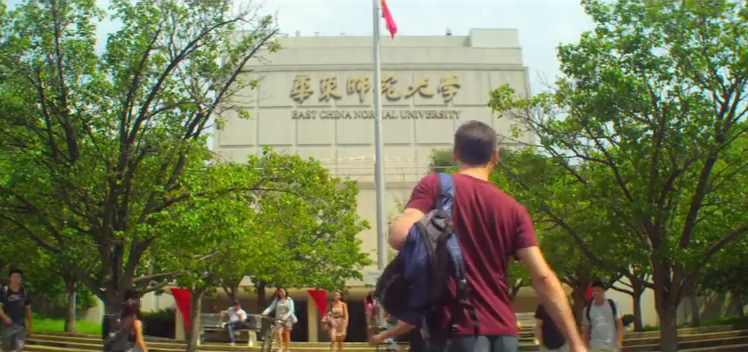
In the short film Game of Pawns produced by the FBI, Shriver is portrayed by an actor, depicted as being in front of the main entrance to the East China Normal University in Shanghai.

Shriver was born in Henrico County, Virginia, near Richmond. When his parents separated in 1983, he moved with his mother to the Jenison area of Michigan. He was a resident of Georgetown Township, Michigan. He attended middle school through his second (sophomore) year in Wyoming, Michigan, and then Jenison High School.

He attended Grand Valley State University (GVSU) in Allendale, Michigan. In 2001, he took part in a 45-day summer study program in Shanghai, China. He subsequently spent his junior year at East China Normal University, also in Shanghai. After graduating from GVSU in 2004 with a bachelor's in International Relations, Shriver returned to Shanghai to work and to study the Chinese language, in which he eventually became proficient. He had a few acting jobs in the Chinese film industry.

In about 2004 Shriver answered an ad to write a paper about U.S.–China relations with regard to Taiwan and North Korea. A Chinese woman calling herself "Amanda" praised his paper and paid him US$120. This was a type of low-key initial approach, common while recruiting intelligence operatives. Amanda eventually introduced Shriver to a "Mr. Wu" and "Mr. Wang". Amanda, Wu, and Wang, all operatives of the Chinese Ministry of State Security, encouraged him to apply for jobs with the United States government or law enforcement, rather than the more common approach of recruiting an existing agent.

Soon they told him they were interested in obtaining classified material, and paid him $10,000 to take the United States Foreign Service Exam in Shanghai in 2005, though he failed to pass. He was paid $20,000 for a second attempt at the exam in 2006 which also failed. Shriver next applied for a position as a clandestine officer with the National Clandestine Service branch of the Central Intelligence Agency (CIA) in 2007. This time he requested and received payment of $40,000 from the Chinese. He took the money to the United States, but failed to report it, as required by law. (Note: A person entering or leaving the United States with an amount of money over $10,000 must report it to United States Customs and Border Protection.)

Shriver enjoyed China so much that he returned there as an English teacher and then lived in South Korea, where he became the fiancé of Yumi Kim. Kim was so impressed with Shriver's love of America that she nicknamed him "Mr. Patriot." In February 2010, when he was in the final stages of processing for a position with the CIA, he lied in order to conceal his involvement with Chinese intelligence operatives. His CIA interviews took place June 7 through June 14 of that year, and he lied during these interviews. Unbeknownst to Shriver, the CIA had learned of his connections early on in the hiring process. The CIA and FBI did not disclose how they discovered Shriver had been recruited by the Chinese government, but stated it was not through normal background investigations.

The FBI detained him after his CIA interviews. Employees in the agencies debated on whether to use him as a double agent.

== Arrest and conviction ==
In June 2010 Shriver was arrested while trying to depart Detroit Metropolitan Wayne County Airport for South Korea and charged with five counts of "making false statements" and one count of "willfully conspiring to provide national defense information to intelligence officers of the PRC". He was denied bail and prosecuted by Stephen M. Campbell, a United States attorney in Alexandria, Virginia. He was held in the Alexandria City Jail.

Shriver was facing up to 10 years in prison under the Espionage Act of 1917 18 U.S. Code § 793 "Gathering, transmitting or losing defense information", but the prosecutor had also threatened him with a prosecution under 18 USC § 794 "Gathering or delivering defense information to aid foreign government" which had a maximum of life imprisonment. Shriver pleaded guilty in October 2010 to one count of conspiracy to commit unlawful conveyance of national defense information as part of a plea bargain which included a full debriefing and polygraph testing. On January 21, 2011 he was sentenced to four years in prison by judge Liam O'Grady.

At the time of Shriver's arrest the case only attracted media attention in Michigan.

Shriver had met with his handlers about 20 times, most often "Amanda", and taken $70,000. Shriver said "I made a terrible decision. Somewhere along the way I got into bed with the wrong people. I cannot tell you what it’s like to carry a dark secret like this for so many years." Professor Geling Shang, one of the leaders of Shriver's summer study group, had worried that Shriver had no sense of what he wanted to do with his life. Shriver stated that he had been motivated by greed. He served his sentence at the Federal Correctional Institution near Elkton, Ohio, with Kim saying she would wait for him.

Wang Baodong, speaking for the Chinese embassy in Washington, said the Chinese government does not do anything to harm the interests of other countries and that the allegations against Shriver will be proven false. This is the normal comment by the Chinese government in cases of foreign espionage. Between March 2008 and July 2010, 44 individuals were convicted by the United States Department of Justice in 26 cases involving espionage on behalf of China. According to David Wise, Shriver was the first known case in which China tried to recruit an American to set up as a mole within the CIA, although the method has been attempted by other countries.

He received an international business master's degree during his incarceration.

Shriver was released from federal prison in late 2013.

After Shriver's arrest, Peimin Ni (Chinese: 倪培民; pinyin: Ní Péimín) and Geling Shang (商戈令; Shāng Gēlìng), professors at Grand Valley State involved in the university's China study abroad program, were searched by US airport security while flying from the US and interviewed by the FBI.

== Dramatization ==
Short film Game of Pawns

Shriver's experience was dramatized in the short film Game of Pawns, produced by Rocket Media Group, in association with the Counter-Intelligence Unit of the FBI and released online in April 2014. One of the film's goals was to warn students of dangers in China. It featured the actor Joshua Murray as Shriver.

== See also ==
- Americans in China
- Gregg Bergersen
- Noshir Gowadia
- Katrina Leung
- Larry Wu-Tai Chin
- Jonathan Pollard
