= Andrew Schneider (journalist) =

American journalist

- Schneider at the Pulitzer centennial celebration in 2016
- Born: Andrew Jay Schneider; November 13, 1942; New York City
- Died: February 17, 2017 (aged 74); Salt Lake City, Utah
- Occupation: Investigative reporter
- Known for: 2-time Pulitzer Prize recipient (1986, 1987)
- Spouse(s): Carol Schneider (divorced); Kathy Best
- Children: 2

Andrew Jay Schneider (November 13, 1942 – February 17, 2017) was an American journalist and investigative reporter who worked for the Pittsburgh Press and Seattle Post-Intelligencer as a public-health reporter. He received back-to-back Pulitzer Prizes while working for the Press: one in Specialized Reporting in 1986 with Mary Pat Flaherty, and another for Public Service with Matthew Brelis and the Press in 1987. Schneider also co-authored a book about an asbestos contamination incident in Libby, Montana, entitled An Air That Kills.

== Personal life and family ==
Schneider was born to Jack and Fran Schneider in New York City on November 13, 1942. His parents were employed at the Fontainebleau Hotel in Miami Beach, Florida, where father Jack worked as a chef and maître d'hôtel and mother Fran worked as a waitress; Schneider would spend most of his childhood in Miami.

Schneider married his first wife Carol, whom he later divorced. His second wife, Kathy Best, is also a journalist. She was a reporter for the St. Louis Post-Dispatch before switching to editing at the Seattle Post-Intelligencer. As managing editor and editor of The Seattle Times, she and the staff won two Pulitzer prizes for breaking news. The two moved together from Seattle to Missoula, Montana, in 2016, after Best was named the editor of The Missoulian. Schneider had a passion for cooking and was known to cook meals for colleagues and throw dinner parties at his home while working in Washington, D.C. He has two children, including his son Patrick, a photojournalist, and two grandchildren. Schneider died on February 17, 2017, at the age of 74 due to heart failure while being treated for pulmonary disease at a hospital in Salt Lake City, Utah.

== Career ==
=== Early work and Pittsburgh Press ===
Schneider attended the University of Maryland and University of Miami, researching technological hazards in graduate school. He entered journalism as a freelance photographer, covering the Vietnam War for Life, Newsweek and Time. Early in his career, Schneider worked for weekly newspapers in suburban Washington, D.C. and for the Associated Press in Concord, New Hampshire.

He arrived at the Pittsburgh Press in 1984, as the paper's medical science writer. During his seven years at the Press, Schneider would be the recipient of two Pulitzer Prizes, shared with his colleagues, in back-to-back years. His first Pulitzer, 1986's Specialized Reporting prize shared with Mary Pat Flaherty, was for the series "The Challenge of a Miracle: Selling the Gift". Schneider and Flaherty began publishing the 13-article series in November 1985 after 10 months of investigation into the United States's kidney transplant system and its abuse by wealthy foreign nationals, who bypassed the long wait lists.

The following year, the Press's investigation into the Federal Aviation Administration (FAA) and its pilot health screening practices, written by Schneider and Matthew Brelis, won the Pulitzer Prize for Public Service. The investigative series, entitled "Danger in the Cockpit", revealed that Federal Air Surgeon Frank Austin Jr. inadequately screened 250 airline pilots for debilitating and potentially fatal medical conditions, including alcohol and drug issues, allowing them to continue operating aircraft, according to Schneider. The investigation led to "significant reforms" by the FAA, including the firing and replacement of Austin.

In 1990, he and Lee Bowman of the Press won the Raymond Clapper Memorial Award for a series on Red Cross disaster aid.

=== Scripps-Howard and Seattle Post-Intelligencer ===
Schneider left the Press in 1991, shortly before the newspaper was bought by the rival Pittsburgh Post-Gazette and ceased publication. He spent several years at the Scripps-Howard Newspapers bureau in Washington D.C. as a reporter and assistant managing editor for investigations. While assigned to a medical story in Haiti in 1994, Schneider elected to stay behind during a U.S. military intervention to cover the overthrow of the Haitian military government.

In 1997, Schneider left Scripps-Howard to join The Oregonian in Portland, Oregon. The following year, he moved to the Seattle Post-Intelligencer (P-I), beginning the first of two stints at the paper that would last six years in total. His first major assignment at the P-I was a five-month investigation of child abuse prosecutions in Wenatchee, Washington, with Mike Barber in 1998. Their findings, published in the five-part series "The Power to Harm", uncovered false confessions from child witnesses and other abuses by authorities in the wrongful arrests of 43 adults, some of whom would be convicted and sentenced to prison. The newspaper's investigation led to the establishment of Innocence Project Northwest, which overturned or reduced the case's 18 verdicts, freeing all of the defendants by the end of 2000; it also convinced U.S. Attorney General Janet Reno to say she might reconsider her decision that "there was no evidence of prosecutable federal civil rights violations." Nat Hentoff of The Village Voice argued that the investigation "deserve[d] to win the Pulitzer Prize."

In 1999, Schneider began investigating asbestos-related deaths in Libby, Montana, for the P-I. His investigation found asbestos particles had been released by a closed vermiculite mine, causing contamination of workers' clothing. The mine operator, W.R. Grace and Company, was alleged to have known about the dangers of exposure to the asbestos processed at the Libby mine and failed to disclose the risks to workers and government agencies in a timely manner. The asbestos contamination, according to Schneider, had killed at least 192 people in Libby, including the wives and children of miners, and at least 375 people were diagnosed with potentially fatal diseases associated with asbestos. The release of the story, entitled "Uncivil Action: A Town Left to Die", gained national attention and led to litigation against W.R. Grace and the indictment of executives on federal charges of knowing endangerment, obstruction of justice, and wire fraud after the company declared bankruptcy and illegally transferred funds and assets to new companies. The Environmental Protection Agency launched an investigation into the Libby mine after the release of the story, and later established a Superfund cleanup site in Libby, declaring in 2009 that the town was under a public health emergency.

=== St. Louis and Baltimore ===
Schneider continued his reporting on asbestos after leaving the P-I for the St. Louis Post-Dispatch in 2001, uncovering asbestos-related hazards from the September 11, 2001 attacks on the World Trade Center in New York City. Schneider, along with P-I editor David McCumber, published a book of their findings entitled An Air That Kills: How the Asbestos Poisoning of Libby, Montana, Uncovered a National Scandal. The book, compiled from Schneider's previous investigations, also revealed that harmful asbestos-related material was in continual use in new construction and household products, and alleged that the federal government withheld the risk of asbestos-related disease after the September 11 attacks. The Libby story was later adapted in 2007 into a documentary film by PBS's P.O.V. program. Schneider and McCumber released an e-book in 2016, An Air That Still Kills, updating their findings on Libby after the EPA declared the city "safe to live in".

Schneider left the St. Louis Post-Dispatch in 2005, arriving at The Baltimore Sun. While at the Sun, he began an investigative series into the use of diacetyl as a food flavoring for consumer products like microwave popcorn. The chemical was found to have been causing lung-related diseases in workers at plants, including Bronchiolitis obliterans ("popcorn lung"), and, according to Schneider, put professional cooks at risk. The investigation resulted in greater recognition of diacetyl's hazards by the public, resulting in a reduction or elimination in its use by manufacturers like ConAgra.

=== Online media and Montana ===
Schneider returned to the P-I in 2007, where he stayed on as a health and food reporter with the "Secret Ingredients" column, continuing to cover the Libby asbestos case until the newspaper ceased publication in 2009. He then moved on to AOL News to cover the health risks of nanotechnology in consumer products, as well as seafood safety in the midst of the Deepwater Horizon oil spill. Schneider later wrote an investigative series on tainted honey shipments from China for Food Safety News and founded the blog Coldtruth.com. At the time of his death in 2017, Schneider worked part-time for Lee Montana Newspapers as a public health reporter. Schneider also co-founded the National Institute for Advanced Reporting at Indiana University in 1990 and served as its first chair.

== Bibliography ==
- Schneider, Andrew; McCumber, David (2004). An Air That Kills: How the Asbestos Poisoning of Libby, Montana Uncovered a National Scandal. New York: Putnam. ISBN 978-0-399-15095-1. OCLC 936846766.
