= Mary Pat Flaherty =

American journalist

- Born: May 7, 1955 (age 71); Pittsburgh, Pennsylvania, U.S.
- Education: Medill School of Journalism
- Occupation: Journalist

Mary Pat Flaherty (born May 7, 1955) is an American investigative journalist and editor. She won the 1986 Pulitzer Prize for Specialized Reporting with Andrew Schneider for an investigation of abuses in the United States organ-transplant system. After joining The Washington Post in 1993, she worked as both an investigative reporter and editor and later became a deputy editor in the newspaper’s investigative unit.

== Biography ==
Flaherty was born in Pittsburgh, Pennsylvania, on May 7, 1955, to Patrick and Mary Lydon Flaherty. She attended Northwestern University's Medill School of Journalism, receiving a B.S. in journalism in 1977. She worked for the Pittsburgh Press as an intern in 1975. After graduating she became a reporter at the paper, and later an editor.

In 1986, she and Andrew Schneider won the Pulitzer Prize for Specialized Reporting for a series titled "The Challenge of a Miracle: Selling the Gift." Flaherty and Schneider began publishing the 13-article series in November 1985 after 10 months of investigation into the United States's kidney transplant system and its abuse by wealthy foreign nationals, who bypassed the long wait lists. She collaborated with Schneider again on a 1991 series on asset seizure and forfeiture titled Presumed Guilty: The Law's Victims in the War on Drugs.

In 1993 she went to work for the Washington Post as an investigative projects editor, returning to investigative reporting in 2000. She was a finalist for the 1995 Pulitzer Prize for Investigative Reporting with Keith A. Harriston for a series of articles on the hiring practices of the Washington D.C. Police Department.

In 2001 Flaherty, along with Joe Stephens, Deborah Nelson, Karen DeYoung, John Pomfret, Sharon LaFraniere and Doug Struck, wrote a six-part Washington Post investigative series titled "The Body Hunters," on American drug companies conducting tests in Third World countries. The series won the investigative reporting award from the Society of Professional Journalists and the Malcolm Forbes Award for international business reporting from the Overseas Press Club of America.

Other notable stories Flaherty has worked on include a 2001 report on faulty testing of the Bell Boeing V-22 Osprey Marine helicopter and a 2013 exposé of massive losses from fraud and embezzlements at nonprofit organizations.

In 2014 she was inducted into the Medill School of Journalism Hall of Achievement. She has also won George Polk Awards and SDX national awards.

== Awards ==
- 1986 Pulitzer Prize for Specialized Reporting, with Andrew Schneider
- Golden Quill Award, Western Pennsylvania Newspaper Association
- Keystone Press Newspaper Publishers' Association
- George Polk Memorial Award, Long Island University, NY, 1992
- Sigma Delta Chi Award, 1992
- Series Reporting Award, Maryland-Delaware-DC Press Association, 1995
- Finalist, 1995 Pulitzer Prize for Investigative Reporting, with Keith A. Harriston
- Investigative Reporting Award, Society of Professional Journalists, 2001
- Malcolm Forbes Award, Overseas Press Club, 2001
