= Development case =

US college admission after parental donation

Development cases are a set of preferences in university and college admission, particularly in college admissions in the United States, separate from merit, athletic, racial and legacy preferences, whereby applicants from wealthy families are more likely to be granted admission to selective universities based on large donations made by family.

The practice is not widely discussed by universities that use it, but is reported to be used by a number of top-ranked schools, Ivy League and otherwise.

== Definition ==
A development case is an application to an undergraduate institution that is set aside during the admission process for further review. In these cases, the merits of admitting a student based on their academic performance, test scores, and extracurricular activities are lowered by the donations of the applicant's family. With development cases, a student whose academic performance and test scores are not enough to merit admission might instead be dependent on the donations the applicant's family may give.

== Mechanics ==
Development cases theoretically have a better chance of acceptance. While there is no universal system for acceptance or rejection from a given university, most elite universities use numerical metrics to deal with the large number of applications, and the development case label can mean a numerical advantage or a tiebreaker in these metrics. This numerical advantage is comparable to that of a star athlete or legacy applicant.

The number of development cases is low, which one source finds surprising. Estimates range from less than 1% to 5%. This low number is due to the decisions of the admissions director and the large amounts of money required to make a difference—in the millions of US dollars.

== Notable cases ==
=== Donald Trump Jr. ===
Donald Trump, who is known not to be generous or philanthropic to third parties per bankruptcies and tax issues, donated $100,000 to the University of Pennsylvania (for the Penn Club of New York) in 1996, the same year Don Jr. '00 gained Penn admission.

=== Jared Kushner ===
Another highly-covered development case is Trump's son-in-law, Jared Kushner's Harvard College acceptance. This case is specifically named by Daniel Golden's book The Price of Admissions: How America's Ruling Class Buys Its Way Into Elite Colleges—and Who Gets Left Outside the Gates. In the book, Golden highlights the 1998 donation of $2.5 million by Jared's father Charles Kushner, concluding that this donation influenced the decision-making process of the admissions committee and ensured Jared's acceptance for 1999. Golden quotes administrative officials from Jared Kushner's high school who did not believe that Kushner could be accepted on merit: "There was no way anybody in the administrative office of the school thought he would on the merits get into Harvard," a former official at The Frisch School in Paramus, NJ, told him. "His GPA did not warrant it, his SAT scores did not warrant it. We thought for sure, there was no way this was going to happen. Then, lo and behold, Jared was accepted. It was a little bit disappointing because there were at the time other kids we thought should really get in on the merits, and they did not."

As Charles Kushner graduated from New York University as an undergraduate and Hofstra University and NYU with a J.D. and an M.B.A, respectively, Jared Kushner wasn't a legacy admission, a more widely acknowledged as a factor in admissions decisions. Annual reports across the Ivies and beyond support the common knowledge logic that only alumni and their parents generally give back to universities (and have a reason to), especially well-funded ones. In philanthropy and general, it is highly unusual to donate anything, especially a large amount, to a university without a relationship or connection to it.

A spokesperson for Kushner Companies denied the allegation of a relationship between the gift and the admission, and stated that Charles and Seryl Kushner have donated over US$100 million to other causes, related to the family and their interests, i.e. schools they’ve attended, building renamings in their hometown, and associated political candidates.

== Controversy ==
Development cases are controversial because they influence college acceptance decisions in non-transparent ways. The use of development cases has been compared to racial and legacy preferences because large donors tend to be from non-diverse backgrounds. Schools and admissions officers have defended their use of development cases because admitting a few weak students who will bring in excessive donor money benefits the other students at the school. Alumni contributions are a significant part of voluntary donation, with $7.1 billion contributed in 2004–05, accounting for 28% of all voluntary support. An extensive analysis of donor giving concluded that some donations were made with the hope of a higher admissions probability for a child.

Daniel Golden, a Pulitzer Prize-winning journalist at The Wall Street Journal with a B.A. from Harvard, is probably the most vocal writer on the topic. He has published several articles and a book on the topic. His articles have drawn responses from universities such as Duke, which was specifically named in several of the articles, as well as Kushner Companies in response to Golden's addressing of Jared Kushner in the book.

== See also ==
- Legacy preferences
