= Diana Sugg =

American journalist and editor

- Born: Diana K. Sugg
- Education: Villanova University; Ohio State University
- Occupations: Journalist; editor
- Spouse: Albert Wu (m. 2004)
- Children: 2
- Awards: Pulitzer Prize for Beat Reporting (2003)

Diana K. Sugg is a journalist and editor at The Baltimore Sun. Her work covering healthcare and medicine earned her the Pulitzer Prize for Beat Reporting in 2003.

== Biography ==
Sugg was raised in a large family in Rockville, Maryland where she is the third of six children. She graduated Phi Beta Kappa in 1987 from Villanova University, where she was an editor of the student newspaper The Villanovan. She earned a master's degree in investigative journalism from Ohio State University on a Kiplinger Fellowship in 1992.

Before joining The Baltimore Sun, Sugg was a reporter with the Associated Press in Philadelphia, the Spartanburg Herald-Journal in South Carolina, and the Sacramento Bee. In 1990, while covering crime in Sacramento, Sugg collapsed and has since battled strokes and seizures.

Sugg married Albert Wu, an internist and public health researcher, on February 14, 2004. They have two sons, and currently live near Baltimore.

== Awards ==
Sugg won the 2003 Pulitzer Prize in Beat Reporting on April 8, 2003. The Pulitzer committee noted her "absorbing, often poignant stories that illuminated complex medical issues through the lives of people." Sugg's recognized beat reporting work included pieces on stillbirth, sepsis, and the controversial practice of allowing patient families to be present during patient resuscitation efforts.
