= Spy Schools =

2017 book by Daniel Golden

- First edition
- Author: Daniel Golden
- Language: English
- Genre: Non-fiction
- Publisher: Henry Holt and Company
- Publication date: 2017
- Publication place: United States

Spy Schools: How the CIA, FBI and Foreign Intelligence Secretly Exploit America’s Universities is a 2017 book by Daniel Golden, published by Henry Holt and Company. It describes relations between American educational institutions and the U.S. intelligence community.

== Background ==
Golden stated that he was inspired to write this book after he learned of how the FBI tried to persuade a Chinese–American academic to do espionage against China, and how he learned such situations were more common than Golden realized.

== Content ==
The book examines particular instances of spying in the initial section and on foreign intelligence agencies intervention in educational institutions and their students from outside of the United States in the second part. Operations by both the Central Intelligence Agency (CIA) and the Federal Bureau of Investigation (FBI) are documented in this book. The book also includes the Glenn Duffie Shriver case.

== Reception ==
Ed J. Hagerty of American Public University System criticized the "overall quality of the research" as the book mainly used popular journalism and other sources that the public could access as its primary sources, but praised the interview material that Hagerty stated "elevates the book to a higher level".

Kirkus Reviews described the book as "provocative".

== See also ==
- The Price of Admission - Another book by Golden
