= Stieber =

Stieber is a surname. Notable people with the surname include:

- András Stieber (born 1991), Hungarian footballer
- Logan Stieber (born 1991), American amateur wrestler
- Mercédesz Stieber (born 1974), Hungarian water polo player
- Raymond Stieber (1936–2025), French footballer
- Sarolta Stieber (1905–1985), Hungarian swimmer
- Tamar Stieber, American journalist
- Wilhelm Stieber (1818–1882), Prussian spy
- Zoltán Stieber (born 1988), Hungarian footballer
