= De Rucci =

Chinese mattress company

De Rucci Healthy Sleep Co.
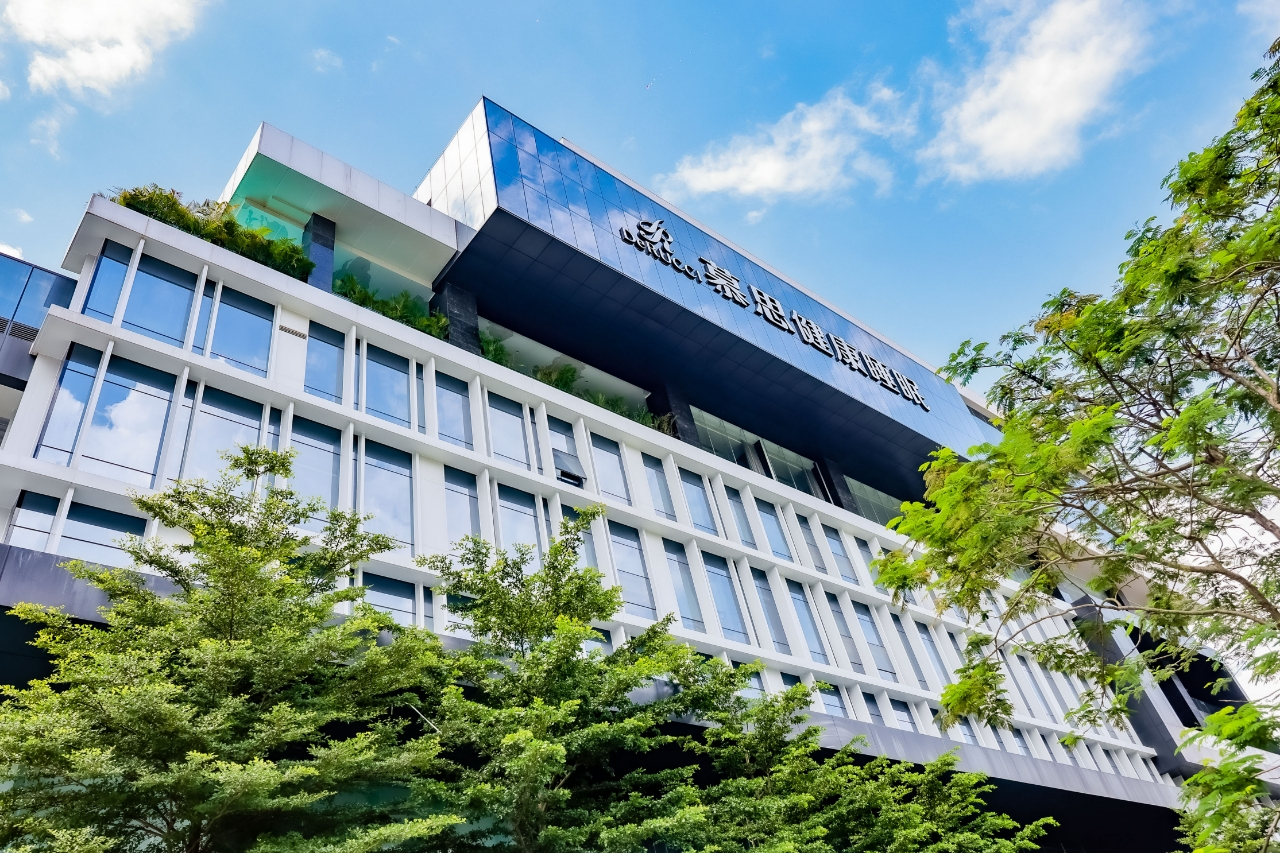
- DeRUCCI headquarters in Dongguan China
- Chinese: 慕思健康睡眠股份有限公司
Transcriptions
Standard Mandarin
- Hanyu Pinyin: Mùsī Jiànkāng Shuìmián Gǔfènyǒuxiàngōngsī
Yue: Cantonese
- Jyutping: mou6 si1 gin6 hong1 seoi6 min4 gu2 fan6*2 jau5 haan6 gung1 si1

De Rucci Healthy Sleep Co. (Chinese: 慕思; pinyin: Mùsī; Jyutping: mou6 si1) is a mattress company in China, headquartered in Dongguan, Guangdong.

== History ==
Lin Jiyong and Wang Bingkun established the firm in 2004. Its first offices were in Dongguan. It had 4,200 shops in China in 2020, as well as various showcase facilities outside of China.

== Branding and controversy ==
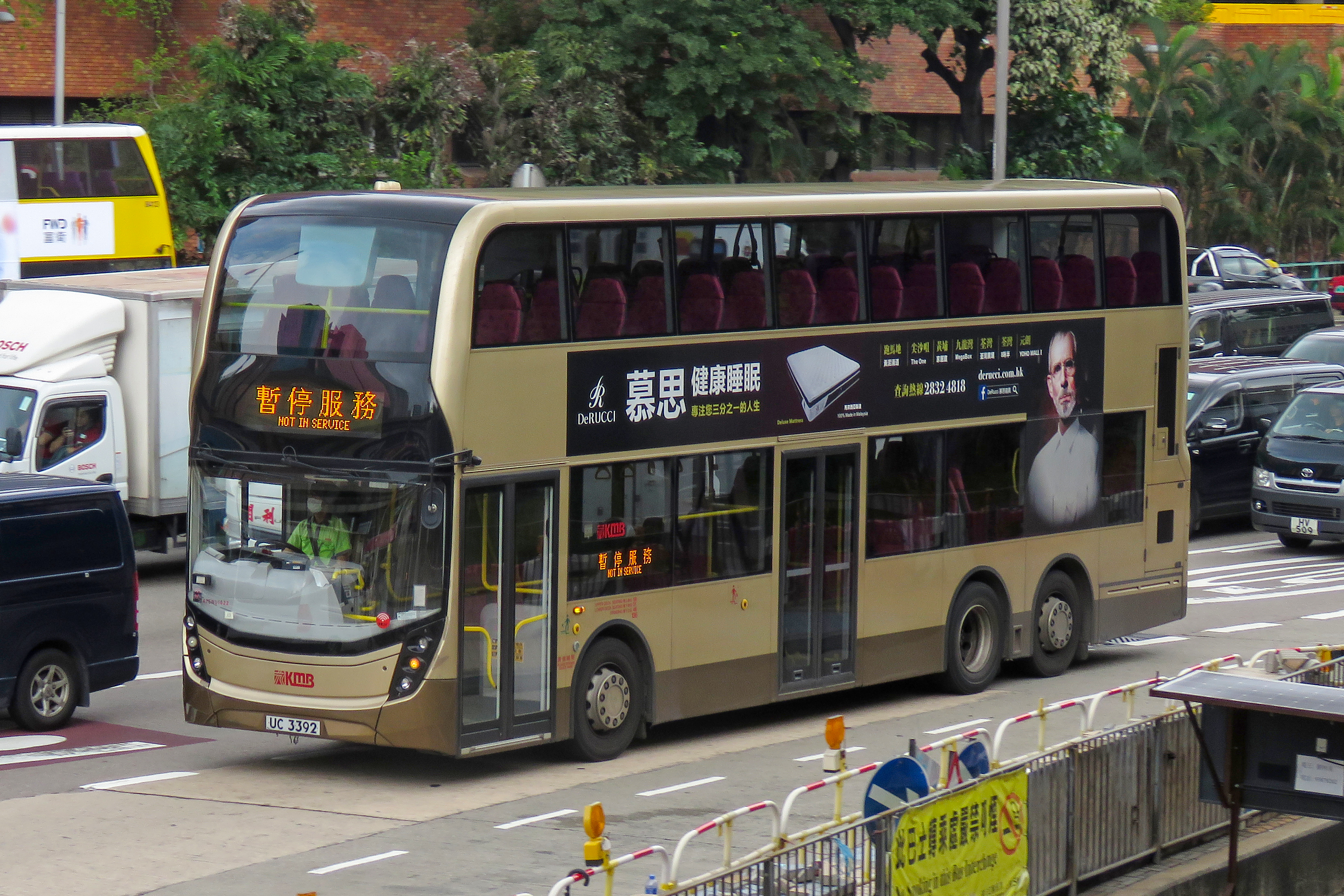
De Rucci advertisement on a bus in Hong Kong, featuring Dirstine

De Rucci previously claimed to have been founded in 1868 by a French-Italian man named Leonardo de Rucci. De Rucci's advertising prominently showcases an unnamed European-looking man, a "Steve Jobs look-alike" who has been described as the "most famous face in China". A Wall Street Journal investigation identified the man as John Timothy Dirstine (1943-2012), an American resident in China, and that De Rucci had signed an agreement with him in 2009 to use his image in advertising.

In 2021 China Daily criticized the usage of his face to suggest a non-Chinese origin for the company. The author of the article, Zhang Zhouxiang, stated "such blind worship is uncalled for in China now that it has become the world's second-largest economy." David Fickling of Bloomberg News argued that the usage of the man of European origin and European-inspired branding reflected an internalized inferiority felt in China, similar to that felt by people in Japan in the mid-20th century, before the rise of the Japanese economy.
