= Paul Ingrassia (journalist) =

American journalist (1950–2019)

Paul Joseph Ingrassia (August 18, 1950 – September 16, 2019) was an American Pulitzer Prize-winning journalist who served as managing editor of Reuters from 2011 to 2016. He was also an editor at the Revs Institute, an automotive history and research center in Naples, Florida, and the (co-)author of three books. He was awarded the Gerald Loeb Lifetime Achievement Award for financial journalism.

== Early life and education ==
Ingrassia was born in Laurel, Mississippi, to Angelo and Regina (née Iacono) Ingrassia. His father was a research chemist while his mother was a homemaker. He obtained degrees in journalism from the University of Illinois at Urbana–Champaign (bachelor's, 1972) and the University of Wisconsin–Madison (master's). Between 1968 and 1972 he worked at the award-winning salaried student-run Daily Illini in Urbana-Champaign, Illinois, where he sat as editor-in-chief from 1971-72 and oversaw an iconic typographic redesign of the paper.

== Career ==
In 1973, after graduating and leaving the Daily Illini, Ingrassia began working for a Lindsay-Schaub Newspaper Group in Decatur, Illinois, and in 1977 he moved to The Wall Street Journal in Chicago. In December 2007, Ingrassia completed a 31-year career at The Wall Street Journal and its parent company, Dow Jones, where he served as a reporter, editor, and executive.

Prior to his appointment as managing editor of Reuters in December 2012, Ingrassia had been deputy editor-in-chief of Thomson Reuters since April 2011, where he directed content creation across regions and specialty beats, in text and multimedia.

Over the years he taught as an adjunct professor at the Graduate School of Journalism at Columbia University and lectured at the business schools at Columbia and the University of Michigan.

From 1998 to 2006, Ingrassia was president of Dow Jones Newswires, and from 2006-2007 the company's vice president for news strategy.

Ingrassia was also author or co-author of three books, and wrote extensively about the auto industry for more than 30 years. His third and most recent book, published by Simon and Schuster in May 2012, was Engines of Change: A History of the American Dream in Fifteen Cars. It was described by Michiko Kakutani in The New York Times as “a highly informed but breezy narrative history of the vehicles that have shaped and reflected American culture.”

His previous book (Random House, January 2010) was Crash Course: The American Automobile Industry's Road from Glory to Disaster, which chronicled the 2008–2009 bankruptcies and bailouts of General Motors and Chrysler. The book was the basis for Live Another Day, a 2016 documentary film about the bailouts.

As the Wall Street Journal's Detroit bureau chief from 1985 to 1994, Ingrassia won a 1993 Pulitzer Prize—along with his deputy, Joseph B. White—for coverage of the boardroom revolt at General Motors. They also received the Gerald Loeb Award that year in the Deadline and/or Beat Writing category for the same coverage. The following year, Ingrassia and White wrote Comeback: The Fall and Rise of the American Automobile Industry.

Ingrassia's broadcast appearances included Meet the Press, CNBC, National Public Radio, CBS Sunday Morning, ABC's 20/20, Newshour, and The Daily Show with Jon Stewart. His work also appeared in the Nihon Keizei Shimbun of Japan, Newsweek, Institutional Investor, and other publications. He was a member of the Dow Jones Special Committee, which was established in 1997 to monitor the editorial integrity of The Wall Street Journal after the newspaper and its parent company were sold to Rupert Murdoch's News Corporation.

== Climate change ==
Ingrassia, a self-described climate change skeptic, drew media attention in 2013 when a former Reuters reporter accused him of suppressing the news organization's coverage on the topic; one study showed that Reuters's coverage of climate change fell by nearly 50% in the year after Ingrassia was hired.

== Personal life and death ==
External videos
- After Words interview with Lawrence Ingrassia on A Fatal Inheritance: How a Family Misfortune Revealed a Deadly Medical Mystery, about the Ingrassia family's experiences with cancer, June 21, 2024, C-SPAN

Ingrassia was a multiple cancer survivor due to a rare genetic condition that made him, and others with the condition, susceptible to malignancies. In accepting the Gerald Loeb Lifetime Achievement Award in June 2016, he thanked the judges for their recognition and added that, due to his health history, “I often think that my biggest lifetime achievement is simply having a lifetime.”

Paul Ingrassia and his wife, Susan, lived in Naples, Florida, and had three adult sons. One of his sons, Charlie, died of cancer in February 2019.

Paul Ingrassia's brother Larry Ingrassia is also a journalist.

Ingrassia died on September 16, 2019, from cancer.

== Other sources ==
- Comeback: the fall and rise of the American automobile industry (2nd ed 1995) by Paul Ingrassia and Joseph B. White; online
- Columbia University School of Journalism, Faculty biographies
- Amazon author biography
