= White monkey =

Hiring of white foreigners in China

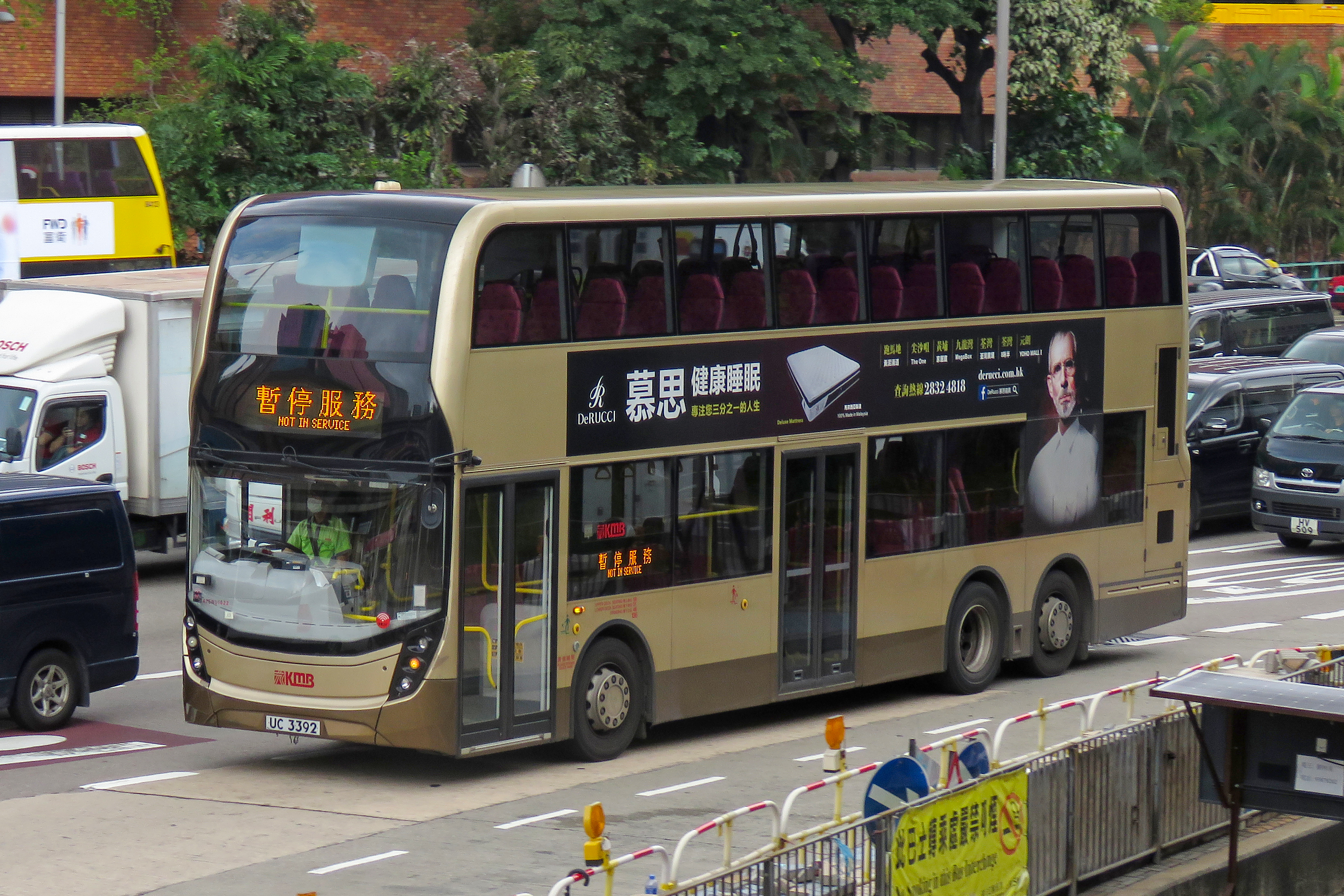
Advertisement for a Chinese brand (De Rucci) featuring an American model, on a bus in Hong Kong

White monkey (Chinese: 白猴子; pinyin: Bái hóuzi) is a term for the phenomenon of white foreigners or immigrants in China being hired for modeling, advertising, English teaching, or promotional jobs on the basis of their race. The phenomenon is based on the perception that association with foreigners, specifically white foreigners, can signify prestige, legitimacy, and international status. The jobs themselves, called "white monkey jobs" or "white-face jobs", often require little actual work on the part of the model, who in some cases is not expected to be fluent in Chinese. The concept is considered a subset of a larger "rent a foreigner" industry in China and other parts of Asia.

White monkey jobs are often related to marketing and advertising. The "white monkey" may be hired to act as an associate of an individual or pose as an authoritative figure to promote a brand or company, and businesses will occasionally hire these individuals to pose as a founder or executive.

While the concept is less viable in larger urban areas with more international exposure, the practice is common in smaller urban centers and rural areas, especially those trying to expand or attract real-estate attention by feigning an international presence.

== Legality ==
Hiring foreigners in China in this way is not regulated by law. There are risks for foreigners who model in this way while not having the right type of work visa.

== Notable examples ==
Advertising for De Rucci, a Chinese mattress company, prominently showcases an American man who has been described as the "most famous face in China".
