= Daniel Golden =

American journalist (born 1957)

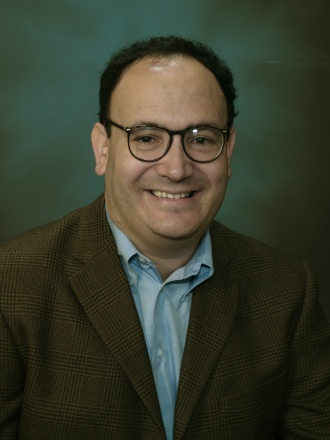
- Born: Daniel L. Golden; 1957 (age 68–69); Toledo, Ohio, U.S.
- Education: Harvard College (BA)
- Occupation: Journalist
- Awards: Pulitzer Prize for Beat Reporting (2004)

Daniel L. Golden (born 1957) is an American journalist, working as a senior editor and reporter for ProPublica since 2016. He was previously senior editor at Conde Nast's now-defunct Portfolio magazine, and a managing editor for Bloomberg News.

== Early life and education ==
Born in Toledo, Ohio, Golden grew up in an academic family, as his parents Morris and Hilda Golden were both professors who would later teach at the University of Massachusetts Amherst. Daniel Golden graduated from Harvard College in 1978 with a B.A.

== Journalism career ==
From 1978 to 1981, Golden was a reporter for the Springfield Daily News in Springfield, Massachusetts. In 1981, Golden first joined The Boston Globe as a regional reporter, being promoted to general assignment and investigative reporter in 1982. From 1986 to 1993, Golden wrote for the Globe's Sunday "Focus" section and weekly magazine. After a year as an investigative reporter, Golden was a special projects reporter for the Globe from 1994 until leaving in 1998. He attended Stanford University in 1998-99 as a Knight Journalism Fellow.

Golden joined The Wall Street Journal as a reporter in 1999. Beginning in 2000, Golden was the Boston deputy bureau chief for the Journal.

As Deputy Bureau Chief at the Boston bureau of The Wall Street Journal he received the Pulitzer Prize for Beat Reporting in 2004 for a series of articles on admissions preferences in elite American universities, specifically relating to the enormous advantages enjoyed by more affluent white students, and the use of development cases (admissions based on potential donations). He earned the 2011 Gerald Loeb Award for Beat Reporting for his article "Education Inc.". Golden is also a three time recipient of the George Polk Award.

A series of articles that Golden edited about Corporate Tax Inversions won Bloomberg's first Pulitzer Prize in 2015. Golden also co-edited a ProPublica series on Latin American asylum-seekers caught between the U.S. government and the MS-13 gang, which won the 2019 Pulitzer Prize for feature writing.

== Books ==
- The Price of Admission: How America's Ruling Class Buys Its Way into Elite Colleges—and Who Gets Left Outside the Gates, Three Rivers Press, 2007.
- Spy Schools: How the CIA, FBI, and Foreign Intelligence Secretly Exploit America's Universities, Henry Holt and Co., 2017.
- The Ransomware Hunting Team: A Band of Misfits' Improbable Crusade to Save the World from Cybercrime, Farrar, Straus and Giroux, 2022. – with Renee Dudley
