= Michael Hiltzik =

American columnist and reporter (born 1952)

Michael A. Hiltzik
- Born: November 9, 1952 (age 73); New York City, U.S.
- Education: Colgate University (BA); Columbia University Graduate School of Journalism (MS)
- Occupations: Journalist, foreign correspondent, columnist, editor, blogger, author
- Spouse: Deborah Ibert
- Children: Andrew, David
- Writing career
- Notable awards: Gerald Loeb Award for Distinguished Business and Financial Journalism 1985 2004; Pulitzer Prize 1999

Michael A. Hiltzik (born November 9, 1952) is an American columnist, reporter and author who has written extensively for the Los Angeles Times. In 1999, he won a beat reporting Pulitzer Prize for co-writing a series of articles about corruption in the music industry with Chuck Philips. He won two Gerald Loeb Awards for Distinguished Business and Financial Journalism.

== Career ==
Hiltzik was a journalist at the Buffalo Courier-Express in (Buffalo, New York) in 1974–1978 . He was a staff writer at the Providence Journal-Bulletin (Providence, Rhode Island) 1979–1981. He joined The Los Angeles Times as a financial writer from 1981 to 1983 and was its financial correspondent in New York City 1982–1988, Nairobi bureau chief 1988–1993, Moscow correspondent 1993–1994. He was a financial staff writer, editor, and columnist at the Times 1994–2006. More recently, he began writing a column about business and economic issues in the US West Coast.

In 1985, Hiltzik shared a Gerald Loeb Award Honorable Mention for Large Newspapers for "Takeovers". He won Silver Gavel award from the American Bar Association and the Overseas Press Club cited his reporting on East African issues. In 1996 he was a finalist for two Pulitzer Prizes for his reporting on health care issues in California and his reporting on a major entertainment merger between Disney and ABC.

Along with Times staff writer Chuck Philips, Hiltzik won the 1999 Pulitzer Prize for their series on corruption and bribes in the music industry. The year-long series exposed corruption in the music business in three different areas: The Academy of Recording Arts and Sciences raised money for an ostensible charity that netted only pennies on the dollar for its charity; radio station "payola", for airplay of new recordings; and the proliferation of exploitive and poorly conceived medical detox programs for celebrities. Mark Saylor, then entertainment editor of the business section of the paper, said it was gratifying because it recognized "aggressive reporting on the hometown industry . . . where The LA Times has long labored under a cloud, the misperception that ...[they]... were soft on the entertainment industry". The series led to the removal of C. Michael Green, then Grammy chief.

In 2004, Hiltzik won a Gerald Loeb Award for Commentary.

In 2006, Hiltzik was suspended without pay from the LA Times for sockpuppeting on his blog "The Golden State". Hiltzik admitted to posting under false names on multiple sites, using the pseudonym "Mikekoshi" to criticize commentators Hugh Hewitt and Patrick Frey. In December 2009, the LA Times announced that Hiltzik would be returning to the paper as a business columnist.

In January 2022, Hiltzik was criticized for a column where he encouraged public humiliation of unvaccinated people who died from COVID-19. He said, "mockery is not necessarily the wrong reaction to those who publicly mocked anti-COVID measures and encourage others to follow suit, before they perished of the disease the dangers of which they belittled".

== Books ==
- A death in Kenya : the murder of Julie Ward. New York, N.Y.: Delacorte Press. 1991. ISBN 0-385-30191-X. LCCN 90027198.
- Dealers of lightning : Xerox PARC and the dawn of the computer age (1st ed.). New York: HarperBusiness. 1999. ISBN 0-88730-891-0. LCCN 98047043.
- The plot against Social security : how the Bush administration is endangering our financial future (1st ed.). New York, N.Y.: HarperCollinsPublishers. 2005. ISBN 0-06-083465-X. LCCN 2005046132.
- Colossus : Hoover Dam and the making of the American century. New York: Free Press. 2010. ISBN 978-1-4165-3216-3. LCCN 2009033833.
- The New Deal: A Modern History. New York: Free Press. 2011. ISBN 978-1-4391-5448-9.
- Big Science: Ernest Lawrence and the Invention that Launched the Military-Industrial Complex. Simon & Schuster. 2015. ISBN 978-1451675757.
- Iron Empires: Robber Barons, Railroads, and the Making of Modern America. New York: Houghton Mifflin Harcourt. 2020. ISBN 9780544770348.
- Golden State: The Making of California. New York: HarperCollins, 2025. ISBN 978-0-358-53934-6.

=== Radio interviews ===
Hiltzik has been interviewed about internet privacy matters on talk radio shows such as the Norman Goldman Show.
