= Don Bartletti =

American photojournalist

- Born: December 29, 1947 (age 78); Philadelphia, Pennsylvania, U.S.
- Education: Palomar College
- Occupation: Photojournalist

Don Bartletti (December 29, 1947) is an American photojournalist who worked for the Los Angeles Times from 1984 to 2015. He won the Pulitzer Prize in 2003 for feature photography.

== Biography ==
Bartletti was born in 1947 in Philadelphia, Pennsylvania, and he received his Associate of Arts degree in 1968 from Palomar College. He served as a First Lieutenant in the U.S. Army in Vietnam from 1968-1971.

Bartletti worked as a photographer with the Oceanside Blade-Tribune until 1977, then with the San Diego Union until 1983. He joined the Los Angeles Times as a photographer in 1983.

== Awards ==
Bartletti won the Pulitzer Prize for his "photo essays about young Central American migrants" in 2003, and he became a finalist for his photo series on Mexican farmworkers in 2015. He won more than 40 awards, including the San Diego Press Club, Los Angeles Press Club, National Press Photographers Assn., AP, UPI, and the Los Angeles Times Editorial Award.
