= Tamar Stieber =

American journalist

Tamar Stieber is an American journalist who won the 1990 Pulitzer Prize for Specialized Reporting. Her coverage revealed a correlation between the drug L-tryptophan and a rare blood disorder. As a result of her reporting, the Food and Drug Administration recalled the dietary supplement.

In 1993, Stieber sued the Albuquerque Journal for unfair treatment and gender discrimination. The United States District Court for the District of New Mexico ruled in favor of the Journal and an appellate court upheld the decision.

== 1990 Pulitzer Prize ==
Stieber won the Pulitzer Prize in 1990 for Specialized Reporting. A freshman reporter who had only started at the Journal one year prior, she first reported that three doctors in New Mexico had noticed a link between their patients' rare blood disorders and their use of the dietary supplement L-tryptophan. Both doctors and state officials were skeptical and resistant to cooperating with the reporting. After Stieber's articles were published, over 300 cases of the potentially fatal disorder were discovered in 38 states, including the District of Columbia. The FDA subsequently announced a nationwide class I recall of L-tryptophan.

Stieber was the first reporter from New Mexico to win a Pulitzer Prize.

== 1993 lawsuit ==
After winning the Pulitzer, Stieber received nominal promotions from the Albuquerque Journal but suffered from alleged "discrimination in salary, assignments, and opportunities for advancement." Stieber filed a gender bias complaint with the Equal Employment Opportunity Commission, then sued the Albuquerque Journal.

The suit alleged that in May 1992, Stieber's pay was still $8,500 less than the average pay of three male investigative reporters, none of whom had won a Pulitzer Prize. The Journal alleged that some of Stieber's stories were erroneously reported and that she was using company resources to sue the newspaper. She resigned from the Albuquerque Journal in October 1994.

In April 1995, a federal jury ruled in favor of the Albuquerque Journal. On October 23, 1997, the U.S. Court of Appeals for the Tenth Circuit upheld the jury's decision.
