= Lou Kilzer =

American journalist (1951–2024)

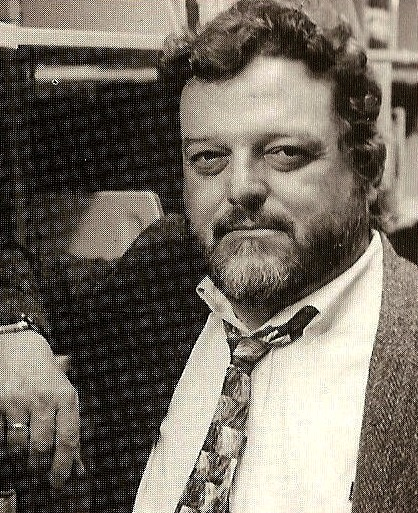
- Born: February 10, 1951; Cody, Wyoming, U.S.
- Died: March 27, 2024 (aged 73); Colorado Springs, Colorado, U.S.
- Spouse: Liz Kovacs
- Children: Alex, Xanthe
- Writing career
- Notable works: Churchill's Deception; Hitler's Traitor; Fatal Redemption; Fatal Seductions
- Notable awards: Pulitzer Prize Gold Medal for the Denver Post in 1986 with Diana Griego. Pulitzer Prize Investigative Reporting, 1990.

Lou Kilzer (February 10, 1951 – March 27, 2024) was an American investigative journalist and author and a two time Pulitzer Prize Winner.

== Career ==
=== Journalism ===
Kilzer began work as a journalist in 1973 after graduating cum laude in philosophy from Yale University, joining the Rocky Mountain News in December 1977. He covered police, courts and investigations. In 1983, he began a five-year stint on the investigations unit and city desk of the Denver Post, and then seven years on the investigative unit of the Minneapolis Star-Tribune.

In 1986, Kilzer and two other Denver Post reporters won for that newspaper a Pulitzer Prize for Public Service for a series that debunked the notion that millions of small American children were being kidnapped each year by strangers.

Kilzer and another Minneapolis Star-Tribune reporter won a Pulitzer for investigative reporting in 1990 for articles exposing how top officials at the Saint Paul Fire Department were profiting from the arson industry. He has also won over a dozen national journalism awards, including the George Polk Award for National Reporting, and the IRE award for investigative journalism.

In 1994, Kilzer returned to the Denver Post as investigations editor, followed by five years as investigative reporter where he had begun his career: Rocky Mountain News. Kilzer covered the insider stock trading by Qwest CEO Joe Nacchio and appeared before his stock fraud indictment and conviction. In 2008, Kilzer accepted the job of editor-in-chief of the JoongAng Daily in Seoul, South Korea. The JoongAng Daily (now known as the Korea JoongAng Daily) is published in partnership with the International New York Times. Kilzer returned to the United States in 2010, taking a job on the investigative unit of the Pittsburgh Tribune-Review. He retired and moved with his wife, Liz, to Costa Rica where he pursued a book writing career.

In 2012 he won the William Brewster Styles Award given by the Society of American Business Editors and Writers for reporting on international money laundering. Kilzer won the award, together with fellow reporter Andrew Conte and Investigations Editor Jim Wilhelm for work published in the Pittsburgh Tribune-Review.

=== Books ===
Kilzer's 1994 book, Churchill's Deception, sought to prove that Great Britain tricked Germany into attacking the Soviet Union in 1941. It was published by Simon & Schuster. Kirkus Reviews called the book "an audacious rereading of the diplomatic history" of World War II," in which Kilzer argues "that Winston Churchill deliberately nurtured Hitler's illusion that powerful British factions sought an end to the war on terms favorable to Nazi Germany, and thus outwitted Hitler into starting a war against the Soviets that Germany could not win." The book maintains that Rudolf Hess's 1941 flight to Britain was a British intelligence operation, and that the man who died in Spandau Prison in 1987 was not Hess. Kirkus called the book "an absorbing and cogently argued original contribution to WW II literature." Booklist said historians would give the book "short shrift" because it was primarily derived from existing published works, and Library Journal described the Hess theory as "generally discredited."

His 2000 book Hitler's Traitor: Martin Bormann and the Defeat of the Reich contends that Germany's defeat was largely the result of the Red Orchestra spy ring that had penetrated the German High Command. The book contends that Martin Bormann, a top aide to Adolf Hitler, and Heinrich Müller, head of the Gestapo, were both Soviet agents. Publishers Weekly said that Kilzer "revisits this arena with an entertaining synthesis of evidence about the activities of these spies, extensive accounts of relevant military history, and informed speculations about causes and effects, motives and behaviors."

Kilzer's first book of fiction, co-authored with Mark Boyden, a British business consulting executive, is called "Fatal Redemption," published by Enigmas Publishing. "Fatal Redemption" won several national awards including the IRDA in 2015, the crime fiction award category for the Beverly Hills International Book Awards and the general fiction category of the 2015 Great Northwest Book Festival. Kilzer and Boyden wrote a series centering around a journalist named Sally Will. This includes the title, "Fatal Seductions."

== Personal life and death ==
Kilzer was born in Cody, Wyoming, the son of Robert and Marjorie Kilzer. He and his wife, Liz Kovacs, had two grown children. He died from various ongoing illnesses at his home in Colorado Springs, Colorado, on March 27, 2024. He was 73.

== Published works ==
- Kilzer, Lou, and Mark Boyden. Fatal Redemption: A Mystery Thriller. Enigmas Publishing, 2014. ISBN 9780992806804
- Kilzer, Lou, and Mark Boyden. Fatal Seductions: Second in the Sally Will series. Enigmas Publishing, 2015. ISBN 9780992806859
- Kilzer, Lou, and Sarah Huntley. Battered Justice. Denver, CO: Rocky Mountain News, 2005. OCLC 84154064
- Kilzer, Louis C. Hitler's Traitor: Martin Bormann and the Defeat of the Reich. Novato, CA: Presidio Press, 2000. ISBN 0891417109
- Kilzer, Louis C. Churchill's Deception: The Dark Secret That Destroyed Nazi Germany. New York: Simon & Schuster, 1994. ISBN 0671767224
