= Legacy preferences =

Preference given to applicants related to alumni

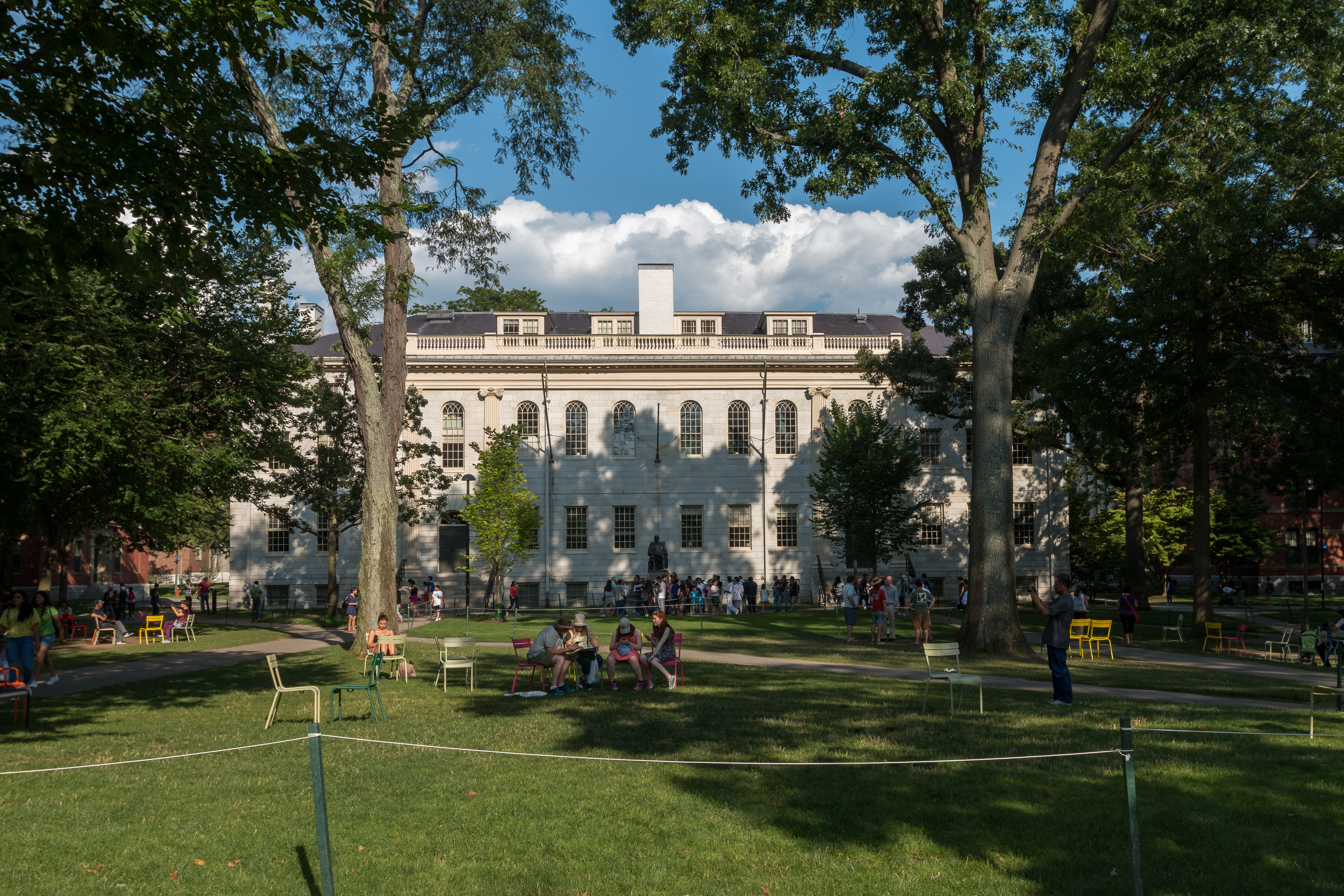
Between 2014 and 2019, Harvard University accepted legacy students at a rate of 33%—more than five times the percentage of Harvard University's 6% overall acceptance rate in the same period.

Legacy preference or legacy admission is a preference given by an institution or organization to certain applicants on the basis of their familial relationship to alumni of that institution. It is most controversial in college admissions, where students so admitted are referred to as legacies or legacy students. This form of nepotism is particularly widespread in the college admissions in the United States; almost three-quarters of research universities and nearly all liberal arts colleges grant legacy preferences in admissions.

Schools vary in how broadly they extend legacy preferences, with some schools granting this favor only to children of undergraduate alumni, while other schools extend the favor to extended family, including: children, grandchildren, siblings, nephews, and nieces of alumni of undergraduate and graduate programs. A 2005 analysis of 180,000 student records obtained from nineteen selective colleges and universities found that, within a set range of SAT scores, being a legacy raised an applicant's chances of admission by 19.7 percentage points.

Legacy preferences are controversial, as the legacy students tend to be less qualified and less racially diverse than non-legacy students. Legacy students also derive less value from attending a prestigious university. However, legacy students are economically beneficial to universities, as they are perceived to be more likely to donate to their university after graduation and have parents who are perceived to be more generous donors. Legacy preferences are particularly prevalent at Ivy League universities and other selective private universities in the United States.

== History ==
In the United States, legacy admissions in universities date back to the 1920s. Elite schools used legacy admissions to maintain spots for White Anglo-Saxon Protestants amid fears that Jews, Catholics and Asians were increasingly taking spots at the schools.

A 1992 survey found that of the top seventy-five universities in the U.S. News & World Report rankings, only one (the California Institute of Technology) had no legacy preferences at all; the Massachusetts Institute of Technology also affirmed that it does not practice legacy admissions. Legacy preferences were almost ubiquitous among the one hundred top-ranked liberal arts colleges as well. The only liberal arts college in the top one hundred that explicitly said it did not use legacy preferences was Berea.

Beginning in the 2010s, several top schools ended legacy preferences, including Johns Hopkins University in 2014, Pomona College in 2017, Amherst College in 2021, and Wesleyan University in 2023. By 2024, four states (Colorado, Maryland, Virginia, and California) had banned legacy admissions at universities.

In 2023, the bipartisan Merit-based Educational Reforms and Institutional Transparency Act was proposed in the U.S. Congress to ban legacy preferences.

== Current practices ==
Currently, the Ivy League institutions are estimated to admit 10% to 15% of each entering class using legacy admissions. For example, in the 2008 entering undergraduate class, the University of Pennsylvania admitted 41.7% of legacies who applied during the early decision admissions round and 33.9% of legacies who applied during the regular admissions cycle, versus 29.3% of all students who applied during the early decision admissions round and 16.4% of all who applied during the regular cycle. In 2009, Princeton admitted 41.7% of legacy applicants—more than 4.5 times the 9.2% rate of non-legacies. Similarly, in 2006, Brown University admitted 33.5% of alumni children, significantly higher than the 13.8% overall admissions rate. In short, Ivy League and other top schools typically admit legacies at two to five times their overall admission rates. Among top universities, the University of Notre Dame and Georgetown University are known to weigh legacy status heavily in their application processes.

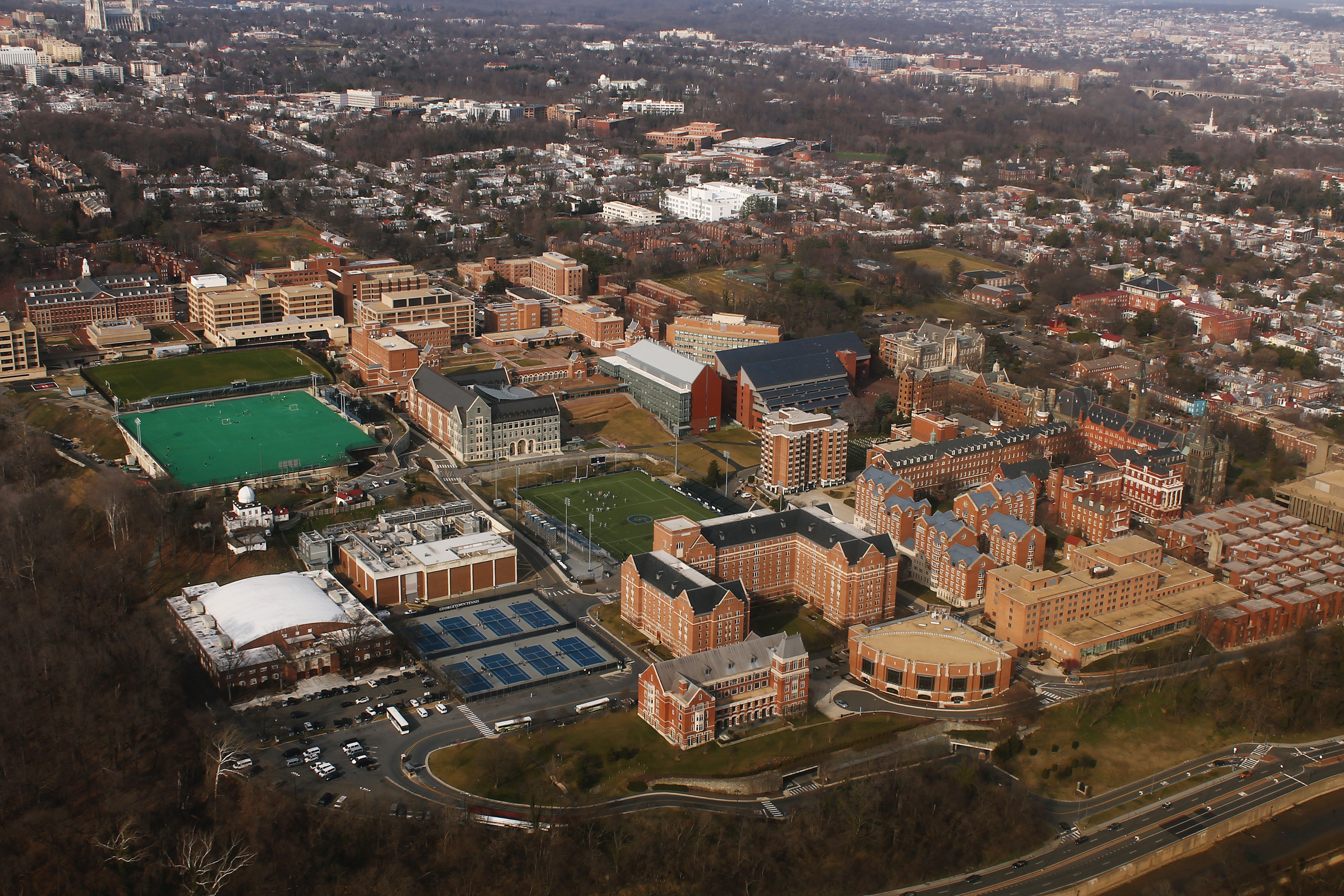
As of 2020, applicants to Georgetown University with legacy status are twice as likely as non-legacy applicants to be accepted

A 2019 National Bureau of Economic Research working paper by Peter Arcidiacono found that 43% of students admitted to Harvard College were either athletes, legacies, members of the "Dean's" or "Director's" lists of relations of donors or prominent figures, or children of university employees ("ALDCs"); fewer than 16% of ethnic minority Harvard undergraduate admits were ALDCs. Arcidiacono also found that almost 70% of Harvard legacy applicants were white. A similar study at an elite college found that legacies were almost twice as likely to be admitted as non-legacies and that legacy preferences increased the admission rates for white and wealthy students to the greatest degree.

The advantages that colleges offer legacy students extend well beyond admission preferences. Many colleges have various mechanisms for coaching legacies through the admissions process and for advising them about strategies for constructing successful applications, including notifying legacies of the advantage that they can gain by applying early. Some universities have alumni councils that provide legacies with special advising sessions, pair these prospective students with current legacy students, and generally provide advice and mentoring for legacy applicants. Some universities employ admissions counselors dedicated solely to legacy applicants, and it is common to provide scholarships or tuition discounts earmarked especially for legacies and for legacies to be charged in-state tuition fees when they are out-of-state residents. In cases where legacies are rejected, some universities offer legacy admissions counseling and help with placement at other colleges. Such students are often encouraged to enroll at a lesser ranked school for one or two years to prove themselves and then to reapply as transfer students. Because rankings by U.S. News & World Report and other media take into account only the SAT scores and high school grades of entering freshmen, a college can accept poor achieving legacies as transfer students without hurting its standing. Harvard caters to the children of well-connected alumni and big donors through the "Z-list." Z-listers are often guaranteed admittance while in high school but are obliged to take a year off between high school and Harvard, doing whatever they wish in the interim.

Former Harvard University president Lawrence Summers has stated, "Legacy admissions are integral to the kind of community that any private educational institution is." In the 1998 book The Shape of the River: Long-Term Consequences of Considering Race in College and University Admissions, authors William G. Bowen, former Princeton University president, and Derek Bok, former Harvard University president, found "the overall admission rate for legacies was almost twice that for all other candidates." While the preference is quite common in elite universities and liberal arts colleges, it is quite controversial, with 75% of Americans opposing the preference.

== Economic impact ==
Economists are divided over implications of the practice. A 2019 study of leading economists by the University of Chicago Booth School of Business (IGM Forum) found that 76% of economists responding surveyed either "strongly agreed" or "agreed" that legacy preferences crowds out applicants with greater academic potential. The economists were divided as to whether the existence of legacy admissions meant that universities had a less beneficial "net effect" on society than if there were no legacy admissions: 2% strongly agreed, 29% agreed, 40% were uncertain, 19% disagreed, and none strongly disagreed. (10% did not respond). Panelist David Autor commented that "There are clear costs + benefits, But the optics are terrible, which degrades public faith in ostensibly meritocratic institutions." Many economists noted that the effect of legacy admissions (or ending legacy admissions) was difficult to determine, given the unclear relationship (elasticity) between donations and admission of children and the unclear effects of legacy admissions on donations and class size/higher education capacity.

Some studies suggest legacy admissions practices marginally increase donations from alumni, though other analyses have disputed this conclusion.

== Demographic implications ==
Legacy admissions have significant implications for university demographics, often benefiting affluent and predominantly white applicants. Research highlights that these preferences perpetuate existing racial and socioeconomic disparities by granting admission advantages to the descendants of alumni, typically those who have historically had better access to higher education.

The practice has faced increased scrutiny, particularly in light of reduced affirmative action policies in the U.S. According to various sources, universities are being criticized around the country for prioritizing legacy admissions, directly contradicting efforts to diversify student populations and create equitable access. This contrast between the objectives of diversity policies and legacy preferences has prompted debates on the fairness of admission practices.

Legacy admissions have been characterized as a form of racial discrimination that upholds historical exclusion by maintaining systemic advantages. By favoring students whose family members attended the institution, legacy policies continue a tradition that indirectly marginalizes underrepresented communities that did not have the same historical opportunities.

Critics argue that the elimination or reform of legacy admissions could contribute to a more equitable admissions system. Removing these preferences would allow universities to prioritize candidates based on individual merit and achievement, better aligning with broader goals of inclusivity and access. While changes to these policies may face resistance from alumni groups, supporters of reform view them as necessary to address ingrained inequities in higher education. This shift could play a significant role in broadening educational access and fostering a more diverse academic environment.

== In comparison to other programs ==
At some schools, legacy preferences have an effect on admissions comparable to other programs such as athletic recruiting or affirmative action. One study of three selective private research universities in the United States showed the following effects (admissions disadvantage and advantage in terms of SAT points on the 1600-point scale):

- African Americans: +230
- Hispanics: +185
- Asians: -50
- Recruited athletes: +200
- Legacies (children of alumni): +160

Although it may initially appear that non-Asian students of color are the most favored of all the groups in terms of college admissions, in practice, widespread legacy preferences have reduced acceptance rates for black, Latino, and Asian-American applicants because the overwhelming majority of legacy students are white. According to a 2008 study, Duke's legacies are more likely to be white, Protestant, American citizens, and private high school graduates than the overall student body. In 2000-2001, of 567 alumni children attending Princeton, 10 were Latino and 4 were black. Similarly, a 2005 study reported that half of the legacy applicants to selective colleges boasted family incomes in the top quartile of American earnings, compared to 29% of non-legacy students. In 2003, Texas A&M—which no longer practices legacy admissions—enrolled 312 white students and only 27 Latino and 6 black students who would not have been admitted if not for their family ties. Since 1983, there have been formal complaints to the Education Department's Office for Civil Rights (OCR) that Asian-American applicants are being rejected in favor of students with lesser credentials.

In 1990, the OCR determined that Harvard had admitted legacies at twice the rate of other applicants, that in several cases legacy status "was the critical or decisive favor" in a decision to admit an applicant, and that legacy preferences help explain why 17.4% of white applicants were admitted compared with only 13.2% of Asian-American applicants during the previous decade. The OCR also found that legacies on average were rated lower than applicants who were neither legacies nor athletes in every important category (excluding athletic ability) in which applicants were judged.

In the 1990s, the University of California's Board of Regents voted to ban the use of affirmative action preferences throughout the system, and legacy privilege was abandoned across the University of California system soon after.

The Supreme Court upheld race-conscious admissions policies in its 2003 Grutter v. Bollinger decision, involving the University of Michigan's law school. The only significant criticism of legacy preferences from the Court came from Justice Clarence Thomas, the sole member of the Supreme Court who grew up in poverty.

While the majority of Americans have been shown to strongly oppose legacy admissions, its beneficiaries hold key positions in Congress and the judiciary, protecting this practice from political and legal challenge.

== Effect on alumni donations ==
While many schools say that a main reason for legacy preferences is to increase donations, at an aggregate (school-wide) level the decision to prefer legacies has not been shown to increase donations. However, in some instances, while alumni donations may go up if a child is intending on applying, donations fall if that child is rejected.

In 2008, alumni donations accounted for 27.5% of all donations to higher education in the U.S.

== Criticism ==
Because private universities in the U.S. rely heavily on donations from alumni, critics argue that legacy preferences are a way to indirectly sell university placement. Opponents accuse these programs of perpetuating an oligarchy and plutocracy as they lower the weight of academic merit in the admissions process in exchange for a financial one. Legacy students tend to be the white and wealthy, contributing to socioeconomic inequality.

Supporters of the elimination of all non-academic preferences point out that many European universities, including highly selective institutions such as Oxford, Cambridge, UCL and London School of Economics do not use legacy, racial, or athletic preferences in admissions decisions.

There are also legal arguments against legacy preferences. In public schools, legacy preferences may violate the Nobility Clause and the Equal Protection Clause of the U.S. Constitution by creating a hereditary privilege and discriminating on the basis of ancestry. Legacy preferences in both public and private universities may be illegal under the Civil Rights Act of 1866 (now codified in Section 1981 of the U.S. Code).

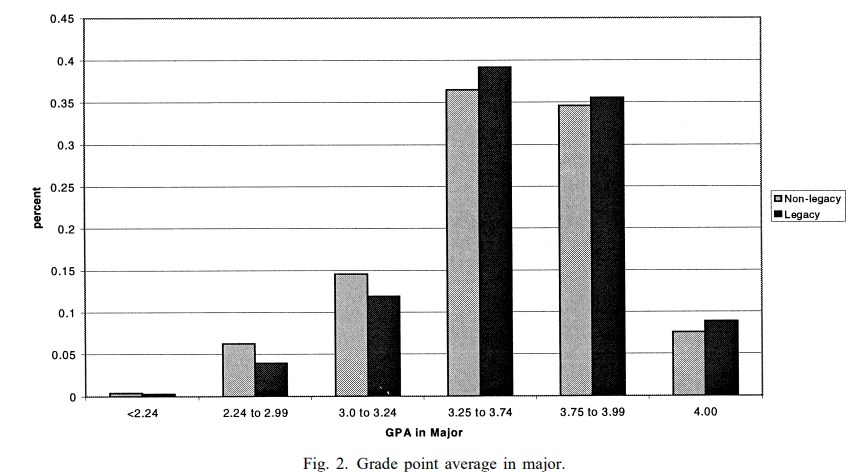
Distribution of GPA in college major by legacy status

At Harvard, legacies have higher median SAT test scores and grades than the rest of admitted students. According to The Atlantic, "While some research indicates that legacy admits go on to earn lower average grades than their peers, plenty are strong applicants."

In a paper published in Economics Letters, economist James Monks compared the academic performance of legacy students to that of non-legacy students from 27 private and selective colleges. Monks finds that legacies perform at least as well as their nonlegacy counterparts.

In admission data reviewed by The Daily Princetonian in 2023, the student newspaper found that legacy students had a higher GPA than non-legacy students except at the highest income levels, and were more likely to go into non-profit work after admission, and less likely to go on to graduate school.

== See also ==
- Affirmative action
- Class discrimination
- Development case
- Numerus clausus
- Old boy network
