= Pulitzer Prize for National Reporting =

American journalism award

This Pulitzer Prize has been awarded since 1942 for a distinguished example of reporting on national affairs in the United States. In its first six years (1942–1947), it was called the Pulitzer Prize for Telegraphic Reporting – National.

== List of winners for Pulitzer Prize for Telegraphic Reporting – National ==
Year	Name(s)	Publication	Rationale
1942	Louis Stark	The New York Times	"for his distinguished reporting of important labor stories during the year."
1943	No award		
1944	Dewey L. Fleming	The Baltimore Sun	"for his distinguished reporting during the year 1943."
1945	James Reston	The New York Times	"for his news dispatches and interpretive articles on the Dumbarton Oaks security conference."
1946	Edward A. Harris	St. Louis Post-Dispatch	"for his articles on the Tidewater Oil situation which contributed to the nationwide opposition to the appointment and confirmation of Edwin W. Pauley as Under Secretary of the Navy."
1947	Edward T. Folliard	The Washington Post	"for his series of articles published during 1946 on the Columbians, Inc."

== List of winners for Pulitzer Prize for National Reporting ==
Year	Name(s)	Publication	Rationale
1948	Bert Andrews	New York Herald Tribune	"for his articles on 'A State Department Security Case' published in 1947."
1948	Nat S. Finney	Minneapolis Tribune	"for his stories on the plan of the Truman administration to impose secrecy about the ordinary affairs of federal civilian agencies in peacetime."
1949	C. P. Trussell	The New York Times	"for consistent excellence covering the national scene from Washington."
1950	Edwin O. Guthman	The Seattle Times	"for his series on the clearing of Communist charges of Professor Melvin Rader, who had been accused of attending a secret Communist school."
1951	No award		
1952	Anthony Leviero	The New York Times	"for his exclusive article of April 21, 1951, disclosing the record of conversations between President Truman and General of the Army Douglas MacArthur at Wake Island in their conference of October 1950."
1953	Don Whitehead	Associated Press	"for his article called 'The Great Deception', dealing with the intricate arrangements by which the safety of President-elect Eisenhower was guarded en route from Morningside Heights in New York to Korea."
1954	Richard Wilson	The Des Moines Register	"for his exclusive publication of the FBI report to the White House in the Harry Dexter White case before it was laid before the Senate by J. Edgar Hoover."
1955	Anthony Lewis	Washington Daily News	"for publishing a series of articles which were adjudged directly responsible for clearing Abraham Chasanow, an employee of the U.S. Navy Department, and bringing about his restoration to duty with an acknowledgment by the Navy Department that it had committed a grave injustice in dismissing him as a security risk. Mr. Lewis received the full support of his newspaper in championing an American citizen, without adequate funds or resources for his defense, against an unjust act by a government department."
1956	Charles Bartlett	Chattanooga Times	"for his original disclosures that led to the resignation of Harold E. Talbott as Secretary of the Air Force."
1957	James Reston	The New York Times	"for his distinguished national correspondence, including both news dispatches and interpretive reporting, an outstanding example of which was his five-part analysis of the effect of President Eisenhower's illness on the functioning of the Executive Branch of the Federal Government."
1958	Clark Mollenhoff	The Des Moines Register	"for his persistent inquiry into labor racketeering, which included investigatory reporting of wide significance."
1958	Relman Morin	Associated Press	"for his dramatic and incisive eyewitness report of mob violence on September 23, 1957, during the integration crisis at the Central High School in Little Rock, Arkansas."
1959	Howard Van Smith	The Miami News	"for a series of articles that focused public notice on deplorable conditions in a Florida migrant labor camp, resulted in the provision of generous assistance for the 4,000 stranded workers in the camp, and thereby called attention to the national problem presented by 1,500,000 migratory laborers."
1960	Vance Trimble	Scripps-Howard Newspapers	"for a series of articles exposing the extent of nepotism in the Congress of the United States."
1961	Edward R. Cony	The Wall Street Journal	"for his analysis of a timber transaction which drew the attention of the public to the problems of business ethics."
1962	Nat Caldwell	The Nashville Tennessean	"for their exclusive disclosure and six years of detailed reporting, under great difficulties, of the undercover cooperation between management interests in the coal industry and the United Mine Workers."
1962	Gene Graham	The Nashville Tennessean	"for their exclusive disclosure and six years of detailed reporting, under great difficulties, of the undercover cooperation between management interests in the coal industry and the United Mine Workers."
1963	Anthony Lewis	The New York Times	"for his distinguished reporting of the proceedings of the United States Supreme Court during the year, with particular emphasis on the coverage of the decision in the reapportionment case and its consequences in many of the States of the Union."
1964	Merriman Smith	United Press International	"for his outstanding coverage of the assassination of President John F. Kennedy."
1965	Louis M. Kohlmeier Jr.	The Wall Street Journal	"for his enterprise in reporting the growth of the fortune of President Lyndon B. Johnson and his family."
1966	Haynes Johnson	The Washington Star	"for his distinguished coverage of the civil rights conflict centered about Selma, Ala., and particularly his reporting of its aftermath."
1967	Monroe Karmin	The Wall Street Journal	"for their investigative reporting of the connection between American crime and gambling in the Bahamas."
1967	Stanley Penn	The Wall Street Journal	"for their investigative reporting of the connection between American crime and gambling in the Bahamas."
1968	Nick Kotz	The Des Moines Register	"for his reporting of unsanitary conditions in many meat packing plants, which helped insure the passage of the federal Wholesome Meat Act of 1967."
1968	Howard James	The Christian Science Monitor	"for his series of articles, 'Crisis in the Courts.'"
1969	Robert Cahn	The Christian Science Monitor	"for his inquiry into the future of our national parks and the methods that may help to preserve them."
1970	William J. Eaton	Chicago Daily News	"for disclosures about the background of Judge Clement F. Haynsworth Jr., in connection with his nomination for the United States Supreme Court."
1971	Lucinda Franks	United Press International	"for their documentary on the life and death of 28-year-old revolutionary Diana Oughton: 'The Making of a Terrorist.'"
1971	Thomas Powers	United Press International	"for their documentary on the life and death of 28-year-old revolutionary Diana Oughton: 'The Making of a Terrorist.'"
1972	Jack Anderson	Syndicated columnist	"for his reporting of American policy decision-making during the Indo-Pakistan War of 1971."
1973	Robert Boyd	Knight Newspapers	"for their disclosure of Senator Thomas Eagleton's history of psychiatric therapy, resulting in his withdrawal as the Democratic vice presidential nominee in 1972."
1973	Clark Hoyt	Knight Newspapers	"for their disclosure of Senator Thomas Eagleton's history of psychiatric therapy, resulting in his withdrawal as the Democratic vice presidential nominee in 1972."
1974	Jack White	The Providence Journal and Evening Bulletin	"for his initiative in exclusively disclosing President Nixon's federal income tax payments in 1970 and 1971."
1974	James Polk	The Washington Star	"for his disclosure of alleged irregularities in the financing of the campaign to re-elect President Nixon in 1972."
1975	Donald L. Barlett	The Philadelphia Inquirer	"for their series 'Auditing the Internal Revenue Service,' which exposed the unequal application of federal tax laws."
1975	James B. Steele	The Philadelphia Inquirer	"for their series 'Auditing the Internal Revenue Service,' which exposed the unequal application of federal tax laws."
1976	James V. Risser	The Des Moines Register	"for disclosing large-scale corruption in the American grain exporting trade."
1977	Walter Mears	Associated Press	"for his coverage of the 1976 presidential campaign."
1978	Gaylord Shaw	Los Angeles Times	"for a series on unsafe structural conditions at the nation's major dams."
1979	James V. Risser	The Des Moines Register	"for a series on farming damage to the environment."
1980	Charles Stafford	St. Petersburg Times	"for their investigation of the Church of Scientology."
1980	Bette Swenson Orsini	St. Petersburg Times	"for their investigation of the Church of Scientology."
1980	Joseph Albright	Cox Newspapers	"for a series on energy."
1980	George Anthan	The Des Moines Register	"for a series on disappearing farmland."
1980	Staff	Los Angeles Times	"for a series on chemicals in the environment, 'Poisoning of America.'"
1981	John M. Crewdson	The New York Times	"for his coverage of illegal aliens and immigration."
1981	Donald L. Barlett	The Philadelphia Inquirer	"for their series 'Energy Anarchy.'"
1981	James B. Steele	The Philadelphia Inquirer	"for their series 'Energy Anarchy.'"
1981	Rick Edmonds	New York Daily News	"for their series on the state of U.S. military preparedness."
1981	Bob Herbert	New York Daily News	"for their series on the state of U.S. military preparedness."
1981	Alton Slagle	New York Daily News	"for their series on the state of U.S. military preparedness."
1981	Joseph Volz	New York Daily News	"for their series on the state of U.S. military preparedness."
1981	Ted Gup	The Washington Post	"for their series on government contracts."
1981	Jonathan Neumann	The Washington Post	"for their series on government contracts."
1982	Rick Atkinson	Kansas City Times	"for the uniform excellence of his reporting and writing on stories of national import."
1982	Rick Edmonds	The Philadelphia Inquirer	"for their series on live-birth abortions."
1982	Liz Jeffries	The Philadelphia Inquirer	"for their series on live-birth abortions."
1982	Staff	United Press International	"for its coverage of the attempted assassination of President Reagan."
1983	Staff	The Boston Globe	"for its balanced and informative special report on the nuclear arms race."
1983	Jim Henderson	Dallas Times Herald	"for his series on the persistence of racism in the 'New South' and, in a second nomination, for his reporting on the consequences of atomic testing in America."
1983	Haynes Johnson	The Washington Post	"for his reporting on the impact of the recession on communities across the nation."
1984	John Noble Wilford	The New York Times	"for reporting on a wide variety of scientific topics of national import."
1984	George Getschow	The Wall Street Journal	"for his series 'Dirty Work,' which disclosed the existence of temporary slave labor camps throughout the southwest United States."
1984	Benjamin Weiser	The Washington Post	"for his series on the difficulties doctors face in making life-and-death decisions regarding their patients."
1985	Tom Knudson	The Des Moines Register	"for his series of articles that examined the dangers of farming as an occupation."
1985	Robert Parry	Associated Press	"for his exclusive stories about the CIA's production of two manuals for Nicaraguan rebels—stories that led to an internal investigation and a congressional inquiry."
1985	Staff	The Wall Street Journal	"for its thorough coverage and analysis of the 1984 presidential campaign."
1986	Craig Flournoy	The Dallas Morning News	"for their investigation into subsidized housing in East Texas, which uncovered patterns of racial discrimination and segregation in public housing across the United States and led to significant reforms."
1986	George Rodrigue	The Dallas Morning News	"for their investigation into subsidized housing in East Texas, which uncovered patterns of racial discrimination and segregation in public housing across the United States and led to significant reforms."
1986	Arthur Howe	The Philadelphia Inquirer	"for his enterprising and indefatigable reporting on massive deficiencies in Internal Revenue Service (IRS) processing of tax returns-reporting that eventually inspired major changes in IRS procedures and prompted the agency to make a public apology to U.S. taxpayers."
1986	Hugh Aynesworth	Dallas Times Herald	"for their persistent and thorough investigation of self-proclaimed mass murderer Henry Lee Lucas, which exposed him as the perpetrator of a massive hoax."
1986	Jim Henderson	Dallas Times Herald	"for their persistent and thorough investigation of self-proclaimed mass murderer Henry Lee Lucas, which exposed him as the perpetrator of a massive hoax."
1987	Staff	Miami Herald	"for its exclusive reporting and persistent coverage of the U.S.-Iran-Contra connection."
1987	Staff	The New York Times	"for coverage of the aftermath of the Challenger explosion, which included stories that identified serious flaws in the shuttle's design and in the administration of America's space program."
1987	Bob Woodward	The Washington Post	"for articles that consistently exposed covert government operations in the Reagan administration."
1988	Tim Weiner	The Philadelphia Inquirer	"for his series of reports on a secret Pentagon budget used by the government to sponsor defense research and an arms buildup."
1988	George Anthan	The Des Moines Register	"for stories about contaminated poultry, which revealed deficiencies in USDA inspection procedures and prompted legislative action."
1988	Chuck Cook	The Washington Post	"for their series of articles that profiled corruption and mismanagement in federal Indian programs nationwide and helped generate a Senate investigation."
1988	Mike Masterson	The Washington Post	"for their series of articles that profiled corruption and mismanagement in federal Indian programs nationwide and helped generate a Senate investigation."
1988	Mark Trahant	The Washington Post	"for their series of articles that profiled corruption and mismanagement in federal Indian programs nationwide and helped generate a Senate investigation."
1988	Staff	The Atlanta Journal-Constitution	"for its series 'Divided We Stand,' about the resurgence of segregation in American schools."
1989	Donald L. Barlett	The Philadelphia Inquirer	"for their 15-month investigation of 'rifle shot' provisions in the Tax Reform Act of 1986, a series that aroused such widespread public indignation that Congress subsequently rejected proposals giving special tax breaks to many politically connected individuals and businesses."
1989	James B. Steele	The Philadelphia Inquirer	"for their 15-month investigation of 'rifle shot' provisions in the Tax Reform Act of 1986, a series that aroused such widespread public indignation that Congress subsequently rejected proposals giving special tax breaks to many politically connected individuals and businesses."
1989	Scot Lehigh	The Boston Phoenix	"for his insightful coverage of the presidential campaign of Massachusetts Governor Michael Dukakis."
1989	Matthew Purdy	The Philadelphia Inquirer	"for his reporting on abuses in America's kidney dialysis program."
1990	Ross Anderson	The Seattle Times	"for coverage of the Exxon Valdez oil spill and its aftermath."
1990	Bill Dietrich	The Seattle Times	"for coverage of the Exxon Valdez oil spill and its aftermath."
1990	Mary Ann Gwinn	The Seattle Times	"for coverage of the Exxon Valdez oil spill and its aftermath."
1990	Eric Nalder	The Seattle Times	"for coverage of the Exxon Valdez oil spill and its aftermath."
1990	Charles Babcock	The Washington Post	"for incisive reporting of abuses of power committed by members of Congress."
1990	Gilbert M. Gaul	The Philadelphia Inquirer	"for reporting that disclosed how the American blood industry operates with little governmental regulation or supervision."
1991	Marjie Lundstrom	Gannett News Service	"for reporting that disclosed hundreds of child abuse-related deaths go undetected each year as a result of errors by medical examiners."
1991	Rochelle Sharpe	Gannett News Service	"for reporting that disclosed hundreds of child abuse-related deaths go undetected each year as a result of errors by medical examiners."
1991	Bruce Butterfield	The Boston Globe	"for his series describing child labor abuses in nine states."
1991	Charles Green	Knight Ridder	"for a series examining the problems and failures of the Medicaid health care system."
1992	Mike McGraw	The Kansas City Star	"for their critical examination of the U.S. Department of Agriculture."
1992	Jeff Taylor	The Kansas City Star	"for their critical examination of the U.S. Department of Agriculture."
1992	Donald L. Barlett	The Philadelphia Inquirer	"for their series 'America: What Went Wrong?' which examined the public policy failures that have diminished the American middle class."
1992	James B. Steele	The Philadelphia Inquirer	"for their series 'America: What Went Wrong?' which examined the public policy failures that have diminished the American middle class."
1992	Maureen Dowd	The New York Times	"for her coverage of national politics and its personalities."
1993	David Maraniss	The Washington Post	"for his revealing articles on the life and political record of candidate Bill Clinton."
1993	Donald Drake	The Philadelphia Inquirer	"for their investigation of the pharmaceutical industry and its role in the soaring costs of prescription drugs in the United States."
1993	Marian Uhlman	The Philadelphia Inquirer	"for their investigation of the pharmaceutical industry and its role in the soaring costs of prescription drugs in the United States."
1993	Douglas Frantz	Los Angeles Times	"for documenting the clandestine effort of the U.S. government to supply money and weapons to Iraq in the 1980s and up to the weeks before the Gulf War."
1993	Murray Waas	Los Angeles Times	"for documenting the clandestine effort of the U.S. government to supply money and weapons to Iraq in the 1980s and up to the weeks before the Gulf War."
1994	Eileen Welsome	The Albuquerque Tribune	"for stories that related the experiences of American civilians who had been used unknowingly in government plutonium experiments nearly 50 years ago."
1994	Neill Borowski	The Philadelphia Inquirer	"for their investigation that identified rampant abuses of America's nonprofit tax laws."
1994	Gilbert M. Gaul	The Philadelphia Inquirer	"for their investigation that identified rampant abuses of America's nonprofit tax laws."
1994	Isabel Wilkerson	The New York Times	"for her coverage of the Midwestern flood of 1993 and other stories."
1995	Tony Horwitz	The Wall Street Journal	"for stories about working conditions in low-wage America."
1995	Stephen Seplow	The Philadelphia Inquirer	"for their stories about the origins and impact of violence in America."
1995	John Woestendiek	The Philadelphia Inquirer	"for their stories about the origins and impact of violence in America."
1995	David Zucchino	The Philadelphia Inquirer	"for their stories about the origins and impact of violence in America."
1995	David Shribman	The Boston Globe	"for his analytical reporting on Washington developments and the national scene."
1996	Alix M. Freedman	The Wall Street Journal	"for her coverage of the tobacco industry, including a report that exposed how ammonia additives heighten nicotine potency."
1996	Russell Carollo	Dayton Daily News	"for their reporting on lenient handling of sexual misconduct cases by the military justice system."
1996	Carol Hernandez	Dayton Daily News	"for their reporting on lenient handling of sexual misconduct cases by the military justice system."
1996	Jeff Nesmith	Dayton Daily News	"for their reporting on lenient handling of sexual misconduct cases by the military justice system."
1996	David Maraniss	The Washington Post	"for their accounts of the way the Republican takeover of the House of Representatives played out during 1995."
1996	Michael Weiskopf	The Washington Post	"for their accounts of the way the Republican takeover of the House of Representatives played out during 1995."
1997	Staff	The Wall Street Journal	"for its coverage of the struggle against AIDS in all of its aspects, the human, the scientific and the business, in light of promising treatments for the disease."
1997	Ron Brownstein	Los Angeles Times	"for his comprehensive political coverage during the presidential election year."
1997	Bill Moushey	Pittsburgh Post-Gazette	"for his resourceful reporting on the federal Witness Protection Program illustrating how the program's secrecy and lack of oversight has led to abuses and risks to the public."
1998	Russell Carollo	Dayton Daily News	"for their reporting that disclosed dangerous flaws and mismanagement in the military health care system and prompted reforms."
1998	Jeff Nesmith	Dayton Daily News	"for their reporting that disclosed dangerous flaws and mismanagement in the military health care system and prompted reforms."
1998	Douglas Frantz	The New York Times	"for his dogged reporting on the Church of Scientology, particularly its questionable relationship with the Internal Revenue Service, which granted the organization tax-exempt status."
1998	David Wood	Newhouse News Service	"for his fresh and revealing coverage of the U.S. military and the challenges facing it in the post-Cold War world."
1999	Jeff Gerth	The New York Times	"for a series of articles that disclosed the corporate sale of American technology to China, with U.S. government approval despite national security risks, prompting investigations and significant changes in policy."
1999	Staff	The New York Times	"for a series of articles that disclosed the corporate sale of American technology to China, with U.S. government approval despite national security risks, prompting investigations and significant changes in policy."
1999	Chris Adams	The Wall Street Journal	"for their reporting on the pitfalls faced by elderly Americans housed in commercial long-term facilities."
1999	Ellen Graham	The Wall Street Journal	"for their reporting on the pitfalls faced by elderly Americans housed in commercial long-term facilities."
1999	Michael Moss	The Wall Street Journal	"for their reporting on the pitfalls faced by elderly Americans housed in commercial long-term facilities."
1999	Staff	The Times-Picayune	"for a revealing series on the destruction of housing and the threat to the environment posed by the Formosan termite."
2000	Staff	The Wall Street Journal	"for its revealing stories that question U.S. defense spending and military deployment in the post-Cold War era and offer alternatives for the future."
2000	Cornelia Grumman	Chicago Tribune	"for their series on the growing lucrative privatization of jails and foster programs for troubled youths."
2000	David Jackson	Chicago Tribune	"for their series on the growing lucrative privatization of jails and foster programs for troubled youths."
2000	Anne Hull	St. Petersburg Times	"for her quietly powerful stories of Mexican women who come to work in North Carolina crab shacks, in pursuit of a better life."
2001	Staff	The New York Times	"for its compelling and memorable series exploring racial experiences and attitudes across contemporary America."
2001	Frank Fitzpatrick	The Philadelphia Inquirer	"for their series on the extreme commercialization of college sports."
2001	Gilbert M. Gaul	The Philadelphia Inquirer	"for their series on the extreme commercialization of college sports."
2001	Staff	Chicago Tribune	"for its comprehensive review of death penalty cases in Texas and nine other states that pointed out fundamental flaws in the system by which Americans are executed for crimes."
2002	Staff	The Washington Post	"for its comprehensive coverage of America's War on Terrorism, which regularly brought forth new information together with skilled analysis of unfolding developments."
2002	Douglas M. Birch	The Baltimore Sun	"for their series that suggested that university research on new drug therapies is being tainted by relationships with profit-seeking drug companies."
2002	Gary Cohn	The Baltimore Sun	"for their series that suggested that university research on new drug therapies is being tainted by relationships with profit-seeking drug companies."
2002	Gregory Vistica	The New York Times	"for his enterprising and nuanced reporting that disclosed Senator Bob Kerrey's role in a massacre during the Vietnam War."
2003	Alan Miller	Los Angeles Times	"for their revelatory and moving examination of a military aircraft, nicknamed 'The Widow Maker,' that was linked to the deaths of 45 pilots." (Note: Moved by the Pulitzer board from the Investigative Reporting category.)
2003	Kevin Sack	Los Angeles Times	"for their revelatory and moving examination of a military aircraft, nicknamed 'The Widow Maker,' that was linked to the deaths of 45 pilots."
2003	Anne Hull	The Washington Post	"for 'Rim of the New World,' her masterful accounts of young immigrants coming of age in the American South."
2003	Staff	Chicago Tribune	"for its engrossing exploration of the fall of Arthur Andersen, a once proud accounting firm."
2003	Staff	The Washington Post	"for its tenaciously reported and clearly written stories that exposed and explained corruption in corporate America."
2004	Nancy Cleeland	Los Angeles Times	"for its engrossing examination of the tactics that have made Wal-Mart the largest company in the world with cascading effects across American towns and developing countries."
2004	John Corrigan	Los Angeles Times	"for its engrossing examination of the tactics that have made Wal-Mart the largest company in the world with cascading effects across American towns and developing countries."
2004	Abigail Goldman	Los Angeles Times	"for its engrossing examination of the tactics that have made Wal-Mart the largest company in the world with cascading effects across American towns and developing countries."
2004	Evelyn Iritani	Los Angeles Times	"for its engrossing examination of the tactics that have made Wal-Mart the largest company in the world with cascading effects across American towns and developing countries."
2004	Tyler Marshall	Los Angeles Times	"for its engrossing examination of the tactics that have made Wal-Mart the largest company in the world with cascading effects across American towns and developing countries."
2004	Rick Wartzman	Los Angeles Times	"for its engrossing examination of the tactics that have made Wal-Mart the largest company in the world with cascading effects across American towns and developing countries."
2004	Staff	Los Angeles Times	"for its engrossing examination of the tactics that have made Wal-Mart the largest company in the world with cascading effects across American towns and developing countries."
2004	S. Lynne Walker	Copley News Service	"for her candid, in-depth look at how Mexican immigration transformed an all-white Midwestern town."
2004	Staff	The Wall Street Journal	"for its masterly, richly detailed stories on how hidden decision-makers make life-and-death choices about who gets health care in America."
2005	Walt Bogdanich	The New York Times	"for his heavily documented stories about the corporate cover-up of responsibility for fatal accidents at railway crossings."
2005	Erin Hoover Barnett	The Oregonian	"for their groundbreaking reports on the failure to curtail the growing illicit use of methamphetamines."
2005	Steve Suo	The Oregonian	"for their groundbreaking reports on the failure to curtail the growing illicit use of methamphetamines."
2005	Staff	The Washington Post	"for its relentless, unflinching chronicle of abuses by American soldiers at Abu Ghraib prison in Iraq."
2006	Eric Lichtblau	The New York Times	"for their carefully sourced stories on secret domestic eavesdropping that stirred a national debate on the boundary line between fighting terrorism and protecting civil liberty."
2006	James Risen	The New York Times	"for their carefully sourced stories on secret domestic eavesdropping that stirred a national debate on the boundary line between fighting terrorism and protecting civil liberty."
2006	Jerry Kammer	Copley News Service	"for their disclosure of bribe-taking that sent former Rep. Randy Cunningham to prison in disgrace.""
2006	Marcus Stern	Copley News Service	"for their disclosure of bribe-taking that sent former Rep. Randy Cunningham to prison in disgrace.""
2006	Staff	Copley News Service	"for their disclosure of bribe-taking that sent former Rep. Randy Cunningham to prison in disgrace.""
2006	Staff	The San Diego Union-Tribune	"for their disclosure of bribe-taking that sent former Rep. Randy Cunningham to prison in disgrace.""
2006	Michael Moss	The New York Times	"for his tenacious, thoroughly researched stories on the bureaucratic inertia that led to the fatal injury of American soldiers in Iraq who lacked protective armor."
2007	Charlie Savage	The Boston Globe	"for his revelations that President George W. Bush often used "signing statements" to assert his controversial right to bypass provisions of new laws."
2007	Bryan Denson	The Oregonian	"for their disclosure of mismanagement and other abuses in federally-subsidized programs for disabled workers, stirring congressional action."
2007	Jeff Kosseff	The Oregonian	"for their disclosure of mismanagement and other abuses in federally-subsidized programs for disabled workers, stirring congressional action."
2007	Les Zaitz	The Oregonian	"for their disclosure of mismanagement and other abuses in federally-subsidized programs for disabled workers, stirring congressional action."
2007	Steve Mills	Chicago Tribune	"for their investigation of a 1989 execution in Texas that strongly suggests an innocent man was killed by lethal injection."
2007	Maurice Possley	Chicago Tribune	"for their investigation of a 1989 execution in Texas that strongly suggests an innocent man was killed by lethal injection."
2008	Jo Becker	The Washington Post	"for their lucid exploration of Vice President Dick Cheney and his powerful yet sometimes disguised influence on national policy."
2008	Barton Gellman	The Washington Post	"for their lucid exploration of Vice President Dick Cheney and his powerful yet sometimes disguised influence on national policy."
2008	Howard Witt	Chicago Tribune	"for his wide ranging examination of complicated racial issues in America, from the courtroom to the schoolyard."
2008	Staff	The New York Times	"for its stories about CIA interrogation techniques that critics condemned as torture, stirring debate on the legal and moral limits of American action against terrorism."
2009	Staff	St. Petersburg Times	"for 'PolitiFact,' its fact-checking initiative during the 2008 presidential campaign that used probing reporters and the power of the World Wide Web to examine more than 750 political claims, separating rhetoric from truth to enlighten voters."
2009	Tom Avril	The Philadelphia Inquirer	"for their exhaustive reports on how political interests have eroded the mission of the Environmental Protection Agency and placed the nation's environment in greater jeopardy, setting the stage for remedial action."
2009	John Shiffman	The Philadelphia Inquirer	"for their exhaustive reports on how political interests have eroded the mission of the Environmental Protection Agency and placed the nation's environment in greater jeopardy, setting the stage for remedial action."
2009	John Sullivan	The Philadelphia Inquirer	"for their exhaustive reports on how political interests have eroded the mission of the Environmental Protection Agency and placed the nation's environment in greater jeopardy, setting the stage for remedial action."
2009	Amy Goldstein	The Washington Post	"for their relentless exploration of America's network of immigration detention centers, melding reporting and computer analysis to expose sometimes deadly abuses and spur corrective steps."
2009	Dana Priest	The Washington Post	"for their relentless exploration of America's network of immigration detention centers, melding reporting and computer analysis to expose sometimes deadly abuses and spur corrective steps."
2009	Staff	The Wall Street Journal	"for its highly detailed coverage of the collapse of America's financial system, explicating key decisions, capturing the sense of calamity and charting the human toll."
2010	Matt Richtel	The New York Times	"for incisive work, in print and online, on the hazardous use of cell phones, computers and other devices while operating cars and trucks, stimulating widespread efforts to curb distracted driving."
2010	Staff	The New York Times	"for incisive work, in print and online, on the hazardous use of cell phones, computers and other devices while operating cars and trucks, stimulating widespread efforts to curb distracted driving."
2010	Chris Adams	McClatchy	"for their examination of the nation's financial collapse and notably on the involvement of Goldman Sachs."
2010	Greg Gordon	McClatchy	"for their examination of the nation's financial collapse and notably on the involvement of Goldman Sachs."
2010	Kevin Hall	McClatchy	"for their examination of the nation's financial collapse and notably on the involvement of Goldman Sachs."
2010	Ken Bensinger	Los Angeles Times	"for their tenacious reporting on how design flaws and weak federal oversight contributed to a potentially lethal problem with Toyota vehicles, resulting in corrective steps and a congressional inquiry."
2010	Ralph Vartabedian	Los Angeles Times	"for their tenacious reporting on how design flaws and weak federal oversight contributed to a potentially lethal problem with Toyota vehicles, resulting in corrective steps and a congressional inquiry."
2011	Jake Bernstein	ProPublica	"for their exposure of questionable practices on Wall Street that contributed to the nation's economic meltdown, using digital tools to help explain the complex subject to lay readers."
2011	Jesse Eisinger	ProPublica	"for their exposure of questionable practices on Wall Street that contributed to the nation's economic meltdown, using digital tools to help explain the complex subject to lay readers."
2011	David Evans	Bloomberg News	"for his revelations of how life insurance companies retained death benefits owed to families of military veterans and other Americans, leading to government investigations and remedial changes."
2011	Staff	The Wall Street Journal	"for its examination of the disastrous explosion on the Deepwater Horizon oil rig in the Gulf of Mexico, using detailed reports to hold government and major corporations accountable."
2012	David Wood	The Huffington Post	"for his riveting exploration of the physical and emotional challenges facing American soldiers severely wounded in Iraq and Afghanistan during a decade of war."
2012	Jeff Donn	Associated Press	"for his diligent exposure of federal regulators easing or neglecting to enforce safety standards as aging nuclear power plants exceed their original life spans, with interactive data and videos used to drive home the findings."
2012	Jessica Silver-Greenberg	The Wall Street Journal	"for her compelling examination of aggressive debt collectors whose often questionable tactics, profitable but largely unseen by the public, vexed borrowers hard hit by the nation's financial crisis."
2013	David Hasemyer	Inside Climate News	"for their rigorous reports on flawed regulation of the nation's oil pipelines, focusing on potential ecological dangers posed by diluted bitumen (or "dilbit"), a controversial form of oil."
2013	Elizabeth McGowan	Inside Climate News	"for their rigorous reports on flawed regulation of the nation's oil pipelines, focusing on potential ecological dangers posed by diluted bitumen (or "dilbit"), a controversial form of oil."
2013	Lisa Song	Inside Climate News	"for their rigorous reports on flawed regulation of the nation's oil pipelines, focusing on potential ecological dangers posed by diluted bitumen (or "dilbit"), a controversial form of oil."
2013	Karen DeYoung	The Washington Post	"for their fresh exploration of how American drones moved from a temporary means to kill terrorists to a permanent weapon of war, raising issues of legality and accountability."
2013	Greg Miller	The Washington Post	"for their fresh exploration of how American drones moved from a temporary means to kill terrorists to a permanent weapon of war, raising issues of legality and accountability."
2013	Julie Tate	The Washington Post	"for their fresh exploration of how American drones moved from a temporary means to kill terrorists to a permanent weapon of war, raising issues of legality and accountability."
2013	Craig Whitlock	The Washington Post	"for their fresh exploration of how American drones moved from a temporary means to kill terrorists to a permanent weapon of war, raising issues of legality and accountability."
2013	Carolyn Johnson	The Boston Globe	"for their aggressive coverage of the deadly national outbreak of fungal meningitis traced to a compounding pharmacy in suburban Boston, revealing how the medical regulatory system failed to safeguard patients."
2013	Liz Kowalczyk	The Boston Globe	"for their aggressive coverage of the deadly national outbreak of fungal meningitis traced to a compounding pharmacy in suburban Boston, revealing how the medical regulatory system failed to safeguard patients."
2013	Kay Lazar	The Boston Globe	"for their aggressive coverage of the deadly national outbreak of fungal meningitis traced to a compounding pharmacy in suburban Boston, revealing how the medical regulatory system failed to safeguard patients."
2013	Todd Wallack	The Boston Globe	"for their aggressive coverage of the deadly national outbreak of fungal meningitis traced to a compounding pharmacy in suburban Boston, revealing how the medical regulatory system failed to safeguard patients."
2013	Patricia Wen	The Boston Globe	"for their aggressive coverage of the deadly national outbreak of fungal meningitis traced to a compounding pharmacy in suburban Boston, revealing how the medical regulatory system failed to safeguard patients."
2014	Dave Philipps	The Gazette	"for expanding the examination of how wounded combat veterans are mistreated, focusing on loss of benefits for life after discharge by the Army for minor offenses, stories augmented with digital tools and stirring congressional action."
2014	John Emshwiller	The Wall Street Journal	"for their reports and searchable database on the nation's often overlooked factories and research centers that once produced nuclear weapons and now pose contamination risks."
2014	Jeremy Singer-Vine	The Wall Street Journal	"for their reports and searchable database on the nation's often overlooked factories and research centers that once produced nuclear weapons and now pose contamination risks."
2014	Jon Hilsenrath	The Wall Street Journal	"for his exploration of the Federal Reserve, a powerful but little understood national institution."
2015	Carol D. Leonnig	The Washington Post	"for her smart, persistent coverage of the Secret Service, its security lapses and the ways in which the agency neglected its vital task: the protection of the President of the United States."
2015	Walt Bogdanich	The New York Times	"for stories exposing preferential police treatment for Florida State University football players who are accused of sexual assault and other criminal offenses."
2015	Mike McIntire	The New York Times	"for stories exposing preferential police treatment for Florida State University football players who are accused of sexual assault and other criminal offenses."
2015	Jonathan Landay	McClatchy	"for timely coverage of the Senate Intelligence Committee's report on CIA torture, demonstrating initiative and perseverance in overcoming government efforts to hide the details."
2015	Marisa Taylor	McClatchy	"for timely coverage of the Senate Intelligence Committee's report on CIA torture, demonstrating initiative and perseverance in overcoming government efforts to hide the details."
2015	Ali Watkins	McClatchy	"for timely coverage of the Senate Intelligence Committee's report on CIA torture, demonstrating initiative and perseverance in overcoming government efforts to hide the details."
2016	Staff	The Washington Post	"for its revelatory initiative in creating and using a national database to illustrate how often and why the police shoot to kill and who the victims are most likely to be."
2016	Jason Cherkis	The Huffington Post	"for deeply researched multimedia reporting on opioid addiction that punctured conventional wisdom by showing how many drug overdose deaths may have been preventable, not inevitable."
2016	Jeff Larson	ProPublica	"for ambitious reporting that uncovered greed, political cowardice and willful ignorance as prominent causes of the water crisis currently affecting the American West."
2016	Abrahm Lustgarten	ProPublica	"for ambitious reporting that uncovered greed, political cowardice and willful ignorance as prominent causes of the water crisis currently affecting the American West."
2016	Naveena Sadasivam	ProPublica	"for ambitious reporting that uncovered greed, political cowardice and willful ignorance as prominent causes of the water crisis currently affecting the American West."
2016	Al Shaw	ProPublica	"for ambitious reporting that uncovered greed, political cowardice and willful ignorance as prominent causes of the water crisis currently affecting the American West."
2016	David Sleight	ProPublica	"for ambitious reporting that uncovered greed, political cowardice and willful ignorance as prominent causes of the water crisis currently affecting the American West."
2017	David Fahrenthold	The Washington Post	"for persistent reporting that created a model for transparent journalism in political campaign coverage while casting doubt on Donald Trump's assertions of generosity toward charities."
2017	Renee Dudley	Reuters	"for uncovering a U.S. college admissions process corrupted by systematic cheating on standardized tests in Asia and the complicity of American officials eager to cash in on full-tuition foreign students."
2017	Alexandra Harney	Reuters	"for uncovering a U.S. college admissions process corrupted by systematic cheating on standardized tests in Asia and the complicity of American officials eager to cash in on full-tuition foreign students."
2017	Irene Jay Liu	Reuters	"for uncovering a U.S. college admissions process corrupted by systematic cheating on standardized tests in Asia and the complicity of American officials eager to cash in on full-tuition foreign students."
2017	Steve Stecklow	Reuters	"for uncovering a U.S. college admissions process corrupted by systematic cheating on standardized tests in Asia and the complicity of American officials eager to cash in on full-tuition foreign students."
2017	Staff	Reuters	"for uncovering a U.S. college admissions process corrupted by systematic cheating on standardized tests in Asia and the complicity of American officials eager to cash in on full-tuition foreign students."
2017	Staff	The Atlanta Journal-Constitution	"for an extraordinary series revealing the prevalence of sexual misconduct by doctors in Georgia and across the nation, many of whom continued to practice after their offenses were discovered."
2018	Staff	The New York Times	"for deeply sourced, relentlessly reported coverage in the public interest that dramatically furthered the nation's understanding of Russian interference in the 2016 presidential election and its connections to the Trump campaign, the President-elect's transition team and his eventual administration."
2018	Staff	The Washington Post	"for deeply sourced, relentlessly reported coverage in the public interest that dramatically furthered the nation's understanding of Russian interference in the 2016 presidential election and its connections to the Trump campaign, the President-elect's transition team and his eventual administration."
2018	Amy Julia Harris	The Center for Investigative Reporting	"for poignantly exposing a shocking practice that took root in Oklahoma, Arkansas and other states in which, under the guise of criminal justice reform, judges steered defendants into drug rehabs that were little more than lucrative work camps for private industry."
2018	Shoshana Walter	The Center for Investigative Reporting	"for poignantly exposing a shocking practice that took root in Oklahoma, Arkansas and other states in which, under the guise of criminal justice reform, judges steered defendants into drug rehabs that were little more than lucrative work camps for private industry."
2018	Brett Murphy	USA Today	"for a graceful, data-driven narrative populated by the truckers who transport goods from America's ports—spirited characters exploited by some of the country's largest and best-known companies."
2019	Staff	The Wall Street Journal	"for uncovering President Trump's secret payoffs to two women during his campaign who claimed to have had affairs with him, and the web of supporters who facilitated the transactions, triggering criminal inquiries and calls for impeachment."
2019	Carole Cadwalladr	The Guardian	"for reporting on how Facebook and other tech firms allowed the spread of misinformation and failed to protect consumer privacy, leading to Cambridge Analytica's theft of 50 million people's private information, data that was used to boost Donald Trump's campaign."
2019	Carole Cadwalladr	The Observer	"for reporting on how Facebook and other tech firms allowed the spread of misinformation and failed to protect consumer privacy, leading to Cambridge Analytica's theft of 50 million people's private information, data that was used to boost Donald Trump's campaign."
2019	Staff	The New York Times	"for reporting on how Facebook and other tech firms allowed the spread of misinformation and failed to protect consumer privacy, leading to Cambridge Analytica's theft of 50 million people's private information, data that was used to boost Donald Trump's campaign."
2019	Staff	Associated Press	"for authoritative coverage of the Trump administration's migrant family separation policy that exposed a federal government overwhelmed by the logistics of caring for and tracking thousands of immigrant children."
2020	Mike Baker	The Seattle Times	"for groundbreaking stories that exposed design flaws in the Boeing 737 MAX that led to two deadly crashes and revealed failures in government oversight."
2020	Dominic Gates	The Seattle Times	"for groundbreaking stories that exposed design flaws in the Boeing 737 MAX that led to two deadly crashes and revealed failures in government oversight."
2020	Lewis Kamb	The Seattle Times	"for groundbreaking stories that exposed design flaws in the Boeing 737 MAX that led to two deadly crashes and revealed failures in government oversight."
2020	Steve Miletich	The Seattle Times	"for groundbreaking stories that exposed design flaws in the Boeing 737 MAX that led to two deadly crashes and revealed failures in government oversight."
2020	Robert Faurtechi	ProPublica	"for their investigation into America's 7th Fleet after a series of deadly naval accidents in the Pacific."
2020	T. Christian Miller	ProPublica	"for their investigation into America's 7th Fleet after a series of deadly naval accidents in the Pacific."
2020	Megan Rose	ProPublica	"for their investigation into America's 7th Fleet after a series of deadly naval accidents in the Pacific."
2020	Staff	The Wall Street Journal	"for revelatory work showing how a California utility's neglect of its equipment caused countless wildfires, including one that wiped out the town of Paradise and killed 85 people."
2021	Staff	AL.com	"for a year-long investigation of K-9 units and the damage that police dogs inflict on Americans, including innocent citizens and police officers, prompting numerous statewide reforms."
2021	Staff	The Indianapolis Star	"for a year-long investigation of K-9 units and the damage that police dogs inflict on Americans, including innocent citizens and police officers, prompting numerous statewide reforms."
2021	Staff	Invisible Institute	"for a year-long investigation of K-9 units and the damage that police dogs inflict on Americans, including innocent citizens and police officers, prompting numerous statewide reforms."
2021	Staff	The Marshall Project	"for a year-long investigation of K-9 units and the damage that police dogs inflict on Americans, including innocent citizens and police officers, prompting numerous statewide reforms."
2021	Staff	The New York Times	"for detailed reporting on how the Trump administration consistently failed to respond properly or adequately to the coronavirus threat, including downplaying its seriousness."
2021	Staff	The Wall Street Journal	"for its series of stories documenting how nursing home residents were hit particularly hard by the coronavirus pandemic, partially because of improper decisions made by government officials."
2022	Staff	The New York Times	"for an ambitious project that quantified a disturbing pattern of fatal traffic stops by police, illustrating how hundreds of deaths could have been avoided and how officers typically avoided punishment."
2022	Eli Hager	The Marshall Project	"for powerful reporting that exposed how local government agencies throughout America quietly pocketed Social Security benefits intended for children in foster care."
2022	Joseph Shapiro	National Public Radio	"for powerful reporting that exposed how local government agencies throughout America quietly pocketed Social Security benefits intended for children in foster care."
2022	Staff	The Washington Post	"for a sweeping series on environmental racism, illuminating how American communities of color have disproportionately suffered for decades from dirty air, polluted water and lax or nonexistent environmental protection."
2023	Caroline Kitchener	The Washington Post	"for unflinching reporting that captured the complex consequences of life after Roe v. Wade, including the story of a Texas teenager who gave birth to twins after new restrictions denied her an abortion."
2023	Kristina Cooke	Reuters	"for a year-long investigation that exposed how two of the world's largest automakers and a major poultry supplier in Alabama violated child labor laws and exploited undocumented immigrant children."
2023	Mica Rosenberg	Reuters	"for a year-long investigation that exposed how two of the world's largest automakers and a major poultry supplier in Alabama violated child labor laws and exploited undocumented immigrant children."
2023	Joshua Schneyer	Reuters	"for a year-long investigation that exposed how two of the world's largest automakers and a major poultry supplier in Alabama violated child labor laws and exploited undocumented immigrant children."
2023	Stephania Taladrid	The New Yorker	"for sweeping and empathetic reporting on individuals caught in the abortion fight in New Mexico, Texas and Mexico, including stories about an abortion underground, women and girls trying to get health care, and the final days of a Houston abortion clinic."
2024	Staff	Reuters	"for an eye-opening series of accountability stories focused on Elon Musk's automobile and aerospace businesses, stories that displayed remarkable breadth and depth and provoked official probes of his companies' practices in Europe and the United States."
2024	Staff	The Washington Post	"for its sobering examination of the AR-15 semi-automatic rifle, which forced readers to reckon with the horrors wrought by the weapon often used for mass shootings in America." (Note: Moved by the Pulitzer board from the Public Service category.)
2024	Sharon Lurye	Associated Press	"for a deeply reported series on the corrosive effect of the pandemic on public education, highlighting the staggering number of students missing from classrooms across America."
2024	Bianca Vázquez Toness	Associated Press	"for a deeply reported series on the corrosive effect of the pandemic on public education, highlighting the staggering number of students missing from classrooms across America."
2024	Dave Philipps	The New York Times	"for groundbreaking reporting that uncovered a pattern of traumatic brain injuries among U.S. troops from blast exposures caused by the weapons they were firing."
2025	Staff	The Wall Street Journal	"for chronicling political and personal shifts of the richest person in the world, Elon Musk, including his turn to conservative politics, his use of legal and illegal drugs and his private conversations with Russian President Vladimir Putin."
2025	Jennifer Gollan	San Francisco Chronicle	"for an immersive and revelatory series that exposed the soaring death toll tied to police pursuits and detailed the near-total immunity that shields officers who initiate deadly chases."
2025	Susie Neilson	San Francisco Chronicle	"for an immersive and revelatory series that exposed the soaring death toll tied to police pursuits and detailed the near-total immunity that shields officers who initiate deadly chases."
2025	Staff	The Washington Post	"for a sweeping examination of the human and environmental toll of Hurricane Helene in Western North Carolina, including stories about the arrival of conspiracy theorists in one town and the efforts of residents of another to rebuild three months later."
2026	Peter Eisler	Reuters	"for documenting how the president used the U.S. government and the influence of his supporters to expand executive power and exact vengeance on his foes."
2026	Ned Parker	Reuters	"for documenting how the president used the U.S. government and the influence of his supporters to expand executive power and exact vengeance on his foes."
2026	Linda So	Reuters	"for documenting how the president used the U.S. government and the influence of his supporters to expand executive power and exact vengeance on his foes."
2026	Mike Spector	Reuters	"for documenting how the president used the U.S. government and the influence of his supporters to expand executive power and exact vengeance on his foes."
2026	Staff	Reuters	"for documenting how the president used the U.S. government and the influence of his supporters to expand executive power and exact vengeance on his foes."
2026	Staff	Bloomberg News	"for coverage of the Trump administration's deregulation of cryptocurrencies, which revealed conflicts of interest within a complex industry filled with unusual characters."
2026	Staff	The Washington Post	"for reporting that tracked the impact of the Trump administration's mass deportation campaign, following it from a Chicago park to the White House, a tent encampment in Texas and a Salvadoran prison."
