= Bryan Denson =

American journalist and author

Bryan Denson is an American author and investigative journalist who often writes about spies, terrorists, and other national security issues. His work won the 2006 George Polk Award and was a finalist for the Pulitzer Prize during his 20-year career at The Oregonian newspaper and oregonlive.com.

== Background ==
Denson studied film-video from 1976 to 1981 at the University of Maryland Baltimore County. He completed a leg of 100-man, 100-mile relay that set a Guinness Book of World Records for the Mass Relay (a record that held for more than 16 years). Six months later Denson placed 19th in the 1981 Maryland Marathon, later publishing a story about the race – "Honey, take my picture quick!: Racing with Bill Rodgers" – in Running Times magazine. He then pivoted to full-time freelance writing.

From 1982 to 2016, Denson worked as a reporter at five daily newspapers: the Palestine (Texas) Herald-Press, The Frederick (Maryland) News-Post, the York (Pennsylvania) Daily Record, The Houston Post, and The Oregonian. He worked a beat called The Fringe for several years at The Oregonian, reporting about people on the margins of society: anarchists, outlaw bikers, witches, eco-terrorists, cultists, caviar smugglers, nudists, neo-Nazis, UFO devotees, anti-racist skinheads, felonious swindling gypsies, animal-rights extremists, survivalists, purveyors of "murderabilia," and members of right-wing patriot and militia groups.

Denson's stories have appeared in Newsweek, Rolling Stone, The New York Times, Mother Jones, Reader’s Digest, Maxim, The Economist, Running Times, and the Nieman Reports. He also served on the board of directors for Underscore.news, a nonprofit newsroom that tells stories about marginalized communities, with a special focus on Indian Country.

== Books ==
- The Spy’s Son: The True Story of the Highest-Ranking CIA Officer Ever Convicted of Espionage and the Son He Trained to Spy for Russia (Atlantic Monthly Press, New York, 2015). a finalist for the William E. Colby Award and the Audible version of the book was read by voice actor Jason Culp, son of the 1960s TV spy Robert Culp.
- The Unabomber: Agent Kathy Puckett and the Hunt for a Serial Bomber (Macmillan, Roaring Brook Press, New York, 2019). This is the first installment of The FBI Files, Denson's nonfiction book series for middle grade readers. The Junior Library Guild named the book a Gold Standard Selection.
- Catching a Russian Spy: Agent Leslie G. Wiser, Jr., and the Case of Aldrich Ames (Macmillan, Roaring Brook Press, New York, 2020). The second book in the FBI Files series takes readers inside the thrilling investigation of CIA turncoat Aldrich Ames.
- Uncovering a Terrorist: Agent Ryan Dwyer and the Case of the Portland Bomb Plot (Macmillan, Roaring Brook Press, New York, 2020). The final book in the FBI Files series

== Select National Awards ==
- 2012: Second place, The Society for Features Journalism Excellence in Feature Writing, for "The Spy's Kid," a news series in The Oregonian about the Harold James Nicholson spy cases.
- 2008: Finalist for the Investigative Reporters & Editors Awards (with Brent Walth), for stories on the Social Security Administration's multi-year backlog of disability cases and the horrors it wrought on Americans with disabilities.
- 2007: Finalist, The Pulitzer Prize for National Reporting (with Jeff Kosseff and Les Zaitz) for stories that exposed scandal among nonprofit contractors in the U.S. government's biggest jobs program for Americans with disabilities, created by the Javits-Wagner-O'Day Act (JWOD).
- 2006: Winner of the George Polk Award for National Reporting for the series on the JWOD scandal.
- 2002: Winner of the Michael E. DeBakey Journalism Award for stories on failed, expensive, and duplicative efforts to clone rhesus macaque monkeys at a federal primate research center.
- 2000: Finalist for the John B. Oakes Award for Distinguished Environmental Journalism for a series on domestic terrorism attributed to the Earth Liberation Front.
- 1994: Meritorious achievement citation from the White House Correspondents' Association (Edgar A. Poe Award) for “The Price We Pay,” a news series that explored the enormous medical costs of violence through the story of a teenage stabbing victim.
- 1993: Finalist for the Robert F. Kennedy Journalism Awards and the Livingston Awards for Young Journalists for “The Slaying of a Generation,” a news series on an epidemic surge of gunfire deaths among Black teenagers in Houston, 47 of whom died in one year.

== Personal life ==
Denson lives in Portland, Oregon, with his wife Kristin Quinlan, chief executive officer of Certified Languages International.
