= Donald L. Barlett =

American journalist (1936–2024)

- Born: Donald Leon Barlett; July 17, 1936; DuBois, Pennsylvania, U.S.
- Died: October 5, 2024 (aged 88); Philadelphia, Pennsylvania, U.S.
- Education: Pennsylvania State University
- Occupations: Investigative journalist; Non-fiction writer
- Spouse: Nancy Barlett
- Website: http://barlettandsteele.com/

Donald Leon Barlett (July 17, 1936 – October 5, 2024) was an American investigative journalist and author writing for The Inquirer, Time Inc., and Vanity Fair Magazine. Barlett partnered with James B. Steele, with whom he won two Pulitzer Prizes, two National Magazine Awards, and six George Polk Awards. They were known for their reporting technique of delving deep into documents and then, after what could be a long investigative period, interviewing the necessary sources. The duo worked together for over 40 years and are frequently referred to as Barlett and Steele.

== Early life and education ==
Donald Leon Barlett was born on July 17, 1936 in DuBois, Pennsylvania, to James and Mary (née Wineberg) Barlett. He grew up in Johnstown, Pennsylvania, and attended Penn State University from 1954 to 1955.

== Career ==
After Penn State, Barlett served as a special agent with the U.S. Army Counter Intelligence Corps for three years until 1956, when he began his journalistic career as a reporter for the Reading (Pennsylvania) Times. Nine years later he became an investigative journalist for The Plain Dealer, and later took similar jobs with The Chicago Daily News and The Philadelphia Inquirer, where he met his collaborator James B. Steele. In 1997, Barlett and Steele became editors-at-large for Time. In 2006, they moved to Vanity Fair as contributing editors. Over the years, Barlett and Steele wrote about diverse topics including crime, economics, politics, and health care.

Barlett and Steele won two Pulitzers and were recognized for their contributions to American journalism for their work at The Philadelphia Inquirer. In 1973, during one of their earliest collaborations for The Inquirer, Barlett and Steele pioneered the use of computers for the analysis of data on violent crimes. The project was a seven-part series, titled "Crime and Injustice", and was blocked for a Pulitzer, according to Steele, because a Pulitzer juror had rejected data-driven reporting, stating: "Any story that uses a computer is going to win a Pulitzer over my dead body." Barlett and Steele won their first Pulitzer Prize for National Reporting and the Gerald Loeb Special Award in 1975 for a series called "Auditing the Internal Revenue Service" published by The Inquirer. They won their second Pulitzer Prize for National Reporting and the Gerald Loeb Award for Large Newspapers in 1989 at the Inquirer for their coverage of temporary tax breaks embedded in the Tax Reform Act of 1986. Their 1991 Inquirer series America: What Went Wrong? was named by the New York University department of journalism as 51st on its list of the 100 best pieces of journalism of the 20th century. Rewritten as a book it became a No. 1 New York Times bestseller. It is one of seven books Barlett and Steele have published, five of which were written while at The Inquirer.

After 26 years as a team for The Inquirer, Barlett and Steele left to pursue investigative reporting at Time. It was while they were at Time that the investigative reporting team won their two National Magazine Awards, as well at their record breaking 6th George Polk Award, although this time for excellence in magazine journalism.

After leaving Time over monetary issues, Barlett and Steele were hired by Vanity Fair to be contributing editors under the agreement that they would contribute two articles in their signature long-form style each year. In 2007, Barlett and Steele, while still working for Vanity Fair, were featured in the PBS documentary series Exposé: America's Investigative Reports in an episode entitled "Friends In High Places," which was about government contracts. When asked on the program how they managed to work for so many years together, Barlett said, "We're both very boring. Who else reads the tax codes?"

== Death ==
Barlett died at his home in Chestnut Hill, Philadelphia on October 5, 2024. He was 88 years old.

== Impact ==
Barlett and Steele are used as examples in investigative reporting textbooks as a model of technique and excellence in journalism. As career investigative journalists, Barlett and Steele have become well known for their teamwork, "documents state of mind," consistent accuracy, "replicability" for revealing their sources, and ability to make their work relevant to ordinary people, such as in "America: What Went Wrong?". Their employers, especially Gene Roberts at The Inquirer, provided them with the opportunity to spend a long period of time reviewing documents in pursuit of journalism with depth and gave them the space to publish their work in lengthy articles in newspapers and magazines.

About Barlett and Steele, fellow investigative reporter Bob Woodward said, "They're an institution. They have kind of perfected a method of doing their work, and I have the highest regard for it. Systematic, comprehensive − they take a long time, and they don't mind saying what their conclusions are."

Both Pulitzer Prize Awards illustrate the auditing function of investigative journalism, whereby the press as "The Fourth Estate" watches over government. In 1975, they audited the Internal Revenue Service. In 1989, they acted as watchdogs over the House Ways and Means Committee Chair Dan Rostenkowski and the insertion by Democrats and Republicans of temporary tax breaks in the Tax Reform Act of 1986.

Bartlett and Steele's work has received multiple awards, including two Pulitzer Prizes and two National Magazine Awards. In acknowledgment of their influence, the Donald W. Reynolds National Center for Business Journalism established the Barlett and Steele Awards in 2007, which honor excellence in print and online investigative business journalism.

== Published works ==
=== Books ===
- Barlett, Donald L.; Steele, James B. (1979). Empire: The Life, Legend, and Madness of Howard Hughes. W.W. Norton & Company. ISBN 0-393-00025-7.
- Barlett, Donald L.; Steele, James B. (1985). Forevermore: Nuclear Waste in America. W.W. Norton & Company. ISBN 0-393-01920-9.
- Barlett, Donald L.; Steele, James B. (1992). America: What Went Wrong?. Andrews and McMeel. ISBN 0-8362-7001-0.
- Barlett, Donald L.; Steele, James B. (1994). America: Who Really Pays the Taxes?. Simon & Schuster. ISBN 0-671-87157-9.
- Barlett, Donald L.; Steele, James B. (1996). America: Who Stole the Dream?. Andrews and McMeel. ISBN 0-8362-1314-9.
- Barlett, Donald L.; Steele, James B. (2000). The Great American Tax Dodge: How Spiraling Fraud and Avoidance are Killing Fairness, Destroying the Income Tax, And Costing You. Little, Brown and Company. ISBN 0-316-81135-1.
- Barlett, Donald L.; Steele, James B. (2004). Critical Condition: How Health Care in America Became Big Business — and Bad Medicine. Doubleday. ISBN 0-385-50454-3.
- Barlett, Donald L.; Steele, James B. (2012). The Betrayal of the American Dream. PublicAffairs. ISBN 978-1-586-48969-4.
