= 1954 Pulitzer Prize =

Awards for journalism and related fields

The following are the Pulitzer Prizes for 1954.

== Journalism awards ==
- Public Service:
  - Newsday (Garden City, New York), for its expose of New York State's race track scandals and labor racketeering, which led to the extortion indictment, guilty plea and imprisonment of William C. DeKoning, Sr., New York labor racketeer.
- Local Reporting, Edition Time:
  - Vicksburg Sunday Post-Herald, for its outstanding coverage of the tornado of December 5, 1953, under extraordinary difficulties.
- Local Reporting, No Edition Time:
  - Alvin Scott McCoy of The Kansas City Star, for a series of exclusive stories which led to the resignation under fire of C. Wesley Roberts as Republican National Chairman.
- National Reporting:
  - Richard L. Wilson of the Des Moines Register & Tribune, for his exclusive publication of the FBI Report to the White House in the Harry Dexter White case before it was laid before the Senate by J. Edgar Hoover.
- International Reporting:
  - Jim G. Lucas of Scripps-Howard Newspapers, for his notable front-line human interest reporting of the Korean War, the armistice and the prisoner-of-war exchanges, climaxing 26 months of distinguished service as a war correspondent.
- Editorial Writing:
  - Don Murray of the Boston Herald, for a series of editorials on the New Look in National Defense which won wide attention for their analysis of changes in American military policy.
- Editorial Cartooning:
  - Herbert L. Block (Herblock) of The Washington Post & Washington Times-Herald, for a cartoon depicting the robed figure of Death saying to Stalin after he died, You Were Always A Great Friend of Mine, Joseph.

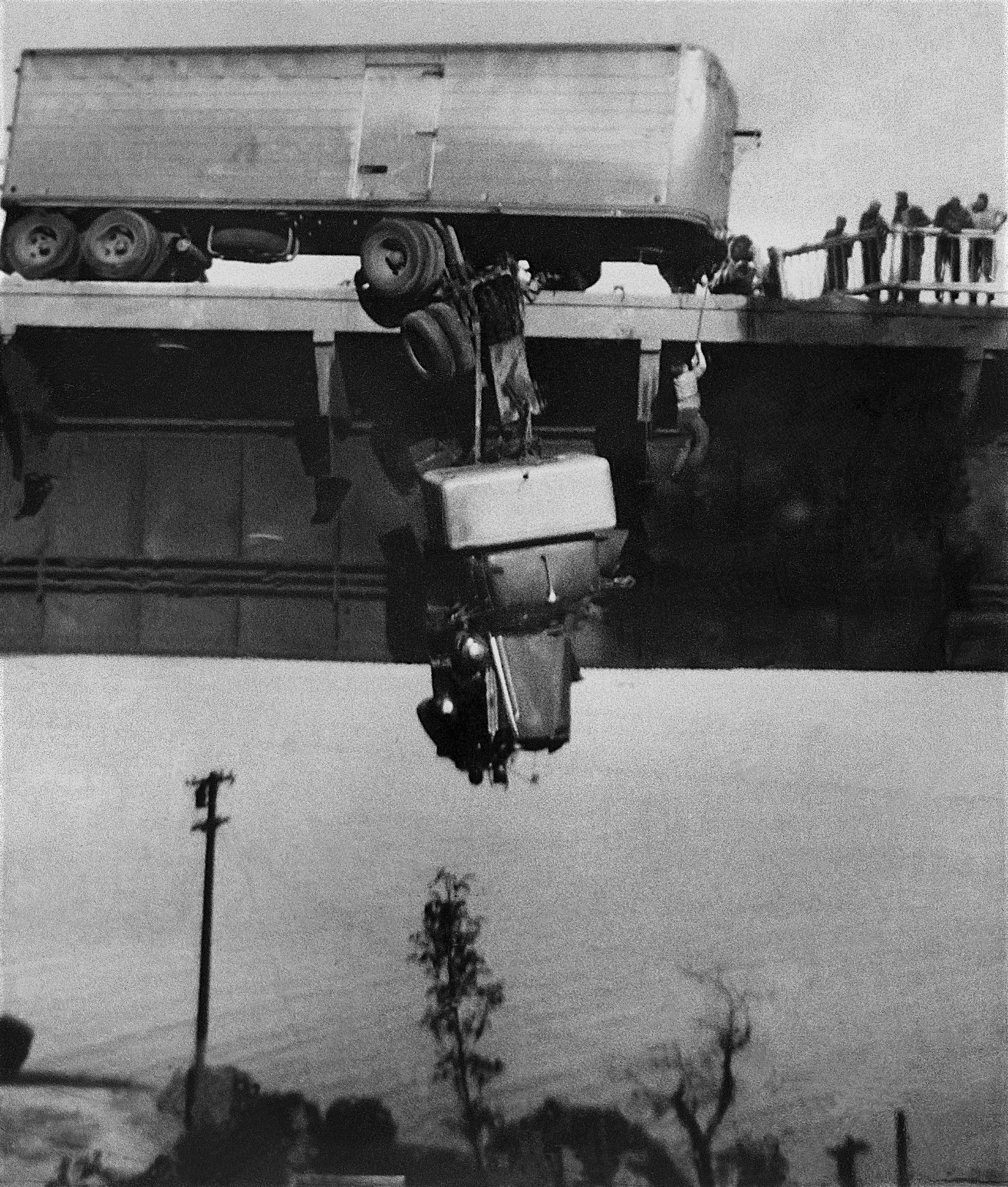
"Rescue on Pit River Bridge", the winning photograph

- Photography:
  - Virginia Schau, an amateur from San Anselmo, California, for snapping a thrilling rescue at Redding, California, the picture being published in the Akron Beacon Journal and other newspapers and nationally distributed by the AP.

== Letters, Drama and Music Awards ==
- Fiction:
  - No award given.
- Drama:
  - The Teahouse of the August Moon by John Patrick (Putnam).
- History:
  - A Stillness at Appomattox by Bruce Catton (Doubleday).
- Biography or Autobiography:
  - The Spirit of St. Louis by Charles Lindbergh (Scribner).
- Poetry:
  - The Waking by Theodore Roethke (Doubleday).
- Music:
  - Concerto For Two Pianos and Orchestra by Quincy Porter (American Composers Alliance). First performed by the Louisville Symphony Orchestra, March 17, 1954. This was one of the works commissioned under a grant of the Rockefeller Foundation for new American compositions for orchestra, or soloists and orchestra.
