= Gaylord Shaw =

American journalist

Gaylord Dewayne Shaw
- Born: July 22, 1942; El Reno, Oklahoma
- Died: September 6, 2015 (aged 73); Duncan, Oklahoma
- Occupation: Journalist
- Known for: Winning a Pulitzer Prize for National Reporting in 1978 and breaking the news of President Richard Nixon's resignation

Gaylord Dewayne Shaw (July 22, 1942 – September 6, 2015) was an American journalist who won a Pulitzer Prize for National Reporting in 1978.

== Early life and education ==
Shaw was born on July 22, 1942, in El Reno, Oklahoma. He attended Cameron College from 1960 to 1962 and the University of Oklahoma from 1962 to 1964.

== Journalism career ==
While in college, Shaw began his journalism career as a police reporter for the Constitution-Press in Lawton. In 1962, at the age of twenty, he joined the Associated Press's Oklahoma City bureau. In 1966, he joined the Associated Press's Washington, D.C. office to work as a deskman, and from 1967 to 1971 he was a member of an Associated Press special assignment team focused mainly on investigative reporting. In March 1975, he began working for the Los Angeles Times in their Washington bureau. In 1978, he won a Pulitzer Prize for National Reporting for a series of articles he wrote for the Los Angeles Times about unsafe dams across the United States. He has also been credited with breaking the news that President Richard Nixon was going to resign. He earned the 1980 Gerald Loeb Award for Large Newspapers for coverage of the U.S. energy crisis. In 1988, he joined Newsday as their Washington bureau chief, where he oversaw a Pulitzer Prize-winning story about the Persian Gulf War in 1991. In 1997, he was part of a large team of reporters that won another Pulitzer Prize for a story about the crash of TWA Flight 800, for spot news reporting. He retired in 2002.

== Death ==
Shaw died on September 6, 2015, in Duncan, Oklahoma; his family members suspect he died from a heart attack.
