= David Philipps =

American journalist

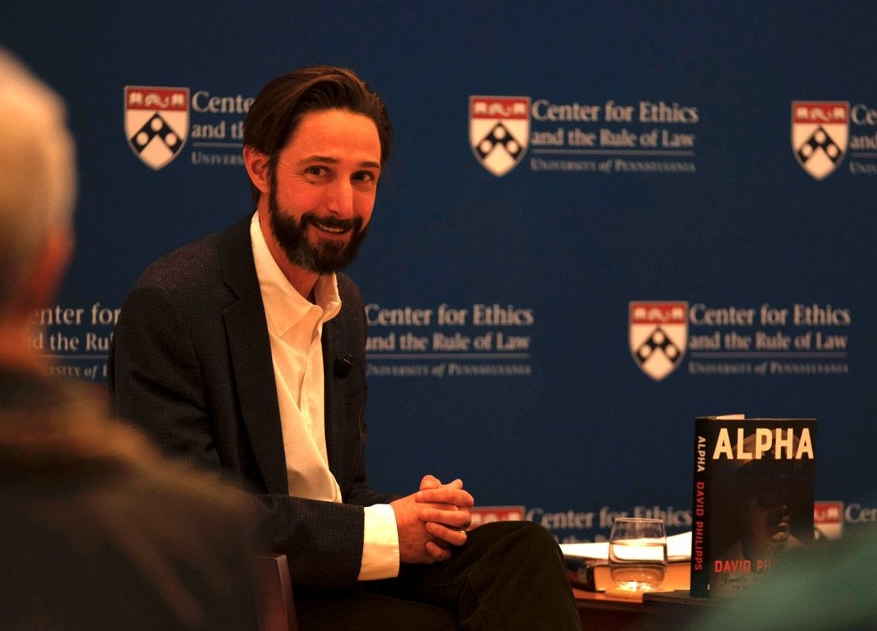
- Born: David Nathaniel Philipps; 1977 (age 48–49)
- Education: Middlebury College, Columbia University Graduate School of Journalism
- Occupations: Journalist, author
- Employer: The New York Times
- Writing career
- Notable works: ALPHA: Eddie Gallagher and the war for the soul of the Navy SEALs, Lethal Warriors, Wild Horse Country
- Notable awards: Pulitzer Prize (twice)

David Nathaniel Philipps (born 1977) is an American journalist, a national correspondent for The New York Times and author of three non-fiction books. His work has largely focused on the human impact of the wars in Iraq and Afghanistan, and the people who make up the United States military. He has been awarded The Pulitzer Prize twice, most recently in 2022.

== Education ==
Philipps graduated from Middlebury College in 2000 and earned a master's degree from the Columbia University Graduate School of Journalism in 2002.

== Career ==
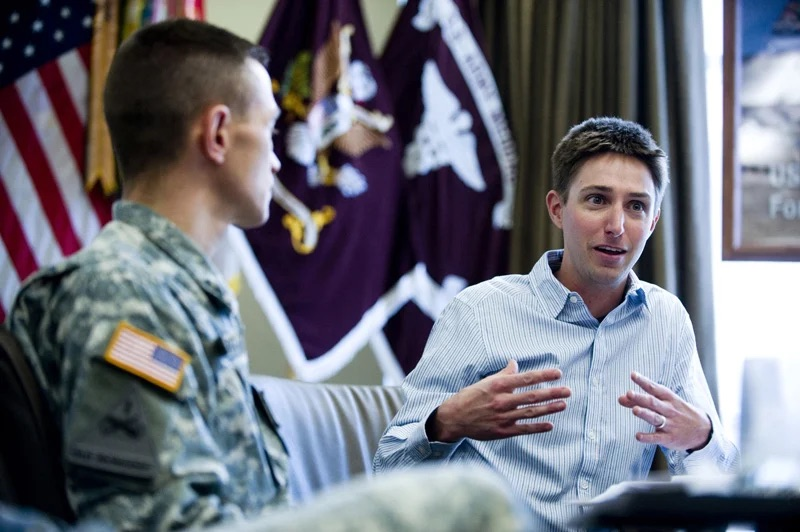

Philipps has been a military correspondent for The New York Times since 2014. Previous to that he worked for 11 years as a features writer and enterprise reporter at the Colorado Springs Gazette.

Philipps's reporting in 2023 and 2025 focused on how firing heavy weapons, operating high-power vehicles, and other routine training that the military for generations thought was safe was causing serious brain injuries. Those injuries were often mistaken for PTSD. Philipps documented a broad pattern of debilitating brain injuries in artillery and mortar crews, career Navy SEALs, Navy fighter pilots and Coast Guard surfmen, prompting a series of corrective actions by Congress and The Pentagon.

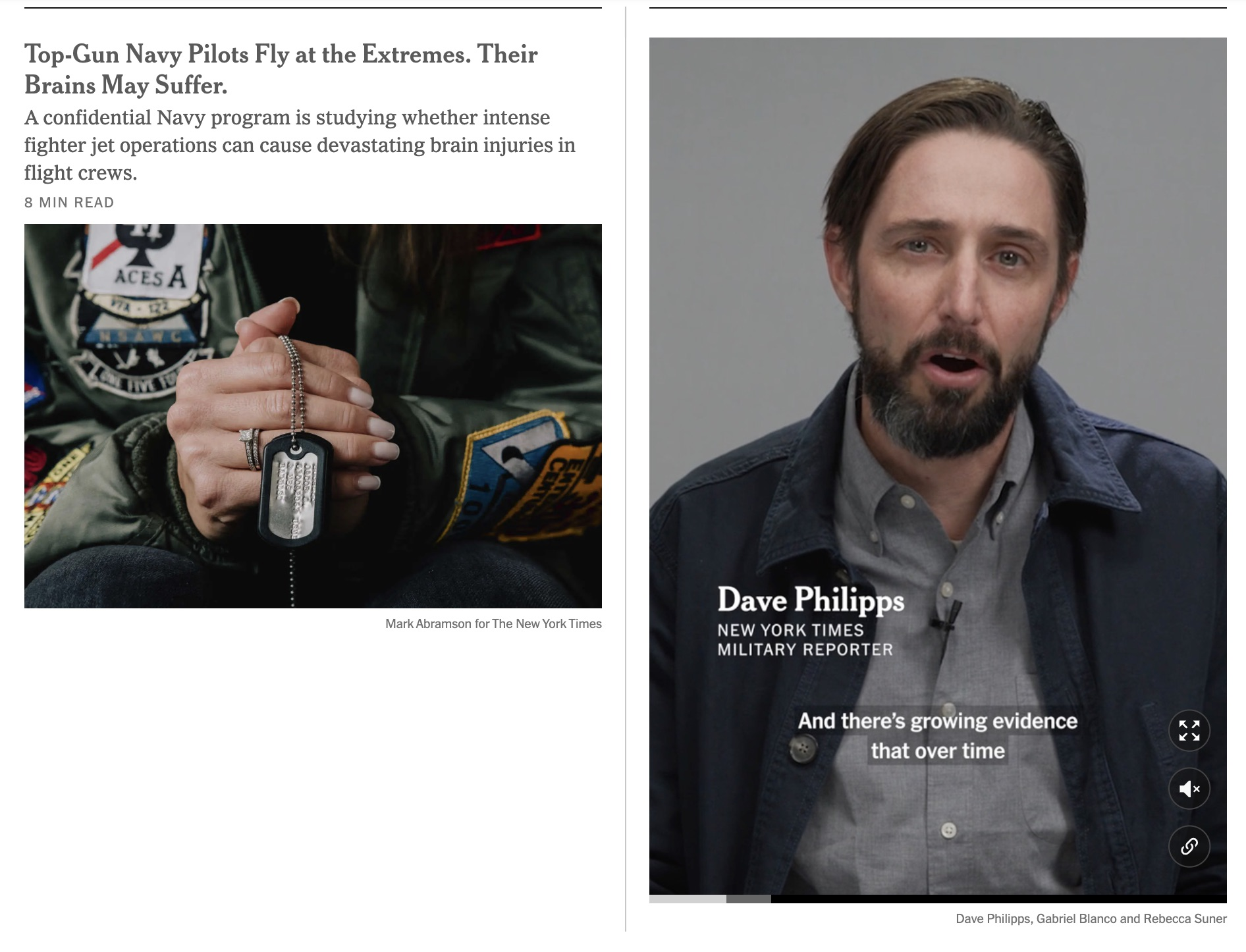

In 2022 Philipps was part of a small team of reporters that exposed how United States military airstrikes in Syria, Iraq and Afghanistan caused thousands of civilian deaths that had never been publicly reported. The work was awarded The Pulitzer Prize for international reporting.

The author's 2021 book, ALPHA, examines the high-profile court martial of Navy SEAL chief Edward Gallagher and the history and culture of the elite SEAL commando teams that lead to what the men who served under him testified were a number of cold-blooded murders.

In 2014, Philipps published for a three-day series "Other Than Honorable" in The Gazette of Colorado Springs on the treatment of injured American soldiers being discharged without military benefits. The series was awarded the Pulitzer Prize for National Reporting.

Philipps has been named a finalist for the Pulitzer Prize four times, in 2009 for an investigation of violent crime in Colorado Springs by returning combat soldiers, in 2018 for breaking news coverage of a mass shooting in Las Vegas, and in 2024 and 2025 for an investigation showing soldiers were getting brain injuries from firing their own weapons. Philipps also won the 2009 Livingston Award for his reporting on violence in infantry troops returning from Iraq. His book, Lethal Warriors chronicles how the 12th Infantry Regiment, stationed at Fort Carson, Colorado, produced a high number of murders after soldiers returned from unusually violent combat tours.

Philipps has written extensively about wild horses in the West. His work gained attention in 2012 when U.S. Secretary of Interior Ken Salazar threatened to punch him for asking about problems in the department's wild horse program. The incident was later parodied by the satirical news publication The Onion. Philipps's subsequent reporting led to state and federal investigation of the wild horse program and its largest horse buyer. His 2017 book, Wild Horse Country, traces the culture and history that created modern wild horse management.

== Notable works ==
- ALPHA: Eddie Gallagher and the war for the soul of the Navy SEALs
- "How a Top Secret Navy SEAL Mission into North Korea Fell Apart "
- "Top Gun Pilots Fly at the Extremes. Their Brains May Suffer "
- "Pattern of Brain Injury is Pervasive in Navy SEALs who Died by Suicide "
- "A Secret War, Strange New Wounds, and Silence From the Pentagon " The New York Times, Nov. 5, 2023
- "Death in Navy SEALs Reveals a Culture of Brutality, Cheating and Drugs " The New York Times, Aug. 30, 2022
- "How the U.S. Hid Airstrikes that Killed Dozens of Civilians " The New York Times, Nov. 13, 2021
- "Civilian Deaths Mounted as Secret Unit Pounded ISIS " The New York Times, December 12, 2021
- "The Unseen Scars of those who Kill by Remote Control " The New York Times, April 15, 2022
- Wild Horse Country, the history, myth and future of the mustang, America's horse
- "Wild Horses Adopted under a Federal Program are going to Slaughter" The New York Times, July 20, 2021
- "Navy SEALs were warned against reporting their chief " The New York Times, April 23, 2019
- "Wounded Warrior Project Spends Lavishly on Itself " The New York Times, January 27, 2016]
- "In unit stalked by suicide, members try to save one another" ," The New York Times, Sept. 19, 2015
- "Other than Honorable," The Colorado Springs Gazette, May 19, 2013
- "Casualties of War," The Colorado Springs Gazette, July 28, 2009.
- "All the missing horses," ProPublica, Sept. 28, 2012
- "Honor and Deception," The Colorado Springs Gazette, Dec. 1, 2013
