= William Dietrich (novelist) =

American novelist

- Born: William Alan Dietrich; Tacoma, Washington, U.S.
- Education: Western Washington University; Harvard University
- Occupations: Journalist, writer
- Writing career
- Genres: Historical fiction, thrillers
- Subject: Pacific Northwest natural history
- Notable awards: Pulitzer Prize for National Reporting (1990); Washington Governor Writer's Award; Pacific Northwest Booksellers Award
- Website: www.williamdietrich.com

William Alan Dietrich is an American novelist, non-fiction writer, journalist, and college professor. His historical novels and thrillers have made bestseller lists and his Ethan Gage series, set during the Napoleonic Wars, have sold in 28 languages. He has also written novels set in the Roman Empire, Antarctica, and Australia. His non-fiction works are natural history and environmental history of the Pacific Northwest.

Dietrich was born and raised in Tacoma, Washington, and attended Fairhaven College at Western Washington University, graduating with a degree in journalism. He worked for several Pacific Northwest newspapers and Gannett News Service. While at The Seattle Times, he covered the 1989 Exxon Valdez oil spill, and shared the Pulitzer Prize for National Reporting with three other Times journalists. He was a Nieman Fellow at Harvard University (1987–88) and won National Science Foundation fellowships to Antarctica in 1994 and 1996. He reported extensively on science and the environment. His first book, The Final Forest, depicted the old growth and spotted owl battle in Forks, Washington. The book won the Washington Governor Writer's Award and Pacific Northwest Booksellers Award. He wrote a book on the Columbia River, Northwest Passage, a book on Northwest plants and animals, Natural Grace, and did the text for a pictorial book by photographer Art Wolfe, On Puget Sound.

His first novel, the World War II adventure Ice Reich, grew out of his reporting in Antarctica. This was followed by Getting Back, an eco-fable set in Australia, Dark Winter, a thriller at the South Pole, and Hadrian's Wall and The Scourge of God, set during the Roman empire. Most recent are the Ethan Gage series of novels: Napoleon's Pyramids, The Rosetta Key, The Dakota Cipher, The Barbary Pirates, and The Emerald Storm.

Since 2006 he has been a professor of environmental journalism and writing at Huxley College of the Environment at Western Washington University, where he advises Planet magazine. He currently lives in Washington State with his wife Holly. He has two grown daughters.

== Books ==
=== Standalone novels ===
- Ice Reich (1998)
- Getting Back (2000)
- Dark Winter (2001)
- Hadrian's Wall (2004)
- The Scourge of God (2005)
- Blood of the Reich (2011)
- The Murder of Adam and Eve (2014)

=== Ethan Gage adventures ===
1. Napoleon's Pyramids (2007)
2. The Rosetta Key (2008)
3. The Dakota Cipher (2009)
4. The Barbary Pirates (2010)
5. The Emerald Storm (2012)
6. The Barbed Crown (2013)
7. The Three Emperors (2014)
8. The Trojan Icon (2016)

=== Non-fiction ===
- The Final Forest: The Battle for the Last Great Trees of the Pacific Northwest (Simon & Schuster, 1992)
  - The Final Forest: Big Trees, Forks, and the Pacific Northwest (University of Washington Press, 2010), with a new preface and afterword
- Northwest Passage: The Great Columbia River (Simon & Schuster, 1995)
- Natural Grace: The Charm, Wonder, and Lessons of Pacific Northwest Animals and Plants (University of Washington Press, 2003), drawings by Brenda Cunningham
- On Puget Sound (Sasquatch Books, 2007), by Art Wolfe with Philip Kramer, text by Dietrich—pictorial work
- Natural Skagit: A Journey from Mountains to Sea (Skagit Land Trust, 2008), collection with foreword by Tom Robbins, epilogue by Bill Dietrich
- Critical Messages: Contemporary Northwest Artists on the Environment, Sarah Clark-Langager and Dietrich (Western Washington University and others, 2010); ISBN 9781878237071—catalog of a 2010–2011 exhibition
