= Howard Van Smith =

American journalist

- Born: Howard Smith; April 6, 1909; Forest Hill, New Jersey
- Died: August 14, 1987 (aged 78); Jacksonville, Florida
- Occupation: Journalist
- Spouse: Anne McCarron (m. 1938; d. 1987)
- Writing career
- Notable awards: Pulitzer Prize for National Reporting; 1959

Howard Van Smith (April 6, 1909 – August 14, 1987), was an American journalist. A longtime staffer for The Miami News and several other newspapers, he won a Pulitzer Prize in 1959.

== Early life and education ==
Born in Forest Hill, New Jersey, he was the son of Arthur Smith and Florence (Garrettson) Lockwood. He was graduated from Pennington Preparatory School in Pennington, New Jersey, in 1929 and from college (perhaps Union College or Franklin & Marshall College) in 1937.

== Career ==
He worked as a copy boy at The New York Times. At around this time, he changed his name from Howard Smith to Howard Van Smith, reportedly in order to avoid being confused with another person named Howard Smith.

He was a staff reporter for the New York Times from 1930 to 1932, then worked as a freelance writer from 1933 to 1935. He was a heating and hydraulics engineer from 1935 to 1942. He worked as a civilian engineer for the U.S. Air Force at Warner-Robins Air Force Base in Georgia from 1942 to 1944.

He was a reporter for the Orlando Sentinel in 1944, then a Sunday editor for The Miami News from 1945 to 1957 and a "special writer" for that newspaper from 1957 to 1965. From 1948 to 1954, while at the Miami News, he was also a lecturer at the University of Miami. From the Miami News, he moved to the Fort Lauderdale News, for which he worked from 1965 to 1977.

He then left journalism, working as an administrative assistant at the Florida Department of Agriculture in Davie, Florida, from 1978 to 1980. He was editor of the Florida Nurseryman from 1981 to 1986.

=== Books and other writings ===
He co-wrote the 1963 book The New Speech-O-Gram Technique for Persuasive Public Speaking with C. Raymond Van Dusen.

He also wrote a 1973 book, The Education of Juan.

In addition, he was contributor of articles and short stories to various national magazines.

=== Other professional activities ===
Van Smith was an adviser for Edward R. Murrow's 1962 CBS Reports television documentary Harvest of Shame. "It was the only documentary to make television's Hall of Fame."

== Honors and awards ==
In 1959, while at the Miami News, Van Smith won the Pulitzer Prize for National Reporting for a series of articles that focused public notice on deplorable conditions in migrant labor camps in Homestead and Immokalee, Florida. A January freeze had destroyed most of the winter crops in the area, stranding the workers, about 4000 in all, in shantytowns "mired in filth." His reporting "brought in $100,000 in contributions and prompted official action" and "gave national attention to the problem of migratory laborers." In particular, his articles were said to have stirred the feelings of Florida Governor LeRoy Collins, who saw to it that conditions for the workers were improved. The series also "resulted in vastly improved conditions" for agricultural migrant laborers and "tightened state regulations" governing their working conditions.

He won an award of merit from the Florida Public Health Association in 1959 and the Service to Mankind award in 1961. He was named to the Horticultural Hall of Fame in 1976 and selected as foremost gardening writer by the American Association of Nurserymen in 1978. He was also a New York State Center for Migrant Studies fellow at the State University of New York at Geneseo.

He reportedly also won "several awards as a garden writer and columnist."

== Personal life ==
He married Anne McCarron on June 21, 1938. They had four children, Garrett, Parris, Antony, and William. He married Micheline Mathews on November 26, 1965. Micheline was formerly married to John F. Mathews, with whom she had a daughter, Van Smith's stepdaughter, Micheline Mary Mathews. The stepdaughter taught bacteriology at Harvard Medical School and married Dr. Robert Steele Roth in 1966.

== Death ==
He died in a four-vehicle auto accident in Jacksonville, Florida, which also injured his wife, Micheline. He was driving his 1986 Honda Accord when it struck two other cars on the Trout River Bridge, then hit the rear end of a flatbed truck that was approaching a toll plaza in a northbound lane of Interstate 95. Investigators speculated that Van Smith had blacked out at the wheel. He and his wife were taken by air ambulance to University Hospital, where he was pronounced dead.

== Tributes ==
After his death, an editor of the Sun-Sentinel, Barc Bowman, described Van Smith as a man who "really had a genuine sense of compassion for the poor people and the people who, not from their own fault, led tough lives....Anyone can write about those things, but Howard was someone who really felt for the people he wrote about." Vern Williams, an assistant editor at the Miami News, called the series of articles "a work of the heart," adding that "Howard was an editor with an extraordinary ability to encourage writers to look beneath the surface of the town`s troubles and triumphs....He was also a very compassionate writer himself." Van Smith's former city editor at the Miami News, John McMullan, said that Van Smith had been "devoted to accuracy and had a high social conscience."
