= Neill Borowski =

American journalist

Neill A. Borowski is an American journalist, and executive editor of Gannett's Central New York Media Group. He was executive editor of The Press of Atlantic City. from 2009 to 2013 when he joined the CNY Media Group. He won the 1994 Goldsmith Prize for Investigative Reporting, with Gilbert M. Gaul. He was a Pulitzer finalist. The Central NY Media Group includes three daily newspapers and websites: the Press & Sun-Bulletin in Binghamton, the Star-Gazette in Elmira and The Ithaca Journal.

== Life ==
He graduated from University of Bridgeport, and from Columbia University, with a Masters in journalism. He studied economics at Temple University, and taught journalism at Temple University. He was a Knight Bagehot Fellow in Economics and Business Journalism in 1979–80, at the Columbia Business School.

He served as a reporter, editor and assistant circulation director for The Philadelphia Inquirer from 1983 to 2004. He founded The Inquirer's computer-assisted reporting team in 1993. He was assistant managing editor, at The Indianapolis Star from 2004 to 2006. He was managing editor at the Democrat and Chronicle in Rochester, New York, from 2006 to 2009. He participated in Columbia Journalism School's Punch Sulzberger leadership program in 2011.
