= Caroline Kitchener =

American investigative journalist

Caroline Kitchener is an investigative reporter at the New York Times. While at The Washington Post, she won the 2023 Pulitzer Prize for National Reporting and a 2023 duPont-Columbia award for her coverage of the fall of Roe v. Wade.

Her nonfiction book, "Post Grad: Five Women and Their First Year Out of College," follows the lives of five women in their first year after their college graduation.

Kitchener graduated from Princeton University with a BA in History and a minor in Gender and Sexuality Studies.
