= Edward R. Cony =

American journalist

- Born: March 15, 1923; Augusta, Maine
- Died: January 9, 2000 (aged 76)
- Education: Reed College (B.A.); Stanford University (M.A.)
- Occupation: Journalist
- Spouse: Susan Wheat (m. 1954)
- Children: Ann, Daniel, Elizabeth, Katharine, Marilyn, Lauren
- Writing career
- Subjects: Wood industry, national reporting
- Notable awards: Pulitzer Prize for National Reporting; 1961; Gerald Loeb Award; 1961

Edward R. Cony (March 15, 1923 – January 9, 2000) was an American journalist and newspaper executive who spent almost his entire career working for The Wall Street Journal or its parent company, Dow Jones. He won the Pulitzer Prize for National Reporting in 1961.

== Early life and education ==
Cony was born in Augusta, Maine, the son of Daniel William Cony and Mary (Doyle) Cony. He attended Colby College and received a B.A. from Reed College, where he majored in political science and wrote a thesis on the Fair Employment Practice Commission under Prof. Maure Goldschmidt. He then earned an MA from Stanford University.

== Career ==
Cony served in the U.S. Army from 1943 to 1946.

He began his journalism career as a reporter for the Portland Oregonian, for which he worked from 1951 to 1952. He was a freelance magazine writer between 1952–53.

He then joined the Wall Street Journal, working as a staff member for the newspaper's San Francisco bureau (1953–55), as manager of its Los Angeles bureau (1955–57), as head of its Jacksonville bureau (1957–59), as a staff member based in New York (1959–60), as a news editor in New York (1960–64), as the assistant managing editor of its Pacific Coast Edition (1964–65), as the managing editor of the Wall Street Journal (1965–70), the newspaper's highest-ranking post.

He then served as executive editor of Dow Jones publications and news services (1970), as a vice president of Dow Jones (1972–86), as president of the Dow Jones division that published The Wall Street Journal Asia (1976–80), and as vice president for news at Dow Jones (1977–88). In 1980 he was elected to the board of Ottaway Newspapers, a Dow Jones subsidiary.

He was also president of the Dow Jones Newspaper Fund from 1981 to 1988. From 1986 to 1988 he served as an associate editor of the Wall Street Journal. He retired in 1988. He had spent all but six months of his 35-year career as a journalist working for the Wall Street Journal or for its parent company, Dow Jones.

According to his New York Times obituary, "Cony announced that he had Alzheimer's in March 1988, a few weeks before he was to have become president of the American Society of Newspaper Editors. Although he had decided not to take the post, the society's board elected him president before accepting his resignation a few hours later."

He spent his last five years in a nursing home in Santa Cruz, California, and died there of pneumonia and complications from Alzheimer's.

=== Comments on journalism ===
One strength of the Wall Street Journal, Cony said on C-SPAN in 1985, is that "we try to spot trends and then do in-depth stories on those trends."

=== Other professional activities ===
Cony served as a trustee of Reed College from 1974 to 1990. He "was deeply involved in defending First Amendment freedom of press and was a frequent speaker (sometimes at Reed) on the topic of rights and responsibilities of the media."

Cony joined the American Society of Newspaper Editors in 1971. At one point he served as president of the Associated Press Managing Editors.

== Honors and awards ==
In 1961, he received the Pulitzer Prize for National Reporting for a series of articles about business ethics in the timber industry. The prize board praised his analysis of a timber transaction between Georgia-Pacific Corporation and one of its directors, who was also the president of a major insurance company, saying that it had drawn attention to the issue of business ethics.

He also won the Gerald Loeb Award in 1961, sharing it with several other Wall Street Journal reporters who had collaborated on a series entitled "New Millionaires."

== Personal life ==
Cony married Susan Wheat in 1954. They had six children, Ann, Daniel, Elizabeth, Katharine, Marilyn, and Lauren. He was a Roman Catholic and "was known for not tolerating phonies."

== Praise ==
"Ed was extraordinarily intelligent, possessed of a wonderful wit, an easy sense of humor, and absolute integrity," wrote Barron's columnist Alan Abelson after Cony's death. "Pure and simple, he was the best newspaperman we've ever known, and, we're absolutely convinced, there never has been a better one, anywhere, ever." Walter Mintz, chairman of the Reed board of trustees, called Abelson's description of Cony "absolutely accurate. Ed was a dear and close friend, and his terrible illness was an enormous tragedy."

Larry O'Donnell, also a former managing editor of the Wall Street Journal, called Cony a mentor, saying: "Ed Cony had a profound and deep impact on his newsroom colleagues. Reporters wanted to work on stories with Ed — and learned much when they did." O'Donnell said that Cony, as managing editor, had "hired the paper’s first black newsroom staffers and pushed for a diverse newsroom throughout his career." O'Donnell added that Cony had "also put into writing the Journal’s conflict-of-interest policies — decades before other newspapers did." O'Donnell also recalled Cony's "great sense of humor."
