= 1946 Pulitzer Prize =

Awards for journalism and related fields

The following are the Pulitzer Prizes for 1946.

== Journalism awards ==
- Public Service:
  - Scranton Times for its fifteen-year investigation of judicial practices in the United States District Court for the middle district of Pennsylvania, resulting in the removal of District Judge Albert W. Johnson and indictment of many others.
- Reporting:
  - William L. Laurence of The New York Times for his eye-witness account of the atom-bombing of Nagasaki and his subsequent ten articles on the development, production, and significance of the atomic bomb.
- Correspondence:
  - Arnaldo Cortesi of The New York Times for distinguished correspondence during the year 1945, as exemplified by his reports from Buenos Aires, Argentina.
- Telegraphic Reporting (National):
  - Edward A. Harris of the St. Louis Post-Dispatch for his articles on the Tidewater Oil situation which contributed to the nationwide opposition to the appointment and confirmation of Edwin W. Pauley as Undersecretary of the Navy.
- Telegraphic Reporting (International):
  - Homer Bigart of the New York Herald Tribune for his distinguished reporting during the year 1945 from the Pacific war theatre.
- Editorial Writing:
  - Hodding Carter of The Delta Democrat-Times (Greenville, Mississippi) for a group of editorials, exemplified by "Go for Broke", published during the year 1945 on the subject of racial, religious and economic intolerance.

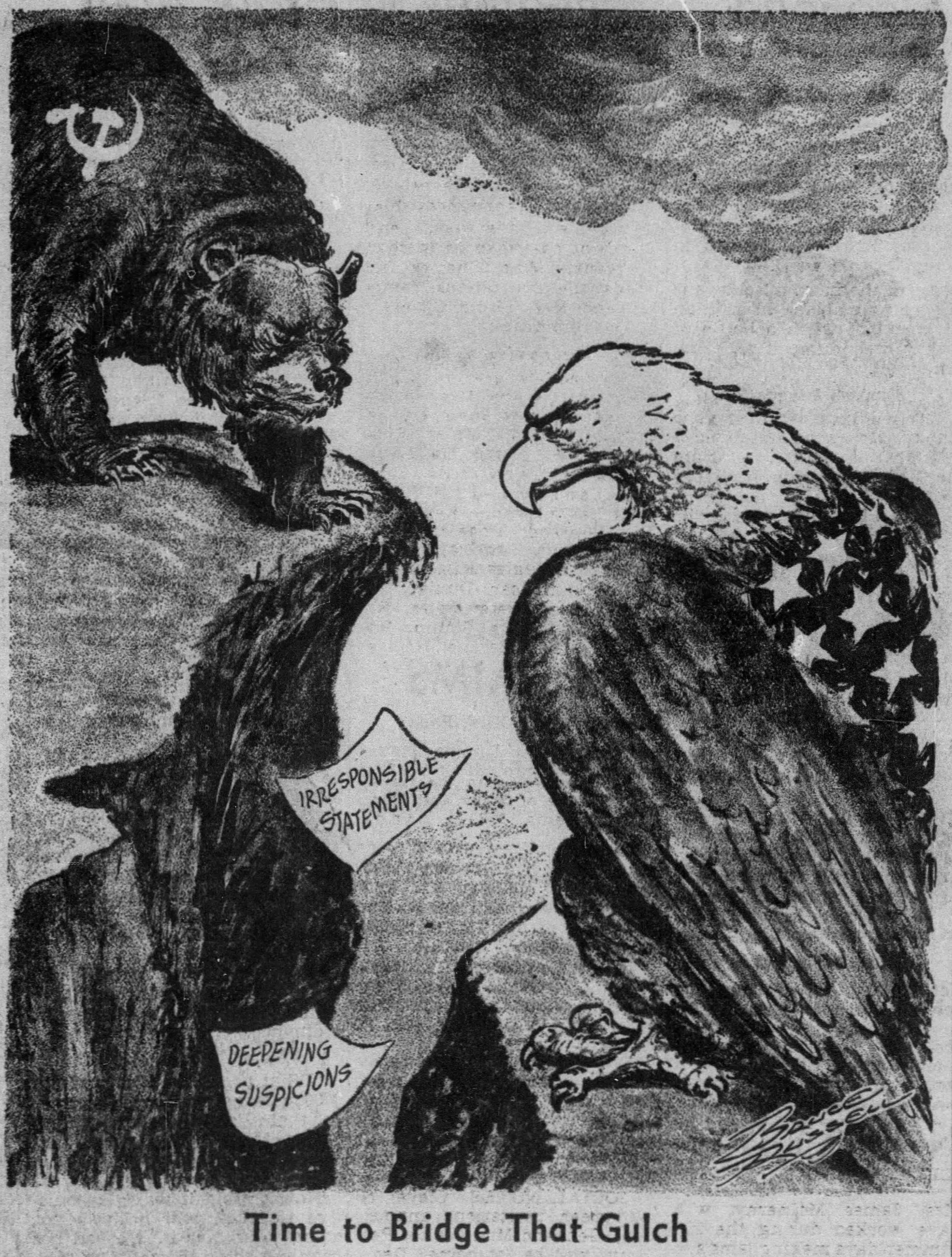
"Time to Bridge That Gulch", the prize-winning editorial cartoon

- Editorial Cartooning:
  - Bruce Alexander Russell of the Los Angeles Times for "Time to Bridge That Gulch".
- Photography:
  - No award was given, because the previous year's prizes had already honored a 1945 photograph, "Raising the Flag on Iwo Jima", for which the prize committee had set aside the usual deadline.

== Letters, Drama and Music Awards ==
- Novel:
  - No award given.
- Drama:
  - State of the Union by Russel Crouse and Howard Lindsay (Random).
- History:
  - The Age of Jackson by Arthur Schlesinger, Jr. (Little)
- Biography or Autobiography:
  - Son of the Wilderness by Linnie Marsh Wolfe (Knopf).
- Poetry:
  - No award given.
- Music:
  - Canticle of the Sun by Leo Sowerby (H. W. Gray) commissioned by the Alice M Ditson Fund, first performed by the Schola Cantorum in New York, April 1945.
