= Marjie Lundstrom =

American journalist

- Born: 1956 (age 69–70)
- Education: University of Nebraska–Lincoln
- Occupations: Journalist, Editor
- Employer(s): CALMatters; FairWarning, Pasadena, CA
- Known for: 1991 Pulitzer Prize for National Reporting
- Title: Deputy Editor
- Spouse: Sam Stanton

Marjie Lundstrom (born 1956) is an American journalist. She received the Pulitzer Prize for National Reporting in 1991. Lundstrom has worked for The Fort Collins Coloradoan, the Denver Monthly, and The Denver Post. She was a reporter and senior writer for The Sacramento Bee. Currently, she is the deputy editor for two nonprofit publications, FairWarning, located in Pasadena, CA, and CalMatters, based in Sacramento.

== Background and career ==
Marjie Lundstrom was born in 1956. Her parents, Dr. and Mrs. Max Lundstrom, are from Wayne, Nebraska.

She graduated from the University of Nebraska–Lincoln, College of Journalism and Mass Communications in 1978. When she enrolled, she didn't have a clear career goal, saying she "stumbled into journalism." Lundstrom went on to become the fourth graduate to win the Pulitzer Prize for journalism at UNL. In 1977 she wrote her autobiography, while a junior at the school.

Early in her career, Lundstrom served as a staff member with The Fort Collins Coloradoan, the Denver Monthly, and The Denver Post. She was a reporter and senior writer for The Sacramento Bee, for 29 years, taking a temporary break in 1990 to work for Gannett news service, where she and a fellow journalist wrote a Pulitzer Prize winning story on child abuse.

In 2019 Lundstrom began working with FairWarning, a nonpartisan, nonprofit organization, based in southern California. Their investigative stories cover consumer protection, labor, public health, and transportation safety. In 2020 she joined the team at CalMatters, another nonpartisan, nonprofit organization, which focuses on issues important to the lives of California residents and government accountability. She is currently the deputy editor of both publications.

== Awards and recognition ==
- 1991 Winner, Pulitzer Prize for National Reporting, (with Rochelle Sharpe) Gannett, for a four-part series of reports on child abuse related deaths
- 2008 Honoree, Recognized by the California Newspaper Publishers Association for her lifelong commitment to the public's right to know
- 2009 Winner, First Amendment Award, Society of Professional Journalists, (with her husband, Sam Stanton), Sacramento Bee, for a two-part series called "Unprotected", and follow up stories by her husband, Sam Stanton
- 2011 Finalist, the Taylor Family Award for Fairness in Newspapers for "Who Killed Amariana?"
- 2011 Winner, Anna Quindlen Award for Excellence in Journalism on Behalf of Children and Families, Sacramento Bee, "Who Killed Amariana?", a three-part series about the death of a foster child
- 2012 Winner, Price Child Health and Welfare Journalism Award, University of San Diego, for Daily Newspapers, Sacramento Bee, "The Girl With 100 Scars"
