= Edward A. Harris =

American journalist

- Born: Edward Arnold Harris; October 20, 1910; St. Louis, Missouri
- Died: March 14, 1976 (aged 65); Front Royal, Virginia
- Education: Master of Arts
- Alma mater: Washington University in St. Louis; University of California, Los Angeles
- Occupation: Journalist
- Spouse: Miriam Sima Levy (m. 1938)
- Children: Linda Gail, Mark Geoffrey, Robert Nathaniel
- Writing career
- Subjects: National and local politics
- Notable awards: Pulitzer Prize for Telegraphic Reporting; 1946

Edward Arnold Harris (October 20, 1910 – March 14, 1976) was an American journalist. He was a longtime reporter for the St. Louis Post-Dispatch and a winner of the Pulitzer Prize in 1946.

== Early life and education ==
Harris was born in St. Louis, the son of Nathan Harris and Rose (Goldman) Harris. He graduated from Washington University in St. Louis with an A.B. Degree in 1933.

He later earned a master's degree from the University of California, Los Angeles.

== Career ==
=== St. Louis and Washington ===
From 1931 to 1933, while he was still a student, Harris served as campus correspondent for the St. Louis Star-Times. After graduating from university, he became a general reporter and columnist for that newspaper, working there until 1940.

Between 1936 and 1943, he also served as the St. Louis correspondent for the TimeLife publications, Time magazine, Life magazine, and Fortune magazine.

In 1940 he became a City Hall reporter for the St. Louis Post-Dispatch. From 1940 to 1943, he was a rewrite specialist, reporter, and local political writer for that newspaper. In 1943, he was assigned to the newspaper's Washington bureau, from which he covered the White House, Congress, presidential elections, and national political conventions. He also focused on civil liberties and corruption. He continued to work in the Washington bureau until 1954.

An account of the Truman presidency notes that at a presidential press conference, Harris "almost had his head taken off by Truman for asking whether the president and General MacArthur were finally in agreement over Formosa." Truman replied to Harris: "Let me tell you something that will be good for your soul....It's a pity that you columnists and reporters...can't understand the ideas of two intellectually honest men when they meet." Stating that MacArthur was loyal to both the government and president, Truman added that he wished "a lot of your papers" were loyal in the same way.

=== Pauley case ===
When President Truman appointed Edwin W. Pauley, an oilman and former Democratic Party treasurer, to be Undersecretary of the Navy in 1946, Pauley's effort to prevent government control of tidewater oil reserves by offering a substantial contribution to the party was uncovered in a series of articles by Harris. The revelations turned the public against the appointment, led Secretary of the Interior Harold Ickes to resign in protest against the appointment, and made Pauley's confirmation impossible. The articles won Harris the Pulitzer Prize.

=== After Washington ===
After leaving Washington, Harris served as chief of the Post-Dispatch's West Coast bureau. In 1957, he took a leave of absence to study for an M.S. degree from the University of California at Los Angeles.

In 1959, according to his obituary in The New York Times, Harris "left journalism to enter the real estate business in Virginia." In the same year, he bought Hidden Valley Farm, located in the foothills of the Blue Ridge Mountains in Virginia. From that date on, he was a working farmer. Between 1960 and 1963 he also wrote a weekly syndicated agricultural column entitled "Down on the Farm." One source states that he was president of Edward A. Harris & Associates from 1963 to 1976.

=== Books ===
Harris contributed to a 1946 book entitled Public Men, in and out of Office, edited by J. T. Salter.

In 1958 he published a book entitled Love Thy Neighbor.

== Personal life ==
Harris married Miriam Sima Levy in 1938. They had three children.

He was an "able amateur hypnotist," as Life magazine reported in a photo spread in November 1941.

== Honors and awards ==
Harris was awarded the 1946 Pulitzer Prize for Telegraphic Reporting (National).

He also received the following awards:

- Journalism Award, Fontbonne College, MO 1947
- Alumni Citation, Washington University in St. Louis, MO, 1957
- Award of Distinction, UCLA Department of Journalism, 1958
- Agricultural Writers' Award, 1961
