= Jeff Taylor (journalist) =

American journalist

Jeffrey Taylor is an American journalist who won a Pulitzer Prize.

== Biography ==
Taylor grew up in Kansas and is a graduate of the University of Kansas. He began his career as a reporter at The Kansas City Star newspaper in 1985. In 1991, he and fellow Star reporter Mike McGraw wrote an investigative series on the U.S. Department of Agriculture, for which they won the Pulitzer Prize for National Reporting.

In 1995, Taylor joined the Detroit Free Press, where he shared a 2000 Gerald Loeb Award for "A Killer in Our Food". In 2009, Taylor was managing editor for news at the Free Press when the newspaper's staff won a Pulitzer Prize for their reporting on the corruption of former Detroit mayor Kwame Kilpatrick. Taylor was intimately involved in editing on the Kilpatrick stories.

In July 2012, Taylor replaced Dennis Ryerson as editor of The Indianapolis Star. Taylor oversaw an investigative effort that won wide acclaim for uncovering widespread sexual abuse within USA Gymnastics. The investigative reporting helped secure the conviction and imprisonment of former team physician Larry Nassar, who was convicted of sexual assault of minors and other charges, and prompted the ouster of Steve Penny as USAG's chief executive officer.

In March 2018, Taylor was named Executive Editor for news at USA TODAY. He supervised all news operations for the Nation desk, Politics, Washington and World, and Money & Technology. He became Vice President and Executive Editor for News & Investigations in 2022.

Taylor returned to local journalism in August 2023 when he joined The Post and Courier in Charleston, SC, as executive editor and vice president for news, assuming responsibility for the company's growing news operations in multiple cities across the state.
