= Gilbert M. Gaul =

American journalist (born 1951)

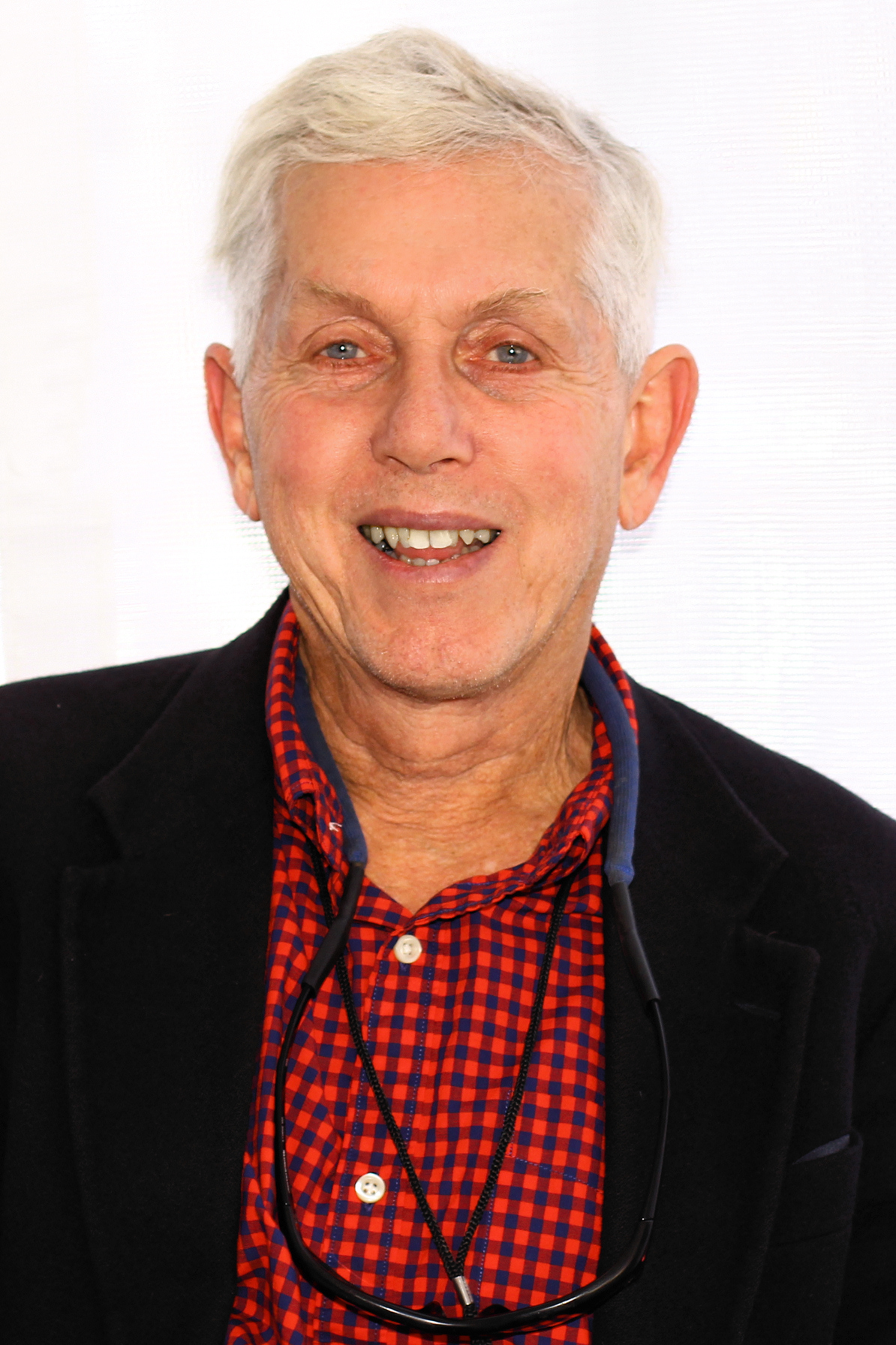
Gaul at the 2019 Texas Book Festival

Gilbert Martin Gaul (born May 18, 1951) is an American journalist. He has won two Pulitzer Prizes and been a finalist for four others.

== Biography ==
Gilbert Martin Gaul was born in Jersey City, New Jersey. Growing up in nearby Kearny, Gaul attended St. Benedict's Prep in Newark, where he was a state champion in the javelin throw. He graduated from Fairleigh Dickinson University in 1973.

After working as a teacher for three years, Gaul became a news reporter at the Times-News in Lehighton, Pennsylvania, in 1976. In January 1978, Gaul joined The Pottsville Republican in Pottsville, Pennsylvania. There, he teamed with Elliot Jaspin on a five-part series on the collapse of the huge Blue Coal Corporation, once one of the largest producers of soft coal. For their efforts, they shared the 1979 Pulitzer Prize for Investigative Reporting, citing "stories on the destruction of the Blue Coal Company by men with ties to organized crime", among other national reporting awards. In 1980, Gaul worked for the Philadelphia Bulletin covering Atlantic City, which recently had added casino gaming. He returned to Pottsville a year later and worked on a series detailing millions in waste in the county government, which won a National Headliners Award for investigative reporting.

In 1982–1983, Gaul was a Nieman Fellow. The Nieman Fellowship is an award given to mid-career journalists by the Nieman Foundation for Journalism at Harvard University. This award allows winners time to reflect on their careers and focus on honing their skills, at Harvard University, where he studied business, law and public health. He briefly returned to Pottsville and then moved to The Philadelphia Inquirer, covering medical economics on the business staff. In 1989, Gaul wrote a five-part series on the business of buying and selling human blood, as well as safety flaws in the nation's blood system. The Inquirer won the 1990 Pulitzer Prize for Public Service citing "reporting by Gilbert M. Gaul that disclosed how the American blood industry operates with little government regulation or supervision." Meanwhile, Gaul was personally a finalist for the National Reporting Pulitzer. In all, Gaul worked at The Inquirer for 18 years. In 1994, he was again finalist for the National Reporting Pulitzer, for a series disclosing the explosive growth of non-profit organizations and their impact on the economy and tax laws. The series won numerous awards, including the Harvard Goldsmith Prize for Investigative Reporting. In 2001, Gaul was finalist for the National Reporting Pulitzer for a five-part series on the business and commercialization of college sports. (On all three occasions there were three Pulitzer Prize for National Reporting finalists, the winner and two runners-up.)

In 2000, Gaul briefly worked at The New York Times and in 2001 joined the national investigative staff at The Washington Post, where he remained through 2009. While there, Gaul authored a number of series, including a 2006 detailing $15 billion in waste in federal agricultural subsidies that was a Pulitzer finalist in National Reporting. Dan Morgan and Sara Cohen worked with Gaul on the series.

In 2010, Gaul became a contributing writer to the non-profit Kaiser Health News, specializing in enterprise and long-form stories.

He is also the author of four books, including Giant Steps, a chronicle of his son, Cary, who was born with spina bifida, and BILLION-DOLLAR BALL, named one of the best sports books of 2015.

Gaul is married to Cathryn Candy, an art teacher. His older son, Gregory, a Princeton graduate, lives and works in Tennessee.

== Quotes ==
On Wikipedia:

there is no way for me to verify the information without fact-checking, in which case it isn't really saving me any time....I like much of the new technology... But to me rules, borders, guidelines and transparency matter a lot, I need and want to be able to trust the people I am reading or chatting with. If I can't, what is the point?

On college sports:

From where I sit, college presidents really don’t want to take responsibility for the college sports mess. To do so would require them to offend their powerful athletic departments and alumni. It is a no-win situation. And as we already know, in college sports, winning is everything.

== Works ==
- Giant Steps: A Story of One Boy's Struggle to Walk, St. Martin's Press, 1993, ISBN 978-0-312-08729-6
- Free Ride: The Tax-Exempt Economy (with Neill A. Borowski), Andrews and McMeel, 1993, ISBN 978-0-8362-8029-6
- Crisis on the Coast: The Risky Development of America's Shores (with Anthony R. Wood), The Philadelphia Inquirer, 2000 ISBN 9781588220011
- John McPhee; Carol Rigolot, eds. (2010). "Internet Gambling". The Princeton Reader: Contemporary Essays by Writers and Journalists at Princeton University. Princeton University Press. ISBN 978-0-691-14308-8.
- Billion-Dollar Ball: A Journey Through the Big-Money Culture of College Football, Viking, 2015, ISBN 9780670016730
- The Geography of Risk: Epic Storms, Rising Seas, and the Cost of America's Coasts, Farrar, Straus and Giroux, 2019, ISBN 978-0-374-16080-7

== See also ==
- Economics of climate change mitigation
