= George Rodrigue (journalist) =

American journalist

George Rodrigue is a Pulitzer Prize winning journalist who was the editor-in-chief of The Plain Dealer in Cleveland, Ohio from 2015 to 2020.
