= Jeff Kosseff =

American legal scholar

- Occupations: Journalist; Lawyer

Academic background
- Education: University of Michigan (BA, MA); Georgetown University (JD)

Academic work
- Discipline: Cybersecurity
- Institutions: United States Naval Academy

Jeff Kosseff is a professor at the University of Minnesota Law School. Until 2026, he was a professor of cybersecurity law at the United States Naval Academy. He was previously a journalist, and was a finalist for the Pulitzer Prize and recipient of the George Polk Award.

== Education ==
Kosseff graduated from the University of Michigan with bachelor's and master's degrees. He received a doctorate of jurisprudence from Georgetown University Law Center.

== Journalism ==
As a journalist, Kosseff started working for The Oregonian in 2001 covering technology, and worked from its Washington, D.C. bureau from 2004 through 2008. He won the George Polk Award in 2006 and was a finalist for the Pulitzer Prize for National Reporting in 2007.

== Legal career ==
Kosseff clerked for Judge Milan Smith of the U.S. Court of Appeals for the Ninth Circuit and Judge Leonie Brinkema of the U.S. District Court for the Eastern District of Virginia.

From 2015 to 2026, he taught, researched, and wrote about cybersecurity law at the United States Naval Academy, where he was an associate professor in the Cyber Science department. He is taking over as the Director of the Silha Center for the Study of Media Ethics and Law at the University of Minnesota.

Previously, as a lawyer at Covington & Burling LLP, he represented media and technology companies in a wide range of First Amendment and privacy issues. Among his representative matters, he advocated for federal shield law for journalists on behalf of a coalition of more than 70 media organizations. He frequently writes and speaks about the First Amendment and privacy law. The Information & Privacy Commissioner of Ontario has named Kosseff a Privacy by Design Ambassador. Kosseff is an adjunct professor of communications law at American University's School of Communications, and he serves on the board of directors of the Writer's Center in Bethesda and Advocates for Survivors of Torture and Trauma in Washington, D.C.

== Personal life ==
Until assuming his new position in Minnesota, he lived with his wife and daughter in the Washington, D.C. area.

== Bibliography ==
- Kosseff, Jeff (2019). The Twenty-Six Words That Created the Internet. Cornell University Press. ISBN 978-1501735783.
- Kosseff, Jeff (2022). The United States of Anonymous: How the First Amendment Shaped Online Speech. Cornell University Press. ISBN 978-1501762383.
- Kosseff, J. (2023). Liar in a crowded theater: Freedom of speech in a world of misinformation. Johns Hopkins University Press. ISBN 978-1421447322.
