= Richard L. Wilson =

American journalist

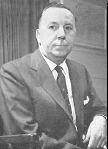
Richard L. Wilson, c. 1960

Richard Lawson Wilson (September 3, 1905 – January 18, 1981) was an American journalist.

Wilson was born in Galesburg, Illinois, and raised in Newton, Iowa. He was the son of Frank and Emily (McCord) Wilson, and was the youngest of nine children.

He attended the University of Iowa, at Iowa City, Iowa. There he met and later married fellow journalist Katherine Y. Macy, a graduate of the University of Iowa and the Columbia University School of Journalism.

After receiving his B.A. in 1926, he began his reporting career at The Des Moines Register in Des Moines, Iowa. After a year at the St. Louis Post-Dispatch in 1928, he returned to Des Moines as City Editor and then to Washington, D.C., in 1933 to set up the Washington bureau of the Register, at that time owned by the Cowles family, who owned newspapers in the Midwest and published the now-defunct Look magazine. He became chief of the Washington bureau for all Cowles publications in 1950, and occupied that post until his retirement in 1970. Wilson was elected President of the National Press Club for the year 1940. He was also very active in the Gridiron Club.

During World War II, Wilson travelled extensively abroad as a war correspondent. In 1954, he was awarded the Pulitzer Prize for National Reporting, "[f]or his exclusive publication of the FBI Report to the White House in the Harry Dexter White case before it was laid before the Senate by J. Edgar Hoover."

Wilson retired from active newspaper reporting in 1970, and wrote a nationally syndicated column until 1976. He died on January 18, 1981, in Washington, D.C., of complications from mycosis fungoides, a non-Hodgkin's lymphoma. He is buried in Rock Creek Cemetery in Washington, D.C.

He received Sigma Delta Chi's annual award for Washington reporting and was a member of the University of Iowa's Journalism-Mass Communications Hall of Fame.

Wilson and his wife had two children. Katherine M. Wilson died of pneumonia in Minneapolis, Minnesota, on January 20, 1989; she had been suffering from Alzheimer's disease. She was buried next to her husband.

Wilson's professional papers are at Herbert Hoover Presidential Library in West Branch, Iowa. He is among many people whose conversation was captured on President Nixon's "secret tapes."
