= The Plain Dealer =

Major newspaper of Cleveland, Ohio, US

- Front page for April 13, 2023
- Type: Daily newspaper
- Format: Broadsheet
- Owner(s): Advance Publications (Newhouse Newspapers)
- Founded: 1842; 184 years ago
- Headquarters: Plain Dealer Publishing Co; 4800 Tiedeman Road; Brooklyn, Ohio 44144; U.S. 41°30′25.5″N 81°40′47.2″W
- Circulation: 94,838 Daily; 171,404 Sunday
- ISSN: 2641-404X (print); 2641-4058 (web)
- OCLC number: 7742580
- Website: cleveland.com; plaindealer.com

The Plain Dealer is the primary newspaper of Cleveland, Ohio. In the fall of 2019, it ranked 23rd in U.S. newspaper circulation, a significant drop since March 2013, when its circulation ranked 17th daily and 15th on Sunday.

As of May 2019, The Plain Dealer had 94,838 daily readers and 171,404 readers on Sunday. The Plain Dealer's media market, the Cleveland-Akron Designated Market Area, has a population of 3.8 million people making it the 19th-largest market in the United States.

As of 2023, Sunday print circulation had declined to 37,000 copies.

In August 2013, The Plain Dealer reduced home delivery to four days a week, including Sunday. A daily version of The Plain Dealer was available electronically as well as in print at stores, newsracks and newsstands.

== History ==
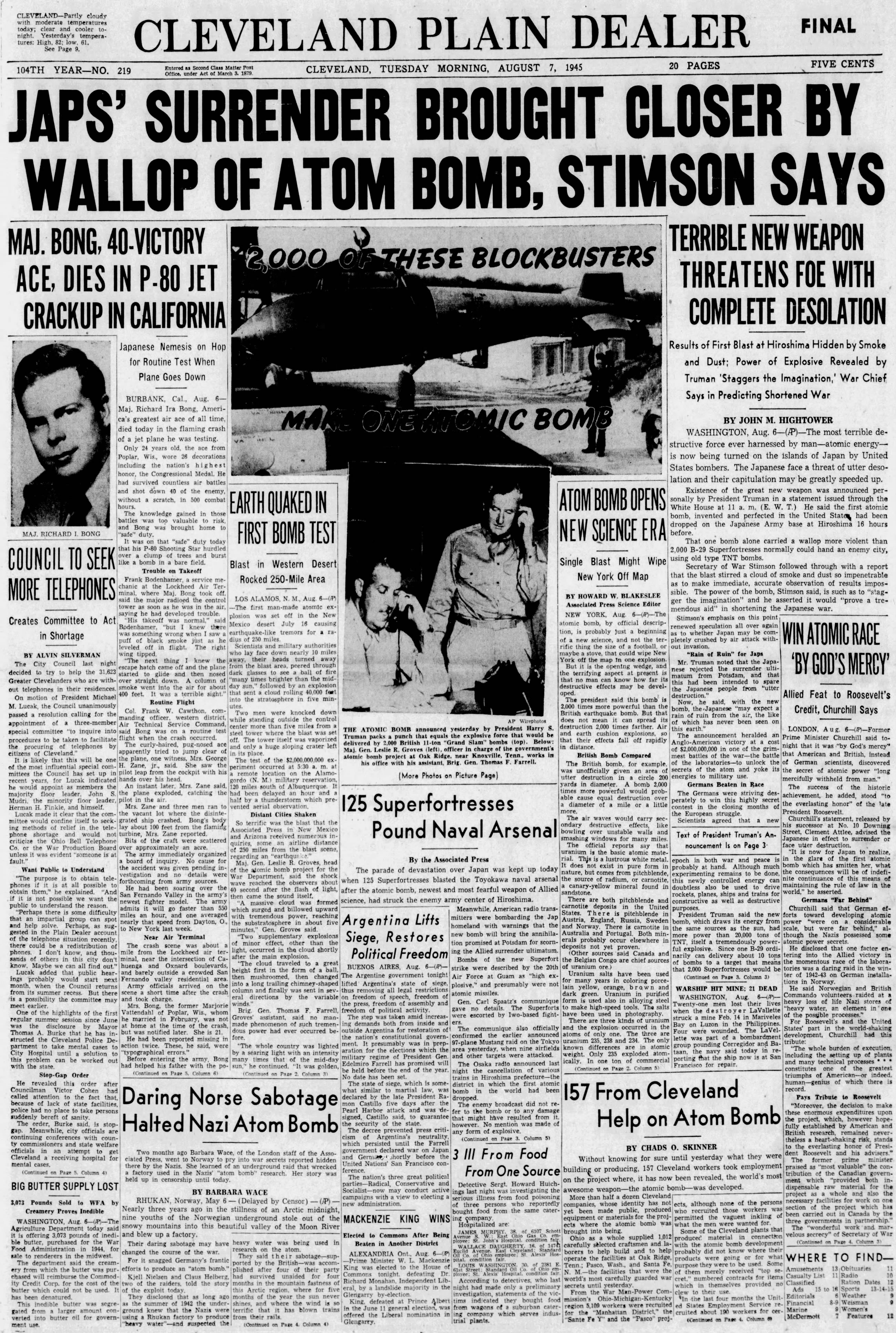
Front page on August 7, 1945, covering the atomic bombing of Hiroshima, Japan

=== Founding ===
The newspaper was established in January 1842 when two brothers, Joseph William Gray and Admiral Nelson Gray, took over The Cleveland Advertiser and changed its name to The Plain Dealer. The Cleveland Advertiser had been published from 1831 to 1841. Some sources attribute the current spelling of the city name to The Cleveland Advertiser's dropping the first "a" from the name of the city's founder, Moses Cleaveland, so the newspaper's name would fit on the masthead but others dispute that story.

=== Name ===
When the Gray brothers began publishing their newspaper in 1842, they wrote an explanation of their choice of name; after a discussion of several other possible names, they wrote, "but our democracy and modesty suggest the only name that befits the occasion, the PLAIN DEALER." The phrase means "someone who interacts or does business straightforwardly and honestly". Their choice of name was probably inspired by The Plaindealer, a weekly paper described as Jacksonian or radical, published in New York City by William Leggett from 1836 to either 1837 or 1839. Several other newspapers in California, Colorado, Indiana, Iowa, Montana, Oregon, Wisconsin, Manitoba, and South Australia later adopted versions of the same name in the 19th and early 20th centuries. At least three continue: Indiana Plain Dealer, a 2024 combination of newspapers including the former Wabash Plain Dealer, which had served Wabash, Indiana since 1859; the Ouray County Plaindealer of Ouray County, Colorado under names that included "Plaindealer" during 1888–1939 and since 1969; and the Cresco Times Plain Dealer of Cresco, Iowa. Winston Churchill reportedly said about the Cleveland paper, "I think that by all odds, the Plain Dealer has the best newspaper name of any in the world." Although its first edition in 1842 was captioned simply "The Plain Dealer", the name on the newspaper's masthead included "Cleveland" for much of its history, and dropped the city name sometime between 1965 and 1970.

=== Ownership history ===
Joseph William Gray owned (initially with his brother) and edited the newspaper from 1842 until his death in 1862. A series of editors controlled the paper between then and 1885, when real estate investor Liberty Emery Holden purchased it. When Holden died in 1913, ownership of the Plain Dealer was placed in trust for his heirs.

WHK (AM) and WJAY were purchased by United Broadcasting Company in 1934 and 1936, respectively. United Broadcasting company was owned by the Forest City Publishing Company, which in turn owned The Plain Dealer.

Until 1967, the paper's publishing company, The Plain Dealer Publishing Company, was part of the Forest City Publishing Company, which also published the Cleveland News until its closing in 1960. One of Holden's heirs, Holden's great-grandson Thomas Vail, became the paper's editor and publisher in 1963. On March 1, 1967, the Holden trustees, including Vail, sold the Plain Dealer to Samuel Irving Newhouse Sr.'s newspaper chain for $54.2 million, then the highest price ever paid for a U.S. newspaper. Advance Publications Inc., a New York-based media company owned by Newhouse's heirs, continues to own the Plain Dealer.

=== Competition ===
The Plain Dealer has been the sole major newspaper for Cleveland and Northeast Ohio since its two main 20th-century competitors, the Cleveland News and The Cleveland Press, closed in 1960 and 1982 respectively. However, since 2015, a number of nonprofit news outlets have begun reporting including the Cleveland Observer, Cleveland Documenters, The Land, and Signal Cleveland.

=== Awards and honors ===
- 2005 Pulitzer Prize for Commentary (Connie Schultz).
- 1953 Pulitzer Prize for Editorial Cartooning (Edward D. Kuekes for Aftermath)

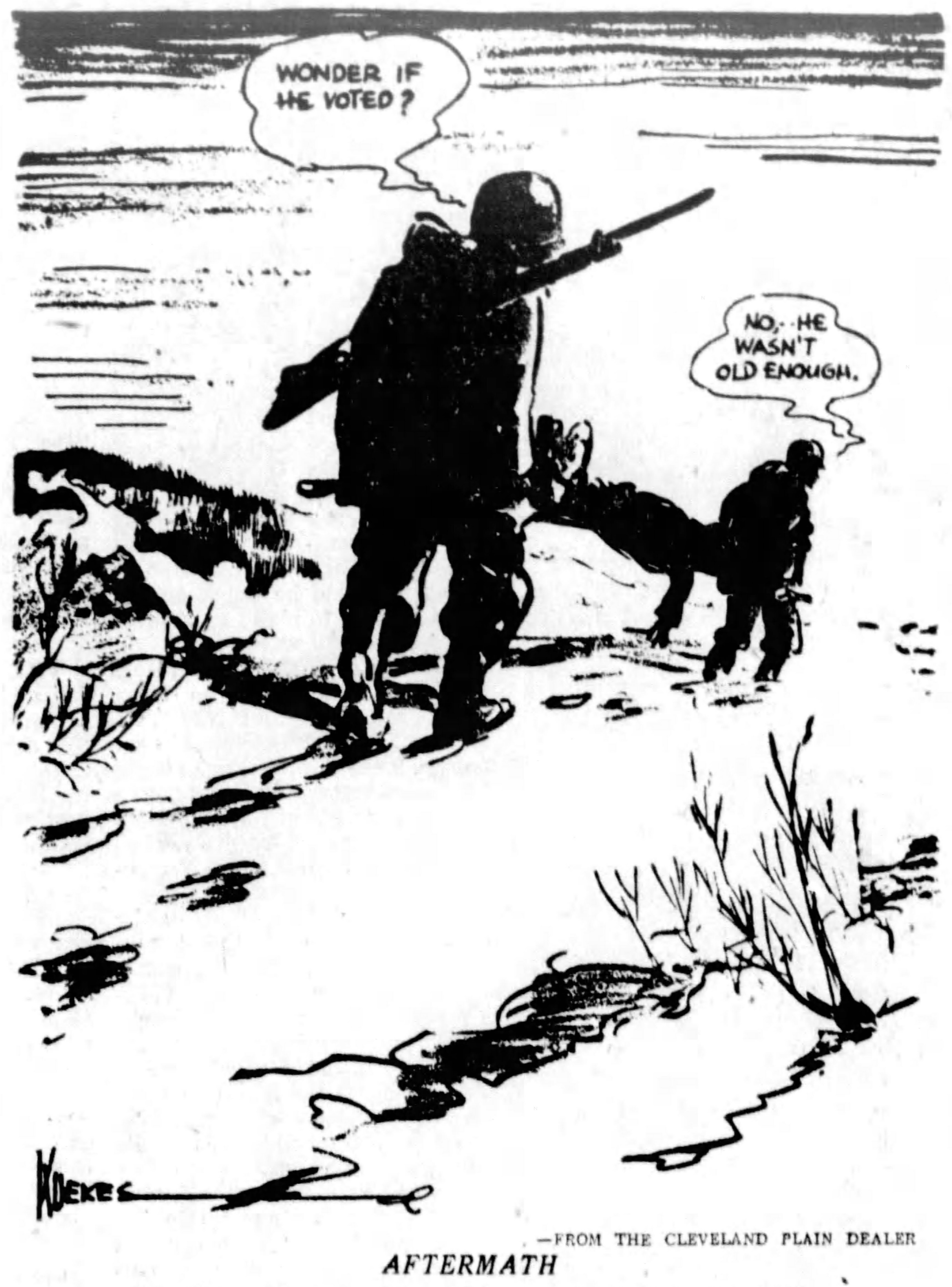
Aftermath, the 1953 Pulitzer Prize-winning editorial cartoon by Edward D. Kuekes

- 2008 Missouri Lifestyle Journalism Awards ("Coping when all is hopeless" by Diana Keough)
- 2006 Missouri Lifestyle Journalism Awards (Plain Dealer Sunday Magazine, and "In Balraj's Realm" by Karen R. Long)
- 2003 Editor & Publisher Editor of the Year Award (Doug Clifton)
- 12-time Ohio News Photographer's Association Award recipient (2001–2011, 2013).
- Nine-time Ohio Associated Press General Excellence Award winner:
  - 1994 (Division IV)
  - 2001, 2002, 2003, 2004, 2006, 2007, 2010, 2012 (Division V)
- Two-time Ohio Associated Press First Amendment Award recipient (2001, 2004)
- Numerous other AP Awards in various individual and specific categories (Division V)

=== Editors (Editors-in-Chief) ===
- Tim Warsinskey (March 1, 2020 – June 1, 2020)
- George Rodrigue (2015–2020)
- Debra Adams Simmons (2010–2014)
- Susan Goldberg (2007–2010)
- Doug Clifton (1999–2007)
- David Hall (1992–1999)
- Thomas Vail (as editor and publisher) (1963–1992)
  - David Hopcraft (executive editor) (1978–1984)
- Wright Bryan (1954–1963)
- Paul Bellamy (1933–1954)

== Cleveland.com ==
Cleveland.com, which was launched by Advance Publications in 1997, is the sister company of The Plain Dealer. Cleveland.com has only an online presence, while The Plain Dealer provides a print newspaper only, not a digital edition. Content from each is cross-posted on the other site. Cleveland.com is described by its owners as "the premier news and information website in the state of Ohio". Though it is under the same ownership as The Plain Dealer, Cleveland.com was operated by a separate company and had separate staff and offices.

=== History ===
The corporate structure underpinning these changes was the launch, announced in April 2013 and effective that August, of a "new, digitally focused company," also under ownership of Advance Publications, initially (in 2013) called the Northeast Ohio Media Group (NEOMG) and renamed in January 2016 as Advance Ohio. (The renaming happened several weeks after a major reorganization of the newsroom that included layoffs.) The original, older parent company, Plain Dealer Publishing Company, kept responsibility for The Plain Dealer (i.e., the print edition), only, while NEOMG gained responsibility for operating Cleveland.com and Sun Newspapers (also known as the Sun News suburban papers, a group of smaller, weekly, more suburban-oriented newspapers in the Greater Cleveland metro area also owned by Advance Publications). NEOMG was also made responsible for all ad sales and marketing for The Plain Dealer, Sun News, and Cleveland.com. Both NEOMG (later Advance Ohio) and the Plain Dealer Publishing Company provide content to The Plain Dealer and Cleveland.com.

One way that contemporary observers viewed the 2013 establishment of NEOMG, in conjunction with the termination of daily home delivery and personnel cuts of the same year, was as implementation by The Plain Dealer's owner, Advance Publications, of a strategy to change its business from daily delivery of a print newspaper to online delivery of news, as Advance had done when it ended daily delivery of the New Orleans Times-Picayune.

Another way that the formation of NEOMG has been viewed is as a strategy to weaken, and ultimately kill, a labor union, by moving tasks from the unionized Plain Dealer staff to the non-unionized staff at cleveland.com. Dividing The Plain Dealer into two separate companies—a unionized, print organization and a non-union, online organization—was dubbed a "transparent union-busting schism scheme" by Cleveland Scene an alternative weekly Cleveland newspaper. The labor union representing Plain Dealer employees was called, from its founding in 1933 until its closure in 2020 as a result of these changes, Newspaper Guild Local 1, because it was the first local chapter of the national union now called the NewsGuild. The Plain Dealer News Guild also called NEOMG's formation evidence of Advance's involvement in "union-busting", and repeated the claim in response to subsequent layoffs.

In February 2017, Advance Ohio named Chris Quinn editor and publisher. Quinn previously served as vice president of content at NEOMG and was the metro editor at The Plain Dealer prior to that.

In 2019, Cleveland.com was attracting an average of 9.9 million users monthly.

In Q4 of 2025 Cleveland.com attracted over 35.4 million page views.

==== Reviews ====
In 2006, Cleveland Magazine called Cleveland.com "mediocre compared to its peers", while saying that it "has only recently started to improve". In 2012, Cleveland Scene, the alternative weekly, said that "Advance's sites are notoriously poorly designed and borderline unnavigable" and, to demonstrate its non-local management, said that Advance wanted to give the Cleveland.com site a black-and-yellow color scheme, "until someone informed them those are Steelers colors".

== Shrinking in the 21st century ==
Since the late 20th century, like other media business organizations, the newspaper has faced reductions in circulation and revenue; it has undergone restructuring and layoffs.

=== Declining circulation ===
The paper's circulation declined from the 1980s through about the first decade of the twenty-first century, then dropped precipitously in the following decade or so; the following figures (using circulation numbers derived from the same source, though made public only in other sources and in a patchwork fashion) show that in the 24 years between 1983 and 2007 the paper's circulation dropped by 33% (daily) and 11% (Sunday), while in the next 12 years between 2007 and 2019, it lost a further 79% and 62% of its daily and Sunday circulation.

Date	Weekday circ.	Sunday circ.
May 13, 1983	497,386	501,042
2007	334,194	445,795
March 31, 2009	291,630	393,352
March 31, 2010	not avail.	362,394
Sep. 30, 2010	252,608	348,324
Sep. 30, 2011	243,299	344,089
March 31, 2013	216,122	301,806
May 2018	141,053	216,711
May 2019	94,838	171,404

=== Reductions in newspaper size and delivery ===
On December 18, 2005, The Plain Dealer ceased publication of its weekly Sunday Magazine, which had been published since 1919. Its demise was attributed to rising expenses and the poor economy. The editor of The Plain Dealer, Doug Clifton, said that stories that would formerly have appeared in the Sunday Magazine would be integrated into other areas of the paper. In June 2008, the paper announced that it would cut four sections and an average of 32 pages per week.

In August 2013, The Plain Dealer reduced home delivery from seven days a week to four: Wednesday, Friday, Saturday, and Sunday. It continued to publish an edition seven days a week that is available in electronic form at Cleveland.com, and in print at stores, newsracks and newsstands. Subscribers to the four print editions have access to the digital edition seven days a week. (Plans announced in April 2013 had called for a reduction to three days of delivery by August 2013, but Saturday delivery was retained after complaints from auto dealers, a major category of Saturday advertiser.)

=== Closure and transfer of bureaus ===
The Plain Dealer formerly operated a variety of news bureaus. By the middle of 2014, both the state capital bureau in Columbus and the Washington bureau were shifted to the Northeast Ohio Media Group, as shown by the affiliations of their bureau chiefs.

=== Elimination of staff, 2006–2020 ===
In the early 2000s, The Plain Dealer employed almost 350 reporters and editors; by 2020 that number was zero. The elimination of its entire staff took the form of a series of cuts between 2006 and 2020, described below.

==== 2006–2009 buyouts, staff cuts, and pay decrease ====
Between October and November 2006, about 64 employees, or one-sixth of those in the newsroom, accepted a buyout offer to leave the newspaper, reducing the newsroom staff from 372 to 308. In December 2008, the paper reduced its newsroom staff by 50 persons, or 20%; 27 accepted a buyout offer and then 23 more were fired.

In 2009, employees agreed to accept a 12% pay cut in exchange for a two-year no-layoff agreement.

==== 2013 cuts ====
In December 2012, members of the Newspaper Guild reported that The Plain Dealer management had told them that, after the January 2013 expiration of a no-layoff provision in the union's contract, it planned to eliminate about one-third of the newspaper's staff and cut 58 of 168 union positions.

Later in December 2012, the guild endorsed an agreement with Plain Dealer management accepting the expected layoffs of 58 journalists starting in May 2013, but restoring some of the pay cut union members had accepted in 2009, setting a severance package, and minimizing future layoffs through 2019 (to "just one more modest downsizing"). The agreement also allowed work to "flow freely" between The Plain Dealer and Cleveland.com, in particular changing the rules to allow work of non-union staff of Cleveland.com to be published in The Plain Dealer. Following the agreement about two dozen newsroom employees departed voluntarily.

On the morning of Wednesday, July 31, 2013, after having been told in April that layoffs expected for May were "on hold" until the summer, nearly one third of the newsroom staff was eliminated through layoffs and voluntary resignations. The 2013 round of layoffs led to accusations by the Guild that management had misled the union by cutting more employees than had been agreed upon in the 2012 agreement, specifically by reneging on a promise to keep at least 110 union jobs in the newsroom.

This concern was heightened when, within 24 hours after the layoffs, NEOMG hired away from The Plain Dealer thirteen of those who were not laid off, leaving 97 employees in the newsroom. The union filed a complaint with the NLRB which it settled in August 2014.

==== 2019 cuts ====
The Plain Dealer announced plans to lay off a third of its remaining unionized staff in December 2018 as part of a transition to a "centralized production system".

In March 2019, the paper laid off twelve (or fourteen) editors and reporters, and also outsourced its production, dropping another 24 jobs. Eight veteran reporters volunteered to take buyouts to spare others losing their jobs. Cleveland.com editor Chris Quinn blamed the parent organization's falling revenue on the print side of the operation. "It's just the falling circulation numbers in print, they continue to hamper us", Quinn said. "So we'll—you hate to see them go, they're veteran people, it's a lot of experience. Nothing matters more. But if it fits for where they are in their lives, and we can save some money, we're going for it." Rachel Dissell, a vice president of the News Guild, addressed Quinn's remarks, saying "we are baffled how print circulation can be blamed for buyouts at a digital company that we've been told again and again over five years is a separate entity from the Plain Dealer."

==== 2020 cuts ====
On March 3, 2020, The Plain Dealer announced that 22 more journalists would be laid off. Their departures were delayed by two weeks, however, because of the COVID-19 pandemic, leading to what was described as "a farewell blitz of vital reporting" on that topic by the soon-to-depart staff. On April 6, 2020, the Plain Dealer's editor announced that ten of its fourteen remaining reporters would be assigned to cover Ohio counties outside of Cleveland, rather than Cuyahoga County. The ten reporters asked to be laid off instead, and on April 10, 2020, they were. This left the Plain Dealer with a staff of four union journalists: investigative journalist John Caniglia, travel editor Susan Glaser, art critic Steven Litt, and sports columnist Terry Pluto.

On May 12, 2020, it was announced that the final four union journalists would be laid off and offered positions in the non-union Cleveland.com newsroom. Under an agreement with the Northeast Ohio Newspaper Guild, the guild would be barred from participating in union organizing activities in the Cleveland.com newsroom for one year. The same day, after three months of serving as Plain Dealer editor and overseeing this period of layoffs, Tim Warsinskey announced that he would be starting in a new role as the senior editor for Advance Local, the parent company of Cleveland.com on June 1, 2020.

These layoffs were the culmination of a drop over 20 years in membership in the United States' first News Guild (Local 1 of that union) from 340 members to zero.

== Politifact Ohio ==
In July 2010, The Plain Dealer launched PolitiFact Ohio, a website that analyzes political issues relevant to Ohio and the greater Cleveland area. It also conducted fact-checking and was produced in conjunction with its creator, the Tampa Bay Times. Four years later, the relationship was ended. Although the operation had generated criticism, the decision to drop it was attributed instead to a desire to keep all content on Cleveland.com rather than the separate PolitiFact Ohio site, which remains available as an archive.

== Pricing, distribution ==
The copy rates are $3 for daily or $5 on Sunday/Thanksgiving Day at newsstands/newsracks. The full subscription weekly price is $4.65. These prices only apply to The Plain Dealer's home delivery area, in these Northeast Ohio counties: Ashtabula, Cuyahoga, Erie, Geauga, Lake, Lorain, Medina, Ottawa, Portage & Summit. The Plain Dealer is available throughout the state at select newsstands including in the state capital, Columbus, and anywhere in the U.S. or world via U.S. mail service; prices are higher by mail.

== Cleveland.com criticism and controversies ==
=== Removal of debate video ===
In October 2014, the Northeast Ohio Media Group hosted the three Ohio candidates for governor in what would be their only joint appearance. The debate was held before the NEOMG's editorial board (which also serves as the editorial board of The Plain Dealer) and NEOMG reporters. Incumbent Gov. John Kasich, a Republican, largely ignored his main rival, Democrat Ed FitzGerald. Kasich refused to admit he could hear the questions of FitzGerald, who was sitting next to him and insisted that a reporter repeat them.

During the debate, a video camera was positioned eight feet in front of the candidates. The resulting video was posted on Cleveland.com. A few days later, however, it was removed. When other sites posted copies of the now-deleted video, the NEOMG sent letters threatening legal action. TechDirt reported that the owner of the Cleveland Plain Dealer had demanded that the unflattering video be taken down. The NEOMG's actions were covered by other media organizations and it was criticized by media observers. Chris Quinn, the NEOMG vice president who sent the letters, declined all requests for comment.

At 7 a.m. on the day after the election, which Kasich who was endorsed by the NEOMG won easily, the news organization posted online an explanation of events written by its reader representative. The column cited Quinn's explanation:

Shortly after the video was posted, the Kasich campaign contacted him and said it had not been aware a video would be posted online. Quinn eventually decided that his failure to explicitly explain the presence of a video camera was unfair. Further, "I thought that if I stated my reasons, the obvious next step would be people going to the candidates and asking them if they had any objection to putting the video back up," Quinn is quoted as saying. "That would mean my error could put people into an uncomfortable situation."

The explanation left some critics unsatisfied.

=== Tamir Rice coverage ===
As part of NEOMG's coverage of the 2014 shooting of Tamir Rice by Cleveland Police, NEOMG published a stories explaining that Rice's parents had criminal backgrounds. NEOMG Vice President of Content Chris Quinn attempted to justify reporting on the criminal backgrounds of Rice's parents in a follow-up piece, pointing out that Rice was playing with a toy gun that officers mistook for a real one at the time of the shooting. As a result, Quinn noted, many people asserted that the shooting was justified.

"One of the questions these people raise is why a 12-year-old was walking about in a public place, randomly aiming what looks like a real gun in various directions, to the point where a witness called 9-1-1 in fear," Quinn wrote in a piece defending his organization's reporting on the incident.

Quinn postulated, "One way to stop police from killing any more 12-year-olds might be to understand the forces that lead children to undertake behavior that could put them in the sights of police guns." Cleveland Scene, the alternative weekly, compared Quinn's explanation to "digging himself a hole the exact width and depth of a coffin" in a piece asserting that the narrative regarding Rice's parents' criminal histories "is absent any context whatsoever".

NEOMG's handling of the situation was condemned on a national scale by the Huffington Post, as well as internally by Plain Dealer staffers.

=== Artificial intelligence authorship ===
In 2026, it was reported that The Plain Dealer was using artificial intelligence to write first drafts of articles.

== PD criticism and controversies ==
=== Political leanings ===
In the presidential election of 1864, the paper was strongly opposed to the reelection of Abraham Lincoln. An editorial dated 5 November asked rhetorically, "Do you want four more years of war? Vote for Lincoln. Do you want the Constitution destroyed? Vote for Lincoln... Do you want the degraded Negros made your social and political equals? Vote for Lincoln."

The Plain Dealer has been criticized in the past by liberal columnists for staking out generally conservative positions on its editorial page, despite serving a predominantly Democratic readership base. In 2004, the editorial board voted to endorse Democratic U.S. Senator John Kerry; after publisher Alex Machaskee overruled it, ordering the board to write an endorsement of Republican George W. Bush, editorial page editor Brent Larkin persuaded Machaskee to withhold any endorsement. The news coverage is generally more neutral, with national and international news often culled from wire services including The New York Times.

The paper had been criticized as being too soft in its coverage of Senator George Voinovich from Ohio. It also was criticized in the 2004 election cycle for the U.S. Senate, not providing fair coverage if any to Voinovich's opponent, State Sen. Eric Fingerhut, a Democrat.

=== Publishing concealed weapons permit holder lists ===
In 2005, the newspaper twice published lists of concealed weapon permit holders from the five counties around Cleveland. Editor Doug Clifton defended the paper's decision, sparking a feud with a pro-carry lobbyist group. State Senator Steve Austria called it abuse of the media access privilege, saying publishing these names would threaten the safety of the men and women who obtain these permits. An Ohio gun rights group then published Clifton's home address and phone number.

=== "Held stories" controversy ===
The Plain Dealer made national headlines in summer 2005, when editor Douglas Clifton announced that the newspaper was withholding two stories "of profound importance" after Judith Miller of The New York Times and Matthew Cooper of Time magazine were ordered to reveal confidential sources who had provided information on Valerie Plame, Joseph Wilson's wife, being a CIA operative. Wilson was a prominent critic of the administration. The decision to compel the reporters to reveal sources was seen in the news media as a license to go after reporters and newspapers in the courtroom for not revealing confidential informants. It was considered a violation of the trust between reporter and said informants. Clifton was vilified in the news media as "having no backbone" and he admitted that people could refer to him as "chickenshit". Clifton told the national press that while he and the reporters involved in the story were willing to be jailed for not revealing sources, the legal department of the Plain Dealer Publishing Company was worried that the newspaper itself would be sued and strongly opposed the printing of the stories. "Talking isn't an option and jail is too high a price to pay", he said.

The controversy ended a month later, when Cleveland Scene, the alternative weekly, published a similar story. The Plain Dealer then printed its withheld story, a report that a federal corruption probe had targeted former Mayor Michael R. White. Both newspapers' stories were based on leaked documents. The second withheld story has not been revealed.

=== Music critic sidelined ===
On September 17, 2008, Donald Rosenberg, The Plain Dealer's music critic of sixteen years, was told by the paper's editor, Susan Goldberg, that he would no longer be covering performances of the Cleveland Orchestra. Rosenberg had criticized its performances under its conductor Franz Welser-Möst, although his reviews of Welser-Möst as a conductor of operas had been positive. Terrance C. Z. Egger, president and publisher of the paper, was on the orchestra's board.

Welser-Möst had been strongly criticized during his earlier tenure at the London Philharmonic Orchestra, when London critics gave him the nickname "Frankly Worse than Most". In December 2008, Rosenberg sued Cleveland's Musical Arts Association, the newspaper and several members of their staffs, alleging a conspiracy to have him demoted. Rosenberg dropped a number of claims against the paper in 2009. In August 2009, a jury rejected the remaining claims.

=== Shirley Strickland Saffold ===
In March 2010, The Plain Dealer reported that about eighty comments had been posted to articles on its web site by an account registered to the email address of Shirley Strickland Saffold, a judge sitting on the Cuyahoga County Court of Common Pleas. Several of the comments, posted under the pseudonym lawmiss, discussed matters that were or had been before the judge. Although the judge's 23-year-old daughter Sydney Saffold took responsibility for the postings, the paper was able to use a public records request and determine that the exact times and dates of some of the postings corresponded to the times that the corresponding articles were being viewed on the judge's court-issued computer. The revelation led one attorney, who had been criticized in the postings, to request the judge recuse herself from a homicide trial in which he represented the defendant. Ohio Supreme Court Acting Chief Justice Paul E. Pfeifer subsequently removed Saffold from the case.

In April, the judge sued the paper, its editor Susan Goldberg, and affiliated companies for $50 million claiming violation of its privacy policy. In December 2010, Saffold dropped the suit against the newspaper, and reached settlement with Advance Internet, The Plain Dealer affiliate which runs the newspaper's website. The terms of the settlement were undisclosed, but included a charitable contribution in the name of Saffold's mother.
