= David Wood (journalist) =

War journalist

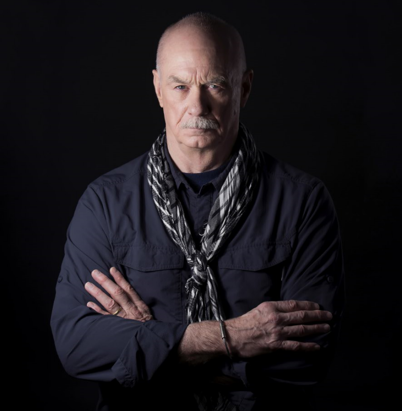
- Journalist David Wood
- Occupations: Journalist and author
- Website: www.davidwoodjournalist.com

David Bowne Wood is a journalist who has reported on war and conflict around the world. He won the 2012 Pulitzer Prize for National Reporting, for a series on the American troops severely wounded in Iraq and Afghanistan. A birthright Quaker, Wood registered as a conscientious objector in 1963 and served two years of civilian service before becoming a journalist.

A graduate of Temple University, Wood was a correspondent for Time magazine in Chicago, Boston and Nairobi, where he covered guerrilla wars across Africa from 1977 to 1980.

He is the author of two books, including What Have We Done: The Moral Injury of our Longest Wars (Little, Brown & Co, 2016)

== Career ==
As a reporter in Washington he has covered presidential campaigns and the State Department for The Washington Star and national security issues for the Los Angeles Times, Newhouse News Service, The Baltimore Sun and AOL's Politics Daily before moving to HuffPost in February 2011 where he has covered national security issues at the White House, Pentagon, CIA and State Department, and has reported on conflict from Europe, Africa, Asia, the Middle East and Central America.

He accompanied U.S. military units in the field many times, both on domestic and overseas training maneuvers and in Desert Storm, the Iran–Iraq tanker war, the interventions in Panama, Somalia and Haiti, peacekeeping missions in the Balkans and combat operations in Afghanistan and Iraq.

In five trips to Afghanistan since January 2002, he has lived and worked with the 10th Mountain and 101st Airborne Divisions, the 1st Battalion, 6th Marines, the 82nd Airborne Division's special troops battalion, the 4th Brigade Combat Team, 25th Infantry, in RC-East and with the 10th Mountain Division's 1st Brigade in Kunduz, Faryab and Kandahar provinces.

In his HuffPost biography, he says, "I have been scared much of my professional life."

In 1992–1993, he spent a year with the 24th Marine Expeditionary Unit, including three months of ground operations in Somalia. His account of that experience, A Sense of Values, was published by Andrews & McMeel in 1994.

== Awards ==
Wood was awarded a Pulitzer Prize for National Reporting in 2012. He was also a Pulitzer Prize finalist in 1998. In 2012, Wood was the recipient of the Bayeux Calvados-Normandy Award for war correspondents, an international award for war reporting. Wood won the Gerald R. Ford Prize for Distinguished Defense Reporting and other national awards. He won the 2017 Dayton Literary Peace Prize, Non-Fiction winner for What Have We Done.

== In the media ==
He has appeared on CNN, C-SPAN, the PBS News Hour, NPR, WUSA and the BBC, and was a regular guest on MSNBC's Now With Alex Wagner. He has lectured at the U.S. Army Eisenhower Fellows Conference, the Marine Staff College, the Joint Forces Staff College and Temple University.

In 2013, his piece titled "Defense Budget Faces Cuts To Personnel After Decade Of War," about rising military personnel costs, caused a controversy and extended debate about whether military personnel and their families are justly compensated for their work.
