= List of George Polk Award winners =

Award winners for journalism

The George Polk Awards in Journalism are a series of American journalism awards presented annually by Long Island University in New York.

== Awards ==
Year	Category	Winner	Organization	Work
2025	Foreign Reporting	Abdi Latif Dahir; Justin Scheck; Vivian Nereim	The New York Times	“for "Why Maids Keep Dying in Saudi Arabia," groundbreaking investigative accounts, reported at considerable risk, revealing how well-placed individuals profited from the trafficking of East African women recruited for domestic work who were abused, stranded and often killed"
2025	International Reporting	Anna Maria Barry-Jester; Brett Murphy	ProPublica	"for stories exposing the cavalier approach officials took in deciding to dismantle the U.S. Agency for International Development and establishing the profoundly harmful impact the aid cutoff had on millions of people in need around the world"
2025	National Reporting	The New York Times	The New York Times	"for relentless and unflinching coverage of the White House "
2025	Local Reporting	Giulia McDonnell Nieto del Rio; Mark Arsenault	The Boston Globe	"for probing the case of Rümeysa Öztürk, a Turkish graduate student at Tufts University arrested by six masked agents in what her Somerville neighbors assumed was a kidnapping and held for six weeks in Louisiana"
2025	Justice Reporting	Jan Ransom	The New York Times	"for exposing the beating death of an inmate at the hands of New York prison guards, establishing the likelihood that three other inmates had met a similar fate and portraying a prison system so out of control that video evidence of inmate torture was ignored"
2025	Environmental Reporting	staff of Business Insider	Business Insider	"for "The True Cost of Data Centers""
2025	Health Reporting	Lizzy Lawrence	STAT	"for chronicling the degradation of the Food and Drug Administration as Americans' health care protector"
2025	Political Reporting	Andy Kroll	ProPublica	"for "The Shadow President""
2025	Magazine Reporting	Elliott Woods	Texas Monthly	"for "A Deadly Passage," the product of more than two years of exhaustive reporting to show how Latin American families were devastated by the deaths of 53 migrants in the back of a tractor trailer in South Texas"
2025	Immigration Reporting	Nick Miroff	The Atlantic	"for spotlighting an example of wrongful deportation that became a global cause célèbre"
2025	Photojournalism	Stephanie Keith; Abdel Kareem Hana; Jehad Alshrafi; Mariam Dagga	freelance, Associated Press	"for "The Trap at 26 Federal Plaza""
2025	National Television Reporting	Cecilia Vega; Camilo Montoya-Galvez; Andy Court; Annabelle Hanflig	60 Minutes	"for "The Prisoners," a segment putting the lie to assertions that most Venezuelans deported to the notorious Salvadorian CECOT prison were violent felons or known gang members"
2025	Foreign Television Reporting	Mstyslav Chernov; Alex Babenko	FRONTLINE FEATURES, The Associated Press	"for "2000 Meters to Andriivka," that brought home the harrowing nature of front-line warfare in Ukraine"
2025	Sydney H. Schanberg Prize	Jon Lee Anderson	The New Yorker	"for "Congo's Thirty-Year War," an article that highlights the complex historical and current forces driving a conflict that is spreading to neighboring countries and spawning scores of ethnic militias at an incalculable cost in human suffering"
2025	Career Award	Maria Hinojosa	Latino USA	"anchor and executive producer of Latino USA. a syndicated public radio show devoted to Latino issues, and founder of Futuro Media, an independent nonprofit newsroom"
2024	Foreign Reporting	Ronen Bergman; Mark Mazzetti	The New York Times	“for "The Unpunished: How Extremists Took Over Israel," chronicling how a half-century of condoning the terrorizing of West Bank Palestinians by ultranationalist settlers and their supporters became government policy"
2024	War Reporting	Declan Walsh staff of The New York Times	The New York Times	"for a series of dispatches from Sudan, reported at great personal risk, demonstrating how starvation, indiscriminate destruction and inhuman atrocities were deployed as tools of a civil war"
2024	National Reporting	Katherine Eban	Vanity Fair	"for revealing how political considerations that prioritized economic interests over public health concerns slowed the federal government's response to a bird flu outbreak, seemingly ignoring lessons of the Covid-19 pandemic"
2024	Local Reporting	Alissa Zhu; Nick Thieme; Jessica Gallagher	The Baltimore Banner	"for doggedly amassing data to establish that Baltimore was enduring the most lethal drug overdose crisis of any major city in American history with some surprising victims"
2024	State Reporting	Sara DiNatale	San Antonio Express-News	"for her four-part series exposing the deceptive practices of solar energy contractors who trained door-to-door scam artists to target elderly homeowners with false promises of energy savings that never materialized, rebates that didn't exist and tax credits for which they didn't qualify"
2024	Health Care Reporting	Bob Herman; Tara Bannow; Casey Ross; Lizzy Lawrence	STAT	"for "Health Care's Colossus," a penetrating six-part series examining the massive reach of UnitedHealth Group into every aspect of a broken health care system"
2024	Medical Reporting	Kavitha Surana; Lizzie Presser; Cassandra Jaramillo; Stacy Kranitz	ProPublica	"for mining hospital records and death certificates in Texas and other states that enacted stringent abortion bans in the aftermath of the 2022 U.S. Supreme Court Dobbs decision to uncover a tragic result: the preventable deaths of women denied routine treatment for pregnancy complications as new laws threatened physicians with prosecution"
2024	Political Reporting	Jane Mayer	The New Yorker	"for "Pete Hegseth's Secret History," which unearthed a record of financial mismanagement, sexual misconduct and repeated incidents of workplace intoxication that twice cost President Trump's nominee for Secretary of Defense leadership positions in advocacy groups he ran"
2024	Justice Reporting	Katey Rusch; Casey Smith	freelance	"for "Right to Remain Secret," a two-part series published by the San Francisco Chronicle. A product of five years of research, their stories detailed how dozens of police officers in California arranged to cleanse their records of damaging behavior and retire with lucrative pensions in secret deals that allowed their departments to avoid cumbersome dismissal proceedings"
2024	Technology Reporting	Olivia Carville; Cecilia D'Anastasio	Bloomberg Businessweek	"for stories about child safety online that revealed how predators have used the Roblox gaming platform to groom and exploit children, how "sextortion" scammers blackmailed teens via Instagram and how drug dealers sold fentanyl to kids using Snapchat"
2024	Magazine Reporting	Rachel Aviv	The New Yorker	"for "Alice Munro's Passive Voice.""
2024	National Television Reporting	Mike Hixenbaugh; Jon Schuppe; Liz Kreutz; Susan Carroll	NBC News, Noticias Telemundo	"for "Dealing the Dead," revealing that a medical school in north Texas was dismembering the corpses of individuals who died alone."
2024	Foreign Television Reporting	Marcia Biggs; Eric O'Connor; André Paultre	PBS NewsHour	"for their series "Haiti in Crisis," which depicted the complete breakdown of daily life in parts of Port Au Prince"
2024	Podcast	Ben Austen; Bill Healy	Audible	"for "The Parole Room," which followed the 20th effort to gain parole by Johnnie Veal"
2024	Sydney H. Schanberg Prize	Sarah A. Topol	The New York Times Magazine	"for "The Deserter," a view of the invasion of Ukraine through the eyes of a disillusioned Russian combat officer who defected with his wife and child, one of 18 deserters Topol interviewed in more than a year of reporting while keeping herself and her sources safe from Russian security services"
2023	Foreign Reporting	The New York Times	The New York Times	“for unsurpassed coverage of the war between Israel and Hamas"
2023	National Reporting	Joshua Kaplan; Justin Elliott; Alex Mierjeski; Brett Murphy staff of ProPublica	ProPublica	"for revealing secret, lavish and highly questionable gifts that U.S. Supreme Court Justice Clarence Thomas has received for decades from wealthy benefactors"
2023	Local Reporting	Jesse Coburn	StreetsBlog NYC	"for "Ghost Tags: Inside New York City's Black Market for Temporary License Plates," the product of a seven-month investigation that uncovered an extensive underground economy in fraudulent paper license plates that motorists used to evade detection while driving on suspended licenses, dodging tolls and tickets and committing other more serious crimes"
2023	State Reporting	Chris Osher; Julia Cardi	The Gazette of Colorado Springs	"for exposing the heartbreaking consequences of a family court system that relied on the advice of unqualified and incompetent parental evaluators to return young children to abusive fathers, leading to four deaths in a two-month period"
2023	Business Reporting	Staff of Reuters	Reuters	"for penetrating reports on nefarious practices at companies owned by multi-billionaire entrepreneur Elon Musk"
2023	Medical Reporting	Anna Werner; Brett Kelman; Fred Schulte; Holly K. Hacker; Daniel Chang	CBS News, KFF Health News	"for "When Medical Devices Malfunction," which reported on the failure of FDA-approved knee implants; hip implant failures that led to emergency surgery; faulty heart pumps; the recall of insulin pumps three years after an FDA official hailed them as technology that would "give patients greater freedom to live their lives," and (literally) jaw-dropping dental devices that totally escaped the agency's attention"
2023	Medical Reporting	Michael D. Sallah; Michael Korsh; Evan Robinson-Johnson; Debbie Cenziper	Pittsburgh Post-Gazette, ProPublica	"for "With Every Breath," a series exposing the scope of a corporate cover-up that allowed Philips Respironics to continue marketing breathing machines around the globe years after the FDA received warnings about contaminants in the machines and the company's own experts concluded that the devices posed severe health risks to users"
2023	Justice Reporting	Brian Howey	freelance	"exposé on a tawdry police practice was published by the Los Angeles Times and developed into a segment of a podcast by Reveal, The Center for Investigative Reporting"
2023	Magazine Reporting	Luke Mogelson	The New Yorker	"for "Two Weeks at the Front in Ukraine.""
2023	Photojournalism	Samar Abu Elouf; Yousef Masoud	The New York Times	"for chronicling Israel's bombardment and invasion of their homeland, Gaza"
2023	Podcast	Meribah Knight; Ken Armstrong; Daniel Guillemette	WPLN Nashville, ProPublica, The New York Times	"for a four-part Podcast, "The Kids of Rutherford County," which chronicled the shockingly misguided approach to juvenile discipline by a domineering judge in one Tennessee county"
2023	Television Reporting	Julia Steers; Amel Guettatfi	VICE News	"for "Inside Wagner," compelling on-the-ground coverage of Russian mercenaries on the Ukraine front and in the Central African Republic"
2023	Commentary	Masha Gessen	The New Yorker	"In the Shadow of the Holocaust," a deeply personal and highly nuanced examination of how Germany and other European nations equate opposition to Israeli policies with anti-Semitism"
2023	Sydney H. Schanberg Prize	Jason Motlagh	Rolling Stone	"for "This Will End in Blood and Ashes," a vivid account of the virtually complete collapse of order in Haiti"
2022	Foreign Reporting	The New York Times	The New York Times	“The Making of Vladimir Putin,” a 6,750-word opus by Paris bureau chief Roger Cohen, tracing Putin’s “22-year slide from statesman to tyrant,” and “Putin’s War,” the 13,000-word product of two-months of research replete with invasion maps, cell phone intercepts and diaries from Russian soldiers, exposed the vaunted Russian military as unprepared, ill equipped and badly managed
2022	War Reporting	Mstyslav Chernov; Evgeniy Maloletka; Vasilisa Stepanenko; Lori Hinnant	Associated Press	Narratives and images of the Siege of Mariupol
2022	National Reporting	Josh Gerstein; Alex Ward; Peter Canellos	Politico	Revealing Supreme Court Justice Samuel Alito’s draft opinion in Dobbs v. Jackson Women's Health Organization overturning Roe v. Wade
2022	Local Reporting	John Archibald; Ashley Remkus; Ramsey Archibald	AL.com	Revealing abusive policing in Brookside, Alabama
2022	State Reporting	Joshua Schneyer; Mica Rosenberg; Kristina Cooke	Reuters	Abusive employment of underage migrants in Hyundai auto parts factories and poultry slaughterhouses in Alabama
2022	Health Reporting	Kendall Taggart; John Templon; Anthony Cormier; Jason Leopold	BuzzFeed News	Decline in quality of care at group homes for people with disabilities operated by KKR
2022	Financial Reporting	Ian Allison; Tracy Wang	CoinDesk	Revealing the financial situation of FTX and Alameda Research, ultimately leading to the Bankruptcy of FTX
2022	Environmental Reporting	Terrence McCoy	Washington Post	Examination of the exploitation of natural resources in the Amazon rainforest
2022	Education Reporting	Eliza Shapiro; Brian M. Rosenthal	The New York Times	Inadequate quality of education at Hasidic yeshivas in New York City
2022	Justice Reporting	Brett Murphy	ProPublica	“Words of Conviction,” a report debunking 911 call analysis
2022	Political Reporting	Sarah Blaskey; Nicholas Nehamas; Ana Ceballos; Mary Ellen Klas	Miami Herald	Reporting on the Martha's Vineyard migrant airlift
2022	Foreign Television	Sharif Abdel Kouddous; Kavitha Chekuru; Laila Al-Arian	Al Jazeera English	Report on the killing of Shireen Abu Akleh
2022	National Television Reporting	Shimon Prokupecz	CNN	Reporting on the failed law enforcement response to the Robb Elementary School shooting
2022	Photojournalism	Lynsey Addario	The New York Times	Iconic photo of the bodies of a woman and her two children alongside a friend who lay dying moments after a mortar struck them as they sought to flee Ukraine
2022	Special Award	Theo Baker	The Stanford Daily	Reporting on significant flaws in research published by then-president of Stanford University, Marc Tessier-Lavigne
2022	Sydney H. Schanberg Prize	Alex Perry	Outside magazine	Account of a 2021 ISIS attack on the town of Palma, Mozambique
2021	Foreign Reporting	Maria Abi-Habib; Frances Robles	The New York Times	Award for "detailed accounts" attributing the assassination of Haitian president Jovenel Moïse to "a plot by drug traffickers likely concerned that the president might expose them." The reports "debunked official versions of events" and "exposed disturbing aspects of Moïse’s past."
2021	National Reporting		Washington Post	"The Attack," a three-part online series that "cited systematic security failures" in the lead-up to the attack on the United States Capitol, as well as documenting President Donald Trump's "incitement of the insurrectionists and refusal to heed pleas to intercede," examining "the continued growth of radical hate groups," and the "resumption of Republican efforts to promote baseless claims of 2020 election fraud."
2021	Local Reporting	Corey G. Johnson; Rebecca Woolington; Eli Murray	Tampa Bay Times	For reports ("funded in part by PBS' Frontline's Local Journalism Initiative") that exposed "unsafe conditions" at a lead-smelting factory; the conditions "endangered low-wage employees working with inadequate protection from the effects of lead dust and other toxic chemicals."
2021	State Reporting	Carol Marbin Miller; Daniel Chang	Miami Herald in partnership with ProPublica	"Birth & Betrayal," a series of reports exposing the consequence of a 1988 law designed to shelter medical providers from lawsuits by funding lifelong care for children severely disabled by birth-related brain injuries, and how an agency responsible for "stewarding" nearly $1.7 billion in funds "repeatedly refused pleas for care."
2021	International Reporting	Ian Urbina	The New Yorker in collaboration with The Outlaw Ocean Project	Award for an article revealing that "the European Union equipped and trained Libyans to intercept migrants from sub-Saharan Africa at sea and hold them in secret prisons." During their reporting, Urbina and his team were seized, detained, beaten, and interrogated by Libyan agents at a "black site" for 6 days.
2021	Medical Reporting	Adam Feuerstein; Matthew Herper; Damian Garde	STAT	Reports revealing "covert lobbying" of the Food and Drug Administration by Biogen, which led to the FDA overruling its own scientific advisors "to grant approval for Biogen's new and costly treatment for Alzheimer's disease despite questionable trial results."
2021	Business Reporting	Jeff Horwitz	The Wall Street Journal	"The Facebook Files," a series that exposed how the social media company and its top executives "ignored internal findings" and rejected fixes to company practices promoted extremism and divisiness, endangered teenage girls to negative discussions of body image and emotional health, and protected drug cartels — all out of fears that "political friction" and profitability would decrease were those fixed put into place.
2021	Environmental Reporting	David Muir; Almin Karamehmedovic; Esther Castillejo	ABC News	Award for "The Children of Climate Change," a series airing on World News Tonight and Nightline that showed "how global warming led to a famine devastating a remote, drought-stricken region of Madagascar."
2021	Magazine Reporting	Sarah Stillman	The New Yorker	Award for “The Migrant Workers Who Follow Climate Disasters,” which explored how federal contractors benefitted from "the multi-billion-dollar disaster recovery industry" while putting the lives their employees, many of whom are undocumented immigrants or foreign guest workers, at risk.
2021	Military Reporting	Azmat Kahn; Dave Phillips; Eric Schmitt	The New York Times	Award for exposing "a record of deadly errors" that led to "intelligence failures and civilian deaths associated with Middle East air strikes."
2021	Political Reporting	Linda So; Jason Szep	Reuters	Award for reports uncovering "widespread intimidation efforts by acolytes of Donald Trump to undermine the electoral process by threatening and vilifying poll workers and government officials in 16 states," and how those aggrieved by such false narratives made threats against election officials (and were prosecuted for doing so).
2021	Technology Reporting		Forbidden Stories Network; Washington Post; The Guardian	Award for "The Pegasus Project," reporting that revealed how spywear sold by NSO Group was used to tap into the phones of business executives, human rights activists, journalists, and politicians.
2021	Local Television Reporting	Dave Biscobing	KNXV-TV/Phoenix, AZ	"Politically Charged", a series of reports that revealed how police and prosecutors fabricated, yet testified as real, the existence of a street gang "in order to convince a grand jury to authorize surveillance of political protestors."
2021	National Television Reporting	A. C. Thompson	ProPublica; PBS Frontline; Berkeley Investigative Reporting Program	Award for "American Insurrection," which examined the emboldening of far-right extremist activity across the United States.
2021	Foreign Television Reporting	Clarissa Ward	CNN	Award for "real-time coverage" of the "rapid rise" of Taliban forces as U.S. Troops withdrew from Afghanistan.
2020	Foreign Reporting	David Culver Yong Xiong Natalie Thomas	CNN	"for giving much of the world its first on-the-scene look at the dangers posed by the coronavirus and the Chinese efforts to control its spread. Tapping into independent sources they developed during a trip to Wuhan that was cut short when the government ordered a lockdown of the city, the CNN crew did much of its early reporting from an enforced 14-day quarantine site."
2020	Science Reporting	Ed Yong	The Atlantic	"for his clear and insightful analysis of factors behind the spread of COVID-19 and failed efforts to bring it under control. Yong’s March 25 account, “How the Pandemic Will End,” correctly predicted its inordinately severe impact in the U.S., a circumstance his August 4 story, “How the Pandemic Defeated America,” explained in devastating detail."
2020	Medical Reporting	Dan Diamond	Politico	"for multiple accounts of Trump Administration interference with the Centers for Disease Control and other sources of medical and scientific expertise. Among the actions he revealed were efforts to reduce COVID-19 testing, pour $300 million into a celebrity ad campaign, send seniors $200 drug discount cards, ignore a “pandemic playbook” inherited from the Obama Administration and install a spokesman at the Department of Health and Human Services with orders to withhold or revise reports that did not hew to the official line."
2020	Public Service Award	Helen Branswell	Stat	"for relentless coverage of all aspects of the pandemic that became must reading for the medical community and the general public. From her first posting January 4 alerting readers to a “growing cluster of unexplained pneumonia cases” in Wuhan to her December 31 take on experts’ frustration over how little they knew about a new variant of the virus, Branswell tracked the spread of the virus in 161 articles — more than three a week —that were almost uniformly timely and astute."
2020	Health Reporting	Staff of ProPublica	ProPublica	"for two series examining the pandemic’s disproportionate impact on Black Americans and meatpacking workers. Using data and anecdotal evidence, a team of reporters revealed high rates of infection in Black communities because of limited access to proper medical care. In another series, reporters Michael Grabell and Bernice Yeung found global corporations exposed low-wage food handlers to conditions that caused widespread Covid-19 outbreaks, even lobbying the federal government to declare them essential workers."
2020	Oral History	Eli Saslow	The Washington Post	"for “Voices from the Pandemic,” 25 compelling personal narratives he crafted based on extensive interviews with individuals deeply affected by the virus. Saslow chose each to represent a segment of the American populace coping with grief, fear, guilt, bitterness, frustration, tension, dejection and other emotions, relating their stories in their own words while keeping his role invisible to the reader."
2020	Military Reporting	Matthias Gafni Joe Garofoli Tal Kopan	San Francisco Chronicle	"for disclosing the Pentagon’s punishment of Navy Captain Brett Crozier who sought to evacuate nearly 5,000 sailors in tight quarters aboard the USS Theodore Roosevelt to protect them from exposure to Covid-19. The Chronicle story forced the Acting Navy Secretary to resign and called into question the military’s approach to the pandemic. In the end a crewmember died and a thousand others tested positive for the virus, including Crozier, who lost his command, was almost reinstated and finally lost it for good."
2020	Magazine Reporting	Katie Engelhart	The California Sunday Magazine	"for “What Happened in Room 10?”. Focusing on one room in the Life Care Center of Kirkland, Washington, scene of the nation's first deadly COVID-19 outbreak, which led to 46 deaths, Engelhart's seamless 17,000-word narrative was at once riveting storytelling and a deft analysis of what went so wrong in nursing homes across the country."
2020	National Reporting	Luke Mogelson	The New Yorker	"for three magazine articles putting his extensive experience as a foreign war correspondent to use with firsthand accounts of domestic upheaval that sometimes turned violent. He produced probing portraits of Black Lives Matter activists in Minneapolis, anti-lockdown militia members in Michigan and competing left and right militants on the streets of Portland."
2020	Local Reporting	Staff of the Star Tribune	Star Tribune	"for coverage of the death of George Floyd and its aftermath, starting with spot-on deadline work by police reporter Libor Jany and then delving into the background on Floyd and the officers indicted for killing him. Other articles explored the unsavory history of a precinct, destroyed by protestors, that was considered a breeding ground for renegade cops. The articles portrayed an ineffective police disciplinary process and reported on attempts to rethink the role of police and pick up the pieces in neighborhoods ravaged in the protests."
2020	Justice Reporting	Staff of The Washington Post	The Washington Post	"'George Floyd’s America,' a six-part series by a team of Washington Post reporters illustrating how uncanny a match Floyd’s life and death were for the national movement he came to symbolize, has won the award for Justice Reporting. Based on more than 150 interviews, the Post series detailed how entrenched poverty, structural racism, inferior education, police intimidation and a rigged criminal justice system dogged Floyd’s life from beginning to end."
2020	Television Reporting	Roberto Ferdman	VICE News	"for breakthrough coverage of the shooting death of 26-year-old Breonna Taylor in a “no-knock” police raid in Louisville and the investigations that followed. Their reports revealed a pattern of over-heavy police enforcement amid a culture that condoned misconduct and called into question official accounts of the raid and ensuing probes, including a highly suspect grand jury investigation."
2020	Political Reporting	Stephanie McCrummen	The Washington Post	for deftly capturing Georgia’s shifting political winds in three perceptive profiles in the run- up to the election. One highlighted the conversion of a suburban woman whose turn away from President Trump presaged his ultimate defeat. Another portrayed the re-election of a 76-year-old Democrat-turned-Republican sheriff as a reflection of resistance to change in the rural South. And the third chronicled the collapse of a Democratic Congressional campaign against a far-right conspiratorialist whose outlandish views would soon make her a pariah for many colleagues on Capitol Hill.
2020	Business Reporting	Ryan Mac Craig Silverman	BuzzFeed News	"for a series demonstrating how Facebook exposes the public to disinformation, fraud and violence. They found the $800 billion social media giant was slow to remove extremist content, fired a whistleblower who determined it favored right-wing publishers and disregarded another who detailed how fake accounts were undermining the democratic process in India, Ukraine, Spain, Brazil, Bolivia and Ecuador as well as the U.S. In one egregious example, Mac and Silverman revealed that Facebook ignored 455 requests to remove an event page urging militants to bring weapons to a Wisconsin protest where two people were later shot to death."
2020	Financial Reporting	Ross Buettner Susanne Craig Mike McIntire	The New York Times	"for accessing and analyzing a trove of Donald Trump’s income tax information, a reportorial coup suggesting why Trump went to such lengths to hide it from public view. They reported that in 11 years before 2017, he paid no federal income tax, benefitting from such questionable write-offs as $70,000 for hair care, over $2 million in property taxes on a family retreat and almost $800,000 in “consulting fees” paid to his daughter. Perhaps their most stinging revelation was the amount Trump remitted in each of two years he did pay tax: $750."
2020	Local Reporting	Ian Shapira	The Washington Post	for laying bare overt racism at the state-supported Virginia Military Institute. Among other things, he persuaded aggrieved Black cadets to open up about their experiences at the hands of whites. His series of articles led Governor Ralph Northam (an alumnus) to order an independent investigation. They pressured VMI’s board to remove a statue of Confederate general Stonewall Jackson and forced the resignation of VMI’s superintendent, who was succeeded by the first Black to lead the 181- year-old institute.
2020	Education Reporting	Robert Lee Tristan Ahtone	High Country News	"for 'Land Grab Universities,' the result of a two- year investigation exploring the dark side of a federal initiative considered a hallmark achievement, the 1862 Morrill Act. The law transferred nearly 11 million acres to the states to fund the establishment of 52 land grant colleges. Nearly all that acreage, now worth an estimated half-billion dollars, was seized from 250 Indigenous nations, the magazine found. Its well-documented account sent shockwaves through campuses across the country where students and faculty demanded that institutions like MIT, Cornell and Cal-Berkeley find ways to right a 150- year-old wrong."
2020	Special Award	Regina Martínez Pérez	Proceso Forbidden Stories	Eight years after the 2012 murder of Martinez, journalists following her leads produced “The Cartel Project,” which linked politicians to drug traffickers in the state of Veracruz and discovered that she had been preparing to publish an explosive report about thousands of individuals who had mysteriously disappeared. Forbidden Stories reporters interviewed sources who had never spoken on-the-record, revealing how local authorities sabotaged the investigation into Martinez's death and put a scapegoat behind bars without proof — a tactic similar to one used by the Greek government in the aftermath of George Polk’s murder.
2019	Foreign reporting	Azam Ahmed	The New York Times	"for risking his safety time and again to portray the reality and impact of violence perpetrated by gangs, drug cartels and even police in firsthand dispatches from Brazil, Jamaica, Honduras, Guatemala and Mexico, where he is stationed as the Times Bureau Chief."
2019	National reporting	Lomi Kriel	Houston Chronicle	"for revealing previously unreported aspects of the Trump Administration's immigration policy and tactics that extracted a heavy and sometimes lethal toll on Latin American refugees, including the continued separation of some families without apparent reason."
2019	Metropolitan reporting	Staff of Newsday	Newsday	"for Long Island Divided, a series three years in the making that exposed an endemic pattern of discrimination by suburban realtors steering homebuyers of color away from white enclaves in violation of federal and state law. It drew promises of action from officials at every level of government."
2019	Local reporting	Brian M. Rosenthal	The New York Times	"for unearthing a pernicious scheme by unscrupulous lenders to drive up the price of taxi medallions and turn huge profits by selling them to unsophisticated cab drivers with loans they could never repay, leading borrowers into financial ruin so devastating at least nine committed suicide."
2019	International reporting	Mark Scheffler and Malachy Browne and the Visual Investigations Team	The New York Times	"for using local plane spottings, satellite imagery, cockpit recordings, and Google Earth tools to map and geolocate the attacks to establish that Russian pilots in Syria bombed four hospitals, a busy commercial street, and a refugee camp, killing scores of civilians. It was one of a number of wide-ranging coups the team pulled off combining advanced technology with ground-level reporting in Venezuela, Afghanistan, Libya, North Korea and Hong Kong."
2019	Financial reporting	Noah Buhayar and Caleb Melby and David Kocieniewski	Bloomberg News	"for groundbreaking stories on how wealthy, well-connected individuals perverted the stated intention of "opportunity zone" incentives in the 2017 federal tax code for their own profit. The program was aimed at spurring economic growth in depressed areas, but some developers reaped tax breaks by using it for such high-end projects as a long-planned $4 billion luxury North Miami development and the construction of a Ritz-Carlton hotel in downtown Portland, Oregon."
2019	Business reporting	Dominic Gates and Mike Baker and Steve Militech and Lewis Kamb	The Seattle Times	"for first exposing the cooperative arrangements between Boeing and the Federal Aviation Administration that led to the approval of design changes in 737 Max jets blamed for two crashes, killing 346. Times reporters traced FAA approval of the flawed flight control system to its decision to defer to Boeing's own safety analysis, which they attributed to pressure from leaders of the company and the agency to speed production and avoid adding costs."
2019	Environmental reporting	Helena Bottemiller Evich	Politico	"for describing how a politicized Department of Agriculture ignored its own climate action plan, devoted a minuscule portion of its budget to climate change, which it acknowledges is the gravest threat to food production, and buried a study warning of lost nutrients in rice, the leading source of nutrition for 600 million people, provoking a highly regarded scientist to quit in disgust."
2019	Military reporting	Craig Whitlock	The Washington Post	"forcing the release of interviews conducted about the Afghan War as part of a five-year, $11 million federal Lessons Learned project. After Whitlock received more than 2,000 documents, including some initially withheld, he puzzled out key redactions before producing "The Afghanistan Papers," which demonstrated that "senior U.S. officials failed to tell the truth about the war in Afghanistan throughout the 18-year campaign, making rosy pronouncements they knew to be false and hiding unmistakable evidence the war had become unwinnable.""
2019	Justice reporting	Lisa Gartner	The Philadelphia Inquirer	"for Beaten, Not Silenced, which exposed a pattern of violent physical abuse of boys housed at the Glen Mills Schools, a 193-year-old reformatory in suburban Delaware County. Gartner's reporting was so devastating that within days state officials ordered Glen Mills closed and pledged to do a better job of monitoring conditions at juvenile justice facilities across Pennsylvania."
2019	Political reporting	Chance Swaim and Jonathan Shorman and Dion Lefler	The Wichita Eagle	"for turning journalistic intuition into deep dives into public records that revealed municipal misconduct."
2019	Political reporting	Luke Broadwater and staff	The Baltimore Sun	"for turning journalistic intuition into deep dives into public records that revealed municipal misconduct."
2019	Magazine reporting	Lizzie Presser	ProPublica and The New Yorker	"for The Dispossessed, an account of how speculators use legal loopholes associated with "heirs' property" laws in the South to seize black-owned ancestral lands, uprooting lifelong residents who assume their homes and property have been passed down to them. Especially poignant was Presser's portrait of two brothers in a North Carolina coastal town jailed for nearly eight years for refusing to leave."
2019	Television reporting	John Sudworth	BBC News	"for Inside China's Hidden Camps, which documented the reality of camps authorities established in Xinjiang province to indoctrinate hundreds of thousands of Muslims in an effort to erase their religion and culture. Allowed by authorities to visit one camp depicted as a model of agreeability, Sudworth used satellite photos, leaked documents and interviews with forlorn parents separated from their children to paint a very different picture."
2019	Special Award	Nikole Hannah-Jones and contributors	The New York Times	"for The 1619 Project, a supplement published on the 400th anniversary of the advent of American slavery, using essays by journalists and scholars to explore the role of slavery in history and its enduring effects in contemporary American society. A powerful introduction by Hannah-Jones, the project's creator and driving force, examined efforts of black Americans to advance the nation's expressed ideals of democracy, liberty and equality in the face of centuries of oppression and exclusion."
2018	Special Award	David Ignatius and Karen Attiah	The Washington Post	"for eloquence and resolve in demanding accountability in the wake of the gruesome murder of Post columnist Jamal Khashoggi"
2018	Special Award	Madeleine Baran and Samara Freemark	APM Reports	"for 'In the Dark: Season Two,' a compelling case for the innocence of a death-row inmate tried and convicted six times for a quadruple murder in 1996."
2018	Local Television Reporting Award	Joe Bruno	WSOC-TV in Charlotte, N.C.	"for stories on ballot tampering in a rural North Carolina Congressional race."
2018	Foreign Television Reporting Award	Jane Ferguson	PBS NewsHour	"for her graphic portrayal of a humanitarian disaster resulting from the proxy war between forces allied with Saudi Arabia and Iran in northern Yemen."
2018	Magazine Reporting Award	Ben Taub	The New Yorker	"for a firsthand account of 'Iraq’s Post-ISIS Campaign of Revenge' by minority Sunnis against Shiites in sham trials sometimes leading to summary executions."
2018	Environmental Reporting Award	Larry C. Price, reporters for Undark Magazine	Undark Magazine	"for “Breathtaking,” a global examination of the sources and effects of deadly particulate pollutants."
2018	Education Reporting	Craig Harris, Anne Ryman, Alden Woods and Justin Price	The Arizona Republics	"no-bid contracts and political chicanery that provided windfall profits for investors in a number of prominent Arizona charter schools"
2018	Immigration Reporting Award	staff of ProPublica	ProPublica	"for “Zero Tolerance,” exposing the separation of young children from families as a tactic to deter border crossings and uncovering harsh conditions in federal shelters."
2018	Justice Reporting Award	Julie K. Brown	Miami Herald	for “Perversion of Justice,” exposing how a federal prosecutor helped a hedge-fund billionaire evade punishment for sexually abusing dozens of under-age girls.
2018	Medical Reporting Award	Kirby Dick, Amy Ziering and Amy Herdy	Netflix	for “The Bleeding Edge,” a documentary aired by Netflix linking the failure of risk-prone medical devices to lax regulation.
2018	Political Reporting Award	David Barstow, Susanne Craig and Russ Buettner	The New York Times	"for tracing President Donald Trump’s wealth to an inherited fortune and 'dubious tax schemes.'"
2018	Local Reporting Award	Kathleen McGrory and Neil Bedi	Tampa Bay Times	for “Heartbroken,” a series on deadly missteps at a children's hospital.
2018	State Reporting Award	Jeff Adelson, Gordon Russell, John Simerman	The Advocate of New Orleans	"for a series spurring elimination of split jury verdicts that victimized black defendants"
2018	National Reporting Award	staff of The New York Times	New York Times	" for demonstrating how social media giants promulgated hatemongering and misinformation to maximize profits"
2018	Foreign Reporting Award	Wa Lone and Kyaw Soe Oo	Reuters	for “Massacre in Myanmar,” exposing the execution of 10 Rohingya Muslims in a remote village.
2018	Career Award	Bill Siemering	NPR	
2017	Special Award	staff	The New York Times and The Washington Post	" uncovering connections between Trump campaign officials and well-connected Russians "
2017	Foreign Reporting Award	Iona Craig	The Intercept	"documenting the destruction and civilian casualties of a covert U.S. Navy SEAL raid upon a remote village in Yemen"
2017	National Reporting Award	Jodi Kantor and Megan Twohey & Ronan Farrow	The New York Times and The New Yorker	"exposing the decades-long sexual predation of the movie producer Harvey Weinstein and the campaign to cover it up"
2017	Local Reporting Award	Melissa Segura	BuzzFeed	"drawing attention to innocent men framed for murder by a Chicago police detective"
2017	Immigration Reporting Award	Maria Perez	The Naples Daily News	"exposing the practice of Florida companies hiring undocumented workers in dangerous jobs"
2017	Immigration Reporting Award	Antonia Farzan and Joseph Flaherty	Phoenix New Times	"revealing that Motel 6 motels in Phoenix, Arizona, provided nightly guest rosters to ICE"
2017	Financial Reporting Award	The International Consortium of Investigative Journalists		"mining a trove of 13.4 million records to reveal how corporate giants and prominent wealthy individuals use financial manipulations to evade taxes."
2017	Medical Reporting Award	Nina Martin & Renee Montagne	ProPublica & NPR	"explaining the reasons and portraying the tragedies behind an alarming increase in maternal deaths"
2017	Political Reporting Award	Stephanie McCrummen and Beth Reinhard	The Washington Post	"digging into the past of U.S. Senate candidate Roy Moore of Alabama "
2017	Magazine Reporting Award	Ben Taub	The New Yorker	"for showing the humanitarian devastation caused by the shrinkage of Lake Chad in Africa"
2017	Photography Award	Adam Dean and Tomas Munita	The New York Times	"capturing the plight of the Rohingya people desperately fleeing burning villages"
2017	National Television Reporting Award	Elle Reeve	VICE News	"on-the-scene up-close coverage of the protests in Charlottesville, Virginia"
2017	Foreign Television Reporting Award	Nima Elbagir and Raja Razek	CNN	"uncovering a hidden modern-day slave auction of African refugees in Libya."
2017	Public Service Award	David Begnaud	CBS News	"capturing the destructive power Hurricane Maria unleashed on Puerto Rico"
2017	Commentary Award	Gail Collins	The New York Times	
2016	George Polk Career Award	Anna Deavere Smith		
2016	Foreign Reporting	Nicholas Casey and Meridith Kohut	The New York Times	"for defying government resistance to portray the depths of privation result from Venezuela’s economic collapse."
2016	Political Reporting	David Fahrenthold	The Washington Post	"for a string of stories on matters Presidential candidate Donald Trump had long sought to keep secret, including his foundation’s deceptive activities and the existence of a video in which he bragged about sexually assaulting women."
2016	National Reporting	Alec MacGillis	ProPublica	"for prescient dispatches late in the Presidential campaign citing momentum for Donald Trump"
2016	Local Reporting	Darwin Bond Graham and Ali Winston	East Bay Express	"for exposing a sordid sex scandal inside the Oakland police department involving a teen-aged prostitute that led up the ranks and cost three police chiefs their jobs in a single week."
2016	Financial Reporting		The International Consortium of Investigative Journalists	"for 'the Panama Papers,' using leaked files to expose billions in hidden investments in offshore companies tied to Syria’s air war, the looting of Africa’s natural resources and Russian associates of Vladimir Putin"
2016	Medical Reporting	Lenny Bernstein, Scott Higham and David Fallis	The Washington Post	"for tracing the DEA’s lax regulation of narcotic painkillers despite a deadly national addiction epidemic to drug industry pressure."
2016	State Reporting	Craig Harris	The Arizona Republic	"for exposing the wholesale termination of women, minority and older state employees, including an award-winning teacher diagnosed with cancer and an African-American correctional officer injured on he job who were both reinstated."
2016	Justice Reporting	Christie Thompson and Joseph Shapiro	The Marshall Project, National Public Radio	"for revealing an oxymoronic abuse of prison inmates in double solitary confinement – sometimes resulting in violence and death."
2016	Sports Reporting	Rebecca R. Ruiz	The New York Times	"for an account of a Russian state-run doping program to enhance the performances of Olympic athletes and evade detection by secretly substituting test samples."
2016	Education Reporting	Brian M. Rosenthal	The Houston Chronicle	"for exposing a statewide quota denying special education services for more than 8.5 percent of students in any of the 1,200 school districts in Texas."
2016	Radio Reporting	Robert Lewis	WNYC	"for questioning New York City’s lax oversight of conflicts of interest among police leading to inappropriate dealings such as a commander’s purchase of discounted property from a distraught woman whose father’s disappearance was under investigation."
2016	Television Reporting	A. J. Lagoe, Steve Eckert, and Gary Knox	KARE-11	"a series disclosing that the VA deployed unqualified diagnosticians, some not even physicians, to diagnose veterans for traumatic brain injuries."
2016	Magazine Reporting	Anand Gopal	The Atlantic	"a wrenching 9,000-word account of the travails of an Iraqi family caught in the crossfire between Islamic State terrorists and U.S.-backed forces."
2016	Photojournalism	Daniel Berehulak	The New York Times	"depicting the wanton carnage of President Rodrigo Duterte’s murderous drug crackdown in the Philippines."
2016	Documentary Film	Nanfu Wang		Hooligan Sparrow
2015	George Polk Career Award	Simeon Booker	Jet	
2015	National Reporting	The Washington Post	The Washington Post	"for a series tallying and categorizing Americans shot dead by police over the course of a year"
2015	Military Reporting	Nicholas Kulish, Christopher Drew, Matthew Rosenberg, Mark Mazzetti, Serge Kovaleski. John Ismay, Sean Naylor	New York Times	"for examining allegations that daring Navy SEAL teams operated with little oversight and often used excessive force."
2015	Foreign Reporting	Ian Urbina	New York Times	"for 'The Outlaw Ocean,' a series on lawlessness on the high seas."
2015	Foreign Reporting	Margie Mason, Robin McDowell, Martha Mendoza, Esther Htusan	The Associated Press	"for 'Seafood Slaves,' on abysmal treatment of seafood workers in Thailand, some held against their will and others buried in unmarked graves"
2015	Justice Reporting	Ken Armstrong and T. Christian Miller	The Marshall Project and ProPublica	for 'An Unbelievable Story of Rape,' vindicating a teenaged rape victim initially charged with filing a false report of the crime."
2015	Medical Reporting	Jason Cherkis	The Huffington Post	"for revealing that pressure from 12-step programs barred many publicly funded addiction treatment centers from prescribing effective medication-assisted therapy."
2015	Radio Reporting	Nikole Hannah-Jones	This American Life	"for 'The Problem We All Live With' aired on “This American Life” examining how parents and politicians contrived to re-segregate a Missouri public school and its impact."
2015	Financial Reporting	John Carreyrou	The Wall Street Journal	"for stories cast doubt on innovative claims by a Silicon Valley blood-testing company."
2015	Legal Reporting	Jessica Silver-Greenberg, Michael Corkery, and Robert Gebeloff	New York Times	"for “Beware the Fine Print,” a series on how arbitration clauses deprive people of their right to settle disputes in court."
2015	Regional Reporting	Terrence McCoy	The Washington Post	"for exposing companies in Maryland and Virginia that convinced unsophisticated victims to accept pennies on the dollar for court-ordered compensation."
2015	Education Reporting	Cara Fitzpatrick, Lisa Gartner, and Michael LaForgia	The Tampa Bay Times	"for tracing a decline in black student success to a 2007 school board decision effectively re-segregating schools."
2015	Photography	Andrew Quilty	Foreign Policy	for 'The Man on the Operating Table,' depicting the devastating effects of an errant U.S. airstrike on a Doctors Without Borders hospital in Kunduz, Afghanistan."
2015	Magazine Reporting	Noreen Malone, Jen Kirby and Amanda Demme	New York Magazine	"for 'Cosby: The Women, An Unwelcome Sisterhood,' a cover story presenting on-the-record accounts of 35 women accusing Bill Cosby of sexual assault."
2015	Local Reporting	Jamie Kalven	Invisible Institute	"for 'Sixteen Shots,' an account published inline by Slate that contradicted the official narrative of the fatal police shooting of a black teenager in Chicago."
2015	Television Reporting	Jim Axelrod, Emily Rand	CBS News	"for 'Compounding Pharmacy Fraud,' revealing how some pharmacies billed insurers for worthless potions and supplements."
2015	Documentary Film	Matthew Heineman and Tom Yellin		"Cartel Land"
2014	International Reporting	Rukmini Callimachi	New York Times	"for revealing that European nations secretly paid the Islamic State millions of dollars to ransom hostages."
2014	Documentary Film	Orwa Nyrabia	Proaction Film	
2014	Foreign Reporting	Rania Abouzeid	Politico magazine	for “The Jihad Next Door,” an authoritative account of the rise of the Islamic State published online by Politico Magazine.
2014	Health Reporting	Adam Nossiter, Norimitsu Onishi, Ben C. Solomon, Sheri Fink, Helene Cooper, and Daniel Berehulak	New York Times	"for early coverage of the Ebola epidemic in West Africa."
2014	National Reporting	Carol Leonnig	Washington Post	"for series of exclusive reports on serious security lapses and misconduct by the U.S. Secret Service, which filed false and incomplete accounts of the missteps."
2014	Local Reporting	Tim Novak, Chris Fusco, and Carol Marin	Chicago Sun-Times	"for reports leading police to reopen a 10-year-old homicide case involving a nephew of former mayor Richard M. Daley."
2014	Business Reporting	A consortium of 120 journalists from 58 countries and 42 news organizations	International Consortium of Investigative Journalists	"for showing inventive methods big companies and wealthy individuals use to avoid paying taxes."
2014	Environmental Reporting		Seattle Times	"for linking a mudslide that cost 43 lives to corners cut, safeguards disregarded and warnings ignored."
2014	Justice Reporting	Julie K. Brown; Michael Schwirtz and Michael Winerip	Miami Herald; New York Times	"for revealing rampant brutalizing of mentally impaired inmates that caused injury and death."
2014	Magazine Reporting	James Verini	National Geographic	"for an 11,000-word report on the Democratic Republic of the Congo that asked, 'Should the United Nations Wage War to Keep Peace?'"
2014	Military Reporting	Denis Wagner	Arizona Republic	"for disclosing that VA officials in Phoenix and elsewhere won bonuses based on false wait-time data for treatment of veterans, some of whom died awaiting care."
2014	State Reporting	Doug Pardue, Glenn Smith, Jennifer Berry Hawes and Natalie Caula Hauff	Post and Courier (Charleston, S.C.)	"for linking 300 deaths of women in South Carolina to the indifferent response to domestic abuse by authorities."
2014	Television Reporting	John Carlos Frey, Marisa Venegas, Solly Granatstein	The Investigative Fund, Telemundo, The Weather Channel	"for “Dying to Cross,” on the deaths of 400 migrants abandoned in the Texas desert"
2014	Commentary	Ta-Nehisi Coates	The Atlantic	"The Case for Reparations"
2014	Career Award	Garry Trudeau	Doonesbury	
2013	National Security Reporting	Glenn Greenwald, Ewen MacAskill, Laura Poitras	The Guardian	"for investigative stories on massive NSA surveillance based on top-secret documents disclosed by former intelligence analyst Edward Snowden."
2013	National Security Reporting	Barton D. Gellman	Washington Post	"for investigative stories on massive NSA surveillance based on top-secret documents disclosed by former intelligence analyst Edward Snowden."
2013	Foreign Reporting	Jim Yardley	New York Times	"for documenting Bangladesh workers’ unsafe conditions and paltry wages at the hands of garment manufacturers with political ties in the aftermath of the Rana Plaza collapse, which claimed more than 1,100 lives. "
2013	National Reporting	Eli Saslow	Washington Post	"for profiling six of the families receiving federal nutrition assistance in a $78 billion program serving 47 million recipients in a program that tripled in scope in a decade."
2013	State Reporting	Shawn Boburg	The Record	"for articles linking a huge traffic jam created by lane closures on an approach to the George Washington Bridge to retribution by Governor Chris Christie’s campaign operatives against a mayor who failed to endorse his reelection."
2013	Local Reporting	Andrea Elliott	New York Times	for “Invisible Child,” a five-part series about one of New York City's 22,000 homeless children.
2013	Justice Reporting	Frances Robles, Sharon Otterman, Michael Powell and N. R. Kleinfield	New York Times	"for uncovering evidence that a Brooklyn homicide detective used false confessions, tainted testimony and coercive tactics to convict dozens of defendants."
2013	Sports Reporting	Tim Elfrink	Miami New Times	"for revealing that some of baseball’s biggest stars received banned performance enhancers from a Florida anti-aging clinic."
2013	Medical Reporting	Meg Kissinger	Milwaukee Journal Sentinel	for a series on the Milwaukee County’s dysfunctional mental health system
2013	Medical Reporting	Cynthia Hubert Phillip Reese	Sacramento Bee	"for exposing a Las Vegas psychiatric hospital’s practice of exporting patients — 1,500 over five years — to locales across the country via Greyhound bus."
2013	Magazine Reporting	Matthieu Aikins	Rolling Stone	for 'The A-Team Killings,' which made a strong case that a U.S. Army Special Forces unit had executed 10 civilians outside a base in Afghanistan
2013	Political Reporting	Rosalind S. Helderman Laura Vozzella Carol Leonnig	The Washington Post	"for revealing that the Virginia governor and his wife received $165,000 in loans and gifts from an entrepreneur.
	Business Reporting	Alison Fitzgerald Daniel Wagner Lauren Kyger John Dunbar	Center for Public Integrity	"for 'After the Meltdown,' a series demonstrating that the federal government failed to call any major Wall Street figure to account for the 2008 financial crisis and many had resumed the sort of reckless investing that led to the Great Recession."
	Television Reporting	Michael Kirk Jim Gilmore Mike Wiser Steve Fainaru Mark Fainaru-Wada	PBS Frontline	"for 'League of Denial,' tracing longstanding NFL efforts to quash evidence linking head injuries to high instances of chronic traumatic encephalopathy in former players."
	Local Television Reporting	Noah Pranksy	WTSP	"for disclosing how government officials and a contractor bilked drivers in Florida out of millions in fines by shortening yellow lights at intersections."
2012	Political Reporting	David Corn	Mother Jones	"for obtaining a recording of presidential candidate Mitt Romney confiding that 47 percent of voters 'dependent upon government' would oppose him 'no matter what.'"
2012	Foreign Reporting	David Barboza	New York Times	"for 'The Princelings,' tracing a $2.7 billion fortune accumulated by Prime Minister Wen Jiabao’s family."
2012	Foreign Reporting	Staff of Bloomberg News	Bloomberg News	"for 'China Betrayed,' on the wealth of a municipal official ousted after the murder of a British businessman
2012	Television News Reporting	Holly Williams Andrew Portch	CBS News	"for coverage of Chinese human rights activist Chen Guangcheng, who fled to the West after years of house arrest."
2012	War Reporting	David Enders Austin Tice McClatchy Newspaper "Inside Syria" Correspondent Team	McClatchy Newspapers	"for chronicling the complexities of the civil war in Syria."
2012	Video Reporting	Tracey Shelton	GlobalPost	"for reports on the Syrian war’s human toll including one on a 4-year sole survivor of an entire family."
2012	National Reporting	John Hechinger Janet Lorin	Bloomberg News	"for 'Indentured Students,' a series revealing that the U.S. paid $1 billion in commissions to student loan debt collectors who often misled borrowers."
2012	Local Reporting	Gina Barton	Milwaukee Journal Sentinel	"for an investigative report on the death of a man in police custody, leading to its re-categorization is a homicide and a medical examiner’s resignation."
2012	Magazine Reporting	Sarah Stillman	The New Yorker	"for 'The Throwaways,' an account of how authorities jeopardized and abandoned teen-aged drug informants."
2012	Justice Reporting	Sam Dolnick	New York Times	"for 'Unlocked,' exposing gang activity, drug use, lax security and decrepit conditions at New Jersey halfway houses owned by a crony of Governor Chris Christie."
2012	State Reporting	Ryan Gabrielson	California Watch	"for exposing how a special police force for developmental centers was failing to solve crimes against the disabled residents."
2012	Medical Reporting	Peter Whoriskey	Washington Post	"for 'Biased Research, Big Profits,' a series on pharmaceutical industry payoffs to doctors to promote misleading findings sometimes endangering patients."
2012	Business Reporting	David Barstow Alejandra Xanic von Bertrab	New York Times	"for 'Wal-Mart Abroad,' demonstrating how the giant retailer used bribery to fuel overseas growth."
2012	Education Reporting	Colin Woodard	Maine Sunday Telegram	"for detailing how online education companies steered development of Maine’s digital education policies."
2012	Documentary Television Reporting	Martin Smith Michael Kirk Marcela Gaviria Jim Gilmore Mike Wiser	Frontline	for 'Money, Power and Wall Street,' an inside look into the derivation and impact of the 2008 financial crisis.
2011	Career Award	Ronnie Dugger		
2011	Radio Reporting	Ira Glass	This American Life	"for 'Very Tough Love,' a report on excessive punishments ordered by a Georgia drug court judge."
2011	Legal Reporting	Thomas Farragher, Marcella Bombardieri, Jonathan Saltzman, Matt Carroll, Darren Durlach	Boston Globe	"for delving into a high acquittal rate in Massachusetts drunk driving cases."
2011	Television Reporting	Brian Ross, Anna Schecter	ABC News	"for 'Peace Corps: A Trust Betrayed,' accusing the Peace Corps of covering up its failure to protect a woman slain in West Africa and other volunteers."
2011	Medical Reporting	Lance Williams, Christina Jewett, Stephen K. Doig	California Watch	"for a report on how a hospital chain used false diagnoses of rare conditions to over-bill Medicare."
2011	International Reporting	Ben Elgin, Alan Katz, Vernon Silver	Bloomberg News	"for revealing how Western companies sold surveillance technology to repressive governments to use against their opponents."
2011	Local Reporting	A.M. Sheehan, Matt Hongoltz-Hetling	Advertiser Democrat (Oxford County, Maine)	"for a report on Maine’s failure to address abysmal and unsafe conditions in government-subsidized housing."
2011	National Reporting	staff	Wall Street Journal	"for a series on ways federal officials and well-connected investors exploited insider stock trading."
2011	Metropolitan Reporting	Matt Apuzzo; Adam Goldman; Chris Hawley; Eileen Sullivan	Associated Press	"for a revealing look at expansive New York City Police intelligence operations including the targeting of mosques"
2011	Foreign Reporting	Jeffrey Gettleman; Tyler Hicks	New York Times	"for coverage of fighting in South Sudan and Somalia, where Shabbab militants prevented starving people from fleeing."
2011	Military Reporting	C. J. Chivers	New York Times	"for coverage of wars in Libya and Afghanistan, especially dispatches from Misurata where he authenticated Libyan forces’ indiscriminate use of brutal weapons."
2011	Magazine Reporting	Jane Mayer	New Yorker	for 'The Secret Sharer,' a case against the prosecution of an official for espionage for leaking information that led prosecutors to drop all major charges.
2011	Television Documentary	May Ying Welsh, Hassan Mahfood	Al Jazeera English	for 'Bahrain: Shouting in the Dark,'
2011	Sports Reporting	Sara Ganim	Patriot-News (Harrisburg, Pennsylvania)	"for revelatory coverage of Penn State’s cover-up of a coach’s pedophilia, allowing him to abuse more victims."
2010	Career Award	Sandy Close		
2010	Television Reporting	A.C. Thompson, Laura Maggi and Brendan McCarthy, and Raney Aronson-Rath and Tom Jennings	ProPublica PBS, Frontline New Orleans Times-Picayune	"for 'Law and Disorder,' examining claims police shot 10 people, killing four, in post-Katrina New Orleans."
2010	Radio Reporting	Daniel Zwerdling, T. Christian Miller	National Public Radio; ProPublica	"for 'Brain Wars,' which found that the U. S. military provided inadequate diagnoses and treatment of traumatic brain injuries suffered by thousands of soldiers in Iraq and Afghanistan."
2010	Commentary	Juan Gonzalez	Daily News (New York)	for columns on a failed $700 million overhaul of New York City's electronic payroll system and the mayor’s failure to pick up on persistent signs of mismanagement.
2010	Military Reporting	Dexter Filkins, Mark Mazzetti	New York Times	"for a sobering behind-the-scenes look at U. S. conduct in Afghanistan"
2010	Criminal Justice Reporting	John Diedrich, Ben Poston	Milwaukee Journal Sentinel	"for 'Wiped Clean,' a series revealing how infrequently the U.S. Bureau of Alcohol, Tobacco, Firearms and Explosives revokes the licenses of lawbreaking gun dealers."
2010	Education Reporting		Bloomberg News	"for 'Education Inc.,' a series showing that for-profit colleges recruited unlikely students for dubious programs to cash in on $26.5 in annual federal financial aid."
2010	Metropolitan Reporting	Amy Brittain, Mark Mueller	Star-Ledger (New Jersey)	"for 'Strong at Any Cost,' a series on New Jersey police officers and firefighters’ rampant use of steroids, often obtained with fake prescriptions."
2010	Local Reporting	Jeff Gottlieb Ruben Vives Staff of the LA Times	Los Angeles Times	"for exposing conditions in Bell, a small working-class city near LA rife with corruption and exorbitance – an administrator was paid $800,000 a year – prompting charges against eight past and present municipal officials."
2010	National Reporting	Dana Priest, William M. Arkin	Washington Post	for 'Top Secret America,' detailing the proliferation of a huge ecosystem of military, intelligence and corporate interests spawned after 9/11.
2010	Foreign Reporting	Clifford J. Levy, Ellen Barry	New York Times	"for 'Above the Law,' a series that examined corruption and abuse of power in Russia two decades after the fall of Communism,"
2010	Environmental Reporting		Associated Press	"for coverage of the massive oil spill in the Gulf of Mexico"
2010	Magazine Reporting	Michael Hastings	Rolling Stone	"for 'The Runaway General,' a profile of General Stanley McChrystal that led President Obama to dismiss him as commander of U.S. and NATO forces in Afghanistan.
2009	Career Award	Gene Roberts		
2009	Foreign Reporting	David Rohde	New York Times	for 'Held by the Taliban,' a series detailing Rohde's own seven months in captivity."
2009	Videography	people recording the death of Neda Agha-Soltan		
2009	National Reporting	Mark Pittman, Bob Ivry, Alison Fitzgerald, Craig Torres	Bloomberg News	"for articles challenging the Treasury Department and Federal Reserve Board to open their books on trillions of dollars in bailout aid that went to financial institutions."
2009	State Reporting	Raquel Rutledge	Milwaukee Journal Sentinel	"for portraying Wisconsin’s $350-million child-care system as a hotbed of criminal activity that repeatedly endangers children."
2009	Local Reporting	George Pawlaczyk, Beth Hundsdorfer	Belleville News-Democrat (Belleville, Illinois)	"or 'Trapped in Tamms' a series on harsh conditions at an Illinois “supermax” prison where inmates, many mentally ill, were held in solitary confinement 23 hours a day for more than 10 years."
2009	Sports Reporting	Alan Schwarz	New York Times	"for a report on long-term dangers of concussions and the National Football League’s flawed response to the issue."
2009	International Television Reporting	Dan Rivers, Kit Swartz, Kocha Olarn, Theerasak Nitipiched	CNN	"for tracking the nightmarish existence of Rohingya refugees in southeast Asia."
2009	National Television Reporting	Steve Kroft, Leslie Cockburn	CBS News, 60 Minutes	"for 'The Price of Oil,' which detailed Wall Street’s growing influence on speculative oil prices.
2009	Business Reporting	Kathy Chu	USA Today	"for 'Credit Trap,' which documented how banks and other credit card issuers reap tens of billions of dollars in profit each year from steep fees and unscrupulous practices."
2009	Military Reporting	Charlie Reed, Kevin Baron, Leo Shane III	Stars and Stripes	"for 'Shaping the Message,' a series that revealed that the Pentagon had used a public relations company to profile journalists and steer them toward positive coverage of the war in Afghanistan"
2009	Magazine Reporting	David Grann	New Yorker	"for 'Trial by Fire,' debunking expert testimony in a 1991 arson case as pseudo science in presenting what may be the first thoroughly documented case of the execution of an innocent man under the modern American judicial system."
2009	Environmental Reporting	Abrahm Lustgarten	ProPublica	"for examining possible carcinogenic effects of natural gas drilling by hydraulic fracturing."
2008	Career Award	Gay Talese		
2008	Foreign Reporting	Barry Bearak, Celia W. Dugger	New York Times	"whose coverage of violence in Zimbabwe after the disputed re-election of President Robert Mugabe was unimpeded by the four-day jailing of Bearak."
2008	International Reporting	Paul Salopek	Chicago Tribune	"for articles on rendition of suspects and other U.S. antiterrorist activity in remote areas on the Horn of Africa in Kenya, Ethiopia, Djibouti, Somalia, Sudan and Eritrea."
2008	National Reporting	David Barstow	New York Times	for 'Message Machine,' a two-part series documenting how retired military officers turned news analysts mouthed Pentagon talking points and plugged defense contractors who employed them as consultants
2008	Military Reporting	Eric Nalder	Seattle Post-Intelligencer	"for 'Demoted to Private: America's Military Housing Disaster,' a series revealing that the Pentagon awarded a billion dollars in contracts to politically connected contractors in a dubious effort to privatize military housing construction."
2008	Local Reporting	Jim Schaefer, M.L. Elrick	Detroit Free Press	"for revealing Detroit’s mayor used $8.4 million in city funds to settle a whistle-blower case in exchange for destroying evidence of his affair with an aide and lied under oath about it, leading to his resignation and jailing.
2008	Labor Reporting	Paul Pringle	Los Angeles Times	"for 'Union Boss Under Fire,' an account of how a union local representing 160,000 mostly low-wage workers paid hundreds of thousands of dollars to companies owned by relatives of its president, who was subsequently removed from office."
2008	Justice Reporting	Ryan Gabrielson, Paul Giblin	East Valley Tribune (Mesa, Arizona)	”a five-part series on Maricopa County Sheriff Joe Arpaio's extra-legal campaign against illegal immigrants"
2008	Magazine Reporting	Richard Behar	Fast Company	"for 'China Storms Africa,' published in the business magazine Fast Company, detailing China’s drive to invest in sub-Saharan African nations to acquire raw materials for manufacturing."
2008	Environmental Reporting	Susanne Rust, Meg Kissinger	Milwaukee Journal Sentinel	"for a series on the failure of federal agencies to monitor and regulate potentially harmful toxins found in everyday materials from microwave-safe plastics to baby bottles."
2008	Sports Reporting	Ken Armstrong, Nick Perry	Seattle Times	for 'Victory and Ruins,' a series revealing that two dozen members of the 2001 University of Washington Rose Bowl team were allowed to play despite their arrests, some for violent felonies.
2008	Television Reporting	Scott Pelley, Solly Granatstein, Nicole Young	CBS News, 60 Minutes	"for 'The Wasteland,' exposing how U.S. companies paid to recycle electronic waste dumped it in China, leading to ecological despoliation and health concerns."
2008	Documentary Reporting	Stefan Forbes	Independent producer	"for 'Boogie Man: The Lee Atwater Story,' a portrait of a multi-faceted Republican strategist whose controversial tactics continued to influence politics long after his death".
2008	Radio Reporting	Alex Blumberg	This American Life	"for 'The Giant Pool of Money,' a collaborative explanation of the complex chain of events that led to the subprime mortgage crisis."
2007	Career Award	John McPhee		
2007	Television Reporting	Jim Sciutto, Angus Hines, Tom Murphy	ABC News, ABC World News with Charles Gibson	"who posed as tourists to secretly tape violent government crackdowns on protestors in Myanmar."
2007	Political Reporting	Barton D. Gellman, Jo Becker	Washington Post	"for a series on Vice President Dick Cheney's role as the architect of tortuous interrogation, military tribunals and other hard-line U.S. policies."
2007	Foreign Reporting	Leila Fadel	McClatchy Company	"for chilling, first-hand accounts of ethnically inspired violence and murder in Iraq."
2007	Environmental Reporting	Shai Oster	Wall Street Journal	"for disclosing how China’s $22 billion Three Gorges Dam on the Yangtze River devastated villages, causing landslides and displaced 4 million residents."
2007	Medical Reporting	Charles A. Duhigg	New York Times	"for exposing unethical practices by nursing homes, long-term care insurers and allied businesses and investors that put the elderly at risk."
2007	Legal Reporting	Josh Marshall	Talking Points Memo	"for reports uncovering politically motivated dismissals of United States attorneys."
2007	Consumer Reporting		Chicago Tribune	"for accounts of children suffering injury and death from exposure to lead-tainted toys, defective cribs and other dangerous products, many imported from China."
2007	Book Award	Jeremy Scahill for Blackwater	Nation Books	
2007	Magazine Reporting	Joshua A. Kors	The Nation	for articles in The Nation, on the U.S. Army's denial of disability and medical benefits to thousands of Iraqi War veterans, asserting they had pre-existing 'personality disorders.'
2007	Financial Reporting	Edward Chancellor	Institutional Investor	for 'Ponzi Nation,' sounding an alarm months before the crisis in financial markets over subprime mortgages and poorly regulated hedge funds emerged.
2007	Economic Reporting		Charlotte Observer	"for a prescient series tying the area's high rate of housing foreclosures to subprime mortgage loans."
2007	State Reporting	Jerry W. Mitchell	Jackson Clarion-Ledger	"for revealing that outbreaks of tuberculosis and syphilis and an alarming increase in infant mortality went unreported by the Mississippi Department of Health."
2007	Local Reporting	Chauncey W. Bailey Jr.	Oakland Post	"slain while investigating a business linked to kidnapping, rape, torture, and several killings, now including his own."
2006	Documentary Television	Spike Lee, Sam Pollard	HBO	"for When the Levees Broke: A Requiem in Four Acts on HBO on the human misery and paltry government response in the aftermath of Hurricane Katrina"
2006	Foreign Reporting	Lydia Polgreen	New York Times	"for coverage of a under-reported war in Darfur in western Sudan and Chad that killed 200,000 and displaced 2.5 million."
2006	Network Television Reporting	Lisa Myers, Adam Ciralsky	NBC News, NBC Nightly News with Brian Williams	"for detailing the awarding of a $70 million defense contract to a U.S. company despite a far cheaper alternative developed in Israel."
2006	Military Reporting	Lisa Chedekel, Matthew Kauffman	Hartford Courant	for "Mentally Unfit, Forced to Fight,' a four-part series on the high rate of suicide among American troops.
2006	Medical Reporting	Robert Little	Baltimore Sun	"for 'Dangerous Remedy,' a series on an experimental blood-coagulating drug administered to more than 1,000 soldiers despite links to fatal clots in the heart, lungs and brain."
2006	Environmental Reporting	Kenneth R. Weiss, Usha Lee McFarling	Los Angeles Times	"for 'Altered Oceans,' a five-part series linking rashes among Australian fishermen, brain-damaged sea lions in California and red tides in Florida to damaging pollution."
2006	Business Reporting	Charles Forelle, James Bandler, Mark Maremont	Wall Street Journal	"for exposing backdating of stock options to enhance executive compensation prompting resignations and charges."
2006	National Reporting	Jeff Kosseff, Bryan Denson, Les Zaitz	Oregonian	"for articles chronicling the failures in a $2.25 billion federal program intended to help people with disabilities find jobs but instead enriched executives at the expense of taxpayers and underpaid workers."
2006	Metropolitan Reporting	Debbie Cenziper	Miami Herald	"for 'House of Lies,' an investigative report documenting mismanagement in the Miami-Dade Housing Agency allowing developers and consultants to amass fortunes while families suffered in shelters and rat-infested buildings."
2006	Local Reporting	staff	Lakefront Outlook (Chicago)	"for revealing that a $19.5 million community center hailed by a city alderman as a local treasure was a deficit-ridden political plum staffed by her family and friends."
2006	Political Reporting	Ray Ring	High Country News	"for revealing that referendums campaigns in six Western states to roll back environmental protections were financed by a wealthy libertarian real estate investor."
2006	Radio Reporting	Producers	University of California, Berkeley Graduate School of Journalism; American Public Media; Living on Earth	'Early Signs: Reports From a Warming Planet,' a documentary on global impacts of climate change produced by students at Cal-Berkeley and aired by “Living on Earth,” American Public Media.
2005	Career Award	Frederick Wiseman		
2005	International Reporting	Cam Simpson, José Moré	Chicago Tribune	
2005	Television Reporting	Brian Ross, Richard Esposito	ABC News	
2005	National Reporting	Dana Priest	Washington Post	
2005	Foreign Reporting	Joe Stephens, David B. Ottaway	Washington Post	
2005	Commentary	Frank Rich, Barry Meier	New York Times	
2005	Metropolitan Reporting	staff	New Orleans Times-Picayune	
2005	Justice Reporting	Jerry Mitchell	Jackson Clarion-Ledger	
2005	Health Reporting	David Evans, Michael Smith, Liz Willen	Bloomberg News	
2005	Political Reporting	Marcus Stern, Jerry Kammer, Dean Calbreath	Copley News Service, San Diego Union-Tribune	
2005	Local Reporting	A. C. Thompson	San Francisco Bay Guardian	
2005	Book Award	Victor S. Navasky	Farrar, Straus and Giroux	for A Matter of Opinion
2005	Radio Reporting	JoAnn Mar	Independent producer	"for “Crime Pays: A Look at Who's Getting Rich from the Prison Boom,” an hour-long documentary distributed by PRX"
2004	Career Award	Bill Moyers		
2004	Foreign Reporting	Paisley Dodds	Associated Press	
2004	War Reporting	Dexter Filkins	New York Times	
2004	Sports Reporting	Lance Williams and Mark Fainaru-Wada	San Francisco Chronicle	
2004	Television Reporting	Diane Sawyer, Robbie Gordon	ABC News, Primetime Live	
2004	National Reporting	Walt Bogdanich	New York Times	
2004	Military Reporting	Diana B. Henriques	New York Times	
2004	Economic Reporting	Ellen E. Schultz, Theo Francis	Wall Street Journal	
2004	Magazine Reporting	Seymour Hersh	The New Yorker	
2004	Labor Reporting	Justin Pritchard	Associated Press	
2004	Regional Reporting	four reporters and a photographer	The Press Democrat (Santa Rosa, California)	
2004	State Reporting	John Hill, Dorothy Korber	Sacramento Bee	
2004	Local Reporting	Tim Novak, Steve Warmbir	Chicago Sun-Times	
2003	Foreign Reporting	Somini Sengupta	New York Times	
2003	Radio Reporting	Anne Garrels	National Public Radio	
2003	Photojournalism	Carolyn Cole	Los Angeles Times	
2003	Economics Reporting	Nancy Cleeland, Abigail Goldman, Evelyn Iritani, Tyler Marshall	Los Angeles Times	
2003	Business Reporting	Pete Engardio, Aaron Bernstein, Manjeet Kripalani	Business Week	
2003	Labor Reporting	David Barstow, Lowell Bergman, Neil Docherty, Linden MacIntyre, David Rummel	New York Times; PBS, Frontline; Canadian Broadcasting Corporation	
2003	National Reporting	Cam Simpson, Flynn McRoberts, Liz Sly	Chicago Tribune	
2003	Internet Reporting		Center for Public Integrity	
2003	Magazine Reporting	Michael Hudson, Bill Barrow, Mary Kane, Taylor Loyal, Kenneth Harris, Keith Ernst, Robert Manning	Southern Exposure	
2003	State Reporting	Dave Altimari, Jon Lender, Edmund H. Mahony	Hartford Courant	
2003	Education Reporting	Daniel Golden	Wall Street Journal	
2003	Local Reporting	Duff Wilson, Brian Joseph, Sheila Farr	Seattle Times	
2003	Television Reporting	Andrew Smith, Liviu Tipuriță	CNN, CNN Presents	
2003	Career Award	F. Gilman Spencer	New York Daily News	
2002	Career Award	Morley Safer	CBS News	
2002	Foreign Reporting	Anthony Shadid	Boston Globe	
2002	National Reporting	reporters and editors	Boston Globe	
2002	Regional Reporting	Clifford J. Levy	New York Times	
2002	Health Care Reporting	Walt Bogdanich, Barry Meier, Mary Williams Walsh	New York Times	
2002	International Reporting	Sonia Nazario, Don Bartletti	Los Angeles Times	
2002	Environmental Reporting	Debbie Salamone, Ramsey Campbell, Robert Sargent	Orlando Sentinel	
2002	Criminal Justice Reporting	Michael Luo	Associated Press	
2002	Financial Reporting	Ellen E. Schultz, Theo Francis	Wall Street Journal	
2002	Medical Reporting	Stephen Kiernan, Cadence Mertz	Burlington Free Press (Vermont)	
2002	Magazine Reporting	Arnold S. Relman, Marcia Angell	New Republic	
2002	Local Reporting	Jason Riley, R. G. Dunlop	Louisville Courier-Journal	
2002	Television Reporting	Phil Williams, Bryan Staples	WTVF (Nashville)	
2002	Cultural Criticism	Susan Sontag	New Yorker	
2001	Television and Radio Reporting	Stephen Evans	BBC World and BBC World Service	
2001	Foreign Reporting	Barry Bearak	New York Times	
2001	National Reporting		New York Times	
2001	Magazine Reporting	Bernard Lewis	New Yorker	
2001	Book Award	Joan Didion	Political Fictions	
2001	Medical Reporting	Duff Wilson, David Heath	Seattle Times	
2001	Financial Reporting	Susan Pulliam, Randall Smith	Wall Street Journal	
2001	Metropolitan Reporting	Bill Theobald, Bonnie Harris	Indianapolis Star	
2001	International Reporting	Sudarsan Raghavan, Sumana Chatterjee	Knight Ridder	
2001	Regional Reporting	Jesse A. Hamilton, Stephanie Earls, Tom Roeder, Mark Morey	Yakima Herald-Republic (Yakima, Washington)	
2001	Local Reporting	Heidi Evans, Dave Saltonstall	Daily News (New York)	
2001	Environmental Reporting	Lisa Davis	San Francisco Weekly	
2001	Career Award	Edna Buchanan	Miami Herald	
2000	Magazine Reporting	Donald L. Barlett, James B. Steele	Time	
2000	Book Award	Laurie Garrett	Betrayal of Trust	
2000	Career Award	John B. Oakes	The New York Times	
2000	National Reporting	Michael Grunwald	Washington Post	
2000	Transportation Reporting	Scott McCartney	Wall Street Journal	
2000	Local Television Reporting	Anna Werner, David Raziq, Chris Henao	KHOU-TV (Houston)	
2000	Network Television Reporting	John Larson, Allan Maraynes, Lynne Dale, Neal Shapiro, Andy Lehren	NBC News, Dateline	
2000	Political Reporting	Virginia Ellis	Los Angeles Times	
2000	Statewide Reporting	Kevin Corcoran, Joe Fahy	Indianapolis Star	
2000	Healthcare Reporting	Sam Hodges, William Rabb	Mobile Register (Alabama)	
2000	Foreign Reporting	Alma Guillermoprieto	New York Review of Books	
2000	Special Award		New York Times	
1999	Foreign Reporting	Paul Watson	Los Angeles Times	
1999	Television Foreign Reporting	Giselle Portenier, Olenka Frenkiel, Fiona Murch	BBC News	
1999	International Reporting	Sang-hun Choe, Charles J. Hanley, Martha Mendoza, Randy Herschaft	Associated Press	
1999	National Reporting	Jason DeParle	New York Times	
1999	Regional Reporting	Todd Richissin, Andre Chung	Baltimore Sun	
1999	Criminal Justice Reporting	Ken Armstrong, Steve Mills	Chicago Tribune	
1999	Local Reporting	Kevin Carmody	Daily Southtown (Illinois)	
1999	Local Television Reporting	The "I" Team	WWOR (New Jersey)	
1999	Editorial Writing		New York Daily News	
1999	Financial Reporting	Ellen E. Schultz	Wall Street Journal	
1999	Medical Reporting	Andrea Gerlin	Philadelphia Inquirer	
1999	Special Award	National Security Archive		
1999	Career Award	Studs Terkel		
1998	Book Award	Philip Gourevitch	New Yorker	
1998	Career Award	Russell Baker	New York Times	
1998	Commentary	Juan Gonzalez	Daily News (New York)	
1998	Economic Reporting	Mary Jordan, Keith Richburg, Kevin Sullivan	Washington Post	
1998	Environmental Reporting	Gardiner Harris, R. G. Dunlop	Louisville Courier-Journal	
1998	Foreign Reporting	Tracy Wilkinson	Los Angeles Times	
1998	International Reporting	Alix M. Freedman	Wall Street Journal	
1998	Legal Reporting	Joe Stephens	Kansas City Star	
1998	Local Reporting	Clifford J. Levy	New York Times	
1998	Medical Reporting	Robert Whitaker, Dolores Kong	Boston Globe	
1998	National Reporting	Donald L. Barlett, James B. Steele	Time	
1998	Radio Reporting	Amy Goodman, Jeremy Scahill	Pacifica Radio, Democracy Now!	
1998	Television Reporting	Brian Ross, Rhonda Schwartz	ABC News, 20/20	
1997	Career Award		Pittsburgh Courier	
1997	Foreign Reporting	Laurie Garrett	Newsday	
1997	Network TV Reporting	Brian Ross, Rhonda Schwartz	ABC News, Primetime Live	
1997	Military Affairs Reporting		Dayton Daily News	
1997	Medical Reporting		Wall Street Journal	
1997	Business Reporting	Kurt Eichenwald, Martin Gottlieb	New York Times	
1997	National Reporting	Keith Bradsher	New York Times	
1997	Local Reporting		Pensacola News Journal	
1997	Environmental Reporting	Will Englund, Gary Cohn, Perry Thorsvik	Baltimore Sun	
1997	Book Award	Horst Faas, Tim Page, Requiem	Random House	
1997	Sports Reporting		Kansas City Star	
1997	International Reporting	Michael Dobbs	Washington Post	
1997	Magazine Reporting	Adam Gopnik	New Yorker	
1996	Criticism Award	Blair Kamin	Chicago Tribune	
1996	National TV Reporting	Matt Meagher, Tim Peek	Inside Edition	
1996	Economics Reporting		New York Times	
1996	National Reporting	Elizabeth Marchak	Cleveland Plain Dealer	
1996	Political Reporting		Los Angeles Times	
1996	Cultural Reporting	Chuck Philips	Los Angeles Times	
1996	Magazine Reporting	Anne-Marie Cusac	The Progressive	
1996	Local Reporting	Kevin Collison	Buffalo News	
1996	Transportation Reporting	Byron Acohido	Seattle Times	
1996	Foreign Reporting	John F. Burns	New York Times	
1996	Foreign TV Reporting	Christiane Amanpour, Anita Pratap	CNN	
1995	Career Award	John K. Cooley	ABC News	
1995	Foreign Reporting	David Rohde	Christian Science Monitor	
1995	National Reporting	Michael Weisskopf, David Maraniss	Washington Post	
1995	Local Reporting	Elizabeth Llorente	The Record (Bergen County, New Jersey)	
1995	Metropolitan Reporting	Frank Bruni, Nina Bernstein, Joyce Purnick, Lizette Alverez	New York Times	
1995	Magazine Reporting	Richard Behar	Fortune	
1995	Education Reporting	Steve Stecklow	Wall Street Journal	
1995	Business Reporting	Kurt Eichenwald	New York Times	
1995	Health Care Reporting	Chris Adams	New Orleans Times-Picayune	
1995	Medical Reporting		Orange County Register (California)	
1995	Local Television Reporting	Tom Grant	KREM-TV (Spokane, Washington)	
1995	Consumer Reporting	Lea Thompson, Jack Cloherty, Sandra Surles	NBC News, Dateline	
1995	Network TV Reporting	Jim Clancy	CNN	
1994	Magazine Reporting	Allan Nairn	The Nation	
1994	Medical Reporting	Dave Davis, Joan Mazzolini	Cleveland Plain Dealer	
1994	Education Reporting	Olive Talley	Dallas Morning News	
1994	Environmental Reporting	Jim Lynch, Karen Dorn Steele	Spokesman-Review (Spokane)	
1994	Political Reporting	Joe Stephens	Kansas City Star	
1994	Local Reporting	Sonia Nazario	Los Angeles Times	
1994	Metropolitan Reporting	David Armstrong, Shelley Murphy, Stephan Kurkjian	Boston Globe	
1994	National Reporting	Joel Brinkley, Deborah Sontag, Stephen Engelberg	New York Times	
1994	Foreign Reporting	Barbara Demick	Philadelphia Inquirer	
1994	Television Documentary	Steven Emerson, Martin Koughan	SAE Productions	“Jihad in America,” aired on PBS
1994	Network Television reporting	John Martin, Walt Bogdanich, Keith Summa	ABC News, Day One	
1994	Career Award	Philip Hamburger	New Yorker	
1993	Medical Reporting	Larry Keller, Fred Schulte	Sun-Sentinel	
1993	Magazine Reporting	Oliver Sacks	New Yorker	
1993	Business Reporting	Paul Nyden	Charleston Gazette	
1993	Foreign Reporting	Keith Richburg	Washington Post	
1993	Local Reporting	Ying Chan	New York Daily News	
1993	National Reporting	Eileen Welsome	Albuquerque Tribune	
1993	Political Reporting		State Journal-Register	
1993	Financial Reporting	Scot J. Paltrow	Los Angeles Times	
1993	Regional Reporting	Isabel Wilkerson	New York Times	
1993	Radio Commentary	Daniel Schorr	National Public Radio	
1993	Book	David Remnick for Lenin's Tomb: The Last Days of the Soviet Empire		
1993	Career Award	Richard Dudman	St. Louis Post-Dispatch	
1993	Television Reporting	Christiane Amanpour	CNN	
1992	Local Reporting		Los Angeles Times	
1992	National Reporting	Gregory Vistica	San Diego Union-Tribune	
1992	Foreign Reporting	Roy Gutman	Newsday	
1992	Legal Reporting	Marianne Lavelle, Marcia Coyle, Claudia MacLachian	National Law Journal	
1992	Magazine Reporting	Lawrence Weschler	New Yorker	
1992	Health Reporting	Seth Rosenfeld	San Francisco Examiner	
1992	Environmental Reporting	John Thor Dahlburg	Los Angeles Times	
1992	Photography	Carlos M. Guerrero	El Nuevo Herald	
1992	Radio Reporting	Tom Gjelten	National Public Radio	
1992	National TV Reporting	Brian Ross, Rhonda Schwartz	NBC News, Dateline	
1992	Foreign TV Reporting	Chris Wallace, Neal Shapiro, Anthony Radziwill	ABC News, Primetime Live	
1992	Social Commentary	Henry Louis Gates Jr.	New York Times op-ed	
1992	Career Award	Herbert Mitgang	New York Times	
1991	Radio Reporting	Nina Totenberg	National Public Radio	
1991	Local Television	Christopher Scholl	KWWL (Iowa)	
1991	National Television	Glenn Silber, Robert Krulwich, David Fanning, Sharon Tiller	PBS, Frontline; Center for Investigative Reporting	
1991	Cultural Reporting	Konstantin Akinsha, Grigorii Kozlov	ARTnews	
1991	Special Award	Andrew Schneider, Mary Pat Flaherty	Pittsburgh Press	
1991	Education Reporting	Jeff Gottlieb	San Jose Mercury News	
1991	Economic Reporting	Donald L. Barlett, James B. Steele	Philadelphia Inquirer	
1991	War Reporting	Patrick J. Sloyan	Newsday	
1991	Local Reporting	Holly A. Taylor	Berkshire Eagle	
1991	Regional Reporting	Dan Barry, John Sullivan, Ira Chinoy	Providence Journal-Bulletin	
1991	National Reporting	Jeff Taylor, Mike McGraw	Kansas City Star	
1991	Foreign Reporting	Francis X. Clines	New York Times	
1991	Foreign Reporting	Barbara Crossette	New York Times	
1991	Career Award	Claude Fox Sitton		
1990	Foreign Reporting	Caryle Murphy	Washington Post	
1990	National Reporting	Susan Rasky, David E. Rosenbaum	New York Times	
1990	Regional Reporting	Gayle Reaves, David Hanners, David McLemore	Dallas Morning News	
1990	Local Reporting	Heidi Evans	New York Daily News	
1990	Environmental Reporting	Adam Seessel	Independent Weekly	
1990	Business Reporting	Dianne Marder	Philadelphia Inquirer	
1990	Special Publications	Joseph M. Belth	Insurance Forum	
1990	Special Award		Globalvision	for “South Africa Now,” defying censors to report on the country's turbulence and violence against its black majority.
1990	Documentary Television	Hedrick Smith, Martin Smith	WGBH-TV (Boston) and Martin Smith Productions	“Inside Gorbachev's U.S.S.R."
1990	Local Television Reporting	Kevin Kerrigan	Guam Cable Television	
1990	Network Television Reporting	Peter Jennings, Leslie Cockburn, Tom Yellin	ABC News	
1990	Career Award	Fred Friendly		
1990	Metropolitan Reporting	Laurie Bennett, Alan Fisk, Robert Ourlian	Detroit News	
1989	Foreign Reporting	Nicholas Kristof, Sheryl WuDunn	New York Times	
1989	National Reporting	Rick Atkinson	Washington Post	
1989	Local Reporting		Hartford Courant	
1989	Local Television Reporting		WCSC-TV/Charleston, SC	
1989	TV Investigative Reporting	Jonathan Kwitny	WNYC-TV (New York)	
1989	Network TV Reporting		CBS News	
1989	Radio Reporting	Robert Knight	WBAI (New York)	
1989	International Reporting	Stephen Engelberg, Michael R. Gordon	New York Times	
1989	Medical Reporting	John Crewdson	Chicago Tribune	
1989	Political Reporting	Andrew Melnykovych	Casper Star-Tribune	
1989	Regional Reporting	Miranda Ewell, David Schrieberg	San Jose Mercury News	
1989	Career Award	Fred Hechinger	New York Times	
1988	Foreign Reporting	John Kifner	New York Times	
1988	National Reporting	Keith Schneider	New York Times	
1988	Local Reporting	David Gomez, Patricia Guthrie	Albuquerque Tribune	
1988	Financial Reporting		National Thrift News	
1988	Environmental Reporting	Mary Bishop	Roanoke Times & World-News	
1988	Local Television Reporting		KING-TV (Seattle)	
1988	Network Television Reporting	Brian Ross, Ira Silverman	NBC News	
1988	Economic Reporting	Donald L. Barlette, James B. Steele	Philadelphia Inquirer	
1988	Radio Reporting	Patricia Neighmond	National Public Radio	
1988	Cultural Reporting	Lawrence Weschler	Shapinsky’s Karma, Bogg’s Bills (North Point Press)	
1988	Photojournalism	Mary Ellen Mark	Streetwise	
1988	Career Award	William Shawn	The New Yorker	
1987	Foreign Reporting	Nora Boustany	Washington Post	
1987	National Reporting	Mike Masterson, Chuck Cook, Mark N. Trahant	Arizona Republic	
1987	Local Reporting	Ron Ridenhour	New Orleans CityBusiness	
1987	Financial Reporting	Daniel Hertzberg, James B. Stewart	Wall Street Journal	
1987	Metropolitan Reporting		Charlotte Observer	
1987	Local Television Reporting	Margie Nichols	WSMV-TV (Nashville)	
1987	Network Television Reporting		CNN	
1987	Radio Reporting	Larry Bensky	Pacifica Radio	
1987	Sports Reporting	Chris Mortensen	Atlanta Journal-Constitution	
1987	Science Reporting		Science News	
1987	Political Reporting	Washington Bureau	Knight Ridder	
1987	Foreign Television Reporting	Gordon Manning	NBC News	
1987	Magazine Reporting	Roger Rosenblatt	Time	
1987	Career Award	Murray Kempton	Newsday and New York Newsday	
1986	Foreign Reporting		Newsweek	
1986	National Reporting	Andrew Wolfson, Daniel Rubin	Louisville Courier-Journal	
1986	Local Reporting	Sally Jacobs	Raleigh News & Observer	
1986	Regional Reporting	Alex Beasley, Rosemary Goudreau	Orlando Sentinel	
1986	Financial Reporting	Peter G. Gosselin	Boston Globe	
1986	Science Reporting		Science Times	
1986	Environmental Reporting		High Country News	
1986	International TV Reporting	David Fanning, Martin Smith	PBS, Frontline	
1986	National Television Reporting	Bill Moyers	CBS News, CBS Reports	
1986	Local Television Reporting	Lee Coppola	WKBW-TV (Buffalo)	
1986	Book	Richard Kluger		Award for The Paper: The Life and Death of the New York Herald Tribune
1986	Career Award	James Reston	New York Times	
1985	Foreign Reporting	Alan Cowell	New York Times	
1985	International Reporting	Pete Carey, Katherine Ellison, Lewis M. Simons	San Jose Mercury News	
1985	National Reporting	Diana Griego, Louis Kilzer	Denver Post	
1985	Local Reporting	Stan Jones	Fairbanks Daily News-Miner	
1985	Metropolitan Reporting	Jimmy Breslin	New York Daily News	
1985	Political Reporting	Frank Greve	Knight Ridder	
1985	Business Reporting	Spotlight/Business Team	Boston Globe	
1985	Medical Reporting	Lawerence K. Altman	New York Times	
1985	Criticism	Arthur C. Danto	The Nation	
1985	Radio Reporting	Peter Laufer	NBC Radio News	
1985	Network Television Reporting	Ted Koppel, Richard N. Kaplan	ABC News, Nightline	
1985	Local Television Reporting	Vic Lee, Craig Franklin, Brian McTigue	KRON-TV (San Francisco)	
1985	Career Award	George Tames	New York Times	
1984	Foreign Reporting	Mark Fineman	Philadelphia Inquirer	
1984	National Reporting	Robert Parry	Associated Press	
1984	Local Reporting	Ellen Whitford	Virginian-Pilot (Norfolk, Virginia)	
1984	Medical Reporting	William R. Ritz, John Aloysius Farrell	Denver Post	
1984	Environmental Reporting	Tom Harris, Jim Morris	Sacramento Bee	
1984	Special Interest Reporting	Lois R. Ember	Chemical & Engineering News	
1984	Magazine Reporting	John Vinocur	New York Times Magazine	
1984	News Photography	Ozier Muhammad	Newsday	
1984	Special Award	"Amnesty International Report"	Amnesty International	
1984	Foreign Television Reporting	Michael Buerk, Mohamed Amin	BBC, Visnews, NBC News	
1984	National Television Reporting	Alex Kotlowitz, Kwame Holman, Susan Ades	PBS, MacNeil/Lehrer NewsHour	
1984	Local Television Reporting	Rick Nelson, Joe Collum	KPRC-TV (Houston)	
1984	Career Award	Red Barber		
1983	Foreign Reporting	Joseph Lelyveld	New York Times	
1983	National Reporting	Robert M. Frump, Timothy Dwyer	Philadelphia Inquirer	
1983	Regional Reporting	Paul Lieberman, Celia Dugger	Atlanta Journal-Constitution	
1983	Local Reporting	Jim McGee	Miami Herald	
1983	Foreign Affairs Reporting	Philip Taubman	New York Times	
1983	Economics Reporting	Dennis Camire, Mark Rohner	Gannett News Service	
1983	Consumer Reporting	Marcia Stepanek, Stephen Franklin	Detroit Free Press	
1983	Medical Reporting	Benjamin Weiser	Washington Post	
1983	Network Television Reporting	Don McNeill	CBS News	
1983	Local Television Reporting	John Fosholt, Ward Lucas	KBTV (Denver)	
1983	Documentary Television	"Vietnam: A Television History"	WGBH-TV (Boston), and aired on PBS	
1983	Special Interest Reporting	The Amicus Journal	Natural Resources Defense Council	
1983	Special Award	Youssef M. Ibrahim	Wall Street Journal	
1983	Career Award	William Lawrence Shirer		
1982	Foreign Reporting	Thomas L. Friedman, David K. Shipler	New York Times	
1982	National Reporting	Richard Halloran	New York Times	
1982	Regional Reporting	Jim Henderson	Dallas Times Herald	
1982	Metropolitan Reporting	Doug Cumming	Providence Journal-Bulletin	
1982	Local Reporting	David Johnston, Joel Sappell	Los Angeles Times	
1982	Magazine Reporting	Roger Rosenblatt	Time	
1982	Financial Reporting	Phillip L. Zweig	American Banker	
1982	Criticism	Stanley Kauffmann	New Republic	
1982	News Photography	Robby Castro	Associated Press	
1982	Network Television Reporting	Martin Smith, Ed Rabel	CBS News	
1982	Local Television Reporting	Dick Gelfman, Theresa Crawford, John Sur	WBAL-TV (Baltimore)	
1982	Documentary Television	Andrew A. Stern	PBS	How Much Is Enough: Decision Making in the Nuclear Age
1982	Special Award	Rod Nordland	Philadelphia Inquirer	
1981	Foreign Reporting	John Darnton	New York Times	
1981	National Reporting	Seymour M. Hersh, Jeff Gerth, Phillip Taubman	New York Times	
1981	Regional Reporting	Stephanie Saul, W. Stevens Ricks	Jackson Clarion-Ledger	"Mississippi Gulf Coast: Wide Open and Wicked"
1981	Local Reporting	"The Federal Impact"	Orlando Sentinel-Star	
1981	Consumer Reporting	Phil Norman	Louisville Courier-Journal	
1981	Magazine Reporting	William Greider	The Atlantic	
1981	Book	Edwin R. Bayley for Joe McCarthy and the Press	University of Wisconsin Press	
1981	Science Reporting	"News and Comments"	Science	
1981	Television Documentary	Pierre Salinger	ABC News	for "America Held Hostage: The Secret Negotiations."
1981	Television Reporting	Ted Koppel	NBC News, Nightline	
1981	Radio Reporting	John Merrow	Institute for Educational Leadership and National Public Radio	
1981	Career Award	George Seldes	In Fact	
1980	Foreign Reporting	Shirley Christian	Miami Herald	
1980	National Reporting	Jonathan Neuman, Ted Gup	Washington Post	
1980	Local Reporting		Miami Herald	
1980	Regional Reporting		Charlotte Observer	
1980	Editorials	Editorial Board	New York Times	
1980	Commentary	Roger Angell	New Yorker	
1980	News Photography	Oscar Sabatta	United Press International	
1980	Satiric Drawings	Edward Sorel		
1980	Cultural Reporting		ARTnews	
1980	National Radio Reporting		National Public Radio	
1980	Local Radio Reporting	Station	KMOX (St. Louis)	
1980	Political Reporting	Bill Moyers	WNET (New York)	
1980	Local Television Reporting	Stephen Talbot, Jonathan Dann	KQED (San Francisco)	
1980	National Television Reporting	Charles Kuralt	CBS News	
1980	Special Award	Leonard Karlin	LIU alumnus/Polk Citation Writer	
1979	Foreign Reporting	John Kifner	New York Times	
1979	National Reporting	Brian Donovan, Bob Wyrick, Stuart Diamond	Newsday	
1979	Regional Reporting	Jim Adams, Jim Detjen	Louisville Courier-Journal	
1979	Metropolitan Reporting	Walt Bogdanich, Walter Johns Jr.	Cleveland Press	
1979	Local Reporting	Ed Petykiewicz	Saginaw News	
1979	Documentary	Jack Willis, Saul Landau	New Time Films, Inc.	Paul Jacobs and the Nuclear Gang
1979	National Television Reporting		WRC-TV (Washington, D.C.)	
1979	Foreign Television Reporting	Ed Bradley	CBS News, 60 Minutes	
1979	Political Reporting	Jack Newfield	Village Voice	
1979	Commentary	"Notes and Comments" Talk of the Town,	New Yorker	
1979	Book	William Shawcross for Sideshow: Kissinger, Nixon and the Destruction of Cambodia	Simon & Schuster	
1979	News Photography	"Firing Squad" - Name Withheld	United Press International	
1979	Special Interest Reporting	Wilbert Rideau, Billy Sinclair	The Angolite (Louisiana State Penitentiary)	
1979	Career Award	Alden Whitman	New York Times	
1978	Foreign Reporting	John F. Burns, John Darnton, Michael T. Kaufman	New York Times	
1978	National Reporting	Ronald Kessler	Washington Post	
1978	Local Reporting		Dallas Times Herald	
1978	Public Service Reporting	Jane Shoemaker, Thomas Ferrick Jr., William Ecenbarger	Philadelphia Inquirer	
1978	Regional Reporting		Southern Exposure	
1978	Educational Reporting		Chronicle of Higher Education	
1978	Television Reporting	Don Harris, Bob Brown	NBC News	
1978	Film Documentary	Scared Straight	Golden West Television Productions	
1978	News Photography	Eddie Adams	Associated Press	
1978	Commentary	Russell Baker	New York Times	
1978	Career Award	Richard S. Salant	CBS News	
1977	Foreign Reporting	Robert C. Toth	Los Angeles Times	
1977	National Reporting	Walter Pincus	Washington Post	
1977	Local Reporting	Len Ackland	Des Moines Register	
1977	Magazine Reporting	Daniel Lang	The New Yorker, Local Radio, Television	
1977	Radio, Television Reporting	Barry Lando	60 Minutes	
1977	Local Radio, Television Reporting	John Stossel	WCBS-TV (New York)	
1977	Science Reporting		New England Journal of Medicine	
1977	Criticism	Peter S. Prescott	Newsweek	
1977	Commentary	Red Smith	New York Times	
1977	Editorial Cartoons	Jeff MacNelly	Richmond News Leader	
1977	News Photography	Eddie Adams	Associated Press	
1977	Career Award	Carey McWilliams	The Nation	
1975	No awards presented			
1974	No awards presented			
1974	Foreign Reporting	Donald Kirk	Chicago Tribune	
1974	National Reporting	Seymour M. Hersh	New York Times	
1974	Metropolitan Reporting	Richard Severo	New York Times	
1974	Community Service	William E. Anderson, Harley R. Bierce, Richard C. Cady	Indianapolis Star	
1974	Magazine Reporting	Edward M. Brecher, Robert H. Harris	Consumer Reports	
1974	Television Documentary		NBC News, NBC White Paper	for examining global malnutrition in "And Who Shall Feed This World?"
1974	News Photography	Werner Baum	Deutsche Presse-Agentur	
1974	Book	Mary Adelaide Mendelson for Tender Loving Greed	Vintage Books	
1974	Special Award	Sydney H. Schanberg	New York Times	
1973	Foreign Reporting	Henry S. Bradsher	Washington Star-News	
1973	National Reporting	Andrew H. Malcolm	New York Times	
1973	Metropolitan Reporting	James Savage, Mike Baxter	Miami Herald	
1973	Local Reporting	Carol Talley, Joan Hayde	Daily Advance (Dover, New Jersey)	
1973	Community Service	William Sherman	New York Daily News	
1973	Investigative Reporting	Seymour Hersh	New York Times	
1973	Magazine Reporting	John F. Osborne	New Republic	
1973	Television Reporting		Public Broadcasting Service, National Public Affairs Center for Television	
1973	Television Documentary	Jeremy Isaacs for "The World at War"	Thames Television (London)	
1973	News Photography	George Brich	Associated Press	
1973	Book	David Wise for The Politics of Lying: Government Deception, Secrecy, and Power	Random House	
1973	Special Award	Donald L. Barlett, James B. Steele	Philadelphia Inquirer	
1972	Foreign Reporting	Jean Thoraval, Jean Leclerc du Sablon	Agence France-Presse	
1972	National Reporting	Carl Bernstein, Robert Woodward	Washington Post	
1972	Metropolitan Reporting	Joseph Martin, Martin McLaughlin, James Ryan	New York Daily News	
1972	Local Reporting	Doris Ellen Olsten	Santa Maria Times (Santa Maria, California	
1972	Community Service	Ronald Kessler	Washington Post	
1972	Investigative Reporting	Jean Heller	Associated Press	
1972	Magazine Reporting	Frances FitzGerald	New Yorker	
1972	Television Reporting	Jim McKay	American Broadcasting Company	
1972	Television News-Documenta	60 Minutes, First Tuesday	CBS News, NBC News	
1972	News Photography	Huynh Cong Ut	Associated Press	
1972	Book	Sanford J. Ungar for The Papers & The Papers: An Account of the Legal and Political Battle Over the Pentagon Papers	E.P. Dutton & Co.	
1972	Special Award	Lesley Oelsner	New York Times	
1971	Foreign Reporting	Sydney H. Schanberg	New York Times	
1971	National Reporting		New York Times	
1971	Metropolitan Reporting	Donald L. Barlett, James B. Steele	Philadelphia Inquirer	
1971	Education Reporting	Joseph Lelyveld	New York Times	
1971	Public Service	Frances Cerra	Newsday	
1971	Magazine Reporting	Ross Terrill	The Atlantic Monthly	
1971	Television Documentary	Peter Davis, Perry Wolff, Roger Mudd	CBS News	for “The Selling of the Pentagon,” which examined the U. S. military's public relations program.
1971	Television Reporting	Phil Brady	NBC News	
1971	News Photography	Horst Faas, Michel Laurent	Associated Press	
1971	Criticism	Richard Harwood	Washington Post	
1971	Book	Erik Barnouw for A Tower in Babel: A History of Broadcasting in the United States	Oxford University Press	
1970	Foreign Reporting	Gloria Emerson	New York Times	
1970	National Reporting		Knight Newspapers	
1970	Metropolitan Reporting	Richard Oliver	New York Daily News	
1970	Community Service	Karl Grossman	Long Island Press	
1970	Editorials	James E. Clayton	Washington Post	
1970	Magazine Reporting		Washington Monthly	
1970	Television Reporting	Alan M. Levin	National Educational Television	"for a documentary on U.S. involvement in underdeveloped nations, Who Invited Us?"
1970	Freedom of The Press Award	Walter Cronkite	CBS News, CBS Evening News with Walter Cronkite	
1970	News Photography	John Darnell, John Foli, Howard Ruffner	Life	
1970	Criticism	Pauline Kael	New Yorker	
1970	Book	Otto Friedrich for Decline and Fall	Harper & Row	
1970	Special Award	I. F. Stone		
1969	Foreign Reporting	Henry Kamm	New York Times	
1969	National Reporting	Walter Rugaber	New York Times	
1969	Metropolitan Reporting	William Federici	New York Daily News	
1969	National TV Reporting	Tom Pettit	National Broadcasting Company	
1969	Local TV Reporting	Lee Hanna	WCBS-TV (New York)	
1969	Magazine Reporting	William Lambert	Life	
1969	News Photography	Stephen Dawson Starr	Associated Press	
1969	Book	Richard Ellmann for The Artist as Critic: Critical Writings of Oscar Wilde	University of Chicago Press	
1969	Special Award	Wes Gallagher	Associated Press	
1969	Special Award	Seymour M. Hersh	Dispatch News Service	
1968	International Reporting	David Kraslow and Stuart H. Loory	Los Angeles Times	
1968	National Reporting	Bernard D. Nossiter	Washington Post	
1968	Regional Reporting	James K. Batten, Dwayne Walls	Charlotte Observer	
1968	Community Service	David Burnam	New York Times	
1968	Political Reporting	Martin Arnold	New York Times	
1968	Television Reporting		NBC News, CBS News, ABC News	
1968	Magazine Reporting	Norman Mailer	Harper's Magazine	
1968	News Photography	Edward T. Adams	Associated Press	
1968	Criticism	John Simon	The New Leader	
1968	Book	Charles Rembar for The End of Obscenity		
1967	Foreign Reporting	R. W. Apple Jr.	New York Times	
1967	National Reporting	Clayton Fritchey	Newsday Specials	"for a syndicated Washington column"
1967	Local Reporting	J. Anthony Lukas	New York Times	
1967	Community Service		Newsday	
1967	Television Documentary		ABC News	for “Africa,” a four-hour overview of the continent
1967	Magazine Reporting		The Paris Review	
1967	News Photography	Catherine Leroy		
1967	Criticism	Saul Maloff	Newsweek	
1967	Book	Alan F. Westin for Privacy and Freedom	Atheneum	
1966	Foreign Reporting	Harrison E. Salisbury	New York Times	
1966	National Reporting	Richard Harwood	Washington Post	
1966	Local Reporting	Cal Olston	The Fargo Forum (North Dakota)	
1966	Interpretive Reporting	Murray Kempton	New York Post	
1966	Magazine Reporting		Ramparts	
1966	Criticism	Alfred Kazin		
1966	Book	Wilson Follett	Follett's Modern American Usage	
1966	News Photography	Horst Faas	Associated Press	
1966	Special Award	Arnold Gingrich	Esquire	
1966	Special Award	Time Essay	Time	
1965	Foreign Reporting	Dan Kurzman	Washington Post	
1965	Editorial Comment	John B. Oakes	New York Times	
1965	Metropolitan Reporting	Barry Gottehrer	New York Herald Tribune	
1965	Interpretive Reporting	Bernard B. Fall		
1965	Criticism	Susan Sontag	Partisan Review	
1965	Television Documentary	Beryl Fox	Canadian Broadcasting Corporation	The Mills of the Gods: Viet Nam
1965	News Photography	James A. Bourdier	Associated Press	
1965	Television News	Morley Safer	Columbia Broadcasting System	
1965	Caricature	David Levine	New York Review of Books	
1964	Foreign Reporting	Malcolm W. Browne	Associated Press	
1964	National Reporting	Paul Hope, John Barron	Washington Star	
1964	Metropolitan Reporting	A. M. Rosenthal	New York Times	
1964	Community Service	Samuel F. Marshall	Cleveland Plain Dealer	
1964	Criticism	Robert Brustein	New Republic	
1964	Radio Reporting	Edward P. Morgan	American Broadcasting Company	
1964	Television Reporting	Ted Yates	National Broadcasting Company	
1964	Special Award	Oron J. Hale		
1963	Foreign Reporting	David Halberstam	New York Times	
1963	National Reporting		American Broadcasting Company, Columbia Broadcasting System, National Broadcasting Company	
1963	Metropolitan Reporting	Norman C. Miller	Wall Street Journal	
1963	Magazine Reporting	Gilbert A. Harrison	New Republic	
1963	Criticism		New York Review of Books	
1963	News Photography	Roger Asnong	Associated Press	
1963	Special Award	A. H. Raskin	New York Times	
1963	Special Award		WNEW (radio)	
1963	Special Award	Peter Lyon		
1962	Foreign Reporting	Dana Adams Schmidt	New York Times	
1962	National Reporting	Mary McGrory	Washington Star	
1962	Local Reporting	Kitty Hanson	New York Daily News	
1962	Magazine Reporting	James Baldwin	New Yorker	
1962	Television Reporting		WNDT (Newark)	
1962	News Photography	Héctor Rondón Lovera	La Republica (Caracas)	
1962	Special Award	Michael Harrington	The Other America	
1962	Special Award	Morton Mintz	Washington Post	
1962	Special Award	Theodore E. Kruglak	The Two Faces of TASS	
1961	Foreign Reporting	Morris H. Rubin	The Progressive	
1961	National Reporting	Gerard Piel	Scientific American	
1961	Local Reporting	Laurence Stern	Washington Post	
1961	Radio & Television Reporting	Robert Young, Charles Dorkins	National Broadcasting Company	
1961	News Photography	Anonymous Photographer	Associated Press	
1961	Community Service	Arnold Brophy, Joseph S. Gelmis	Newsday	
1961	Special Award	Jules Feiffer		
1960	Foreign Reporting	James Morris	The Guardian (Manchester)	
1960	National Reporting	John T. Cunniff	Associated Press	
1960	Metropolitan Reporting	William R. Clark, Alexander Milch	Newark Evening News	
1960	Radio & Television Reporting	Albert Wasserman, Robert Young	National Broadcasting Company	
1960	News Photography	Yasushi Nagao	Mainichi Newspapers (Japan)	
1960	Community Service		Village Voice	
1960	Special Award	Douglass Carter	Reporter	
1959	Foreign reporting	A. M. Rosenthal	New York Times	
1959	National Reporting	Nathaniel Gerstenzang	New York Times	
1959	Metropolitan Reporting	William Haddad, Joseph Kahn	New York Post	
1959	Radio & Television Reporting	Av Westin, Howard K. Smith	Columbia Broadcasting System	
1959	Magazine Reporting		The Times Literary Supplement (London)	
1959	News Photography	Rangaswamy Satakopan	Associated Press	
1959	Special Award	Wilbur Schramm	Institute for Communication Research, Stanford University	
1958	Foreign Reporting	Chet Huntley, Reuven Frank	National Broadcasting Company	
1958	National Reporting	Richard L. Strout	Christian Science Monitor	
1958	Metropolitan Reporting	William Haddad	New York Post	
1958	Television Reporting	Gabe Pressman	WRCA-TV (New York)	
1958	Radio Reporting	Jay McMullen	Columbia Broadcasting System	
1958	Magazine Reporting	Marya Mannes	Reporter	
1958	News Photography	Paul Schutzer	Life	
1958	Community Service		Brooklyn Heights Press	
1958	Special Award	Justice William O. Douglas		
1958	Special Award	Samuel Blackman	Associated Press	
1958	Special Award	Walter Sullivan	New York Times	
1957	Foreign Reporting	Harrison E. Salisbury	New York Times	
1957	National Reporting	Relman Morin	Associated Press	
1957	Metropolitan Reporting	Mitchel Levitas	New York Post	
1957	Radio & Television Reporting		Columbia Broadcasting System	
1957	Magazine Reporting	Edmund Stevens, Phillip Harrington	Look	
1957	News Photography	Jack Jenkins	United Press Newspictures	
1957	Community Service	Edward Wakin	New York World-Telegram & Sun	
1957	Special Award	Richard D. Heffner	WRCA-TV (New York)	
1956	Foreign Reporting	Hal Lehrman		
1956	National Reporting	Jack Lotto	International News Service	
1956	Metropolitan Reporting	Phil Santora	New York Daily News	
1956	Suburban Reporting	Mel Elfin	Long Island Press	
1956	Radio & Television Reporting		Columbia Broadcasting System	
1956	News Photography	Jack Young	United Press Newspictures	
1956	Special Award	Emanuel R. Freedman	New York Times	
1956	Special Award	Endre Marton	Associated Press	
1956	Special Award	Ilona Nyilas	United Press	
1955	International Reporting	Thomas J. Hamilton	New York Times	
1955	Foreign Reporting	Barrett McGurn	New York Herald Tribune	
1955	National Reporting	Milton Mayer	The Reporter	
1955	Metropolitan Reporting	Fern Marja, Peter J. McElroy, William Dufty	New York Post	
1955	Suburban Reporting	Bob Greene	Newsday	
1955	Education Reporting	Gertrude Samuels	New York Times	
1955	Radio & Television Reporting		National Broadcasting Company	
1955	Magazine Reporting	William Attwood	Look	
1955	News Photography	William Sauro	United Press Newspictures	
1955	Community Service	Selwyn James and Robert Gorman	Redbook	
1954	International Reporting	Thomas J. Hamilton	New York Times	
1954	Foreign Reporting	George Weller	Chicago Daily News Syndicate	
1954	National Reporting	Luther Huston	New York Times	
1954	Metropolitan Reporting	James McGlincy, Sydney Mirkin	New York Daily News	
1954	Suburban Reporting	Thomas Finnegan	Long Island Star-Journal	
1954	Wire Service Reporting	Alan J. Gould, Don Whitehead, Saul Pett, Ben Price, Relman Morir, Jack Bell	Associated Press	
1954	Radio & Television Reporting	Eric Sevareid	Columbia Broadcasting System	
1954	Television Documentary	Henry Salomon Jr.	National Broadcasting Company	for “Three, Two, One, Zero,” a documentary on atomic power,
1954	News Photography	Maurice Johnson	International News Photos	
1954	Special Page	School Page	New York World-Telegram & Sun	
1954	Community Service		WNYC (New York)	
1954	Special Award	Dan Parker	New York Daily Mirror	
1954	Special Award	Leo Rosten	Look	
1953	Foreign Reporting	Jim Lucas	Scripps-Howard Newspapers	
1953	National Reporting	James Reston	New York Times	
1953	Metropolitan Reporting	William Longgood	New York World-Telegram & Sun	
1953	News Photography	Peter Stackpole	Life	
1953	Community Service		Newsday	
1953	Special Award	John Crosby	New York Herald Tribune	
1953	Special Award		Business Week	
1953	Special Award	Leonard Engel	freelance writer	
1952	Foreign Reporting	Marguerite Higgins	New York Herald Tribune	
1952	National Reporting	A. H. Raskin	New York Times	
1952	Metropolitan Reporting	Edward J. Mowery	New York World-Telegram & Sun	
1952	News Photography	Bob Wendlinger	New York Mirror	
1952	Community Service		Brooklyn Eagle	
1952	Special Award	Jack Gould	New York Times	
1952	Special Award		The Reporter	
1952	Special Award	Edward R. Murrow	Columbia Broadcasting System	
1952	Special Award		New York Daily News	
1951	Foreign Reporting	Milton Bracker, Virginia Lee Warren	New York Times	
1951	National Reporting	Jay Nelson Tuck	New York Post	
1951	Metropolitan Reporting	Richard Carter	New York Compass	
1951	Suburban Reporting		Yonkers Herald-Statesman	
1951	Education Reporting	Kalman Siegel	New York Times	
1951	Science Reporting	Alton Blakeslee	Associated Press	
1951	Religious Reporting	Ann Elizabeth Price	New York Herald Tribune	
1951	Sports Reporting	Ben Gould	Brooklyn Eagle	
1951	Community Service		New York World-Telegram & Sun	
1951	Special Award	Edward R. Murrow	Columbia Broadcasting System	
1951	Special Award		Sponsor	
1950	Foreign Reporting	Homer Bigart	New York Herald Tribune	
1950	National Reporting	Ira H. Freeman	New York Times	
1950	Metropolitan Reporting	Fern Marja	New York Post	
1950	Suburban Reporting		Long Island Daily Press	
1950	Wire Service Reporting	Don Whitehead	Associated Press	
1950	Education Reporting	Fred Hechinger, Judith Crist	New York Herald Tribune	
1950	Sports Reporting	Red Smith	New York Herald Tribune	
1950	Science Reporting	George Keaney	New York World-Telegram & Sun	
1950	Weekly Newspaper Reporting		New Canaan Advertiser (New Canaan, Connecticut)	
1950	Community Service		Newsday	
1950	Special Award	Straw Poll	New York Daily News	
1949	Foreign Reporting	Team of Six	New York Herald Tribune	
1949	National Reporting	Ted Poston	New York Post	
1949	Suburban Reporting	Fred Hechinger	Bridgeport Herald (Bridgeport, Connecticut)	
1949	Wire Service Reporting	Kingsbury Smith	International News Service	
1949	Education Reporting	Lester Grant	New York Herald Tribune	
1949	Science Reporting	William Laurence	New York Times	
1949	Radio Reporting	Don Hollenbeck	Columbia Broadcasting System	
1949	Community Service		Brooklyn Eagle	
1948	Foreign Reporting	Homer Bigart	New York Herald Tribune	
1948	Metropolitan Reporting	Malcolm Jonson	The Sun (New York)	
1948	Suburban Reporting	Larry Andrews	Nassau Review-Star	
1948	Education Reporting	Benjamin Fine	New York Times	
1948	Science Reporting	Albert Deutsch	PM Magazine	
1948	Community Service		Brooklyn Eagle	
