= Charlie Reed (journalist) =

American journalist and Yokota Bureau

Charlie M. Reed is an American journalist and former Yokota Bureau correspondent for Stars and Stripes.

She graduated from the University of Florida in 2001. She reported for Scripps Treasure Coast Newspapers and the Osceola News-Gazette, where she returned to stateside in 2014.

== Awards ==
- 2009 George Polk Award

== Works ==
- "Files prove Pentagon is profiling reporters", Stars and Stripes, Charlie Reed, Kevin Baron, Leo Shane III, August 27, 2009
- "Journalists' recent work examined before embeds", Stars and Stripes Charlie Reed, August 24, 2009
- "6-year-old’s birthday party inspires community outpouring after online post", The Osceola News-Gazette Charlie Reed, February 14, 2015

== Criticism ==
Reed and her colleagues' reporting - for which they won the 2009 George Polk Award for military reporting - was harshly criticized by former Stars and Stripes Ombudsman Mark Prendergast in a multiple part series.

- "Series on screening needed follow-up reporting", Stars and Stripes, MARK PRENDERGAST, Stars and Stripes ombudsman, February 12, 2010
- "Stories on media screening weak on sourcing", Stars and Stripes, MARK PRENDERGAST, Stars and Stripes ombudsman, February 23, 2010
- "When ‘secret’ may not mean secret", Stars and Stripes, MARK PRENDERGAST, Stars and Stripes ombudsman, March 17, 2010
