= F. Gilman Spencer =

American newspaper editor

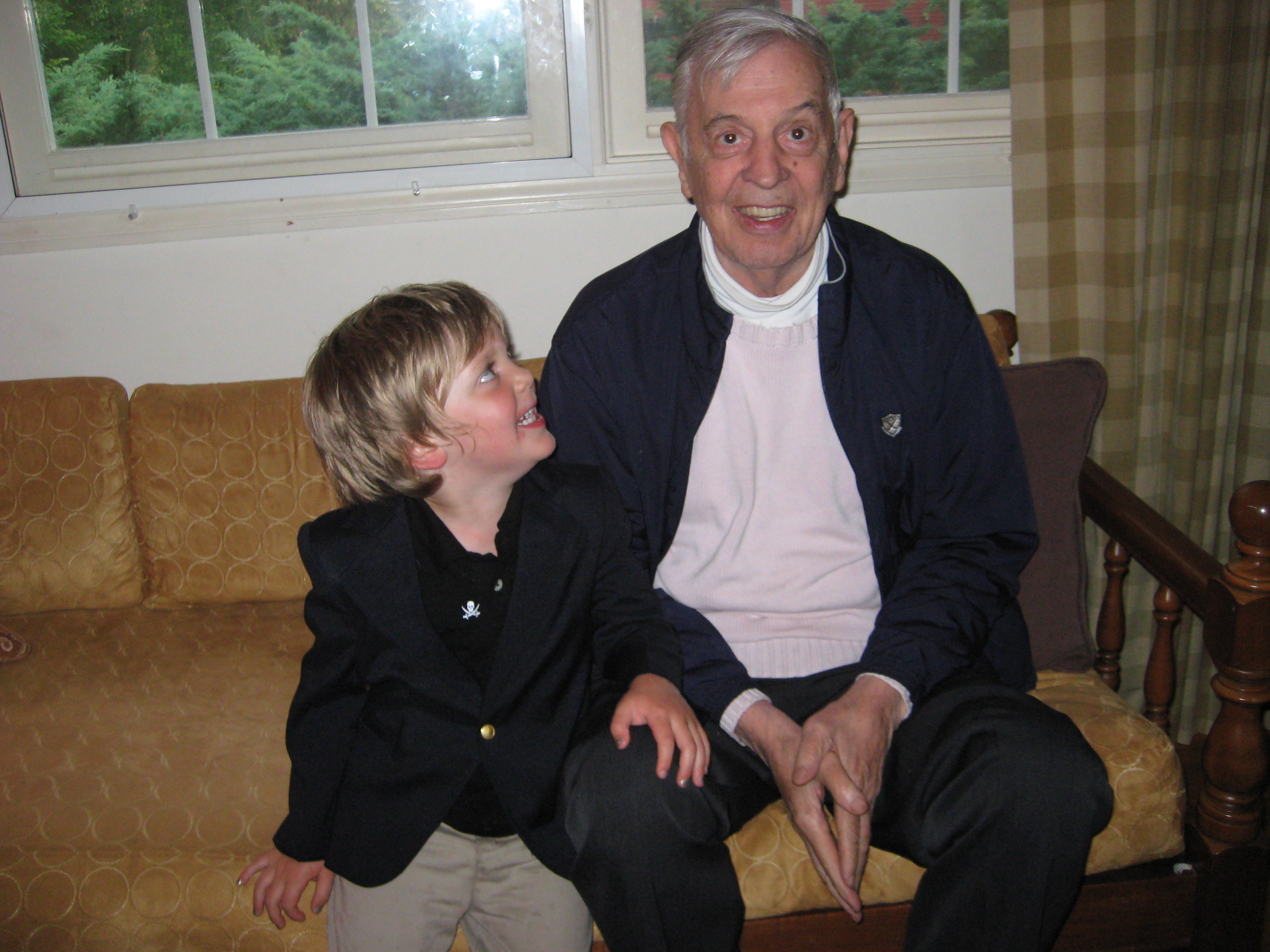
- Spencer (right) with his grandson (left), 2009
- Born: Frederick Gilman Spencer III; December 8, 1925
- Died: June 24, 2011 (aged 85); Manhattan
- Awards: 1974 Pulitzer Prize for Editorial Writing; 2003 George Polk Award

Frederick Gilman Spencer III (December 8, 1925 – June 24, 2011) was an American newspaper editor. He was editor at The Trentonian, Philadelphia Daily News from 1975 to 1984, New York Daily News from 1984 to 1989, and The Denver Post, from 1989 to 1993. "As an editor, Spencer gained a reputation for pulling struggling newspapers back from the brink and inspiring respect and loyalty among his staff. He guided the Philadelphia Daily News for nine years and then in 1984 moved to the New York Daily News, where he reveled in the tabloid wars."

Spencer lived in Manhattan with his wife, Isabel, until his death on June 24, 2011, aged 85.

== Awards ==
- 1974 Pulitzer Prize for Editorial Writing
- 2003 George Polk Award
