= Shai Oster =

American journalist

Shai Oster (Hebrew: שי אוסטר) is an American journalist and a former Asia bureau chief for The Information, a technology news site. He formerly worked at The Wall Street Journal and Bloomberg Businessweek.

== Early life and education ==
Oster was born in Jerusalem. He received his B.A. in history from Columbia University in 1994 and a master's degree in Journalism from the Columbia School of Journalism in 1998.

== Career ==
He has won several awards in more than a decade as a journalist in China, Europe, and the U.S., writing about a broad range of economic, business and social issues. Before joining The Wall Street Journal's China Bureau, Oster covered OPEC for Dow Jones Newswires in London. He previously served as Beijing bureau chief for Asiaweek magazine and as Beijing correspondent for the Bureau of National Affairs and the San Francisco Chronicle.

Shai was the recipient of the George Polk Award for environmental reporting and Asia Society's Osborn Elliott Award in 2008. In April 2007, he was awarded the Pulitzer Prize for International Reporting as part of the bureau’s "sharply edged reports on the adverse impact of China's booming capitalism on conditions ranging from inequality to pollution."

=== Three Gorges Dam reporting ===
Oster reported details regarding the environmental impact of the Three Gorges Dam on Chinese citizens living within affected areas along the banks of the Yangzee River including 1.4 million people forced to leave their homes by the government. Specifically, he noted that the Chinese government intended to displace a further 4 million people, a claim that sparked controversy, others claiming the resettlement plan was only tangentially related to the dam.

== Personal life ==
He lives in Hong Kong, China with his wife, Alisha Alexander. Oster speaks Hebrew, French, Mandarin Chinese and English.

== Awards ==
Oster has won numerous awards in the US, Europe and Asia for reporting across a broad spectrum of topics from Saudi Arabia's economic and energy issues to inequality and the elite in China. These are some of his more prominent honors.

- 2000 Phillips Foundation Journalism Fellow
- 2004 Dow Jones Newswires Award for Journalistic Excellence
- 2005 Business Journalist of the Year, UK
- 2005 OnLine Journalist of the Year, UK
- 2007 Pulitzer Prize for International Reporting
- 2007 George Polk Award for Environmental Reporting
- 2007 SOPA Awards for Excellence in Feature Writing
- 2008 Osborn Elliott Award for Excellence in Journalism, from The Asia Society
- 2008 The Scoop Award from SOPA
- 2008 Excellence in Public Service Award from SOPA
- 2008 12th Annual Human Rights Press Award
- 2009 SOPA Awards Excellence in Business Reporting
- 2011 Overseas Press Club of America Malcolm Forbes Award
- 2013 George Polk Award for Foreign Reporting
- 2013 Overseas Press Club of America Award for Investigative Reporting
- 2013 Osborn Elliott Award for Excellence in Journalism, from The Asia Society
