= Eric Nalder =

American journalist

- Education: University of Washington (BA)
- Occupation: Investigative journalist
- Writing career
- Notable awards: Pulitzer Prize for National Reporting (1990); Pulitzer Prize for Investigative Reporting (1997); George Polk Award (2008)

Eric Nalder is an American investigative journalist based in Seattle, Washington. He has won two Pulitzer Prizes.

Nalder graduated from the University of Washington, with a B.A. in 1968. He spent most of his early career with the Seattle Post-Intelligencer, one of two daily newspapers in Seattle, and was their chief investigative reporter. Nalder was named senior enterprise reporter for Hearst Newspapers in 2009.

Nalder and three colleagues with The Seattle Times shared the National Reporting Pulitzer in 1990 for their "coverage of the Exxon Valdez oil spill and its aftermath". At the same time he was personally an Explanatory Journalism Pulitzer finalist for "a revealing series about oil-tanker safety and the failure of industry and government to adequately oversee the shipping of oil."

Nalder and two Seattle Times colleagues won the Investigative Reporting Pulitzer in 1997 for "their investigation of widespread corruption and inequities in the federally sponsored housing program for Native Americans, which inspired much-needed reforms."

== Awards ==
- 2009 Excellence in Criminal Justice Reporting Awards
- 2008 George Polk Award
- 2001 Clarion Award Investigative Reporting
- 1997 Pulitzer Prize for Investigative Reporting
- 1996 "Excellence in Journalism" Investigative Reporting Award from Society of Professional Journalists
- 1993 Goldsmith Prize for Investigative Reporting
- 1990 Pulitzer Prize for National Reporting

== Books ==
- Tankers Full of Trouble: the perilous journey of Alaskan crude (Grove Press, 1994), ISBN 978-0-8021-1458-7
