= Daniel Hertzberg =

American journalist

Daniel Hertzberg (born February 3, 1946) is a former American journalist. Hertzberg is a 1968 graduate of the University of Chicago. He married Barbara Kantrowitz, on August 29, 1976. He was the former senior deputy managing editor and later deputy managing editor for international news at The Wall Street Journal. Starting in July 2009, Hertzberg served as senior editor-at-large and then as executive editor for finance at Bloomberg News in New York City before retiring in February 2014.

== Awards ==
- 1987 Winner (with James B. Stewart), Gerald Loeb Award for Deadline and/or Beat Writing for their coverage on an insider trading scandal on Wall Street
- 1987 Winner (with James B. Stewart), George Polk Award for Financial Reporting
- 1988 Winner (with James B. Stewart), Pulitzer Prize for Explanatory Journalism
- 1988 Winner Gerald Loeb Award for Large Newspapers for "stories about an investment banker charged with insider trading and the critical day that followed the October 19, 1987, stock market crash"
- 2008 Winner of the Gerald Loeb Award for Lifetime Achievement
- 2015 Winner of the Elliot V. Bell Award, for his significant contribution to the world of financial journalism during his career
