= Abrahm Lustgarten =

American investigative reporter, author, filmmaker and public speaker

- Education: B.S. Cornell University; M.A. Columbia University
- Occupation: Journalist
- Website: abrahm.com

Abrahm Lustgarten is an American investigative reporter, author, filmmaker and public speaker specializing in human adaptation to climate change, and an educator training journalists in cross-disciplinary communication about the climate crisis. He writes on staff for ProPublica and has worked with the New York Times Magazine.

== Career ==
Lustgarten was a staff writer at Fortune. He holds a master’s in journalism from Columbia University and a bachelor’s in anthropology from Cornell, and was a 2022 Emerson Collective Fellow at New America. He is the author of two previous books: “Run to Failure: BP and the Making of the Deepwater Horizon Disaster” and “China’s Great Train: Beijing’s Drive West and the Campaign to Remake Tibet.”

Lustgarten’s investigations include an examination of the global palm oil trade, the climate drivers of pandemics and BP’s Deepwater Horizon oil spill (which led to the Emmy-nominated “The Spill” with Frontline, a project he worked on). His 2015 series examining water scarcity in the American West, “Killing the Colorado,” was a finalist for the 2016 Pulitzer Prize for national reporting, received the top journalism honor from the National Academies of Sciences and was also the basis of the 2016 Discovery Channel film “Killing the Colorado,” which Lustgarten co-produced. His early investigation into fracking, starting in 2008, exposed one of the oil industry’s most dangerous legacies — its ongoing threat to America’s drinking water. The work received the George Polk award for environmental reporting, the National Press Foundation award for best energy writing and a Sigma Delta Chi award; it was a finalist for the Goldsmith Prize.

Lustgarten’s recent reporting focuses on global migration, demographic change and conflict in response to a warming climate. His 2022 investigation into how the International Monetary Fund and global finance institutions have kept Barbados and other climate-vulnerable nations paralyzed by high levels of debt led in part to the introduction of the Bridgetown Initiative, a global effort to reform climate finance for developing countries crafted by Barbadian Prime Minister Mia Mottley. In 2020 Lustgarten’s three-story cover series on a great climate-driven migration, published in partnership with the Times Magazine, helped prompt President Joe Biden’s formation of a climate migration study group and research report in the run-up to the COP26 conference in Glasgow, Scotland. That work became the focus of his 2024 book, "On The Move; The Overheating Earth and the Uprooting of America."

== Awards ==
- 2009 George Polk Award
- 2009 Goldsmith Prize finalist
- 2012 Sigma Delta Chi finalist, investigative reporting
- 2016 National Academies Keck Futures Award
- 2016 Pulitzer Prize finalist, National Reporting
- 2017 Nina Mason Pulliam Award for Outstanding Environmental Reporting
- 2021 Covering Climate Now award, best series, special issue
- 2021 National Association of Science Writers, Science in Society Award
- 2021 Oversees Press Club's Hal Boyle Award
- 2021 Nina Mason Pulliam Award for Outstanding Environmental Reporting
- 2023 Ted Scripps Award for Excellence in Environmental Reporting
- New York Times Book Review Editor's Choice for On The Move

== Works ==
- China's Great Train; Beijing's Drive West and the Campaign to Remake Tibet. Macmillan, 2008, ISBN 9780805083248
- Run to Failure: BP and the Making of the Deepwater Horizon Disaster, W. W. Norton, 2012, ISBN 978-0-393-08162-6
- On The Move; The Overheating Earth and the Uprooting of America, Farrar, Straus & Giroux, 2024, ISBN 978-0-37417173-5
