= Lisa Myers =

American journalist

- Born: Joplin, Missouri, U.S.
- Education: University of Missouri
- Occupation: Journalist
- Writing career
- Genre: Non-fiction

Lisa Myers (born Joplin, Missouri) is a retired American journalist. She was the senior investigative correspondent for NBC Nightly News.

A 1973 graduate of the University of Missouri's Missouri School of Journalism in Columbia, Missouri, she joined NBC in 1981. From 1979 to 1981, Myers was White House correspondent for The Washington Star. From 1977 to 1979, she was a Washington correspondent for the Chicago Sun-Times. She retired from NBC News after 33 years in early 2014.

She lives in Washington, D.C.

== Awards ==
- 2007 Gerald Loeb Award for Television Daily business journalism for "Trophy"
- 2006 George Polk Award
- 2005 Gracie Allen Individual Achievement Award as an Outstanding Correspondent
- 2004 Emmy Award for Business and Financial Reporting
- 2004 Clarion Award
- 2003 Joan Barone Award
