= Joe Stephens (journalist) =

American journalist

- Occupation: Journalist
- Notable credit(s): The Washington Post, Kansas City Star

Joe Stephens is an American journalist for The Washington Post, and holds the Ferris professorship in journalism at Princeton University. He is a native of Ohio and attended Miami University. He was an investigative projects reporter at The Kansas City Star before joining the Post in 1999.

== Notable investigations ==
Among Stephens most important investigative reporting series are pieces about The Nature Conservancy's business dealings and "The Body Hunters", about multinational pharmaceutical testing scandals in Nigeria.

In 2011, Stephens and his Post colleague Carol D. Leonnig revealed in a series of stories how the Obama administration pressed to approve a $535 million federal loan to Solyndra, a solar panel manufacturer whose leading investors were tied to a major Obama fundraiser.

== Academia ==
Stephens was a visiting 2012 Ferris Professor of Journalism at Princeton University. He was appointed to the Ferris professorship in residence at Princeton in 2014 In 2018, he helped found Princeton's first formal Program in Journalism, and became its inaugural director.

== Awards ==
Stephens has won more than a dozen national honors, including three George Polk Awards: the 1998 Polk Award for Legal Reporting (while at the Star), the 1994 Polk Award for Political Reporting (also with The Kansas City Star) and the 2005 Foreign Reporting Award with David B. Ottaway (while at The Washington Post). According to The Washington Post, Stephens has written three series that were Pulitzer Prize finalists. Stephens has won top awards from the Overseas Press Club, the Society of Professional Journalists and Investigative Reporters and Editors, among others. He shared the 2004 Gerald Loeb Award for Large Newspapers with David B. Ottaway. With The Washington Post colleague Lena H. Sun, Stephens was a 2010 finalist for the Goldsmith Prize for Investigative Reporting for their "Death on the Rails" series. Stephens had been a finalist twice before. He shared in an Edward R. Murrow Award for investigative TV reporting out of Afghanistan.

Stephens has been a judge or juror for many journalism awards, including the Pulitzer Prize. He is a director of the Fund for Investigative Journalism.
