= Jesse A. Hamilton =

American journalist

Jesse A. Hamilton (born 1974 Portland, Oregon) is an American journalist covering the government response to the rise of cryptocurrencies as deputy managing editor at CoinDesk. He was previously a reporter at Bloomberg L.P. in Washington, D.C.

== Life ==
He graduated from Western Washington University with a B.A. and worked for newspapers around Washington state, most recently the Yakima Herald-Republic. He worked from 2002 to 2009 at the Hartford Courant, including several years as its military reporter, during which he spent time as a correspondent in Iraq. He then became the Courant's Washington Bureau Chief, tracking the 2008 presidential election and working in the press corps on Capitol Hill.

He then wrote about the Obama administration effort to reform health care and the U.S. financial sector as Washington Bureau Manager of BestWeek, published by A. M. Best. In 2010, he joined the Washington staff of Bloomberg News, covering the U.S. Securities and Exchange Commission.

Hamilton has also written on the economy for National Journal magazine.

He is married and lives in the Washington, D.C. area.

== Awards ==
- 2001 George Polk Award
- 2001 Investigative Reporters and Editors Award
- 2001 Society of Professional Journalists Sigma Delta Chi Award for Feature Reporting
- 2007 Michael Kelly award finalist
