= South Africa Now =

American public television newsmagazine

South Africa Now was an American public television newsmagazine which covered South Africa under Apartheid. It was produced by Globalvision. As of 1990, it was being carried by 80 PBS stations, CNN's World Report, the Vision Network, CBC Newsworld in Canada, NHK in Japan, JBC in Jamaica, ZNS in the Bahamas, CBC in Barbados, Televisão de Moçambique, ZNBC TV and ZBC TV in Zimbabwe.

In 1991, the program won a George Polk Award for "defying censors to report on the country's turbulence and violence against its black majority."
