= Osceola News-Gazette =

American weekly newspaper

- Type: Weekly newspaper
- Owner(s): Stidham Media Group Holdings, LLC
- Publisher: Rochelle Stidham
- Editor: Ken Jackson
- Managing editor: Toni Rowan
- Language: English
- Headquarters: 222 Church Street, Kissimmee Florida
- Circulation: 33,250 Thursday
- ISSN: 1060-1244
- Website: Official website

The Osceola News-Gazette is a weekly newspaper based in Osceola County, Florida. Its print version is published on Thursdays out of its main editorial office in Kissimmee. Its website (AroundOsceola.com) was overhauled in August 2019. The publication's focus is on the county's government, schools and high school sports teams as well as features on local residents.

From 2022-26 the News-Gazette earned nearly 45 award nominations and 12 first-place awards, including five in 2026, for reporting, design, website makeup and overall general excellence, at the annual Florida Press Association awards banquet.
