= Dana Adams Schmidt =

American journalist

Dana Adams Schmidt (September 6, 1915 - August 25, 1994) was an American journalist. From 1943 to 1972, he was a correspondent for The New York Times covering Europe, North Africa and the Middle East. In 1963, he won the George Polk Award for "the best reporting requiring exceptional courage and enterprise abroad" for a series on Kurdish rebels in Iraq.

== Books ==
- Anatomy of a Satellite
- Journey Among Brave Men
- Yemen: The Unknown War
- Armageddon in the Middle East
