= Andrew Wolfson =

English cricketer

Personal information
- Full name: Andrew Cecil Wolfson
- Born: 1 May 1890; Santa Cruz, Canary Islands, Spain
- Died: 26 July 1978 (aged 88); Forest Row, Sussex, England
- Batting: Unknown
- Bowling: Right-arm medium

Career statistics
Competition	First-class
Matches	2
Runs scored	14
Batting average	14.00
100s/50s	0/0
Top score	8
Balls bowled	76
Wickets	2
Bowling average	26.50
5 wickets in innings	0
10 wickets in match	0
Best bowling	1/4
Catches/stumpings	0/–
- Source: Cricinfo, 25 July 2019

Andrew Cecil Wolfson (1 May 1890 – 26 July 1978) was an English first-class cricketer.

Wolfson was the son of the Russian-born Henry Wolfson, who emigrated to England before making a fortune cultivating potatoes and tomatoes in the Canary Islands. He was educated in England at Marlborough College. He later made two appearances in first-class cricket for H. D. G. Leveson Gower's XI in 1920, against Cambridge University and Oxford University at Eastbourne. He scored 14 runs in his two matches, as well as taking 2 wickets with his right-arm medium pace. Wolfson died in July 1978 at Forest Row, Sussex.
