= David McLemore =

American tubist (born 1987)

David McLemore (born February 22, 1987) is an American tubist and Instructor of tuba and euphonium at Central Washington University in Ellensburg, Washington.

McLemore studied with David Zerkel at the University of Georgia (2011–2014) where he obtained a Doctor of Musical Arts degree in tuba performance. He was also a recipient of the prestigious UGA Presidential Fellowship. Before attending UGA, McLemore earned two Masters of Music degrees in performance (tuba and chamber music) from the University of Michigan (2009–2011), where he studied with Fritz Kaenzig. He also earned a Bachelors of Music degree in tuba performance at the University of Southern California, studying with Jim Self and Norman Pearson.

== Professional career ==
McLemore has been an instructor of tuba and euphonium at Central Washington University since Fall of 2015. Since March 2016, he has performed as Principal Tubist with the Yakima Symphony Orchestra.

McLemore has previously performed as tubist with the Valdosta Symphony Orchestra (Georgia), Macon Symphony Orchestra (Georgia), and Georgia Symphony Orchestra. He has performed with numerous chamber ensembles, including the University of Georgia Graduate Tuba-Euphonium Quartet, Classic V brass quintet (Georgia), Pine Lake brass quintet (Georgia), and the University of Michigan Contemporary Directions Ensemble. From 2009 to 2011, he served as a low brass mentor with the Detroit Symphony Orchestra's Civic Youth Ensembles program, acting as principal tubist of the DSO Civic Orchestra. In 2012 and again in 2014, Dr. McLemore performed at the International Tuba-Euphonium Conference as a soloist. Other soloist or clinician opportunities McLemore has had include: United States Army Band Tuba-Euphonium Workshop (2013), Southeast Regional Tuba-Euphonium Conference (2013 and 2015), and the Midwest Regional Tuba-Euphonium Conference (2015).

== Awards won ==
McLemore has competed as a soloist at numerous national and international competitions. In 2011 he was one of five finalists in the WAMSO Young Artist Competition, winning a scholarship to attend the 2011 Aspen Music Festival. In 2010 he won 1st prize Artist Tuba in the International Tuba-Euphonium Conference solo competition. In 2012 he won 1st prize Artist Tuba in the Leonard Falcone International Tuba-Euphonium Festival solo competition. In 2012 he also won 1st prize Brass in that year's MTNA National solo competition. In 2014 Dr. McLemore won 1st prize tuba, 3rd prize euphonium, and the Grand prize (on tuba) in the International Women's Brass Conference solo competitions. He also won 3rd prize tuba at the 2014 Jeju International Brass Competition in Jeju, South Korea.
