= Frances Robles =

American journalist

Frances Robles is an American journalist on the international desk for The New York Times. Robles contributed to two team Pulitzer Prizes while at the Miami Herald and was a member of three teams that were finalists for the prestigious prize. In 2021 she shared a George Polk Award at the Times for foreign reporting, on the murder of Haitian president Jovenel Moïse. She also won a Polk Award for for her coverage of Louis Scarcella, a Brooklyn homicide detective who used shady methods to convict defendants. (More than a dozen murder convictions were overturned in the wake of her coverage.) In 2015 she was elected to the hall of fame of the National Association of Hispanic Journalists and in 2024 she won Columbia University's Cabot Gold Medal from the Maria Moors Cabot Prizes. At the Times, Robles served on the NewsGuild bargaining committee.

== Education and career ==
Robles studied at New York University, working as a "copy girl" for The New York Times at night. In 2005 she had a Knight fellowship at Stanford University.

Robles worked at the Cleveland Plain Dealer, then the Miami Herald for 19 years. At the Herald her roles included education, police and courts reporter; Managua and Bogotá bureau chief; Cuba reporter; and finally, enterprise writer. She joined the Times in 2013. She worked on the national desk before joining the international desk in July 2024, and serves on the NewsGuild bargaining committee.

== Honors ==
Robles shared in two Pulitzer Prizes at the Miami Herald (in 1999 for investigative reporting on voter fraud and in 2001 for breaking news on the Elián González raid), and a 2021 George Polk Award for foreign reporting, on the murder of Haitian president Jovenel Moïse. In 2024 the Maria Moors Cabot Prizes awarded Robles a Cabot Gold Medal, citing her "authoritative voice in the Americas, telling us unique, historically significant and insightful stories" and "her moving and laser-focused illumination of the region’s crises and occasional triumphs." In 2015 she was elected to the hall of fame of the National Association of Hispanic Journalists.

== Personal life ==
Robles is based in Florida. Her sister was Carol Robles-Román, a lawyer and deputy mayor of New York City.
