= Martin Gottlieb =

American journalist and newspaper editor (born 1948)

- Born: January 10, 1948 (age 77); Brooklyn, New York
- Occupation: Editor
- Notable credit(s): The Record (Bergen County),The New York Times, Daily News (New York)

Martin Gottlieb is an American journalist and newspaper editor for the publication The City who has been the assistant managing editor/investigations for Newsday since 2016. From 2012 to 2016, he was editor of The Record of Bergen County, New Jersey, where he began his career as a newspaper journalist in 1971. During his tenure at The Record, the paper broke the story of the George Washington Bridge Scandal.

Previously, from 2008 to 2011, Gottlieb was the global editions editor of The New York Times; in this capacity, he oversaw production of the International Herald Tribune. He first joined The Times as a metro reporter in 1983, covering topics such as Donald Trump's Television City project, Harry Macklowe's demolition of four buildings on West 44th Street without a permit, and the redevelopment of Times Square.

Gottlieb has also served as associate managing editor, deputy culture editor, and national project editor of The New York Times, managing editor of the New York Daily News, and editor-in-chief of The Village Voice. In 1971, he also spent three months on the "lobster shift" (late evening to early morning) at the New York Post.

== Education ==
Gottlieb received his bachelor's degree from Queens College and a master's degree from Columbia University Graduate School of Journalism. He received a Loeb Fellowship from the Harvard University Graduate School of Design in 1979.

He has taught journalism at the Columbia University Graduate School of Journalism and at NYU. In 2008, Gottlieb was the James H. Ottoway Professor of Journalism at SUNY New Paltz and, in 2009, he was a Princeton University Council of Humanities Professor of Journalism.

== Awards and honors ==
Gottlieb has been nominated for several Pulitzer Prizes, including one for The Record's work on the heroin epidemic in northern New Jersey and one for the paper's coverage of the George Washington Bridge Scandal, and has also served as a jurist for the Pulitzer Prizes. The International Herald Tribune won "La Une" from the French Publishers Association under his leadership, the only time the award has been given to a non-French language paper.

He won the George Polk Award for investigative journalism, in recognition of a New York Times series on allegation of corruption at the Columbia/HCA Hospital Corp., which was the largest hospital chain in the country. In 2019, he was one of four recipients of the Columbia Journalism School Alumni Awards.
