= Luke Mogelson =

American journalist

- Education: Bennington College
- Occupation: Journalist
- Writing career
- Genre: War reporting
- Notable awards: George Polk Award; National Magazine Award; Livingston Award

Luke Mogelson is an American journalist. He has contributed to The New Yorker and New York Times Magazine, covering the wars in Ukraine, Afghanistan, Syria, and Iraq, as well as Minneapolis after the murder of George Floyd and the January 6th attack on the Capitol.

== Biography ==
Mogelson was born in St. Louis. He graduated from Bennington College in 2005. He was a contributing writer for the New York Times magazine, reporting from Kabul, Afghanistan, from 2011 to 2014. He then moved to The New Yorker in 2013, where he has reported from Ukraine and Syria, and on domestic affairs in the United States.

== Achievements and honors ==
Mogelson won a Livingston Award in 2013, a National Magazine Award in 2014, and his work has been supported by the Pulitzer Center on Crisis Reporting. In 2021, he received a George Polk Award for his coverage of protests and racial politics in the United States.

== Works ==
Mogelson is the author of The Storm is Here: An American Crucible and These Heroic, Happy Dead, a book of short stories.

The Storm is Here

Mogelson's first book, The Storm is Here: An American Crucible, was published September 13, 2022, by Penguin Random House. The book describes the social discord in the United States through a series of eye-witness accounts following the distress created by COVID-19, economic uncertainty, and the clash of political and race relations within the US post-2016.

== Bibliography ==
- Mogelson, Luke (2016). These heroic, happy dead : stories. New York: Tim Duggan Books.
- — (January 25, 2021). "The storm : in the weeks before the assault on the Capitol, the President and his supporters kept stoking paranoia and rage". A Reporter at Large. The New Yorker. 96 (45): 32–53. (Note: Online version is titled "Among the insurrectionists".)
- — (2022). The storm is here : an American crucible. New York: Penguin Press.

———————
