= Angus Hines =

American television producer

- Occupation: Television producer
- Employer: ABC News
- Awards: George Polk Award (2007)

Angus Hines is an American television producer for ABC News.

== Awards ==
- 2007 George Polk Award
- 2007 Citation Overseas Press Club
