= Kathy Chu =

Kathy Chu is a former Asia corporate reporter for The Wall Street Journal, and a former personal finance and consumer banking reporter for both the Wall Street Journal and USA Today. An article in USA Today commemorating the paper's 40th anniversary in 2022 noted Chu's 2008 work as one of the 40 highlights of the paper's existence. Most recently, Chu wrote about the crypto world and hosted broadcasts with some of the space's most colorful characters, from Tron Founder Justin Sun to "Crypto Dad" Chris Giancarlo and "Crypto Mom" Hester Peirce.

Chu graduated from University of California, Berkeley, with a Bachelor of Arts, and from Columbia University with a masters of science in journalism. She has also written for Newsday.

== Awards ==
- 2016 Online News Association award for “2050 Demographics” team coverage.
- 2016 APME Innovation in Journalism Awards, part of “2050 Demographics” team coverage.
- 2015 Sigma Delta Chi Award, Non Deadline reporting, for “2050 Demographics” series.
- 2015 New York Press Club, Special Event Reporting, Alibaba coverage.
- 2014 SABEW award finalist, team tech coverage of Alibaba.
- 2010 Award for Excellence in Economic Journalism
- 2009 George Polk Award
- 2009, 2004 Front Page Award, Newswomen's Club of New York
- 2009 Excellence in Financial Journalism Award, NYSSCPA
- 2010 Deadline Club Award beat reporting
- 2008 New York Press Club Award
- 2008 Clarion Award, Association for Women in Communications

== Works ==
- The Busy Family's Guide to Money, Nolo, 2008, ISBN 978-1-4133-0836-5
