= Joseph N. Shapiro =

Russian urologist and pioneer of urologic oncology

Joseph N. Shapiro (or Iosif Naumovich Shapiro. Belarusian: Іосіф Навумавіч Шапіра; Russian: Иосиф Наумович Шапиро; 1887 in Minsk – 1961 in Leningrad) was a urologist, military doctor, lecturer and one of the founders of urologic oncology in Russia.

== Early life ==
Shapiro was born in Minsk, Belarus (1887). Because of the prescribed quota for Jewish students in Russian universities, he entered the Medical Faculty of the Ludwig-Maximilians-Universität München in 1908 and graduated in 1918 with honors as a Doctor of Medicine. In 1915, he passed the state examination for the title of Physician at the medical faculty of Moscow University.

From 1914 to 1917, he worked as an intern in the Urology Department of the "Union of Cities" Infirmary 144; at the same time he also worked as the head of the surgical department of 36th hospital; and as an intern in the urological department in Obukhov Hospital in Saint Petersburg, under Professor B .N. Holtz. Professor B.N. Holtz drew him to the teaching of urology as a freelance assistant (1925), and further (1930) as a Privatdozent.

== Career ==
In 1928, Shapiro created the urology department with 60 beds in the Mechnikov Hospital in Saint Petersburg.

In 1934, under his leadership, a Department of Urology was created in the 2nd Medical Institute in Saint Petersburg (then Leningrad). Beginning in 1935, Shapiro served as Head of the Department of Urology at the LenGIDUV (Leningrad Institute for Advanced Medical Education). In the pre-war years (1936–1939) the number of patients in his clinic in LenGIDUV reached 120. It was the largest urology department in the USSR. In 1938, he produced a monograph "Tumors of the urinary bladder", which was a handbook for surgeons, oncologists, and urologists.

During Winter War (1939–1940) Shapiro was Senior Consultant Urologist for evacuation hospitals of Leningrad. Upon the German invasion of Soviet Union (1941) he became a consultant urologist at the Northern Front, and from 1942 to 1945 a chief urologist for evacuation hospitals of the People's Commissariat for Health. His report "Gunshot wounds of the urinary and genital system" at the 1941 All-Union conference of surgeons was well regarded. Thanks to his work as the organizer of the stage treatment of urological wounds, 61% of the victims had their health restored and returned to duty.

In 1946, J. N. Shapiro opened the urology department with 50 beds in the Uricky Hospital in Leningrad and worked during the first year as head of the department.

From 1958 until his death, he was Head of the Urologic Oncology Department in the Uricky Hospital.

He died in 1961 and was buried in the Preobrazhenskoe Jewish Cemetery in Saint Petersburg.
