= Allan Maraynes =

American journalist

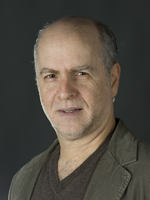
- Born: Brooklyn, New York, U.S.
- Education: Bachelor’s degree in Mass Communications and Theatre from Queens College
- Occupations: Documentary Filmmaker, Investigative Journalist, Television Producer, Writer-Director
- Years active: 1974–present

Allan Lawrence Maraynes is an American documentary filmmaker, investigative journalist, television producer, and writer. He is best known for his award-winning work on CBS's 60 Minutes, ABC's 20/20, and Dateline NBC.

== Education ==
Maraynes graduated from Queens College in 1972 with a bachelor's degree in Mass Communications and Theatre, and in 1974 earned a Master's in Film and Television from Loyola University (now the Loyola Marymount University School of Film and Television).

== Professional career ==
Maraynes began his career in 1974 at CBS News where he soon landed at 60 Minutes, spending the better part of a decade working as a producer alongside famed correspondents, Mike Wallace and Ed Bradley. He generated major investigations, including a report into fuel tank hazards of the Ford Pinto, and produced nearly thirty segments, spanning everything from Who Killed Malcolm X to profiles of notable cultural figures like Robin Williams and George Steinbrenner.

After 60 Minutes he was co-executive producer of an ABC Entertainment pilot "SST". Maraynes then spent several years at ABC's 20/20, where he served as both producer and senior investigative producer, generating investigations into many pressing social issues, such as hotel security, the state of the mentally ill in prisons, and crime in nursing homes.

In 1996 he joined Dateline NBC as a senior investigative producer. Among the stories he originated and/or supervised are investigations into airport security lapses (five years before the attacks of September 11, 2001), a hidden camera investigation into corruption in the ranks of some Louisiana police officers, and investigations into child labor in American agriculture and the Indian silk business. Maraynes also played a major role in the creation, design, writing, and success of several internal Dateline franchises, including the long-running series, "To Catch a Predator". Most recently, he originated and supervised a Peabody Award-winning hour (as part of NBC News' In Plain Sight initiative): "Breathless", which exposed the national epidemic of childhood asthma and its link to poverty.

Maraynes has guest lectured at the New School in New York, New York University, the Columbia University School of Journalism, and Tufts University.

He is currently the president of Row M Productions which develops feature film and feature documentary projects.

== Awards and honors ==
George Foster Peabody Award
- In Plain Sight "Breathless" 2013 (NBC NEWS)
- The Paper Chase (2000) (NBC-DATELINE)
- Children's Express (1989) (PBS)

Alfred I. Dupont Award

- Devastation in Oklahoma (2014-NBC NEWS)
- The Paper Chase (2000) (NBC-DATELINE)

Overseas Press Club

- Slaves To Fashion (2002) (NBC-DATELINE)
- Trial and Error (2012) (NBC-DATELINE)

George Polk Award

- The Paper Chase (1999) (NBC-DATELINE)

Emmy

- Killer Wheels (1981) (CBS 60 Minutes)
- Schizophrenia (1985) (CBS 60 Minutes)
- Children's Express (1988) (PBS)
- Why Are They Here? (1991) (ABC-20/20)
- Last Man Out (1993) (ABC-20/20)
- The Predators (1995) (ABC-20/20)
- The Price Is Wrong (1997) (NBC-DATELINE)
- Probable Cause (1997) (NBC-DATELINE)
- Children of the Harvest (1998) (NBC-DATELINE)
- Slaves To Fashion (2002) (NBC-DATELINE)
- First Do No Harm (2003) (NBC-DATELINE)
- Tricks of the Trade (2003) (NBC-DATELINE)
- Children For Sale (2004) (NBC-DATELINE)
- Children For Sale (2004) (NBC-DATELINE)
- Children of War (2005) (NBC-DATELINE)
- Bitter Pills (2006) (NBC-DATELINE)

Sigma Delta Chi Award

- Breathless (2014) (NBC-DATELINE)

Gerald Loeb Award

- The Paper Chase (1999) (NBC-DATELINE)

Investigative Reporters and Editors Awards

- Bitter Pills (2006) (NBC-DATELINE)
- The Paper Chase (1999) (NBC-DATELINE)
- Probable Cause (1996) (NBC-DATELINE)

Edward R. Murrow Award (R.T.N.D.A.)

- 1996 – Investigative Reporting
- 1998 – Investigative Reporting (Paper Chase) (NBC)
- 1999 – Investigative Reporting (NYPD Blues)(NBC)
- 2001 – Investigative Reporting (Paper Chase) (NBC)
- 2004 – Investigative Reporting (Sulzer Hip Implants) (NBC)
- 2007 – Investigative Reporting (Bitter Pills) (NBC)
- 2008 – Investigative Reporting (To Save The Children)(NBC)

The Gracie Award (Alliance for Women In Media)

- Hotel Insecurity (2005) (NBC-DATELINE)
