= 2024 Pulitzer Prize =

Awards for journalism and related fields

The 2024 Pulitzer Prizes were awarded by the Pulitzer Prize Board for work during the 2023 calendar year on May 6, 2024.

== Prizes ==
Winners and finalists for the prizes are listed below, with the winners marked in bold.

=== Journalism ===
Public Service
**ProPublica**, for the work of Joshua Kaplan, Justin Elliott, Brett Murphy, Alex Mierjeski and Kirsten Berg, for "groundbreaking and ambitious reporting that pierced the thick wall of secrecy surrounding the Supreme Court to reveal how a small group of politically influential billionaires wooed justices with lavish gifts and travel, pushing the Court to adopt its first code of conduct."
KFF Health News and Cox Media Group, "for uncovering millions of cases in which the Social Security Administration overpaid beneficiaries, then demanded immediate repayment — imposing debts on elderly and disabled people who had already spent the funds."
The Washington Post, "for its sobering examination of the AR-15 semi-automatic rifle, which forced readers to reckon with the horrors wrought by the weapon often used for mass shootings in America."

Breaking News Reporting
**Staff of Lookout Santa Cruz, California**, "for its detailed and nimble community-focused coverage, over a holiday weekend, of catastrophic flooding and mudslides that displaced thousands of residents and destroyed more than 1,000 homes and businesses."
Staff of the Honolulu Civil Beat, "for its distinctive, sweeping and urgent coverage of the Maui wildfires that killed more than 100 people and left a historic town in ruins, reporting that held officials to account and chronicled the aftermath and efforts to rebuild."
Staff of the Los Angeles Times, "for urgent and thoughtful coverage of a Lunar New Year overnight shooting that left 11 senior citizens dead, demonstrating clear knowledge of and commitment to the local Asian communities."

Investigative Reporting
**Hannah Dreier of The New York Times**, "for a deeply reported series of stories revealing the stunning reach of migrant child labor across the United States—and the corporate and governmental failures that perpetuate it."
Casey Ross and Bob Herman of STAT, "for exposing how UnitedHealth Group, the nation's largest health insurer, used an unregulated algorithm to override clinicians' judgments and deny care, highlighting the dangers of AI use in medicine."
Staff of Bloomberg, "for a deep and rigorous investigation of how the US government aided the global spread of gun violence, prompting the Biden administration to halt most gun exports for 90 days while it reviewed the federal government's marketing relationship with gun manufacturers."

Explanatory Reporting
**Sarah Stillman of The New Yorker**, "for a searing indictment of our legal system’s reliance on the felony murder charge and its disparate consequences, often devastating for communities of color."
Staff of Bloomberg, "for rigorous, far-reaching reporting that holds corporate water profiteers to account and exposes how they willfully exacerbate the effects of climate change at the expense of less powerful communities."
Staffs of The Texas Tribune, ProPublica, and FRONTLINE, "for advancing understanding of law enforcement’s catastrophic response to the mass shooting at a Uvalde, Texas elementary school and also for documenting the political and policy shortcomings that have led to similar deadly police failures across the country."

Local Reporting
**Sarah Conway of City Bureau and Trina Reynolds-Tyler of the Invisible Institute**, "for their investigative series on missing Black girls and women in Chicago that revealed how systemic racism and police department neglect contributed to the crisis."
Jerry Mitchell, Ilyssa Daly, Brian Howey and Nate Rosenfield of Mississippi Today and The New York Times, "for their detailed examination of corruption and abuse, including the torturing of suspects, by Mississippi sheriffs and their officers over two decades."
Staff of The Villages Daily Sun, "for its comprehensive investigation and moment-by-moment account of Florida officials’ inaction before, during and after Hurricane Ian, the deadliest storm to strike the state since 1935."

National Reporting
**Staff of Reuters**, "for an eye-opening series of accountability stories focused on Elon Musk’s automobile and aerospace businesses, stories that displayed remarkable breadth and depth and provoked official probes of his companies’ practices in Europe and the United States."

**Staff of The Washington Post**, "for its sobering examination of the AR-15 semi-automatic rifle, which forced readers to reckon with the horrors wrought by the weapon often used for mass shootings in America."

Bianca Vázquez Toness and Sharon Lurye of the Associated Press, "for a deeply reported series on the corrosive effect of the pandemic on public education, highlighting the staggering number of students missing from classrooms across America."
Dave Philipps of The New York Times, "for groundbreaking reporting that uncovered a pattern of traumatic brain injuries among U.S. troops from blast exposures caused by the weapons they were firing."

International Reporting
**Staff of The New York Times**, "for its wide-ranging and revelatory coverage of Hamas’ lethal attack in southern Israel on October 7, Israel's intelligence failures and the Israeli military's sweeping, deadly response in Gaza."
Julie Turkewitz and Federico Rios of The New York Times, "for their immersive and ambitious coverage of "migration purgatory" in the Darién Gap between Colombia and Panama."
Staff of The Washington Post, "for a sweeping on-the-ground investigation in India that exposed the methodical undermining of the world’s largest democracy by Narendra Modi and his Hindu nationalist allies, who have deployed social media to foment hate and pressure American tech giants to bend to government power."

Feature Writing
**Katie Engelhart, contributing writer, The New York Times**, "for her fair-minded portrait of a family’s legal and emotional struggles during a matriarch’s progressive dementia that sensitively probes the mystery of a person’s essential self."
Jennifer Senior of The Atlantic, "for her exquisitely rendered account of her disabled aunt, who was institutionalized as a small child, and the lasting effects on her family, told in the context of present-day care and intervention that make different outcomes possible."
Keri Blakinger of The Marshall Project, "for her insightful, humane portrait, reported with great difficulty, of men on Death Row in Texas who play clandestine games of “Dungeons & Dragons,” countering their extreme isolation with elaborate fantasy. (Co-published with The New York Times Magazine.)"

Commentary
**Vladimir Kara-Murza, contributor, The Washington Post**, "for passionate columns written under great personal risk from his prison cell, warning of the consequences of dissent in Vladimir Putin's Russia and insisting on a democratic future for his country."
Brian Lyman of the Alabama Reflector, "for brave, clear and pointed columns that challenge ever-more-repressive state policies flouting democratic norms and targeting vulnerable populations, written with the command and authority of a veteran political observer."
Jay Caspian Kang of The New Yorker, "for original columns that force us to reexamine popular narratives and reframe such critical topics as affirmative action, racial politics and the portrayal of gun violence."

Criticism
**Justin Chang of the Los Angeles Times**, "for richly evocative and genre-spanning film criticism that reflects on the contemporary moviegoing experience."
Vinson Cunningham of The New Yorker, "for theater reviews that reflect a formidable knowledge of the stage and the mechanics of performance along with canny observations on the human condition."
Zadie Smith, contributor, The New York Review of Books, "for a review of the film “Tár” that addressed with wit and ease such consequential themes as mortality and the clash of generations."

Editorial Writing
**David E. Hoffman of The Washington Post**, "for a compelling and well-researched series on new technologies and the tactics authoritarian regimes use to repress dissent in the digital age, and how they can be fought."
Brandon McGinley and Rebecca Spiess of the Pittsburgh Post-Gazette, "for ambitious, investigative editorials that examine a collapse in services for the homeless in Pittsburgh, and the city’s failure to account for millions of dollars meant to offer relief."
Isadora Rangel of the Miami Herald, "for a scathing series that roots the city’s multiple political scandals in a troubled local democracy and champions electoral reforms."

Illustrated Reporting and Commentary
**Medar de la Cruz, contributor, The New Yorker**, "for his visually-driven story set inside Rikers Island jail using bold black-and-white images that humanize the prisoners and staff through their hunger for books."
Angie Wang, contributor, The New Yorker, "for a vivid illustrated journey with her toddler that explains how human language learning can never be supplanted by AI."
Claire Healy, Nicole Dungca and Ren Galeno, contributor, of The Washington Post, "for masterful and sensitive use of the comic form to reveal the story of a great injustice to a group of Filipinos exhibited at the 1904 World’s Fair in St. Louis, where some of them died."
Clay Bennett of the Chattanooga Times Free Press, "for a portfolio of deceptively gentle, mostly wordless cartoons full of juxtapositions that ably communicate complex, sophisticated messages."

Breaking News Photography
**Photography Staff of Reuters**, "for raw and urgent photographs documenting the October 7th deadly attack in Israel by Hamas and the first weeks of Israel’s devastating assault on Gaza."
Adem Altan of Agence France-Presse, "for a heartbreaking image of a man clutching the hand of his deceased daughter a day after a 7.8-magnitude earthquake killed more than 50,000 people in Turkey and Syria."
Nicole S. Hester of The Tennessean, "for a distressing image of a young girl looking out of a school bus in anguish as she is evacuated from the scene of a deadly shooting at The Covenant School in Nashville."

Feature Photography
**Photography Staff of Associated Press**, "for poignant photographs chronicling unprecedented masses of migrants and their arduous journey north from Colombia to the border of the United States."
Hannah Reyes Morales, contributor, The New York Times, "for a creative series of photographs documenting a “youthquake” occurring in Africa where, by 2050, the continent will account for one-quarter of the world's population and one-third of its young people."
Nanna Heitmann, contributor, The New York Times, "for illuminating photographs portraying a generation living under President Vladimir Putin’s resurgent nationalism while Russia is at war in Ukraine."

Audio Reporting
**Staffs of the Invisible Institute and USG Audio**, "for a powerful series that revisits a Chicago hate crime from the 1990s, a fluid amalgam of memoir, community history and journalism."
Dan Slepian and Preeti Varathan of NBC News, "for their relentless 20-year investigation that resulted in a wrongfully-convicted man finally receiving clemency."
Lauren Chooljian, Alison Macadam, Jason Moon, Daniel Barrick and Katie Colaneri of New Hampshire Public Radio, "for their gripping and extensively reported investigation of corruption and sexual abuse within the lucrative recovery industry that sought accountability despite legal pressure."

=== Letters, drama, and music ===
Fiction
**Night Watch** by Jayne Anne Phillips
Wednesday’s Child by Yiyun Li
Same Bed Different Dreams by Ed Park

Drama
**Primary Trust** by Eboni Booth
Here There Are Blueberries by Moisés Kaufman and Amanda Gronich
Public Obscenities by Shayok Misha Chowdhury

History
**No Right to an Honest Living: The Struggles of Boston's Black Workers in the Civil War Era** by Jacqueline Jones
Continental Reckoning: The American West in the Age of Expansion by Elliott West
American Anarchy: The Epic Struggle between Immigrant Radicals and the US Government at the Dawn of the Twentieth Century by Michael Willrich

Biography
**King: A Life** by Jonathan Eig
**Master Slave Husband Wife: An Epic Journey from Slavery to Freedom** by Ilyon Woo
Larry McMurtry: A Life by Tracy Daugherty

Memoir or Autobiography
**Liliana's Invincible Summer: A Sister's Search for Justice** by Cristina Rivera Garza
The Country of the Blind: A Memoir at the End of Sight by Andrew Leland
The Best Minds: A Story of Friendship, Madness, and the Tragedy of Good Intentions by Jonathan Rosen

Poetry
**Tripas: Poems**, by Brandon Som
To 2040, by Jorie Graham
Information Desk: An Epic by Robyn Schiff

General Nonfiction
**A Day in the Life of Abed Salama: Anatomy of a Jerusalem Tragedy**, by Nathan Thrall
Fire Weather: A True Story From a Hotter World, by John Vaillant
Cobalt Red: How the Blood of the Congo Powers Our Lives, by Siddharth Kara

Music
**Adagio (for Wadada Leo Smith)**, by Tyshawn Sorey
Double Concerto for esperanza spalding, Claire Chase and large orchestra, by Felipe Lara
Paper Pianos, by Mary Kouyoumdjian
