= 2009 Pulitzer Prize =

Awards for journalism and related fields

The 2009 Pulitzer Prizes were announced on April 20, 2009, the 93rd annual awards.

The New York Times won five awards this year, with the Tampa Bay Times (formerly the St. Petersburg Times) being the only other multi-prize winner with two. Three organizations were awarded prizes for the first time: Las Vegas Sun, East Valley Tribune and The Post-Star.

== Journalism ==
Public service	Las Vegas Sun and notably Alexandra Berzon	" ... for the exposure of the high death rate among construction workers on the Las Vegas Strip amid lax enforcement of regulations, leading to changes in policy and improved safety conditions." Original series
Breaking news reporting	The New York Times	" ... for its swift and sweeping coverage of a sex scandal that resulted in the resignation of Gov. Eliot Spitzer, breaking the story on its Web site and then developing it with authoritative, rapid-fire reports."
Investigative reporting	David Barstow of The New York Times	" ... for his tenacious reporting that revealed how some retired generals, working as radio and television analysts, had been co-opted by the Pentagon to make its case for the war in Iraq, and how many of them also had undisclosed ties to companies that benefited from policies they defended." Original series, pt. 1, Original series, pt. 2
Explanatory reporting	Bettina Boxall and Julie Cart of the Los Angeles Times	" ... for their fresh and painstaking exploration into the cost and effectiveness of attempts to combat the growing menace of wildfires across the western United States." Original series
Local reporting	Detroit Free Press, and notably Jim Schaefer and M.L. Elrick	" ... for their uncovering of a pattern of lies by Mayor Kwame Kilpatrick that included denial of a sexual relationship with his female chief of staff, prompting an investigation of perjury that eventually led to jail terms for the two officials."
Local reporting	Ryan Gabrielson and Paul Giblin of the East Valley Tribune	" ... for their adroit use of limited resources to reveal, in print and online, how a popular sheriff's focus on immigration enforcement endangered investigation of violent crime and other aspects of public safety." Original series
National reporting	St. Petersburg Times	" ... for "PolitiFact," its fact-checking initiative during the 2008 presidential campaign that used probing reporters and the power of the World Wide Web to examine more than 750 political claims, separating rhetoric from truth to enlighten voters."
International reporting	The New York Times	" ... for its masterful, groundbreaking coverage of America's deepening military and political challenges in Afghanistan and Pakistan, reporting frequently done under perilous conditions." Original series
Feature writing	Lane DeGregory of the St. Petersburg Times	" ... for her moving, richly detailed story of a neglected little girl, found in a roach-infested room, unable to talk or feed herself, who was adopted by a new family committed to her nurturing." Original series
Commentary	Eugene Robinson of The Washington Post	" ... for his eloquent columns on the 2008 presidential campaign that focus on the election of the first African-American president, showcasing graceful writing and grasp of the larger historic picture."
Criticism	Holland Cotter of The New York Times	" ... for his wide-ranging reviews of art, from Manhattan to China, marked by acute observation, luminous writing and dramatic storytelling."
Editorial writing	Mark Mahoney of The Post-Star	" ... for his relentless, down-to-earth editorials on the perils of local government secrecy, effectively admonishing citizens to uphold their right to know."
Editorial cartooning	Steve Breen of The San Diego Union-Tribune	" ... for his agile use of a classic style to produce wide-ranging cartoons that engage readers with power, clarity and humor. " Cartoonist's page
Breaking news photography	Patrick Farrell of The Miami Herald	" ... for his provocative, impeccably composed images of despair after Hurricane Ike and other lethal storms caused a humanitarian disaster in Haiti." Photographer's page
Feature photography	Damon Winter of The New York Times	" ... for his memorable array of pictures deftly capturing multiple facets of Barack Obama's presidential campaign." Photographer's page

== Letters, Drama and Music Awards ==
Fiction	Olive Kitteridge by Elizabeth Strout (Random House)
Drama	Ruined by Lynn Nottage (TCG)
History	The Hemingses of Monticello: An American Family by Annette Gordon-Reed (W.W. Norton & Company)
Biography	American Lion: Andrew Jackson in the White House by Jon Meacham (Random House)
Poetry	The Shadow of Sirius by W.S. Merwin (Copper Canyon Press)
General Nonfiction	Slavery by Another Name: The Re-Enslavement of Black Americans from the Civil War to World War II by Douglas A. Blackmon (Doubleday)
Music	Double Sextet by Steve Reich (Boosey & Hawkes)

== Special Citation ==
Not awarded in 2009.
