= Pulitzer Prize for Local Reporting =

American journalism award

The Pulitzer Prize for Local Reporting is awarded to an example of "significant issues of local or statewide concern, demonstrating originality and community connection". This Pulitzer Prize was first awarded in 1948. Like most Pulitzers the winner receives a $15,000 award.

== History ==
The Pulitzer Prize for Local Reporting was first awarded from 1948 until 1952. Beginning in 1953, two awards for Local Reporting were given out by the committee, for Local Reporting, Edition Time and for Local Reporting, No Edition Time.

In 1964 the Local Reporting Pulitzers were again renamed to "Local Investigative Specialized Reporting" and "Local General or Spot News Reporting." These prizes existed until 1984, when they were done away with.

In 1985, several new Pulitzer Prizes were introduced, the Pulitzer Prize for Explanatory Journalism (later renamed "Explanatory Reporting"), the Pulitzer Prize for General News Reporting (later renamed "Breaking News Reporting"), the Pulitzer Prize for Investigative Reporting, and the Pulitzer Prize for Specialized Reporting. None of these prizes were reserved specifically for local reporting.

In 2006, the prize committee announced that the Pulitzer Prize for Beat Reporting was going to be replaced by a recreated Pulitzer Prize for Local Reporting. Debbie Cenziper of The Miami Herald became the first reporter to win the re-created Pulitzer for Local Reporting.

The Pulitzer Committee issues an official citation explaining the reasons for the award.

== Winners ==
=== From 1948 to 1952 ===
| Year | Name(s) | Publication | Rationale |
|---|---|---|---|
| 1948 | George Goodwin | The Atlanta Journal | "for his story of the Telfair County vote fraud, published in 1947." |
| 1949 | Malcolm Johnson | The Sun | "for his series of 24 articles entitled 'Crime on the Waterfront' in New York City." |
| 1950 | Meyer Berger | The New York Times | "for his 4,000 word story on the mass killings by Howard Unruh in Camden, New Jersey." |
| 1951 | Edward S. Montgomery | San Francisco Examiner | "for his series of articles on tax frauds which culminated in an exposé within the Bureau of Internal Revenue." |
| 1952 | George De Carvalho | San Francisco Chronicle | "for his stories of a 'ransom racket' extorting money from Chinese in the United States for relations held in Red China." |

=== From 2007 to present ===
| Year | Name(s) | Publication | Rationale |
|---|---|---|---|
| 2007 | Debbie Cenziper | Miami Herald | "for reports on waste, favoritism and lack of oversight at the Miami housing agency that resulted in dismissals, investigations and prosecutions." |
| 2007 | June Arney | The Baltimore Sun | "for their reports, in print and online, about abuses under an archaic state law that threatened to turn hundreds out of their homes." |
| 2007 | Fred Schulte | The Baltimore Sun | "for their reports, in print and online, about abuses under an archaic state law that threatened to turn hundreds out of their homes." |
| 2007 | Staff | The Boston Globe | "for its well documented exposure, in print and online, of unscrupulous debt collectors, causing two firms to close and prompting action by state officials." |
| 2008 | Dave Umhoefer | Milwaukee Journal Sentinel | "for his stories on the skirting of tax laws to pad pensions of county employees, prompting change and possible prosecution of key figures." |
| 2008 | John Brennan | The Record | "for their probe of how plans to build a luxury community atop old landfills became entangled in questionable state loans and other allegations of favoritism." |
| 2008 | Tim Nostrand | The Record | "for their probe of how plans to build a luxury community atop old landfills became entangled in questionable state loans and other allegations of favoritism." |
| 2008 | Jeff Pillets | The Record | "for their probe of how plans to build a luxury community atop old landfills became entangled in questionable state loans and other allegations of favoritism." |
| 2008 | Chris Davis | Sarasota Herald-Tribune | "for their dogged exposure, in print and online, of predatory teachers and the system that protects them, stirring state and national action." |
| 2008 | Matthew Doig | Sarasota Herald-Tribune | "for their dogged exposure, in print and online, of predatory teachers and the system that protects them, stirring state and national action." |
| 2008 | Tiffany Lankes | Sarasota Herald-Tribune | "for their dogged exposure, in print and online, of predatory teachers and the system that protects them, stirring state and national action." |
| 2009 | M. L. Elrick | Detroit Free Press | "for their uncovering of a pattern of lies by Mayor Kwame Kilpatrick that included denial of a sexual relationship with his female chief of staff, prompting an investigation of perjury that eventually led to jail terms for the two officials." |
| 2009 | Jim Schaefer | Detroit Free Press | "for their uncovering of a pattern of lies by Mayor Kwame Kilpatrick that included denial of a sexual relationship with his female chief of staff, prompting an investigation of perjury that eventually led to jail terms for the two officials." |
| 2009 | Staff | Detroit Free Press | "for their uncovering of a pattern of lies by Mayor Kwame Kilpatrick that included denial of a sexual relationship with his female chief of staff, prompting an investigation of perjury that eventually led to jail terms for the two officials." |
| 2009 | Ryan Gabrielson | East Valley Tribune | "for their adroit use of limited resources to reveal, in print and online, how a popular sheriff's focus on immigration enforcement endangered investigation of violent crime and other aspects of public safety." |
| 2009 | Paul Giblin | East Valley Tribune | "for their adroit use of limited resources to reveal, in print and online, how a popular sheriff's focus on immigration enforcement endangered investigation of violent crime and other aspects of public safety." |
| 2009 | Michael DeMocker | The Times-Picayune | "for their multifaceted examination of a murder case that showed deep understanding of the community, its social ills and the often frustrating path to justice." |
| 2009 | Brendan McCarthy | The Times-Picayune | "for their multifaceted examination of a murder case that showed deep understanding of the community, its social ills and the often frustrating path to justice." |
| 2009 | Ryan Smith | The Times-Picayune | "for their multifaceted examination of a murder case that showed deep understanding of the community, its social ills and the often frustrating path to justice." |
| 2010 | Raquel Rutledge | Milwaukee Journal Sentinel | "for her penetrating reports on the fraud and abuse in a child-care program for low-wage working parents that fleeced taxpayers and imperiled children, resulting in a state and federal crackdown on providers." |
| 2010 | Edmund Fountain | St. Petersburg Times | "for their dogged reporting and searing storytelling that illuminated decades of abuse at a Florida reform school for boys and sparked remedial action." |
| 2010 | Ben Montgomery | St. Petersburg Times | "for their dogged reporting and searing storytelling that illuminated decades of abuse at a Florida reform school for boys and sparked remedial action." |
| 2010 | Waveney Ann Moore | St. Petersburg Times | "for their dogged reporting and searing storytelling that illuminated decades of abuse at a Florida reform school for boys and sparked remedial action." |
| 2010 | Dave Philipps | The Gazette | "for his painstaking stories on the spike in violence within a battered combat brigade returning to Fort Carson after bloody deployments to Iraq, leading to increased mental health care for soldiers." |
| 2011 | John J. Kim | Chicago Sun-Times | "for immersive documentation of violence in Chicago neighborhoods, probing the lives of victims, criminals and detectives as a widespread code of silence impedes solutions." |
| 2011 | Mark Konkol | Chicago Sun-Times | "for immersive documentation of violence in Chicago neighborhoods, probing the lives of victims, criminals and detectives as a widespread code of silence impedes solutions." |
| 2011 | Frank Main | Chicago Sun-Times | "for immersive documentation of violence in Chicago neighborhoods, probing the lives of victims, criminals and detectives as a widespread code of silence impedes solutions." |
| 2011 | Marshall Allen | Las Vegas Sun | "for their compelling reports on patients who suffered preventable injuries and other harm during hospital care, taking advantage of print and digital tools to drive home their findings." |
| 2011 | Alex Richards | Las Vegas Sun | "for their compelling reports on patients who suffered preventable injuries and other harm during hospital care, taking advantage of print and digital tools to drive home their findings." |
| 2011 | Stanley Nelson | Concordia Sentinel | "for his courageous and determined efforts to unravel a long forgotten Ku Klux Klan murder during the civil rights era." |
| 2011 | Sara Ganim | The Patriot-News | "for courageously revealing and adeptly covering the explosive Penn State sex scandal involving former football coach Jerry Sandusky." |
| 2011 | Staff | The Patriot-News | "for courageously revealing and adeptly covering the explosive Penn State sex scandal involving former football coach Jerry Sandusky." |
| 2011 | Matt Hongoltz-Hetling | The Advertiser Democrat | "for their tenacious exposure of disgraceful conditions in federally-supported housing in a small rural community that, within hours, triggered a state investigation." |
| 2011 | A. M. Sheehan | The Advertiser Democrat | "for their tenacious exposure of disgraceful conditions in federally-supported housing in a small rural community that, within hours, triggered a state investigation." |
| 2011 | Staff | California Watch | "for its rigorous probe of deficient earthquake protection in the construction of public schools across the state, telling the story with words, graphics, videos and other tools." |
| 2013 | Glenn Howatt | The Minnesota Star Tribune | "for powerful reports on the spike in infant deaths at poorly regulated day-care homes, resulting in legislative action to strengthen rules." |
| 2013 | Jeremy Olson | The Minnesota Star Tribune | "for powerful reports on the spike in infant deaths at poorly regulated day-care homes, resulting in legislative action to strengthen rules." |
| 2013 | Brad Schrade | The Minnesota Star Tribune | "for powerful reports on the spike in infant deaths at poorly regulated day-care homes, resulting in legislative action to strengthen rules." |
| 2013 | Ames Alexander | The Charlotte Observer | "for their tenacious joint project investigating how the state's major nonprofit hospitals generate large profits and contribute to the high cost of health care." |
| 2013 | Karen Garloch | The Charlotte Observer | "for their tenacious joint project investigating how the state's major nonprofit hospitals generate large profits and contribute to the high cost of health care." |
| 2013 | Joseph Neff | The News and Observer | "for their tenacious joint project investigating how the state's major nonprofit hospitals generate large profits and contribute to the high cost of health care." |
| 2013 | David Raynor | The News and Observer | "for their tenacious joint project investigating how the state's major nonprofit hospitals generate large profits and contribute to the high cost of health care." |
| 2013 | David Breen | Orlando Sentinel | "for their aggressive coverage of hazing rituals by the Florida A&M University marching band that killed a drum major and led to the resignation of the band leader and the university president." |
| 2013 | Stephen Hudak | Orlando Sentinel | "for their aggressive coverage of hazing rituals by the Florida A&M University marching band that killed a drum major and led to the resignation of the band leader and the university president." |
| 2013 | Jeff Kunerth | Orlando Sentinel | "for their aggressive coverage of hazing rituals by the Florida A&M University marching band that killed a drum major and led to the resignation of the band leader and the university president." |
| 2013 | Denise-Marie Ordway | Orlando Sentinel | "for their aggressive coverage of hazing rituals by the Florida A&M University marching band that killed a drum major and led to the resignation of the band leader and the university president." |
| 2014 | Will Hobson | Tampa Bay Times | "for their relentless investigation into the squalid conditions that marked housing for the city's substantial homeless population, leading to swift reforms." |
| 2014 | Michael LaForgia | Tampa Bay Times | "for their relentless investigation into the squalid conditions that marked housing for the city's substantial homeless population, leading to swift reforms." |
| 2014 | Joan Garrett McClane | Chattanooga Times Free Press | "for using an array of journalistic tools to explore the 'no-snitch' culture that helps perpetuate a cycle of violence in one of the most dangerous cities in the South." |
| 2014 | Mary Helen Miller | Chattanooga Times Free Press | "for using an array of journalistic tools to explore the 'no-snitch' culture that helps perpetuate a cycle of violence in one of the most dangerous cities in the South." |
| 2014 | Todd South | Chattanooga Times Free Press | "for using an array of journalistic tools to explore the 'no-snitch' culture that helps perpetuate a cycle of violence in one of the most dangerous cities in the South." |
| 2014 | Doug Strickland | Chattanooga Times Free Press | "for using an array of journalistic tools to explore the 'no-snitch' culture that helps perpetuate a cycle of violence in one of the most dangerous cities in the South." |
| 2014 | Thomas Mashberg | The Record | "for their jarring exposure of how heroin has permeated the suburbs of Northern New Jersey, profiling addicts and anguished families and mapping the drug pipeline from South America to their community." |
| 2014 | Rebecca O'Brien | The Record | "for their jarring exposure of how heroin has permeated the suburbs of Northern New Jersey, profiling addicts and anguished families and mapping the drug pipeline from South America to their community." |
| 2015 | Rebecca Kimitch | Daily Breeze | "for their inquiry into widespread corruption in a small, cash-strapped school district, including impressive use of the paper's website." |
| 2015 | Rob Kuznia | Daily Breeze | "for their inquiry into widespread corruption in a small, cash-strapped school district, including impressive use of the paper's website." |
| 2015 | Frank Suraci | Daily Breeze | "for their inquiry into widespread corruption in a small, cash-strapped school district, including impressive use of the paper's website." |
| 2015 | Cary Aspinwall | Tulsa World | "for courageous reporting on the execution process in Oklahoma after a botched execution—reporting that began a national discussion." |
| 2015 | Ziva Branstetter | Tulsa World | "for courageous reporting on the execution process in Oklahoma after a botched execution—reporting that began a national discussion." |
| 2015 | Joe Mahr | Chicago Tribune | "for their probe into government corruption in a Chicago suburb, using public records, human stories and shoe-leather reporting to lay out the consequences." |
| 2015 | Joseph Ryan | Chicago Tribune | "for their probe into government corruption in a Chicago suburb, using public records, human stories and shoe-leather reporting to lay out the consequences." |
| 2015 | Matthew Walberg | Chicago Tribune | "for their probe into government corruption in a Chicago suburb, using public records, human stories and shoe-leather reporting to lay out the consequences." |
| 2016 | Cara Fitzpatrick | Tampa Bay Times | "for exposing a local school board's culpability in turning some county schools into failure factories, with tragic consequences for the community." (Note: Moved by the Pulitzer board from the Public Service category.) |
| 2016 | Lisa Gartner | Tampa Bay Times | "for exposing a local school board's culpability in turning some county schools into failure factories, with tragic consequences for the community." |
| 2016 | Michael LaForgia | Tampa Bay Times | "for exposing a local school board's culpability in turning some county schools into failure factories, with tragic consequences for the community." |
| 2016 | Sohail Al-Jamea | Miami Herald | "for the impressive reporting, enhanced by video and graphic elements, on a local drug sting that cost tens of millions of dollars but yielded no significant arrests." |
| 2016 | Emily Michot | Miami Herald | "for the impressive reporting, enhanced by video and graphic elements, on a local drug sting that cost tens of millions of dollars but yielded no significant arrests." |
| 2016 | Michael Sallah | Miami Herald | "for the impressive reporting, enhanced by video and graphic elements, on a local drug sting that cost tens of millions of dollars but yielded no significant arrests." |
| 2016 | Joanna Zuckerman Bernstein | Miami Herald | "for the impressive reporting, enhanced by video and graphic elements, on a local drug sting that cost tens of millions of dollars but yielded no significant arrests." |
| 2016 | Glenn Howatt | The Minnesota Star Tribune | "for a compelling exploration of the state's archaic and dehumanizing healthcare system for the disabled, leading to swift proposals to improve treatment." |
| 2016 | David Joles | The Minnesota Star Tribune | "for a compelling exploration of the state's archaic and dehumanizing healthcare system for the disabled, leading to swift proposals to improve treatment." |
| 2016 | Chris Serres | The Minnesota Star Tribune | "for a compelling exploration of the state's archaic and dehumanizing healthcare system for the disabled, leading to swift proposals to improve treatment." |
| 2016 | Sarah Maslin Nir | The New York Times | "for an investigation into the ugly side of the beauty industry, exposing labor and health practices detrimental to workers in nail salons." |
| 2017 | Staff | The Salt Lake Tribune | "for a string of vivid reports revealing the perverse, punitive and cruel treatment given to sexual assault victims at Brigham Young University, one of Utah's most powerful institutions." |
| 2017 | Maria Cramer | The Boston Globe | "for a revelatory look at how the closing of psychiatric hospitals left many seriously mentally ill people a danger to themselves and their loved ones and led them into deadly encounters with the police." |
| 2017 | Scott Helman | The Boston Globe | "for a revelatory look at how the closing of psychiatric hospitals left many seriously mentally ill people a danger to themselves and their loved ones and led them into deadly encounters with the police." |
| 2017 | Michael Rezendes | The Boston Globe | "for a revelatory look at how the closing of psychiatric hospitals left many seriously mentally ill people a danger to themselves and their loved ones and led them into deadly encounters with the police." |
| 2017 | Jenna Russell | The Boston Globe | "for a revelatory look at how the closing of psychiatric hospitals left many seriously mentally ill people a danger to themselves and their loved ones and led them into deadly encounters with the police." |
| 2017 | Todd Wallack | The Boston Globe | "for a revelatory look at how the closing of psychiatric hospitals left many seriously mentally ill people a danger to themselves and their loved ones and led them into deadly encounters with the police." |
| 2017 | Robert Gebeloff | The New York Times | "for analyzing nearly 60,000 discipline cases and parole decisions to show that minority inmates in New York state prisons were punished at a far higher rate than white inmates." |
| 2017 | Michael Schwirtz | The New York Times | "for analyzing nearly 60,000 discipline cases and parole decisions to show that minority inmates in New York state prisons were punished at a far higher rate than white inmates." |
| 2017 | Michael Winerip | The New York Times | "for analyzing nearly 60,000 discipline cases and parole decisions to show that minority inmates in New York state prisons were punished at a far higher rate than white inmates." |
| 2018 | Staff | The Cincinnati Enquirer | "for a riveting and insightful narrative and video documenting seven days of Greater Cincinnati's heroin epidemic, revealing how the deadly addiction has ravaged families and communities." |
| 2018 | Jason Grotto | ProPublica Illinois | "for deep reporting that included analysis of more than 100 million electronic tax records to show how systemic favoritism and political neglect influenced assessments at the expense of the working class and poor in majority black and Latino neighborhoods." |
| 2018 | Sandhya Kambhampati | ProPublica Illinois | "for deep reporting that included analysis of more than 100 million electronic tax records to show how systemic favoritism and political neglect influenced assessments at the expense of the working class and poor in majority black and Latino neighborhoods." |
| 2018 | Ray Long | Chicago Tribune | "for deep reporting that included analysis of more than 100 million electronic tax records to show how systemic favoritism and political neglect influenced assessments at the expense of the working class and poor in majority black and Latino neighborhoods." |
| 2018 | Staff | The Boston Globe | "for a poignant and illuminating exploration of the city's fraught history of race relations that went beyond the anecdotal, using data to demonstrate how racism infiltrates every institution and aspect of city life." |
| 2019 | Staff | The Advocate | "for a damning portrayal of the state's discriminatory conviction system, including a Jim Crow-era law, that enabled Louisiana courts to send defendants to jail without jury consensus on the accused's guilt." |
| 2019 | Jennifer Bjorhus | The Minnesota Star Tribune | "for an illuminating and disturbing series that exposed breakdowns in Minnesota's investigation and prosecution of rape cases, and how such ineptitude fails victims of sexual assault." |
| 2019 | Renée Jones Schneider | The Minnesota Star Tribune | "for an illuminating and disturbing series that exposed breakdowns in Minnesota's investigation and prosecution of rape cases, and how such ineptitude fails victims of sexual assault." |
| 2019 | Brandon Stahl | The Minnesota Star Tribune | "for an illuminating and disturbing series that exposed breakdowns in Minnesota's investigation and prosecution of rape cases, and how such ineptitude fails victims of sexual assault." |
| 2019 | MaryJo Webster | The Minnesota Star Tribune | "for an illuminating and disturbing series that exposed breakdowns in Minnesota's investigation and prosecution of rape cases, and how such ineptitude fails victims of sexual assault." |
| 2019 | Jessica Griffin | The Philadelphia Inquirer | "for dogged scientific investigation and evocative storytelling that exposed toxic dangers lurking in Philadelphia school buildings that sickened children in their classrooms." |
| 2019 | Barbara Laker | The Philadelphia Inquirer | "for dogged scientific investigation and evocative storytelling that exposed toxic dangers lurking in Philadelphia school buildings that sickened children in their classrooms." |
| 2019 | Dylan Purcell | The Philadelphia Inquirer | "for dogged scientific investigation and evocative storytelling that exposed toxic dangers lurking in Philadelphia school buildings that sickened children in their classrooms." |
| 2019 | Wendy Ruderman | The Philadelphia Inquirer | "for dogged scientific investigation and evocative storytelling that exposed toxic dangers lurking in Philadelphia school buildings that sickened children in their classrooms." |
| 2020 | Staff | The Baltimore Sun | "for illuminating, impactful reporting on a lucrative, undisclosed financial relationship between the city's mayor and the public hospital system she helped to oversee." |
| 2020 | Shelly Bradbury | Pittsburgh Post-Gazette | "for an unprecedented investigation of child sexual abuse and cover-ups in the insular Amish and Mennonite communities." |
| 2020 | Peter Smith | Pittsburgh Post-Gazette | "for an unprecedented investigation of child sexual abuse and cover-ups in the insular Amish and Mennonite communities." |
| 2020 | Stephanie Strasburg | Pittsburgh Post-Gazette | "for an unprecedented investigation of child sexual abuse and cover-ups in the insular Amish and Mennonite communities." |
| 2020 | Staff | The Boston Globe | "for its engaging approach to exposing socioeconomic inequities by surveying the city's brightest public high school students a decade after graduation." |
| 2021 | Neil Bedi | Tampa Bay Times | "for resourceful, creative reporting that exposed how a powerful and politically connected sheriff built a secretive intelligence operation that harassed residents and used grades and child welfare records to profile schoolchildren." |
| 2021 | Kathleen McGrory | Tampa Bay Times | "for resourceful, creative reporting that exposed how a powerful and politically connected sheriff built a secretive intelligence operation that harassed residents and used grades and child welfare records to profile schoolchildren." |
| 2021 | Jack Dolan | Los Angeles Times | "for exposing failures in Los Angeles County's safety-net healthcare system that resulted in months-long wait times for patients, including some who died before getting appointments with specialists." |
| 2021 | Brittny Mejia | Los Angeles Times | "for exposing failures in Los Angeles County's safety-net healthcare system that resulted in months-long wait times for patients, including some who died before getting appointments with specialists." |
| 2021 | Staff | The Post and Courier | "for an ambitious look at how water levels in the city were rising faster than previously thought that also explored the broader social, environmental and regulatory challenges posed by climate change." |
| 2022 | Madison Hopkins | Better Government Association | "for a piercing examination of the city's long history of failed building- and fire-safety code enforcement, which let scofflaw landlords commit serious violations that resulted in dozens of unnecessary deaths." |
| 2022 | Cecilia Reyes | Chicago Tribune | "for a piercing examination of the city's long history of failed building- and fire-safety code enforcement, which let scofflaw landlords commit serious violations that resulted in dozens of unnecessary deaths." |
| 2022 | Tony Cook | The Indianapolis Star | "for their critical examination of Indiana's 'red flag' gun law, identifying numerous instances where police and prosecutors had failed to understand and enforce the law." |
| 2022 | Johnny Magdaleno | The Indianapolis Star | "for their critical examination of Indiana's 'red flag' gun law, identifying numerous instances where police and prosecutors had failed to understand and enforce the law." |
| 2022 | Michelle Pemberton | The Indianapolis Star | "for their critical examination of Indiana's 'red flag' gun law, identifying numerous instances where police and prosecutors had failed to understand and enforce the law." |
| 2022 | Maya Miller | ProPublica | "for a comprehensive investigation, including interactives and graphics, that revealed dangerous air quality during Florida's sugar cane harvest season and prompted significant reforms." |
| 2022 | Ash Ngu | ProPublica | "for a comprehensive investigation, including interactives and graphics, that revealed dangerous air quality during Florida's sugar cane harvest season and prompted significant reforms." |
| 2022 | Nadia Sussman | ProPublica | "for a comprehensive investigation, including interactives and graphics, that revealed dangerous air quality during Florida's sugar cane harvest season and prompted significant reforms." |
| 2022 | Lulu Ramadan | The Palm Beach Post | "for a comprehensive investigation, including interactives and graphics, that revealed dangerous air quality during Florida's sugar cane harvest season and prompted significant reforms." |
| 2023 | John Archibald | AL.com | "for a series exposing how the police force in the town of Brookside preyed on residents to inflate revenue, coverage that prompted the resignation of the police chief, four new laws and a state audit." |
| 2023 | Ramsey Archibald | AL.com | "for a series exposing how the police force in the town of Brookside preyed on residents to inflate revenue, coverage that prompted the resignation of the police chief, four new laws and a state audit." |
| 2023 | Ashley Remkus | AL.com | "for a series exposing how the police force in the town of Brookside preyed on residents to inflate revenue, coverage that prompted the resignation of the police chief, four new laws and a state audit." |
| 2023 | Challen Stephens | AL.com | "for a series exposing how the police force in the town of Brookside preyed on residents to inflate revenue, coverage that prompted the resignation of the police chief, four new laws and a state audit." |
| 2023 | Anna Wolfe | Mississippi Today | "for reporting that revealed how a former Mississippi governor used his office to steer millions of state welfare dollars to benefit his family and friends, including NFL quarterback Brett Favre." |
| 2023 | Staff | Los Angeles Times | "for coverage of the state's legal cannabis industry that combined satellite imagery, public records searches and sometimes dangerous on-the-ground reporting to reveal widespread criminality, labor abuses and environmental consequences." |
| 2024 | Sarah Conway | City Bureau | "for their investigative series on missing Black girls and women in Chicago that revealed how systemic racism and police department neglect contributed to the crisis." |
| 2024 | Trina Reynolds-Tyler | Invisible Institute | "for their investigative series on missing Black girls and women in Chicago that revealed how systemic racism and police department neglect contributed to the crisis." |
| 2024 | Ilyssa Daly | Mississippi Today / The New York Times | "for their detailed examination of corruption and abuse, including the torturing of suspects, by Mississippi sheriffs and their officers over two decades." |
| 2024 | Brian Howey | Mississippi Today / The New York Times | "for their detailed examination of corruption and abuse, including the torturing of suspects, by Mississippi sheriffs and their officers over two decades." |
| 2024 | Jerry Mitchell | Mississippi Today / The New York Times | "for their detailed examination of corruption and abuse, including the torturing of suspects, by Mississippi sheriffs and their officers over two decades." |
| 2024 | Nate Rosenfield | Mississippi Today / The New York Times | "for their detailed examination of corruption and abuse, including the torturing of suspects, by Mississippi sheriffs and their officers over two decades." |
| 2024 | Staff | The Villages Daily Sun | "for its comprehensive investigation and moment-by-moment account of Florida officials' inaction before, during and after Hurricane Ian, the deadliest storm to strike the state since 1935." |
| 2025 | Jessica Gallagher | The Baltimore Banner / The New York Times | "for a compassionate investigative series that captured the breathtaking dimensions of Baltimore's fentanyl crisis and its disproportionate impact on older Black men, creating a sophisticated statistical model that The Banner shared with other newsrooms." |
| 2025 | Nick Thieme | The Baltimore Banner / The New York Times | "for a compassionate investigative series that captured the breathtaking dimensions of Baltimore's fentanyl crisis and its disproportionate impact on older Black men, creating a sophisticated statistical model that The Banner shared with other newsrooms." |
| 2025 | Alissa Zhu | The Baltimore Banner / The New York Times | "for a compassionate investigative series that captured the breathtaking dimensions of Baltimore's fentanyl crisis and its disproportionate impact on older Black men, creating a sophisticated statistical model that The Banner shared with other newsrooms." |
| 2025 | Lynda Mapes | The Seattle Times | "for their investigative series revealing how the Washington state government spent $1 million per day on construction that failed to safeguard either the salmon or the tribal treaty rights it was meant to protect." |
| 2025 | Fiona Martin | The Seattle Times | "for their investigative series revealing how the Washington state government spent $1 million per day on construction that failed to safeguard either the salmon or the tribal treaty rights it was meant to protect." |
| 2025 | Mike Reicher | The Seattle Times | "for their investigative series revealing how the Washington state government spent $1 million per day on construction that failed to safeguard either the salmon or the tribal treaty rights it was meant to protect." |
| 2025 | Katey Rusch | San Francisco Chronicle / University of California, Berkeley Investigative Reporting Program | "for a multiyear investigation into a secret system of legal settlements that concealed California police misconduct for decades and kept offending officers in positions of power." |
| 2025 | Casey Smith | San Francisco Chronicle / University of California, Berkeley Investigative Reporting Program | "for a multiyear investigation into a secret system of legal settlements that concealed California police misconduct for decades and kept offending officers in positions of power." |
| 2026 | Dave Altimari | The Connecticut Mirror | "for an impressive series exposing how the state's unique towing laws favored unscrupulous companies that overcharged residents, prompting swift and meaningful consumer protections." |
| 2026 | Ginny Monk | The Connecticut Mirror | "for an impressive series exposing how the state's unique towing laws favored unscrupulous companies that overcharged residents, prompting swift and meaningful consumer protections." |
| 2026 | Sophie Chou | ProPublica | "for an impressive series exposing how the state's unique towing laws favored unscrupulous companies that overcharged residents, prompting swift and meaningful consumer protections." |
| 2026 | Haru Coryne | ProPublica | "for an impressive series exposing how the state's unique towing laws favored unscrupulous companies that overcharged residents, prompting swift and meaningful consumer protections." |
| 2026 | Staff | Chicago Tribune | "for its powerful coverage of the Trump administration's militarized immigration sweep of the city that described in vivid, muscular prose how the siege-like incursion of ICE agents unified Chicagoans in resistance." |
| 2026 | Liz Bowie | The Baltimore Banner | "for coverage, including datasets and immersive storytelling, that showed how Baltimore's transit system forces long commutes on students, exposing them to potential dangers and causing them to miss classes, reporting that inspired a community search for solutions." |
| 2026 | Greg Morton | The Baltimore Banner | "for coverage, including datasets and immersive storytelling, that showed how Baltimore's transit system forces long commutes on students, exposing them to potential dangers and causing them to miss classes, reporting that inspired a community search for solutions." |
| 2026 | Ryan Little | The Baltimore Banner | "for coverage, including datasets and immersive storytelling, that showed how Baltimore's transit system forces long commutes on students, exposing them to potential dangers and causing them to miss classes, reporting that inspired a community search for solutions." |
| 2026 | Allan James Vestal | The Baltimore Banner | "for coverage, including datasets and immersive storytelling, that showed how Baltimore's transit system forces long commutes on students, exposing them to potential dangers and causing them to miss classes, reporting that inspired a community search for solutions." |
| 2026 | Staff | Miami Herald | "for a dynamically illustrated, data-driven series that exposed the human cost behind the high-speed Brightline railroad, which has killed more people per mile than any other passenger rail system, reporting that triggered the release of safety funding and new crossing standards." |
| 2026 | Staff | WLRN | "for a dynamically illustrated, data-driven series that exposed the human cost behind the high-speed Brightline railroad, which has killed more people per mile than any other passenger rail system, reporting that triggered the release of safety funding and new crossing standards." |
