= Chicago Reader =

Alternative weekly newspaper in Chicago

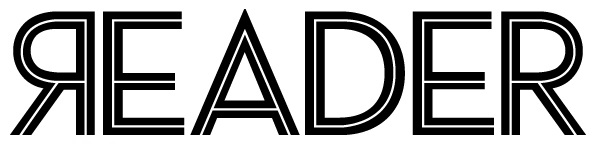

- An issue of Chicago Reader
- Type: Alternative weekly
- Format: Tabloid
- Owner: Noisy Creek
- Publisher: Malik Jackson
- Editor: Sarah Conway
- Founded: October 1, 1971; 55 years ago
- Headquarters: 2930 S. Michigan Ave. Suite 102; Chicago, Illinois 60616; United States
- Circulation: 63,000 (as of June 2025)
- ISSN: 1096-6919
- OCLC number: 1105307753
- Website: chicagoreader.com

The Chicago Reader, or Reader, is an American alternative newspaper in Chicago, Illinois, noted for its literary style of journalism and coverage of the arts, particularly film and theater. The Reader has been recognized as a pioneer among alternative weeklies for both its creative nonfiction and its commercial scheme. Richard Karpel, then–executive director of the Association of Alternative Newsweeklies, wrote:

[T]he most significant historical event in the creation of the modern alt-weekly occurred in Chicago in 1971, when the Chicago Reader pioneered the practice of free circulation, a cornerstone of today's alternative papers. The Reader also developed a new kind of journalism, ignoring the news and focusing on everyday life and ordinary people.

The Reader was founded by a group of friends from Carleton College, and four of them remained its primary owners for 36 years. While annual revenue reached an all-time high of $22.6 million in 2002, double what it had been a decade earlier, profits and readership then went into steep decline, and ownership changed several times between 2007 and 2018. In 2022, the owners transferred the Reader to a new non-profit organization, the Reader Institute for Community Journalism.

On June 22, 2020, the Reader, citing a 90% drop in advertising revenue due to COVID-19 shutdowns, announced that it was pivoting from a weekly to a biweekly print schedule, with a renewed focus on digital content and storytelling and a refreshed special issues calendar. The Reader returned to weekly publishing in June 2024. The Reader is dated every Thursday and distributed free on Wednesday and Thursday via street boxes and cooperating retail outlets. As of June 2020, the paper claimed to have nearly 1,200 locations in the Chicago metropolitan area and circulation of 60,000, a fraction of what circulation had been in the mid-2000s. The Reader remains among the largest and most successful alternative newspapers in the country. Weekly readership had once been put at 450,000.

== Publication history ==
=== 1971–1995 ===
The Chicago Reader was founded by Robert A. Roth, who grew up in the Chicago suburb of Arlington Heights. His ambition was to start a weekly publication for young Chicagoans like Boston's The Phoenix and Boston After Dark. Those papers were sold on newsstands but were also given away, mostly on campuses, to bolster circulation. Roth believed that 100-percent free circulation would work better, and he persuaded several friends from Carleton College, including Robert E. McCamant, Thomas J. Rehwaldt and Thomas K. Yoder, to join him in his venture. They pooled about $16,000 (about $125,000 in 2024 dollars) and published the first issue, 16 pages, on October 1, 1971.

One year later, in its first anniversary issue, the Reader published an article titled "What Kind of Paper is This, Anyway?" in which it answered "Questions we've heard over and over in the past year." This article reported that the paper had lost nearly $20,000 in its first ten months of operation but that the owners were "confident it will work out in the end." It explained the rationale behind free circulation and the paper's unconventional editorial philosophy: "Why doesn't the Reader print news? Tom Wolfe wrote us, 'The Future of the newspaper (as opposed to the past, which is available at every newsstand) lies in your direction, i.e., the sheet willing to deal with "the way we live now."' That sums up our thoughts quite well: we find street sellers more interesting than politicians, and musicians more interesting than the [[[Chicago] Cubs]]. They are closer to home."

In its early years the Reader was published out of apartments shared by the owner-founders, Roth, McCamant, Rehwaldt and Yoder. The first apartment was in Hyde Park—the University of Chicago neighborhood on the south side of Chicago—and the second was in Rogers Park on the far north side. Working for ownership in lieu of pay, the owner-founders ultimately owned more than 90% of the company.

In 1979, a reporter for the Daily Herald of Arlington Heights, Illinois, called the Reader "the fastest growing alternative weekly in the U.S." In 1986, an article in the Chicago Tribune estimated the Reader's annual revenues at $6.7 million. In 1996, Crain's Chicago Business projected revenue of $14.6 million. The National Journal's Convention Daily (published during the 1996 Democratic National Convention in Chicago) reported that the Reader was "an enormous financial success. It's now as thick as many Sunday papers and is published in four sections that total around 180 pages." This report put the circulation at 138,000.

=== 1995–2006 ===
A 2008 article in the Columbia Journalism Review by Edward McClelland, a former Reader staff writer (then known as Ted Kleine), faulted the Reader for having been slow to embrace the Web and suggested that it had trouble appealing to a new generation of young readers. "Alternative weeklies are expected to be eternally youthful", McClelland wrote. "The Reader is finding that a tough act to pull off as it approaches forty." He also suggested the Reader had grown complacent "because it was still raking in ad profits through the early 2000s" and its troubles were aggravated by a 2004 makeover that included "features on fashion" and a "tattooed, twenty-seven-year-old stripper" writing a late-night party column. "The feeling was the Reader had to be reinvented ... and change its character."

=== 2007–2017 ===
The precipitous decline in profits from 2004 to 2006 prompted owner-founder Tom Rehwaldt to file a lawsuit against the company. This lawsuit led to the sale of the Reader and its sibling, Washington City Paper, to Creative Loafing in July 2007, publisher of alternative weeklies in Atlanta, Georgia; Charlotte, North Carolina; and Tampa and Sarasota, Florida. Creative Loafing filed for bankruptcy in September 2008. In August 2009, the bankruptcy court awarded the company to Creative Loafing's chief creditor, Atalaya Capital Management, which had loaned $30 million to pay for most of the purchase price for the Reader and the Washington City Paper.

In late 2007, under a budget cutback imposed by the new owners at Creative Loafing, the Reader laid off several of its most experienced journalists, including John Conroy, Harold Henderson, Tori Marlan and Steve Bogira. The paper had de-emphasized the tradition of offbeat feature stories in favor of theme issues and aggressive, opinionated reporting on city government, for example its extensive coverage of tax increment financing (TIFs) by Ben Joravsky, who has been a staff writer since the 1980s. Though the staff was much smaller than it was before the sale, many other key figures remained as of June 2010, including media critic Michael Miner, film critic J.R. Jones, arts reporter Deanna Isaacs, food writer Mike Sula, theater critic Albert Williams, and music writers Peter Margasak and Miles Raymer. In November 2009, James Warren, former managing editor for features at the Chicago Tribune, was named president and publisher. In March, 2010, Warren resigned. In June, longtime editor Alison True was fired by acting publisher Alison Draper and Creative Loafing CEO Marty Petty, sparking outrage among the paper's remaining audience. In July, Draper was named publisher, managing editor Kiki Yablon was promoted to editor, and Geoff Dougherty was named associate publisher. Dougherty had founded and subsequently closed the online Chi-Town Daily News and its successor, the print-and-online Chicago Current, which he closed to take the Reader job.

In 2012, the Chicago Reader was acquired by Wrapports LLC, parent company of the Chicago Sun-Times.

Managing editor Jake Malooley was formally named editor-in-chief in July 2015. In February 2018 Malooley was fired by phone at O'Hare Airport as he returned from his honeymoon by newly appointed Executive Editor Mark Konkol. Konkol was fired by Sun-Times Media only 19 days after his appointment, following the publication of a controversial editorial cartoon that was deemed to be race baiting.

On July 13, 2017, a consortium consisting of private investors & the Chicago Federation of Labor, led by businessman & former Chicago alderman Edwin Eisendrath, through Eisendrath's company, ST Acquisition Holdings, acquired the Chicago Sun-Times and the Chicago Reader from Wrapports, beating out Chicago-based publishing company Tronc for ownership.

=== 2018–2026 ===
Effective October 1, 2018, Sun-Times Media sold the Reader to a private investment group, which formed an L3C to make the purchase. The major investors were Chicagoans Elzie Higginbottom and Leonard Goodman. Tracy Baim was named publisher and Anne Elizabeth Moore editor. Moore's tenure as editor was short-lived; she abruptly departed in March 2019. In June 2019 Karen Hawkins and Sujay Kumar were announced as new editors in chief, previously managing editors who had been serving as interim editors in chief following Moore's departure. In November 2020, the Reader announced co-editor Hawkins would also serve as co-publisher with Baim, while Baim was also made president.

On June 22, 2020, the Reader, citing a 90% drop in advertising revenue due to COVID-19 shutdowns, announced that it was pivoting from a weekly to a biweekly print schedule, with a renewed focus on digital content and storytelling and a refreshed special issues calendar.

Goodman, who had submitted a semi-regular column for the Reader since he and Higginbottom acquired the newspaper, wrote one (edited by Hawkins) in November 2021 about his hesitancy to vaccinate his young daughter against COVID-19. Following public outcry and internal protests by staff, the Reader hired an external fact-checker to review the column; the review found more than a dozen inaccuracies. Baim subsequently offered to post the review's findings along with the column, which Goodman objected to. Goodman and his surrogates on the Reader's Board of Trustees refused to allow the newspaper's planned transition a nonprofit unless there was an investigation of censorship, and demanded Baim's resignation.

In April 2022 the newspaper's editorial union, saying the dispute threatened the future of the newspaper, mounted a public pressure campaign that culminated in protests outside of Goodman's mansion, and after two weeks of union actions, he agreed to give up ownership and allow the transfer to a nonprofit.

In June 2022, Hawkins left the Reader. That same month, following pressure from the editorial union, Baim agreed to add a note to Goodman's anti-vaccine column apologizing for it not having been "more rigorously edited." In August, Baim announced that she would resign by the end of the year. Solomon Lieberman was hired as new CEO and publisher in February 2023. Salem Collo-Julin was named editor in chief in March 2023.

In May 2024, the newspaper announced it would return to a weekly print schedule.

In January 2025, Lieberman resigned, and the RICJ announced a round of layoffs due to "a combination of financial losses, operational challenges, and external pressures [that] has brought the Reader to an imminent risk of closure."

In August 2025, the Reader was bought by Noisy Creek, a for-profit media company that owns The Stranger in Seattle and the Portland Mercury. The paper also announced it would add the company's event listing platform EverOut to its website along with its entertainment ticketing service Bold Type Tickets.

Starting at the end of 2025, the Chicago Reader switched from weekly to monthly publication and hired Sarah Conway as the new editor-in-chief. As announced, there was a one-month publication hiatus during January 2026. Then, monthly issues appeared, starting with February 4 and March, 2026, issues, each released in the first week of its respective month. Also, on March 3, 2026, the retrospective "Free Chicago: 50 Years of the Reader" book, edited by Christopher Hass, was published by the University of Illinois Press.

== Content ==
The Reader was originally designed to serve young readers, mostly singles in their 20s, who in the early 1970s lived in distinct neighborhoods along Chicago's lakefront, such as Hyde Park, Lincoln Park, and Lake View. Later this demographic group moved west, to neighborhoods like Wicker Park, Bucktown, and Logan Square, and the Reader moved with them. The paper's appeal was based on a variety of elements. Most obvious early on was a focus on pop culture for a generation who were not served by the entertainment coverage of daily newspapers. Like many alternative weeklies, the Reader relied heavily on coverage and extensive listings of arts and cultural events, especially live music, film, and theater.

As the paper prospered and its budget expanded, investigative and political reporting became another important part of the mix. Reader articles by freelance writer David Moberg are credited with helping to elect Chicago's first black mayor, the late Harold Washington. Staff writer John Conroy wrote extensively, over a period of more than 17 years, on police torture in Chicago; his reporting was instrumental in the ouster and prosecution of Commander Jon Burge, the leader of a police torture ring, and in the release of several wrongly convicted prisoners from death row.

The Reader was perhaps best known for its deep, immersive style of literary journalism, publishing long, detailed cover stories, often on subjects that had little to do with the news of the day. An oft-cited example is a 19,000-word article on beekeeping by staff editor Michael Lenehan. This article won the AAAS Westinghouse Science Journalism Award, awarded by the American Association for the Advancement of Science, in 1978. Steve Bogira's 1988 article "A Fire in the Family" used an apartment-building fire as the starting point for a 15,000-word chronicle of life among the underclass, following three generations of a west-side family and touching on urban issues such as addiction, discrimination, crime, and teen pregnancy. It won the Peter Lisagor Award for Exemplary Journalism, awarded by the Chicago Headline Club. Ben Joravsky's "A Simple Game" followed a public high school basketball team for a full year. Published in two parts, a total of 40,000 words, it was reprinted in the anthology Best American Sportswriting 1993. Contributor Lee Sandlin's two-part 1997 essay, "Losing the War," was later adapted for broadcast by the public radio show This American Life and it was anthologized in a 2007 collection, The New Kings of Nonfiction. The Reader has won 30 Alternative Newsweekly Awards since 1996.

Another element of the Reader's appeal was its free classified ads to individuals. Ads were seen as another source of information alongside the journalism and listings.

== Design and format ==
The original look of the Chicago Reader in 1971 was devised by owner-founder Bob McCamant. In 2004, a redesign by the Barcelona, Spain, firm of Jardi + Utensil introduced a new logo and extensive use of color, including a magazine-style cover. In 2007, under the ownership of Creative Loafing, the paper was converted to a single-section tabloid. In 2010, Publisher Alison Draper hired Chicago-based redesign consultant Ron Reason to help revamp the publication. Among changes introduced were a revitalized and rebranded music section titled B Side, an improvement in the paper's advertising design, quality glossy paper stock for covers and key inside spreads, and editorial destinations shepherded primarily by new editor Mara Shalhoup. A post-redesign checkup several months later revealed a robust page count, innovations in social media and reader engagement, and strong commitment from advertisers.

== Related ventures ==
"The Straight Dope", by the pseudonymous Cecil Adams, was the Chicago Reader's first weekly column and one of the first features to be widely syndicated in the alternative press, at one time appearing in 35 papers. It was started on 2 February 1973 by Michael Lenehan and later written by Dave Kehr. In 1978 it was taken over by Ed Zotti, who continued to serve as Cecil's "assistant" as of January 2010. In 1984, Chicago Review Press published The Straight Dope, a compilation of columns; the cover named Cecil Adams as author and Zotti as editor. The title was picked up and republished by Ballantine, which published four more volumes between 1988 and 1999. In 1996, The Straight Dope became a user area on AOL; a short-lived TV series, produced by Andrew Rosen, on the A&E Network; and a Web site, Straightdope.com, which was named one of PC Magazine's Top 101 Web Sites and as of January 2010 was drawing nearly 1.2 million users per month.

The Los Angeles Reader began publishing in 1978 as a wholly owned subsidiary of Chicago Reader, Inc. It was the first newspaper to publish Matt Groening's comic strip Life in Hell and David Lynch's strip The Angriest Dog in the World. Groening worked at the Los Angeles Reader for six years, first in circulation and then as a critic and assistant editor. In 1989, the paper was sold to a company headed by its founding editor, James Vowell. In 1996, it was sold to and closed by New Times Media, which later became Village Voice Media.

Various other Readers have been published, but the San Diego and Los Angeles papers are the only ones affiliated with the Chicago Reader. In the late 1970s, Chicago Reader, Inc. (CRI) sued the Twin Cities Reader for trademark infringement, arguing that the Chicago Reader had given special meaning to the name "Reader". The federal appeals court ultimately ruled that the term was "merely descriptive" and thus could not be protected as a trademark.

The East Bay Express, which serves the San Francisco Bay area, was co-founded in 1978 by Nancy Banks, a co-founder of the Chicago Reader, and editor John Raeside. Chicago Reader owners invested in the paper and eventually CRI held a major stake. The paper was sold in 2001 to New Times Media, which became Village Voice Media and in 2007 sold it to editor Stephen Buel and a group of investors.

Washington City Paper was founded in 1981 by Russ Smith and Alan Hirsch, who had founded Baltimore City Paper in 1977. Originally named 1981, the name was changed the following year.

The Reader's Guide to Arts & Entertainment was published as a suburban extension of the Chicago Reader in 1996. Before then, the Reader had avoided distribution in all but the closest suburbs of Chicago. The Reader's Guide was a scaled-down version of the Reader, printed as a one-section tabloid meant to satisfy suburban demand for Reader content and advertising. In 2007, it was closed and distribution of the complete Chicago Reader was expanded to the suburbs.

The Ruxton Group, originally called the Reader Group, was formed by CRI in 1984 as a national advertising representative for the Reader, Washington City Paper, and other large-market alternative weeklies. In 1995 the company was sold to New Times Media, which became Village Voice Media and renamed Ruxton as the Voice Media Group.

Index Newspapers is the company that publishes The Stranger in Seattle, Washington, and the Portland Mercury in Portland, Oregon. In 2002, CRI invested in Index and took a minority interest.

Quarterfold, Inc. is a company formed by most of the former owners of Chicago Reader, Inc. to succeed that company and hold assets that were not included in the sale to Creative Loafing. Quarterfold's chief asset is its ownership interest in Index Newspapers.

Amsterdam Weekly was a free, English-language weekly published in the Netherlands from May 2004 through December 2008. As of May 2010, it exists in limited form online. The paper was started by Todd Savage, who had been a writer and typesetter for the Chicago Reader in the late 1990s. The Reader was a major investor. In 2008, the paper was sold to Yuval Sigler, publisher of Time Out Tel Aviv, who with assets and staff including Savage launched Time Out Amsterdam in October 2008.
