= Paul Blanca =

Dutch photographer (1958–2021)

Paul Blanca (born Paul Vlaswinkel, 11 November 1958 – 16 October 2021) was a Dutch photographer.

== Career ==
Blanca was born in Amsterdam. His interest in photography began after he met his contemporary, Eva Veldhoen. She was the daughter of painter Aat Veldhoen. Blanca began using a small, colour camera. He then took black and white photographs using a 6 x 6 cm Hasselblad camera. In the 1980s Blanca received recognition for his violent self-portraits inspired by the works of Andres Serrano and Robert Mapplethorpe.

In 1986, Blanca's book Timing, was published. It recorded upcoming Dutch artists of the 1980s, complemented by the poems of Koos Dalstra.

In the 1990s, Blanca became a journalist for the Amsterdam Weekly; the Nieuwe Revu, and the Het Parool. In 1995, Blanca wrote an article for Nieuwe Revu which discussed the use of grenades and then became linked to an attack on Rob Scholte.

== Influences ==
Blanca was influenced by the choreographer, photographer, and photographic studio owner Hans van Manen. In van Manen’s work, Pose, Blanca played a kickboxer (Blanca had been a kickboxer in his teens) surrounded by ten ballerinas.

Mapplethorpe mentored Blanca, introducing him to New York high society, including artists such as Grace Jones, Jasper Johns, Willem de Kooning, and Keith Haring. Mapplethorpe said of Blanca,

"Paul Blanca is my only competitor.".

In "True Colors – The Real Life of the Art World" by Anthony Haden, an art collector says,

"He reaches a kind of poetry few artists have."

In 1991, Blanca collaborated with Hans Gieles and Francis Boeske of the gallery "Vous Etes Ici", to produce the series "Sangre de Toro" depicting the Spanish bullfights.

In the late 1990s, Blanca shot a series called "Mi Mattes", which depicts gang members hanging around his studio.

== Themes ==
Blanca’s self-portraits reveal strong emotions and violence expressed through fear, aggression, pain, sadness, and sexuality. However, a more sensitive side is shown in the nudes, "Mother and Son" and "Father and Son".

The theme of strong emotion is also revealed in Blanca's series "Par la Pluie des Femmes", in which he captured women in tears by having let them think about their most traumatic experiences.
