= Konkol =

Konkol is a surname. It is derived from Polish kąkol ("corncockle"). Notable people with the surname include:

- Eric Konkol (born 1976), American college basketball coach
- Mark Konkol (born 1973), American writer
