= Cara Fitzpatrick =

American journalist

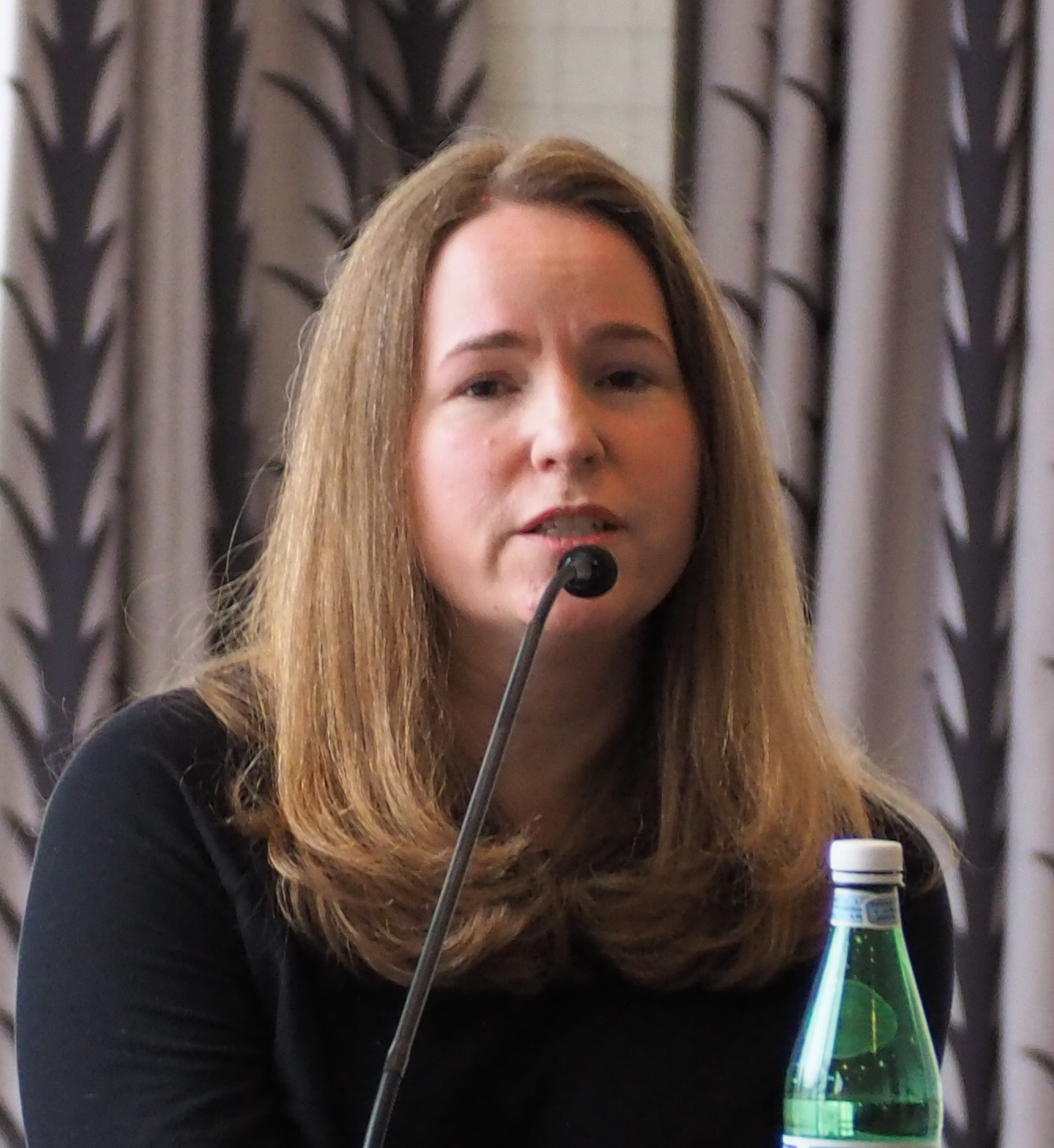
at Virginia Festival of the Book 2024

Cara Fitzpatrick is an American journalist. She won a 2016 Pulitzer Prize for Local Reporting. and 2015 George Polk Award.

== Life ==
She graduated from University of Washington, and the Columbia University School of Journalism. She worked for the Tampa Bay Times. In 2018, she was a Spencer Fellow. In 2019, she was a New Arizona Fellow. She is an editor at Chalkbeat.

In 2023, she published the book The Death of Public School: How Conservatives Won the War Over Education in America, which details the history of public education privatization since the 1960s.

She lives in New York with her husband and three children.

== Works ==
- Fitzpatrick, Cara (2023-08-22). The Death of Public School. New York: Basic Books. ISBN 978-1-5416-4677-3.
