= Frank Main =

American writer

Frank Main (born 1964) is an American Pulitzer Prize–winning reporter from Chicago, Illinois.

== Early life ==
Main was born in Glen Ridge, New Jersey, in 1964. He grew up in Tulsa, Oklahoma, and graduated from Bishop Kelley High School in 1982. He graduated from Emory University and earned a master's degree from the Medill School of Journalism at Northwestern University.

== Career ==
Main writes for the Chicago Sun-Times, focusing on crime and investigative stories.

He began his career with The Tulsa World in 1987. He later worked for the Baton Rouge State-Times, the Baton Rouge Morning Advocate, and The Kentucky Post. He has reported from conflict zones in the Persian Gulf, Bosnia and Colombia. He covered the aftermath of the Sept. 11, 2001 terror attacks and Hurricane Katrina.

Main has been an adjunct professor at Loyola University Chicago, teaching media law.

He was the host of the first season of the award-winning podcast 'Motive' produced by WBEZ Chicago and the Chicago Sun-Times in 2019.

== Awards and recognition ==
Main won the 2011 Pulitzer Prize for Local Reporting with Mark Konkol and John Kim for articles documenting violence in Chicago neighborhoods and the culture of silence that allows it to continue. The entry included two series that examined the same issue: how many assault and murder cases in Chicago go unsolved because victims, witnesses and neighbors refuse to cooperate with police. Main spent four months shadowing homicide detectives as they tried to solve the gang-related murder of a teenager only to be stymied by a "no-snitch" culture. The series showed "originality and community expertise," the judges said.

In 2017, Main won the APME national storytelling award for 'Life on a Ledge,' which detailed a suicide he witnessed in Chicago. The piece explored the life, mental illness and death of Kendra Smith.

In 2021, Main was a health journalism fellow at the University of Southern California's Annenberg School for Communication and Journalism.

== Personal life ==
Main shuttles between Chicago and Michigan with his wife, Alice.
