= Ben Joravsky =

American newspaper columnist, author

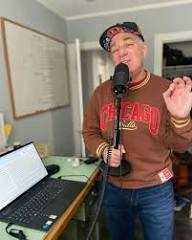
- Born: November 26, 1955 (age 70); Connecticut
- Education: Evanston Township High School
- Alma mater: Lawrence University
- Occupations: Author, journalist,
- Children: 2
- Writing career
- Years active: 1981 to present
- Period: 1977 to present
- Notable awards: 2010 Chicago Journalist of the Year 2010 Illinois Journalist of the Year
- Website: www.thebenjoravskyshow.com

Ben "Benny Jay" Joravsky (born November 26, 1955) is an American journalist, author, and podcast host known for his investigative reporting on local politics and municipal finance. He was a longtime writer for the Chicago Reader and won the 2010 Chicago Journalist of the Year Award.

== Early life and family ==
Born to Jewish American parents. David Joravsky, a history professor and Doris a public school teacher in Connecticut. Joravsky grew up in Rhode Island until the age of 13, he moved with his family to Evanston, Illinois. He attended Evanston Township High School.

He attended Lawrence University in Appleton, Wisconsin and did not start writing until his senior year of college for the student paper as a hobby.

== Career ==
Known as the people's journalist of Chicago and considered by left the Studs Terkel of the early 21st century. Joravsky moved to Chicago in 1981 and began freelancing for the Reader shortly after. He became a full-time staff writer in 1990 and has remained with the publication for most of its history, focusing on investigating power, money, and politics in Chicago. Joravsky has reported on numerous instances of local political corruption, including ghost employees, kickbacks, and other schemes.

Notable stories that Joravsky has touched on is Tax Increment Financing (TIF) abuses he is well known for his extensive and critical reporting on Chicago's TIF program. His investigations revealed how a program intended to spur development in "blighted" areas was often diverted to wealthy communities or used as a "shadow budget" with little public oversight, taking money away from schools and parks.

Chicago parking meter deal. In collaboration with Block Club Chicago Reporter Mick Dumke, Joravsky produced a multi-part investigative series titled "FAIL: The Reader's Parking Meter Investigation". The series exposed how the city under Mayor Richard M. Daley leased its 36,000 parking meters to a private group (led by Morgan Stanley) for 75 years for a fraction of their actual worth, rushing the deal through the City Council with minimal review.

Over his 40 year career Jorvasky has interviewed a diverse set of people Harold Washington, Craig Hodges, Stacey Davis Gates, Monroe Anderson, Kat Abughazaleh, Brandon Johnson, George Freeman, Karen Lewis, Steve James, Kevin Blackistone, Jerry Krause.

Joravsky published his first book in 1987 Race and Politics in Chicago, his others include 1995 Hoop Dreams The True Story of Hardship and Triumph and the 2013 fiction The Greens about Cabrini Green housing projects in the 1970s. His other memorable work is the highly acclaimed 40,000 word article A Simple Game which followed coach Manny Weincord and Roosevelt High School Rough Riders basketball team for the 1991–1992 season.

== Later work ==
From 2017 to 2018 he hosted The Ben Joravsky Show as a weekday afternoon host on WCPT AM 820, a progressive talk radio station, while continuing his work with the Reader. In 2019 the show was relaunched as a livestream and podcast, presented by the Chicago Reader and Chicago Sun-Times. In 2025, he accepted a voluntary buyout from the newspaper and continues to host the podcast. He also writes for the humor blog The Third City.

== Awards and honors ==
- Chicago Journalist of the Year Award from the Chicago Journalists Association 2010.
- Illinois Journalist of the Year Award from Northern Illinois University 2010.
- Peter Lisagor Awards from the Chicago Headline Club 2009, 2011, 2023.
- Studs Terkel Award from the Community Media Workshop Public Narrative for body of work covering Chicago's diverse communities 1995.
- AltWeekly Awards from the Association of Alternative Newsweeklies awards 2009, 2020.
- Driehaus Foundation Investigative Journalism Award for The Shadow Budget: Who Wins Daley's TIF Game 2011.
- Ron Sable Award for Activism 1995.

== Selected works ==
=== Articles ===
- Joravsky, Ben. (December 1992). A Simple Game. The Chicago Reader. Vol. 22, no. 8.
- Dumke, M & Joravsky, B. (December, 2009). Fail: The Readers Parking Meter Investigation. The Chicago Reader. Vol.39, no. 12.
- The lost Harold Washington files ( November, 2017). The Chicago Reader. Vol. 47, no. 9. Joravsky, B.

=== Books ===
- Hoop Dreams: The True Story of Hardship and Triumph (1996), ISBN 978-0-06-097689-7
- Race and Politics in Chicago (1987), ISBN 99-99-89421-6
- The Greens (2013), ISBN
