= Dave Umhoefer =

American journalist

David E. Umhoefer (born 1961) is a faculty member at Marquette University where he directs the O'Brien Fellowship for Public Service Journalism. Prior, he was a reporter for the Milwaukee Journal Sentinel. He won the 2008 Pulitzer Prize for Local Reporting for a six-month investigation of Milwaukee County's pension system, citing "his stories on the skirting of tax laws to pad pensions of county employees, prompting change and possible prosecution of key figures." The investigation exposed a corrupt, illegal scheme in which more than 350 Milwaukee County employees had increased their pensions by a collective total of over $50 million. For example, "One employee qualified for a 25% pension increase because she worked a half-day at a county park in 1978."

Umhoefer is from La Crosse, Wisconsin and he graduated from the University of Wisconsin–Madison School of Journalism & Mass Communication in 1983. He previously contributed to PolitiFact, rating the accuracy of statements by candidates for public office, elected officials, and political parties.
