= Cecilia Reyes (journalist) =

American journalist

- Born: Mexico City, Mexico
- Education: Columbia University (BA)
- Occupation: Journalist
- Employer: Insider Inc.
- Awards: Pulitzer Prize in 2022

Cecilia Reyes is a senior reporter at Insider Inc. She won the Pulitzer Prize for Local Reporting in 2022.

== Biography ==
Reyes was born and raised in Mexico City and graduated from Columbia University in 2015 with a bachelor's degree in computer science. At Columbia, she wrote for the Columbia Daily Spectator, where she broke the Nutellagate scandal surrounding the alleged student theft of Nutella from Columbia's dining halls, costing the university up to 100 pounds of Nutella a day and $5,000 per week. She was a Google Journalism and News Apps fellow at ProPublica and worked at The Boston Globe and the New York Daily News as an intern.

Reyes joined the Chicago Tribune in 2016 as a bilingual reporter on the paper's investigative team. She led a two-year investigation called "The Failures Before the Fires" with Madison Hopkins of the Better Government Association, which looked into fatal fires that exposed flaws in Chicago's building code enforcement, for which she won a Pulitzer Prize in 2022.

Reyes joined Insider Inc. in July 2022 as a senior reporter for the investigations team.
