= California Watch =

Nonprofit investigative journalism organization

- Founded: August 2009
- Dissolved: May 29, 2013
- Purpose: Investigative journalism
- Location: Berkeley, California
- Method: Foundation and member-supported
- Key people: Robert Rosenthal, Executive Director of CIR; Mark Katches, Editorial Director; Christa Scharfenberg, Associate Director of CIR; Louis Freedberg, Founding Director

California Watch, part of the nonprofit Center for Investigative Reporting, began producing stories in 2009. The official launch of the California Watch website took place in January 2010. The team was best known for producing well researched and widely distributed investigative stories on topics of interest to Californians. In small ways, the newsroom pioneered in the digital space, including listing the names of editors and copy editors at the bottom of each story, custom-editing stories for multiple partners, developing unique methods to engage with audiences and distributing the same essential investigative stories to newsrooms across the state. It worked with many news outlets, including newspapers throughout the state, all of the ABC television affiliates in California, KQED radio and television and dozens of websites. The Center for Investigative Reporting created California Watch with $3.5 million in seed funding. The team won several industry awards for its public interest reporting, including the George Polk Award in 2012. In addition to numerous awards won for its investigative reports, the California Watch website also won an Online Journalism Award in the general excellence category from the Online News Association in its first year of existence.

== History ==
In 2009, the California Watch team began creating reports on statewide issues. The team's mission was to highlight stories related to education, immigration, the environment, politics, public safety, and other areas of public interest.

At the time of its launch, California Watch had seven reporters, two multimedia producers, and two editors. Robert J. Rosenthal hired Mark Katches as the editorial director and Louis Freedberg as director. Katches had led investigative reporting teams at the Milwaukee Journal Sentinel, where he edited two Pulitzer Prize winning projects and at the Orange County Register. Freedberg was previously a reporter, Washington correspondent, editorial board member and columnist at the San Francisco Chronicle, and had reported for a wide range of outlets in both radio and print. The reporting team included Lance Williams, who uncovered the BALCO steroids in sports scandal while an investigative reporter at the San Francisco Chronicle. California Watch started with offices in Berkeley and Sacramento, California.

California Watch hired three additional reporters in mid-2010. Among them was Ryan Gabrielson, who won a Pulitzer Prize for his reporting on abusive practices in the Maricopa County Sheriff's Office. California Watch shares its editors, TV producers, multimedia producers, news applications developers, data analysts and radio production with the Center for Investigative Reporting.

In March 2010, California Watch launched the “Politics Verbatim” website created by Chase Davis. The site tracked the statements and promises of the state's candidates for governor, Meg Whitman and Jerry Brown. The site featured search tools, and users could sort statements by topic and geographic location.

Reporting targeted at younger audiences included age-specific media, such as coloring books and finger puppet videos.

California Watch merged into the Center for Investigative Reporting in May 2013.

== Investigations ==
- Majority of California's Largest Districts Eye Shorter School Year, by Louis Freedberg.
- More Women Dying from Pregnancy Complications; State Holds On to Report, by Nathanael Johnson.
- Death at San Jose Nursing Home Leaves Family in Search of Answers, by Lisa Pickoff White, in partnership with the Orange County Register, the San Jose Mercury News, Sacramental Bee, KQED and others.
- Nitrate Contamination Spreading in California Communities, by Julia Scott.
- Car Seizures at DUI Checkpoints Prove Profitable for Cities, Raise Legal Questions, by Ryan Gabrielson.
- Prime Healthcare's Treatment of Rare Ailments Stands Out, by Christina Jewett and Stephen K. Doig.
- On Shaky Ground, a three-part California Watch and KQED-TV investigation.
- Broken Shield, a series of investigations into police failures and abuses.
- Spain's High-speed Rail System Offers Lessons for California, by Tim Sheehan, part of a joint series with the Fresno Bee and news outlets around the state, on the peril and promise of bullet trains in California.
- Scrutiny of Oakland Church School Grows, by Will Evans.

== Operations model ==
The Center for Investigative Reporting, which runs California Watch, depends largely on foundation grants and individual donors. It also charges for its content. California Watch publishes content on its website and also distributes content to other news outlets, such as The San Francisco Chronicle, San Diego Union Tribune, Sacramento Bee, Orange County Register, KQED, all of the ABC TV affiliates in California and National Public Radio. California Watch has an agreement with New American Media to help distribute translated versions of the team's reports to ethnic news outlets.

Distribution is important for the success of California Watch's efforts. In the case of the story on school-district budget cuts, California Watch had 20 media partners for the story. It was distributed in print, on TV, the web, and radio.

California Watch has experimented with new ways of distributing its work. To spread the word on a story about earthquake safety at public universities, the team produced fliers. They handed out these fliers on the UC Berkeley campus, which has more unsafe buildings than any other California university. As part of the investigation into the seismic safety of K-12 schools in California, California Watch produced and distributed more than 30,000 coloring books in multiple languages, to help children learn about earthquake safety. In 2012, it partnered with the UCSF Children's Hospital to distribute 50,000 more at San Francisco's Fleet Week.

== Awards and recognition ==
In 2012, California Watch won the George Polk Award for medical reporting. Its investigation exposed fraudulent medical billing at Prime Healthcare Services. California Watch was the only nonprofit organization on the list of winners. Lance Williams and Christina Jewett were the lead reporters on the investigation.

In 2010, California Watch initiated the “Open Newsroom” project. The team works from coffee houses and other public areas with free Wi-Fi. Director Mark Katches envisioned the open newsroom as a way to engage with the local community. In June 2012, California Watch partnered with KQED to hold a series of five open newsrooms around the San Francisco Bay Area.

The far-reaching “On Shaky Ground” investigation was a finalist for a Pulitzer Prize in 2012. In 2011, the story earned the Roy W. Howard Award and a $10,000 grant from the Scripps Howard Foundation.

The Northern California Chapter of the Society of Professional Journalists awarded California Watch a Journalism Innovation award in 2011. In the previous year, the society named the group Journalist of the Year.

The Broken Shield series of investigations into police failures and abuses picked up the Online News Association’s Gannett Foundation Award for Innovative Investigative Journalism in 2012. California Watch was nominated for four ONA awards in 2011.
