= Rob Kuznia =

American journalist

- Born: c. 1975; North Dakota, U.S.
- Occupation: Journalist
- Employer: CNN
- Notable work: Reporting on Centinela Valley Unified School District
- Awards: Pulitzer Prize for Local Reporting (2015)

Rob Kuznia (born 1975) is an American journalist who was awarded the Pulitzer Prize for Local Reporting in 2015 for his work at the Daily Breeze. He is currently an investigative reporter for CNN.

== Early life and education ==
Kuznia was born in North Dakota and raised in Grand Forks. He is a graduate of Red River High School and delivered newspapers for the Grand Forks Herald. He attended the University of Minnesota Twin Cities, where he wrote for The Minnesota Daily and majored in journalism.

== Career ==
Kuznia's career has spanned several news organizations, often focusing on local and investigative reporting. His early career included working at the Santa Barbara News-Press where he was reportedly involved in union organizing efforts. He also spent time at Noozhawk from 2007 to 2009. During this period, and later, he also contributed as a freelance writer to publications such as Hispanic Business Magazine and Pacific Standard (formerly Miller-McCune Magazine).

He joined the Daily Breeze, a newspaper based in Torrance, California, in 2010. It was during his tenure there that he undertook the investigative work that would later earn him a Pulitzer Prize. His series of articles exposed how the Centinela Valley Unified School District, despite receiving millions in state funds, was mired in financial mismanagement, leading to significant cuts in student programs and teacher layoffs. His reporting revealed questionable spending practices, cronyism, and a lack of accountability within the district, including a superintendent's salary that approached $700,000 annually.

In August 2014, Kuznia left the Daily Breeze to take a position as a communications manager at the University of Southern California (USC) Shoah Foundation, citing financial instability in the newspaper industry. Despite this career change, he remained eligible for the Pulitzer Prize for his work completed in 2014.

=== Pulitzer Prize ===
In April 2015, Rob Kuznia, along with Rebecca Kimitch and Frank Suraci, was awarded the Pulitzer Prize for Local Reporting for their work with the Daily Breeze. The Pulitzer board cited their "painstakingly reported series that exposed widespread corruption in a tiny, cash-strapped school district, leading to staff firings, criminal charges and state intervention." Kuznia's specific contributions to the series were highlighted as instrumental in uncovering the depth of the district's financial woes, leading to the superintendent's dismissal, removal of board members, and an FBI investigation.

== Later career ==
While working in public relations at USC, Kuznia also continued to write freelance enterprise stories, notably for The Washington Post. He also co-developed and taught a course on documenting mass shootings at USC Annenberg. As of 2020, he joined CNN as an investigative reporter, based in Minneapolis, Minnesota.

In 2022, Kuznia was nominated for an Emmy Award as a Senior Writer for CNN's "The Death of a Friendship: Inside the Jan. 6 Capitol Attack" in the category of Outstanding Interactive Media.

== Awards and recognition ==
- 2015 Pulitzer Prize for Local Reporting (with Rebecca Kimitch and Frank Suraci) – for reporting on the Centinela Valley Unified School District.
- 2022 Emmy Award Nomination for Outstanding Interactive Media (as a Senior Writer for CNN's "The Death of a Friendship: Inside the Jan. 6 Capitol Attack").
- Scripps Howard National Award (co-recipient)
- California Newspaper Publishers Association (CNPA) Award
