= Robert Jon Rosenthal =

Robert Jon "Rosey" Rosenthal
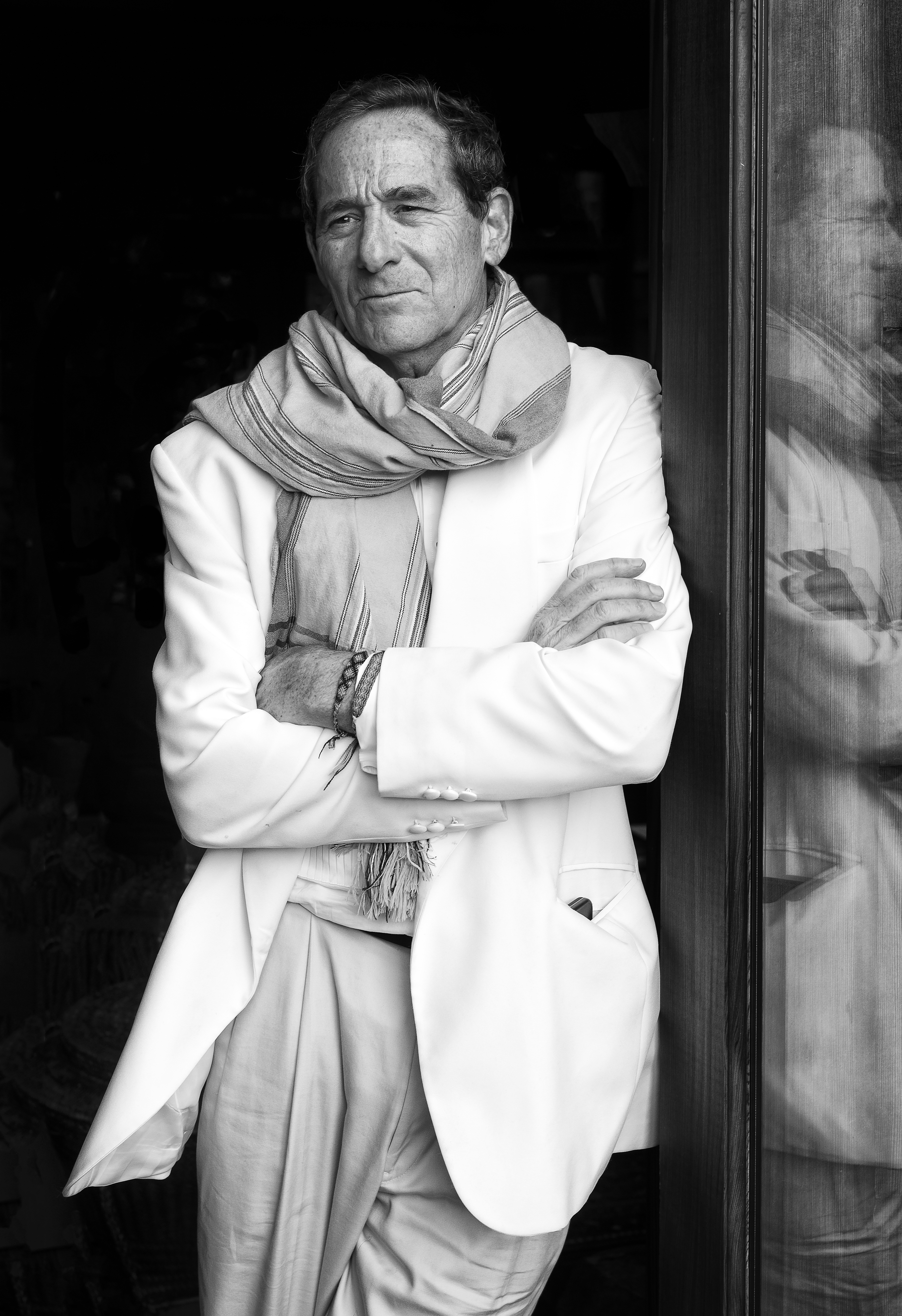
- Rosenthal in 2018
- Born: August 5, 1948 (age 77)
- Education: University of Vermont
- Occupations: Journalist, editor
- Spouse: Inez Katherina von Sternenfels (1985–2013)
- Children: 3
- Parent(s): Irving Rosenthal, Ruth Moss

Robert Jon "Rosey" Rosenthal (born 1948) is a journalist, former editor of The Philadelphia Inquirer and managing editor of the San Francisco Chronicle. Rosenthal currently holds the position of executive director of the Center for Investigative Reporting. He is known for his work as an investigative reporter and foreign correspondent. As an African correspondent for The Philadelphia Inquirer, Rosenthal won several journalism awards, including the Sigma Delta Chi Award for Distinguished Foreign Correspondence.

== Early life ==
Rosenthal is the son of Irving Rosenthal and Ruth Moss. His father, Irving, was Professor of English and communication at the City College of New York; he created the first two journalism classes at the college in 1936.

Rosenthal has two siblings: David, of Atlanta, Georgia, and Risa Finkel, of Huntington, New York.

== Career ==
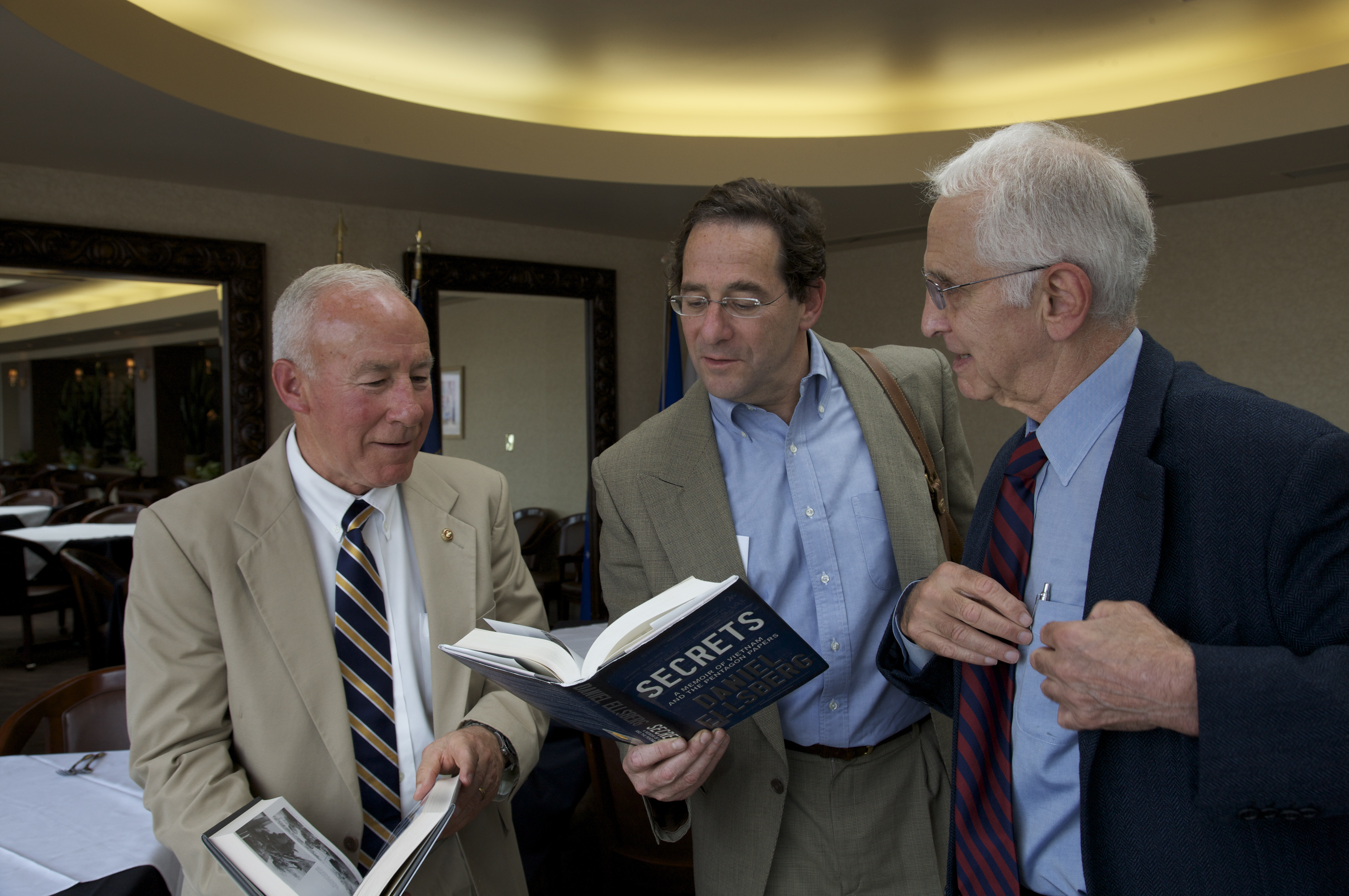
Rosenthal with J. Michael Myatt (left) and Daniel Ellsberg (2008)

After graduating from the University of Vermont, where he was a member of the 1970 E.C.A.C. Division II championship ice hockey team, Rosenthal went to work as a news assistant for The New York Times. In the spring of 1971, he was an editorial assistant on the team that produced the Pentagon Papers, which exposed American activities in Southeast Asia. He worked for the paper from 1970 to 1973. From 1974 to 1979, he was a reporter for The Boston Globe.

In 1979, he took a new job as reporter for The Philadelphia Inquirer, where he stayed for 22 years. Starting on the city desk, he became the paper’s Africa correspondent in 1982, and also covered conflicts in Lebanon and Israel. He returned to Philadelphia in 1986 and became the paper’s foreign editor. During his five-year tenure as foreign editor, his staff won two Pulitzer Prizes. In 1991, Rosenthal became the city editor.

He became the paper’s executive editor on January 1, 1998. At the time, the Inquirer was the 16th-largest daily newspaper in the United States. During his term, he witnessed staff cuts and money-saving changes to the reporting process, including shorter stories and smaller photographs. Rosenthal left the Inquirer in late 2001.

He then taught classes at Columbia University’s Graduate School of Journalism. On September 11, 2002, he became managing editor for the San Francisco Chronicle. He left that position in June 2007.

In 2007, Rosenthal became the executive editor of The Chauncey Bailey Project, a team of journalists working for news outlets throughout the San Francisco Bay Area, tasked with investigating the murder of Oakland Post editor Chauncey Bailey.

In January 2008, he became executive director of the Center for Investigative Reporting, a nonprofit investigative news agency. Since then, he has overseen the growth of the organization to what in 2012 was the largest nonprofit investigative reporting organization in the country, with a staff of 70 and budget of $11 million.

== Awards and recognition ==
In 1983, Rosenthal received the Third World Reporting Award from the National Association of Black Journalists. In 1986, Rosenthal received the Overseas Press Club Award for magazine writing, the Sigma Delta Chi Award for distinguished foreign correspondence, and was a Pulitzer Prize finalist in international reporting.

While Rosenthal was managing editor, the San Francisco Chronicle won a Pulitzer Prize for its feature photography. The paper also received the prestigious George Polk Award for its investigative reporting of the BALCO labs and performance-enhancing drugs scandal. From 2002 to 2005, 14 sports writers at the Chronicle were finalists for the Associated Press Sports Editors national award, more than any other paper with a comparable circulation.

While Rosenthal was editor, the Chauncey Bailey Project won awards from Investigative Reporters and Editors, the Online News Association and the National Association of Black Journalists, among others.

The Center for Investigative Reporting has won Society of Professional Journalists Awards, Investigative Reporters and Editors Awards, a Scripps Howard Award, The George Polk Award, and The MacArthur Award for Creative and Effective Institutions. CIR was a Pulitzer Prize finalist in 2012.

== Personal life ==
Rosenthal married Inez Katherina von Sternenfels on November 22, 1985. They have three children together: Adam, Benjamin, and Ariella.
