= The Center for Investigative Reporting =

Non-profit organisation in the US

- Formation: 1977
- Type: 501(c)(3) organization
- Tax ID no.: 94-2282759
- Purpose: Investigative journalism
- Method: Foundation and member-supported
- Key people: Monika Bauerlein, CEO; Clara Jeffery, Editor-in-Chief
- Website: cir.org

The Center for Investigative Reporting (CIR) is a nonprofit news organization based in San Francisco, California.

CIR was founded in 1977 as nonprofit investigative journalism organization. It subsequently grew into a multi-platform newsroom, with its flagship distribution platform being Reveal.

In February 2024, CIR merged with Mother Jones. The merged nonprofit newsroom (also called CIR) produces Mother Jones, Reveal, More To The Story, their newsletters, digital, social, and video channels, and documentary films.

== History ==
=== Founding ===
David Weir, Dan Noyes, and Lowell Bergman founded The Center for Investigative Reporting in 1977. This was the second nonprofit news organization in the United States (after Mother Jones) to focus on investigative reporting.

=== 1980s ===
In 1982, reporters from the center worked with Mother Jones magazine to report testing fraud in consumer products. The investigation won several awards, including Sigma Delta Chi and Investigative Reporters and Editors awards.

CIR began producing television documentaries in 1980. It has since produced more than 30 documentaries for Frontline and Frontline/World, dozens of reports for other television outlets, and three independent feature documentaries. ABC’s 20/20 and CBS’s 60 Minutes have featured reporting from CIR. Major investigations in the 1980s resulted in reporting of the toxicity of ordinary consumer products, an exposé of nuclear accidents in the world's navies, and coverage of questionable tactics by the FBI during the administration of President Ronald Reagan.

=== 1990s ===
In 1990, CIR produced its first independent TV documentary, Global Dumping Ground, reported by Bill Moyers on PBS’s Frontline. The film spurred federal investigations and was rebroadcast in at least 18 nations.

In 1992, CIR produced The Best Campaign Money Can Buy for Frontline, an investigation of the top funders of that year's presidential campaign. It featured correspondent Robert Krulwich, and was produced by Stephen Talbot with reporters Eve Pell and Dan Noyes. The documentary won a DuPont/Columbia Journalism Award.

Other notable CIR reports included an investigation of General Motors, one on the rise of conservative media figure Rush Limbaugh and another on Congressman Newt Gingrich (R-Georgia), as well as a study of education and race in an urban high school, School Colors. An investigation for the New York Daily News and FOX's Front Page revealed lethal dangers in a common diet drug.

=== 2000s ===
In 2005, the center's investigations into wiretapping and data mining stimulated Congressional hearings on privacy issues. The center also exposed the forensic practices of the FBI that resulted in wrongful convictions and imprisonments.

Robert Jon Rosenthal became executive director of the center in 2007. He had more than thirty years of experience as a journalist and editor at the San Francisco Chronicle, The Philadelphia Inquirer, The Boston Globe, and The New York Times. Rosenthal hired Mark Katches as the editorial director of the start-up news organization called California Watch in 2009. Katches would later be named editorial director for all of CIR, a position he held until 2014, when he left to become the editor and vice president of content at The Oregonian, in Portland Oregon.

=== 2010s ===
In 2010, the center released the documentary film, Dirty Business. It explored problems with the myth of clean coal and the extensive lobbying tactics of the coal industry.

The organization's reports have been published in news outlets around the country and in California including NPR News, PBS Frontline, PBS NEWSHOUR, Los Angeles Times, The Washington Post, San Francisco Chronicle, The Sacramento Bee, The Daily Beast, Salon, Al Jazeera English, and American Public Media's Marketplace.

In April 2012, it partnered with Google to host TechRaking, an informal conference that brought together journalists and technologists. In September 2012, the second TechRaking brought together journalists and gamers, at IGN in San Francisco.

CIR announced a partnership with Univision News in 2012 to bring investigative stories to Hispanic households in the United States.

CIR acquired The Bay Citizen in 2012. In 2013 The Bay Citizen and California Watch merged into the CIR brand.

The CIR film "Heroin(e)" is a 2017 Netflix documentary that follows three women working to break the cycle of drug abuse in Huntington, West Virginia, where the overdose rate is 10 times the national average. The film was nominated for an Academy Award in the category of Best Documentary Short Subject.

=== 2020s ===
The film The Grab which premiered in 2022 at the Toronto International Film Festival documented the work of CIR journalists as they investigated nations competitive efforts to secure arable land, often far from their own country. Filmmaker Gabriela Cowperthwaite directed the film and co-produced it with CIR journalist Nate Halverson, who is also prominently featured in the movie.

In 2023, the film Victim/Suspect premiered as an official selection of the 2023 Sundance Film Festival in the U.S. Documentary Competition, and started streaming on Netflix in May 2023.

In 2024, CIR merged with the publishers of the magazine Mother Jones in a move that was viewed as stabilizing and diversifying the organization's revenue stream. Technically, the old CIR was dissolved and the organization that publishes Mother Jones renamed itself the Center for Investigative Reporting.

== Projects ==
=== California Watch and merger with The Bay Citizen ===
In 2009, The Center for Investigative Reporting created California Watch, a reporting team dedicated to state-focused stories. Its website launched in 2010. The site acted as a watchdog team focusing on government oversight, criminal justice, education, health, and the environment. In 2010, the Online News Association honored California Watch with a general excellence award. In 2012, California Watch won the George Polk Award for its series on Medicare billing fraud. California Watch also was a Pulitzer finalist for its On Shaky Ground series. The series detailed flaws in state oversight of seismic safety at K-12 schools. The On Shaky Ground reporting team won a Scripps Howard National Journalism Award for Public Service. California Watch won a second Polk award in 2012, this time for Ryan Gabrielson's series about the failures of a unique police force to solve crimes committed against the developmentally disabled living in state board-and-care hospitals. The series also won an Online Journalism Award from the Online News Association. In 2013, California Watch was named a Pulitzer Prize finalist for a report about violence in homes for developmentally disabled people.

In April 2012 CIR merged with The Bay Citizen, a nonprofit, investigative news group based in San Francisco.

=== Reveal YouTube Channel ===
In August 2012, The Center for Investigative Reporting created "The I Files" channel on YouTube. The Knight Foundation provided grant funding to make the channel possible. The channel, renamed as Reveal, presents investigative videos produced by CIR and from a variety of news outlets, including The New York Times, BBC, Al Jazeera English, ABC News, National Public Radio, and member organizations of the Investigative News Network.

=== Awards and recognition ===
In 2012, CIR received the MacArthur Award for Creative and Effective Leadership. The award was a monetary prize from the John D. and Catherine T. MacArthur Foundation. CIR received a prize of $1 million. Executive Director Robert Rosenthal explained that the money would go toward new forms of video distribution.

CIR stories received numerous journalism awards, including the Gerald Loeb Award, the Edward R. Murrow Award, the Hillman Prize, the Alfred I. duPont-Columbia University Silver Baton, the George Polk Award, Emmy Award, Scripps Howard Award, the Sigma Delta Chi Award (from the Society of Professional Journalists), and numerous Investigative Reporters and Editors Awards. The Reveal radio show and podcast received a Peabody Award in 2013 for "The VA's Opiate Overload" and in 2018 for “Kept Out” and “Monumental Lies.” The film Heroin(e), on the opioid epidemic in West Virginia, was nominated for an Academy Award for best documentary short in 2018.

CIR was a finalist for the Pulitzer Prize six times. In 2012, "On Shaky Ground," an investigation into seismic safety in California public schools, was a finalist for the Pulitzer Prize in Local Reporting. In 2013, “Broken Shield,” an investigation into California state police's inability to solve crimes against severely disabled patients at state developmental centers, was a finalist for the Pulitzer Prize in Public Service. In 2018, “All Work, No Pay,” a major investigation into work camps operating under the guise of drug rehabilitation facilities, was a finalist for the Pulitzer Prize for National Reporting. In 2019, “Kept Out,” an investigation on Redlining in the mortgage industry, was a finalist for the Pulitzer Prize in Explanatory Reporting. CIR was a finalist in Explanatory Reporting again, in 2020, for “Amazon: Behind the Smiles,” an investigation into high worker injury rates in Amazon warehouses. and in 2025, for "40 Acres and A Lie," an investigation about how the federal government gave land to formerly enslaved people but then reclaimed it.

== Notable investigations ==
- In "Mississippi Goddam", a 2021 serial podcast, CIR found new details that shed doubt on the investigation into the 2008 death of a Black teenage football star, Billey Joe Johnson Jr. The podcast was included in Rolling Stone's "The 10 Best Crime Podcasts of 2021" and Spotify's "Best Episodes of 2021".
- For "The Disappeared", a 2020 investigation into migrant children kept in long-term custody by the U.S. government, Reveal sued the federal government to find evidence that the government held refugee children in custody for far longer than was previously known, including one girl who was held for more than six years even though her family was ready to take her in. All told, Reveal found, the government held nearly 1,000 migrant children for longer than one year since fall 2014. This investigation won the IRE FOI Award and the Hillman Prize for Web Journalism.
- In "American Rehab", a 2020 serial podcast, Reveal showed how U.S. drug rehabilitation facilities built their business model on using unpaid labor from their participants. The investigation led to federal and class-action lawsuits and a Government Accountability Office investigation, and won an IRE Award, an Edward R. Murrow Award, and a Gerald Loeb Award.
- The tell-tale hearts (2020) exposed how unborn babies' hearts are at risk from the use of trichloroethylene (TCE). The investigation exposed how the Trump administration bowed to chemical companies' 20-year efforts to discredit the solid science linking the dangerous chemical to fetal heart defects. As a result of CIR's reporting, the EPA's Science Advisory Committee on Chemicals called for an investigation, and New York passed a bill banning TCE.
- "Behind the Smiles" is a multi-part investigation, ongoing since 2019, into the consequences of Amazon's relentless drive for domination. It uncovered Amazon's workplace safety crisis and how the company profoundly misled the public, press and lawmakers about it. The reporting has also shown how the company failed to protect user and business data, resulting in serious data security incidents that affected customers and small businesses. The investigation won the IRE Award in Radio/Audio, the Society of American Business Editors and Writers Best in Business Award, and a Gerald Loeb Award for business journalism. It was a finalist for the Pulitzer Prize in Explanatory Reporting.
- In 2018, Reveal's "Kept Out" investigation uncovered how modern-day redlining continues to exist in communities across the country. Based on an analysis of 31 million mortgage loan records, the reporters found evidence that banks continued to discriminate against Latino and African American homeowners across the country. The investigation won the duPont Award, the Selden Ring Award for Investigative Reporting, the Sigma Delta Chi Award for Public Service in TV Journalism, the Edward R. Murrow Award for Excellence in Social Media, and a George Peabody Award. It was a finalist for the Pulitzer Prize in Explanatory Reporting.
- "The Office of Missing Children" (2018) is an acclaimed animated video that provided the unique perspective of a child and mother who were forcibly separated under President Donald Trump's “zero tolerance” policy. Built on Reveal's immigration reporting, the video is a Vimeo staff pick and won the Animayo International Film Festival Social Awareness Award, the Edward R. Murrow Award for Feature Reporting, and the National Headliner Award for Online Video.
- "Heroin(e)" is a 2017 Netflix documentary that follows three women working to break the cycle of drug abuse in Huntington, West Virginia, where the overdose rate is 10 times the national average. The film was nominated for an Academy Award in the category of Best Documentary Short Subject.
- "Rape on the Night Shift" (2015), a joint investigation by Reveal, Frontline, Univision, the Investigative Reporting Program at UC Berkeley Graduate School of Journalism and KQED, uncovered the sexual abuse of immigrant women who "clean the malls where you shop, banks where you do business, and offices where you work." The documentary won the Sigma Delta Chi Award for Online Investigative Reporting, the IRE Award for Broadcast/Video, and the Society of Professional Journalists Northern California Chapter award for Investigative Reporting in TV/video.
- "The Dark Side of the Strawberry" is a 2014 series that used data, government documents, and community engagement to expose the dangerous pesticides required to grow strawberries to meet market demand. The investigation was awarded the Al Neuharth Innovation in Investigative Journalism award from the Online News Association.
- In "The Man Who Killed Osama Bin Laden…Is Screwed", published in 2013 by Esquire, Phil Bronstein interviews the Navy SEAL officer about being sent to kill Al-Qaeda leader Bin Laden and how that mission reshaped his life.
