= American Anarchy =

2023 book by Michael Willrich

- Author: Michael Willrich
- Genre: Non-fiction
- Publisher: Basic Books
- Publication date: 31 October 2023
- Pages: 480
- ISBN: 9781541697379

American Anarchy is a 2023 book by historian Michael Willrich. The book describes the early 20th-century American anarchist movement, with a focus on the anarchists Alexander Berkman and Emma Goldman. The book was a finalist for the 2024 Pulitzer Prize for History.

== Awards ==
Awards for American Anarchy
Year	Award	Result	Ref.
2024	Pulitzer Prize for History	Shortlisted	
