= Jim Schaefer =

American journalist

- Education: Ohio State University
- Occupation: Journalist
- Awards: George Polk Award (2008); Pulitzer Prize (2009)

Jim Schaefer is an American journalist based in Detroit, Michigan, where he works as an investigative journalist for the Detroit Free Press.

== Life and career ==
Schaefer graduated from Ohio State University. He was an investigative producer for WXYZ-TV.

While writing for the Detroit Free Press in 2012, he led an investigation into the synthetic opioid drug fentanyl.

With the Detroit Free Press, Schaefer was one member of a team that covered Detroit Mayor Kwame Kilpatrick, and uncovered the scandals that led to his 2008 resignation from office and criminal conviction. To break the case open, the reporters filed a Freedom of Information Act lawsuit that was heard by the Michigan Supreme Court. The Detroit Free Press staff, which notably included contributors Schaefer and M.L. Elrick, shared the 2009 Pulitzer Prize for Local Reporting, which cited the staff's "uncovering of a pattern of lies by Mayor Kwame Kilpatrick that included denial of a sexual relationship with his female chief of staff, prompting an investigation of perjury that eventually led to jail terms for the two officials."

== Awards ==
- 2009 Pulitzer Prize for Journalism
- 2009 1st Amendment Watchdog Award
- 2008 George Polk Award
- 2008 Worth Bingham Prize for Investigative Journalism
- 2008 Nancy Dickerson Whitehead Award for Excellence in Reporting on Drug and Alcohol Problems.
