= City Bureau =

American non-profit organization

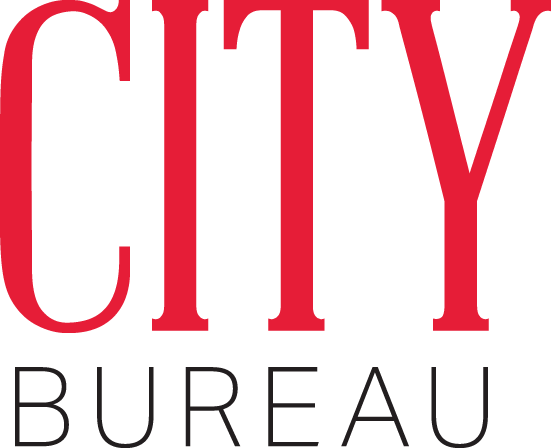
- Founded: 2015; 11 years ago
- Type: 501(c)(3)
- Purpose: Civic journalism
- Location: South Side, Chicago, Illinois, United States
- Region served: Chicago, Illinois
- Key people: Andrea Hart, co-founder, Engagement; Bettina Chang, co-founder, Editorial; Darryl Holliday, co-founder, News Lab; Harry Backlund, co-founder, Operations
- Website: www.citybureau.org

City Bureau is an American non-profit organization based in the South Side of Chicago, Illinois. It is a non-profit newsroom with a stated mission "to equip every community with the tools it needs to eliminate information inequity to further liberation, justice and self-determination." It was founded in 2015.

== History ==
City Bureau was founded in October 2015 by Bettina Chang, Andrea Hart, Darryl Holliday, Harry Backlund. Its goal was to help address the lack of news coverage of Chicago's South and West Sides as well as the lack of diversity in newsrooms. It received early grants from Illinois Humanities and the McCormick Foundation and in 2018 was awarded a $1 million grant from the MacArthur Foundation.

City Bureau has trained over 80 journalists a and co-published articles with a number of different journalism outlets.

City Bureau won the March 2016 Sidney Award. City Bureau has also won an Online Journalism Awards for their Documenters.org project, and in 2025 received $1,250,000 from Press Forward.

== Projects ==
=== Documenters ===
Through the Documenters program, City Bureau trains and pays community members to attend local government meetings and report back on them. As of October 2019, over 1000 people had enrolled in the program. In conjunction, City Bureau has helped to develop a City Scrapers toolkit, an open-source tool for gathering and standardizing information about all of the different public meetings in a city. The program has also expanded beyond Chicago with a pilot program in Detroit.

=== Police accountability ===
Much of City Bureau's early reporting and community outreach focused on police accountability. They co-published stories with newspapers including The Guardian and the Chicago Reader about misinformation in the aftermath of police shootings. The latter article focused on the role that the Chicago Fraternal Order of Police played in shaping the narrative around shootings involving members of the Chicago Police Department and won a Sidney Award for outstanding investigative journalism. When the Chicago Police Accountability Task Force published their lengthy report following the murder of Laquan McDonald, City Bureau and several Documenters partnered with the Invisible Institute and Smart Chicago Collaborative to generate an annotated version of the report that readers could then contribute their own stories overtop.
