= Ryan Gabrielson =

American journalist

- Alma mater: University of Arizona
- Employer: ProPublica
- Awards: George Polk Awards (2012); Pulitzer Prize for Local Reporting (2009); The Sidney Award (2009)

Ryan Gabrielson is an American investigative journalist. He has won a George Polk Award, and Pulitzer Prize for Local Reporting.

== Education ==
He graduated from the University of Arizona.

== Career ==
Gabrielson began his career in journalism at The Monitor in McAllen, Texas. He reported for the East Valley Tribune in Mesa, Arizona. In 2009 and 2010 he was a fellow in the Investigative Reporting Program at University of California, Berkeley Graduate School of Journalism, which supports investigative reporters "in an era of cutbacks at major news organizations". As of 2013 he worked for California Watch and the Center for Investigative Reporting as a public safety reporter. Gabrielson reported on an in-house police force at California's board-and-care institutions for the disabled. Through this work, he exposed how officers "routinely failed to do basic work on criminal cases" such as suspicious deaths.

For the East Valley Tribune in 2008, Gabrielson and Paul Giblin investigated the immigration-enforcement operations of the Maricopa County Sheriff's Office. For that investigation they won the 2009 Pulitzer Prize for Local Reporting which cited "their adroit use of limited resources to reveal, in print and online, how a popular sheriff's focus on immigration enforcement endangered investigation of violent crime and other aspects of public safety." (Giblin had been laid off in Tribune cutbacks at the turn of the year, and Gabrielson announced his departure for the Berkeley fellowship in the summer of 2009.)

An associate of a top official at the Maricopa County Sheriff's Department in 2014 unsuccessfully sued Gabrielson for defamation.

== Awards ==
- 2008 George Polk Award
- 2009 Pulitzer Prize
- Online Journalism Award for investigative reporting
- Sigma Delta Chi Award
