= Michael Willrich =

American historian

- Education: Yale University (BA); University of Chicago (MA, PhD)
- Occupation: Historian
- Employer: Brandeis University

Michael Willrich is an American historian. He is the Leff Families Professor of History at Brandeis University, and the author of three books. He was a Guggenheim Fellow in 2015. His book, American Anarchy was a finalist for the 2024 Pulitzer Prize for History.

== Selected works ==
- Willrich, Michael (2003). City of Courts: Socializing Justice in Progressive Era Chicago. New York: Cambridge University Press. ISBN 9780521794039. OCLC 51271734.
- Willrich, Michael (2014). Pox: An American History. New York: Penguin Books. ISBN 9781101476222. OCLC 883371074.
- Willrich, Michael (2023). American Anarchy: The Epic Struggle Between Immigrant Radicals and the US Government at the Dawn of the Twentieth Century. New York: Basic Books. ISBN 9781541697379. OCLC 1370003362.

== City of Courts ==
City of Courts was published in 2003 by Cambridge University Press. The book is a history of Chicago's court system during the Progressive Era. Willrich describes the city's courts as instruments of social reform that shifted from traditional neutral arbiters of discrete cases into reformers who could intervene more directly in society. In the first decades of the 20th century, Chicago's court system reorganized with business principles and grew by hiring specialized staff, like mental health professionals and social scientists. Willrich argues that progressives of the time "believed that the state should actively manage social problems and that certain aspects of social life were too important to leave either to the market or to the initiative of private citizens."
