= M. L. Elrick =

American journalist (born 1968)

- Born: Michael L. Elrick; 1968 (age 57–58)
- Education: Michigan State University (BJ)
- Occupation: Journalist
- Children: 2
- Awards: George Polk Award (2008); Pulitzer Prize for Local Reporting (2009)

Michael L. Elrick (born 1968) is an American journalist based in Detroit, Michigan, where he has worked for the Detroit Free Press and for WJBK-TV.

Elrick attended the Grosse Pointe school system; attending Defer Elementary, Pierce Middle, and graduated from GP South High in 1985. Elrick graduated from Michigan State University in 1990 with a Bachelor of Journalism degree. He wrote for the Concord (N.H.) Monitor, and Daily Southtown in Chicago. His work has appeared in The New York Times, Newsday, Investigative Reporters and Editors Journal, Salon.com, Rollingstone.com, the National Law Journal, Chicago Magazine and Hour Detroit magazine. He teaches journalism at Wayne State University, Michigan State, and University of Michigan-Dearborn.

With the Detroit Free Press Elrick was one member of a team that covered Detroit Mayor Kwame Kilpatrick, and uncovered the scandals that led to his 2008 resignation from office and criminal conviction. Elrick and other reporters filed a Freedom of Information Act lawsuit that was heard by the Michigan Supreme Court. The Detroit Free Press staff, which notably included contributors Elrick and Jim Schaefer, shared the 2009 Pulitzer Prize for Local Reporting, which cited the staff's "uncovering of a pattern of lies by Mayor Kwame Kilpatrick that included denial of a sexual relationship with his female chief of staff, prompting an investigation of perjury that eventually led to jail terms for the two officials."

Elrick was a news reporter for both stations Fox-2 and WDIV Channel 4 in Detroit. He was considering a run for Detroit City Council in 2021.

He is married and has two children.

== Awards ==
- 2009 Pulitzer Prize for Journalism
- 2009 1st Amendment Watchdog Award
- 2008 George Polk Award
- 2008 Associated Press Managing Editors Public Service Award
- 2008 Worth Bingham Prize for Investigative Reporting.
- 2005 Clark Mollenhoff Award for Investigative Reporting
