= Milwaukee Journal Sentinel =

Newspaper based in Milwaukee, Wisconsin

- Front page of the Milwaukee Journal Sentinel
- Type: Daily newspaper
- Format: Broadsheet
- Owner: USA Today Co.
- Publisher: Andy Fisher
- Founded: 1837 (Sentinel); 1882 (Journal); 1995 (Journal Sentinel)
- Circulation: 25,000 average print circulation 60,271 digital subscribers.
- ISSN: 1082-8850
- OCLC number: 55506548
- Website: jsonline.com

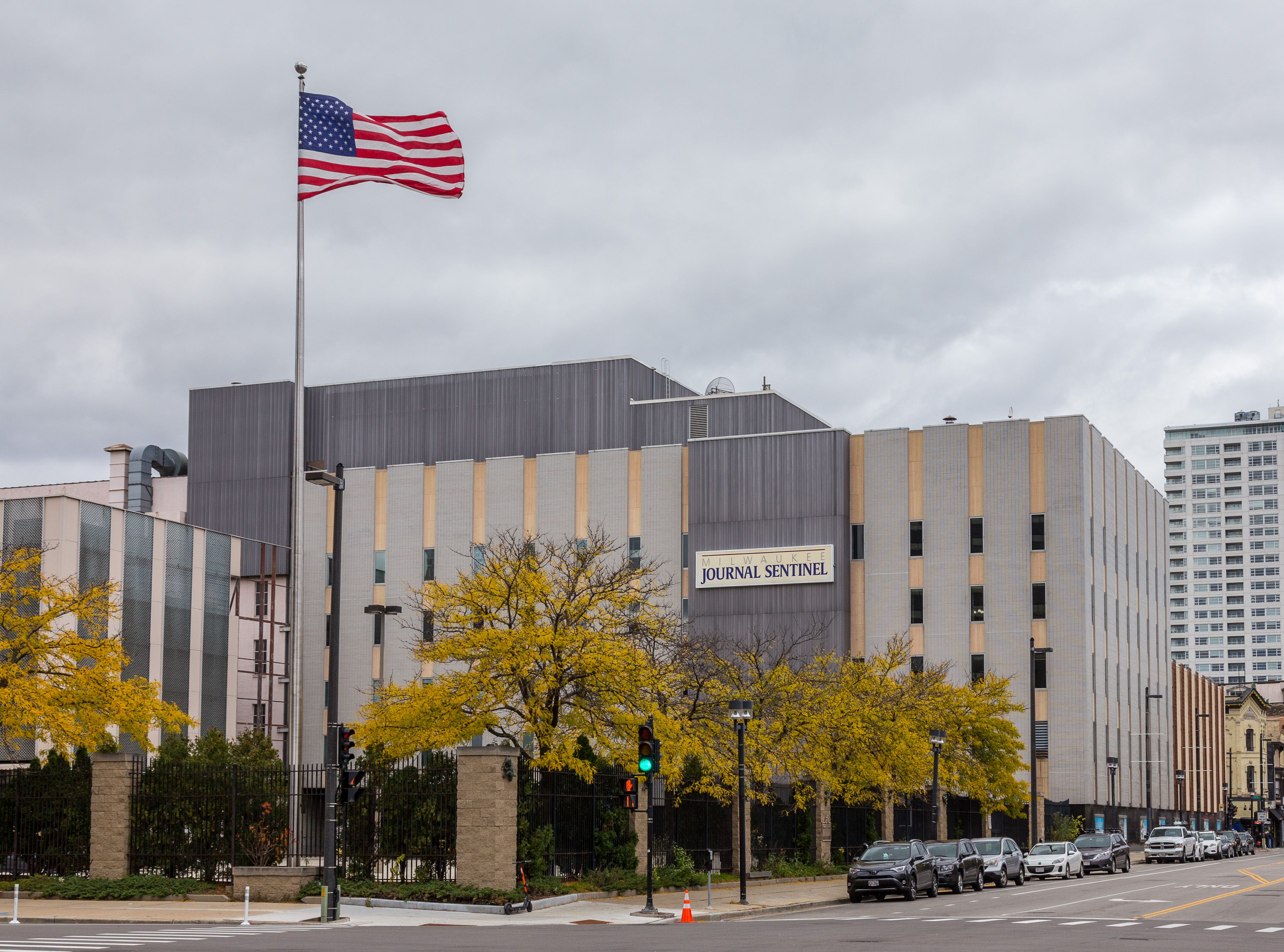
Milwaukee Journal Sentinel building

The Milwaukee Journal Sentinel is a daily morning broadsheet printed in Milwaukee, Wisconsin, where it is the primary newspaper and also the largest newspaper in the state of Wisconsin, where it is widely read. It was purchased by the Gannett Company in 2016.

In early 2003, the Milwaukee Journal Sentinel began printing at a new facility in West Milwaukee. In September 2006, the Journal Sentinel announced it had "signed a five-year agreement to print the national edition of USA Today for distribution in the northern and western suburbs of Chicago and the eastern half of Wisconsin".

== History ==
=== Milwaukee Sentinel ===
The Milwaukee Sentinel was founded on June 27, 1837, in response to disparaging statements made about the east side of town by Byron Kilbourn's westside partisan newspaper, the Milwaukee Advertiser, during the city's "bridge wars", a period when the two sides of town fought for dominance. A co-founder of Milwaukee, Solomon Juneau, provided the starting funds for editor John O'Rourke, a former office assistant at the Advertiser, to start the paper.

On Juneau's request, O'Rourke's associate, Harrison Reed, remained to take over the Sentinel's operations on behalf of Democratic Party politician James Duane Doty. Reed continued the struggle to keep the paper ahead of its debts, often printing pleas to his advertisers and subscribers to pay their bills any way they could. Meanwhile, the establishment of the Whig party in the territory thrust the Sentinel into partisan politics. In 1840 Reed was assaulted by individuals whom the Sentinel charged were hired by Democratic Governor Henry Dodge. When Doty backed William Henry Harrison, the Sentinel endorsed Harrison for president in the 1840 election.

Starr guarded the Sentinel's position as the sole Whig organ in Milwaukee. Heavily in debt, he secured the partnership of David M. Keeler, who paid off the paper's creditors. Keeler took on partner John S. Fillmore (nephew of U.S. president Millard Fillmore) and succeeded in ousting Starr, who kept publishing his own version of the Sentinel. Keeler and Fillmore trumped his efforts by turning their Sentinel into a daily on December 9, 1844, while still publishing a weekly edition. The paper finally began to prosper and establish itself as a major political force in the nascent state of Wisconsin. Having accomplished his goal of establishing the first daily paper in the territory, Keeler retired two months later, but not before opening a public reading room of the nation's newspapers, the origin of Milwaukee's public library system. Fillmore employed a succession of editors, including Jason Downer, later a Wisconsin Supreme Court justice, and Increase A. Lapham, a Midwestern naturalist who later helped establish the National Weather Service.

After running through six editors in eight years, Fillmore sought a more stable editorial foundation and went east to confer with Thurlow Weed, editor of the Albany Evening Journal and powerful Whig political boss of New York. Weed recommended his associate editor and protégé, Rufus King. King was a native of New York City, a graduate of West Point, a brevet lieutenant, the son of the president of Columbia College and the grandson of U.S. Constitution signer Rufus King. In June 1845 King came to Milwaukee and became the Sentinel's editor three months later.

The paper provided thorough coverage of Wisconsin's constitutional convention, held in Madison in 1846. When the adopted constitution fell short of Whig expectations, the Sentinel was instrumental in encouraging its rejection by territorial voters on April 6, 1847. The Sentinel launched a German-language paper, Der Volksfreund, to bring the city's large population of German immigrants to the Whig cause. Gen. King himself was a delegate to Wisconsin's second constitutional convention. He was also appointed head of the Milwaukee militia and sat on the University of Wisconsin's board of regents, as well as being the first superintendent of Milwaukee public schools. In the wake of the Panic of 1857 King sold the paper to T.D. Jermain and H.H. Brightman, but remained editor, covering the state legislative sessions of 1859–1861 himself.

In 1848, the Sentinel praised the Treaty of Guadalupe Hidalgo, a treaty that ended the Mexican–American War, commenting: "Peace upon almost any terms will be joyfully welcomed by the American People. They have long since tired of the war."

The Sentinel prospered during the Civil War, sometimes printing five editions of the paper in a day. Though much of the war news was copied from Chicago papers, the Sentinel did dispatch a war correspondent for over half a year. The war also resulted in a shortage of skilled printers, so in 1863 the Sentinel began hiring and training "female compositors" to typeset the paper, albeit in another building away from the men. This resulted in members of the Milwaukee Typographical Union leaving their jobs, but the war had already depleted their ranks to such a degree that the union later temporarily disbanded. Frustrated by the lack of skilled help, editor C. Latham Sholes tried building a typesetting machine, but failed. After becoming comptroller for the city a few years later, he invented the modern typewriter. After the war ended circulation fell off and the number of editions was kept to a minimum.

A supporter of the Liberal Republicans, who opposed President Ulysses S. Grant, Thomson was ousted from the paper after Carpenter's former law partner Newton S. Murphey bought the Sentinel in 1874 with other pro-Grant Republicans, including Carpenter, who had failed to be re-elected. After Murphey loaned Carpenter $20,000 to also become a stakeholder in the paper, Carpenter hired A. C. Botkin as editor, formerly of the Chicago Times, to replace Thomson. The Sentinel was soon perceived as Carpenter's "personal mouthpiece" and an organ of the state Republican central committee. After committee chairman Elisha W. Keyes blocked Carpenter from becoming a delegate to the national Republican convention in 1876, the paper began running fierce editorials denouncing Keyes. The Sentinel later endorsed Carpenter over Keyes as senator in the 1878 election.

Disappointed in the paper's weak defense of unregulated corporations, a new group of stalwart Republicans purchased the old Democratic Milwaukee News in 1880 and resurrected it as the Republican and News. Horace Rublee, a former editor of the Wisconsin State Journal and who had been the chairman of the state Republican party, was hired as editor-in-chief. Failing to put the Sentinel out of business, the Republicans bought the paper outright and issued it as the Republican-Sentinel. The next year the word Republican was dropped, but the paper remained a major force in the state's Republican party. This troubled managing editor Lucius W. Nieman, who had covered the state capitol for the Sentinel and had seen the control the powerful monied interests had over state government. When a Democrat was elected to Congress from a die-hard Republican county, the Sentinel's editor refused to print the fact. This led Nieman to resign and join the fledgling Milwaukee Journal. The Journal first received acclaim when Nieman's coverage of a deadly hotel fire revealed it to be a firetrap, but the Sentinel defended the hotel's management, which included a Sentinel stockholder.

Historian Frederick Jackson Turner was the Sentinel's Madison correspondent for a year, beginning in April 1884, while he finished his senior year at the University of Wisconsin. He covered various aspects of life in Madison, from campus news to the state legislature. He delivered the scoop that university regent and state political boss Elisha W. Keyes wished to remove university president John Bascom for political reasons and it was Turner's reports that resulted in a backlash of support for the president. Bascom had earlier offered Turner a position teaching elocution at the university that he turned down in favor of working for the Sentinel for nine more months. He left the paper after Republicans appointed him as the transcribing clerk to Wisconsin's state senate before later going on to teach history.

In 1892–1893 the Sentinel moved temporarily from its home on Mason Street so that the old building could be torn down and a new, state-of-the-art structure could be erected in its place.

With the dawning of the Progressive Era during the 1890s the Sentinel began to moderate its views, often echoing calls for political reform. After the Panic of 1893 a private utility monopoly run by stalwart Republican party bosses Charles F. Pfister and Henry C. Payne, The Milwaukee Electric Railway and Light Company (TMER&L), revoked commuter passes and raised utility rates during the depression. The Sentinel joined in the chorus of indignation that resounded from Milwaukee and beyond, particularly during 1899 when Pfister and Payne succeeded, by means of bribery, to push through a 35-year contract with the city. On December 29 Pfister and Payne sued the Sentinel for libel, to which the paper replied that it had fallen prey to "probably the most formidable and influential combination of selfish interests ever found in the city of Milwaukee."

Rather than going to trial and having his business practices revealed, Pfister bought the Sentinel outright on February 18, 1901, paying an immense sum to buy up a majority of its stock. After the death of his publisher, Lansing Warren, that summer Pfister assumed publishing duties, immersing himself in the paper's operations and directing political coverage. Owning the Sentinel expanded his conservative influence from the convention backrooms to the pages of the largest daily paper in Wisconsin. The Sentinel immediately opposed the newly elected Governor La Follette. During La Follete's successful re-election campaign in 1902, Pfister's political power was diminished after it had been revealed that he had secretly purchased the editorial pages of some 300 of the state's newspapers.

A majority stake was purchased by the Hearst Corporation in 1924. Operations of the Sentinel were joined to Hearst's papers, the afternoon Wisconsin News and the morning Milwaukee Telegram; the latter being merged with the Sentinel as the Milwaukee Sentinel & Telegram. The Wisconsin News entered into a lease arrangement with the School of Engineering for radio station WSOE on November 15, 1927. The lease was for a minimum of three years. To reflect the new arrangement, the Wisconsin News changed the call letters of WSOE to WISN on January 23, 1928. The station was sold to the Wisconsin News in November 1930. Hearst's associate Paul Block acquired Pfister's remaining stake of the Sentinel in 1929. The News closed in 1939, being consolidated with the Sentinel as a single morning paper. In 1955 Hearst purchased television station WTVW and changed the call letters to WISN-TV.

=== The Milwaukee Journal ===
The Milwaukee Journal began as The Daily Journal in 1882. Edna Ferber, later a famed writer and Pulitzer Prize-winning novelist, was a Milwaukee Journal reporter for nearly four years, from approximately 1903 to 1907.

The Journal followed the Sentinel into broadcasting. The Journal purchased radio station WKAF in 1927, changing its call letters to WTMJ. It launched an experimental FM station, W9XAO, in 1940, which was licensed as a commercial station in 1941, originally as W55M, and later becoming WMFM and WTMJ-FM. This station was shut down in 1950. In 1959 a new WTMJ-FM was licensed, which later became WKTI-FM, WLWK-FM, and WKTI. WTMJ-TV, Wisconsin's first television station, went on the air in 1947.

=== Merger ===
In January 1995, faced with rising costs of newsprint and a declining Journal circulation, Journal Communications decided to merge the two publications. The company announced that they expected to cut the equivalent of between 500 and 550 full-time jobs. The final issue of the Journal was published on the evening of March 31, 1995, and the final issue of the Sentinel was published on the morning of April 1, 1995. The first issue of the merged publication was published on April 2, 1995.

=== 21st century ===
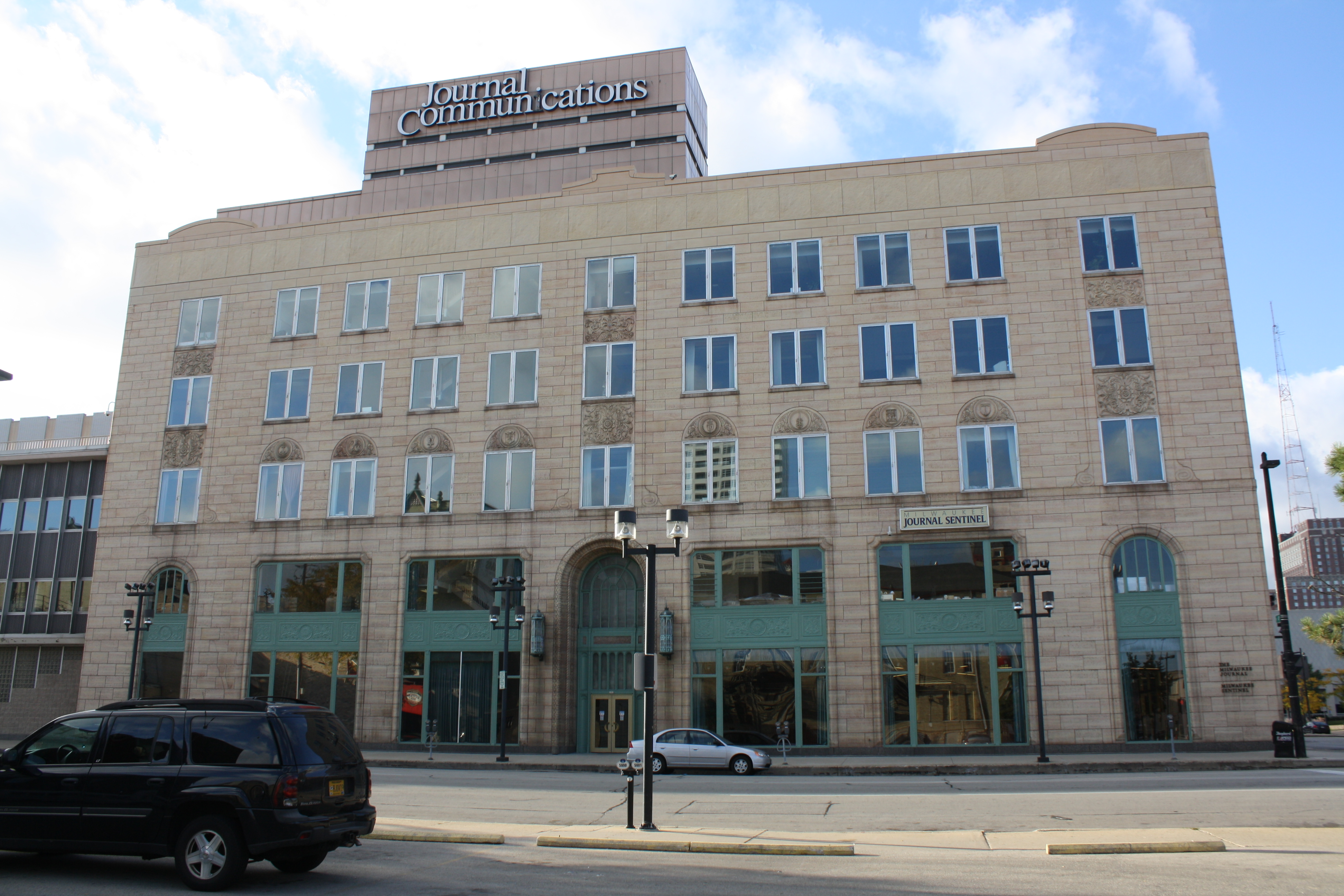
The former Journal Communications building

As of mid-2012, the Journal Sentinel had the 31st-largest circulation among all major U.S. newspapers, with circulation of 207,000 for the daily edition and just under 338,000 for the Sunday edition.

On April 8, 2016, decades of local ownership for both papers ended when Journal Media Group was acquired by the Gannett Company for $280 million. Gannett owns most of the daily newspapers in the central and eastern parts of Wisconsin (eleven in all), including the Green Bay Press-Gazette and Appleton's The Post-Crescent. The Journal Sentinel has been integrated into the company's "USA Today Network Wisconsin". The Journal Sentinel also collaborates with the Press-Gazette for Packers coverage, and adapted to Gannett standards, including newspaper layout, website and apps, in August 2016.

In the spring of 2018, the Journal Sentinel press facility began to print all of Gannett's state papers (it already printed The Sheboygan Press and USA Today) replacing the company's Appleton facility. By 2021, it was reported that about 90% of Journal Sentinel subscriptions were for its print edition despite a years-long push to increase the number of digital subscribers.

In April 2024, the newspaper launched a redesigned Sunday edition.

== Awards ==
The Milwaukee Journal and the Milwaukee Journal Sentinel have received Pulitzer Prizes:

In 1934, cartoonist Ross A. Lewis won for his cartoon on labor-industry violence, "Sure, I'll Work for Both Sides".

In 1966, the series "Pollution: The Spreading Menace" garnered the award for public service.

In 1977, Margo Huston became the first female staff member of The Milwaukee Journal to win a Pulitzer Prize. She won the award in the category of best general reporting for a series of articles on the elderly and the process of aging.

In 2008, local government reporter David Umhoefer was awarded the 2008 Pulitzer Prize for Local Reporting for his investigation of the Milwaukee County pension system.

In 2010, reporter Raquel Rutledge was awarded the 2010 Pulitzer Prize for local reporting for her investigations and stories on abuses in a state-run child care system.

In 2011, Mark Johnson, Kathleen Gallagher, Gary Porter, Lou Saldivar, and Alison Sherwood were awarded the Pulitzer Prize for Explanatory Reporting for their "lucid examination of an epic effort to use genetic technology to save a 4-year-old boy imperiled by a mysterious disease, told with words, graphics, videos and other images."

=== Other awards ===
In 1965 the paper's women's section won the Penney-Missouri Award for General Excellence.

== Archives ==
In 2008, Google published the newspaper's archives as part of an initiative to digitize historical newspapers. Though the initiative ended in 2011, the archives remain accessible. The Milwaukee digitization used microfilm that had been scanned for ProQuest's database. At the Journal Sentinel's request, the Milwaukee Public Library loaned decades of missing microfilm volumes to complete the digitization. When Google's project ended, the newspaper began the process of creating its own archive via its relationship with Newsbank.

Newsbank unsuccessfully attempted to sell Journal Sentinel digital archive access to the Milwaukee Public Library, which could not afford their asking price. The Library already subscribed to Newsbank's obituary and recent Journal Sentinel articles, as well as other proprietary databases with annual subscriptions costing less than $100,000. In May 2014, Newsbank suggested several purchase options, one of which was $1.5 million, which would have consumed nearly all of the library's $1.7 million materials budget. The newspaper changed ownership to Gannett in April and by August had requested that Google remove free public access to the archives, leaving a gap in coverage. Google Newspapers access was restored in December 2017, but digital access continued to be sporadic over the next several years.

== Bibliography ==
- Conrad, Will C., Kathleen Wilson, and Dale Wilson (1964). The Milwaukee Journal: The First Eighty Years. University of Wisconsin Press.
  - Review by Scott Cutlip (Fall 1964). "Portrait Without Blemishes", Columbia Journalism Review, pp. 42–43.
- Wells, Robert W. (1981). The Milwaukee Journal: An Informal Chronicle of its First 100 Years. Milwaukee, WI: Milwaukee Journal.
