= Mark Konkol =

American journalist

Mark Konkol is a Pulitzer Prize-winning journalist and documentary film producer from Chicago. Konkol worked as a writer and producer on the Peabody Award-winning documentary television series, Time: The Kalief Browder, executive produced by Jay-Z.

== Early life and education ==
Konkol was born and raised in Chicago's south suburbs. He graduated in 1991 from Thornwood High School in South Holland, Illinois. He then attended Culver–Stockton College for two years, where he was a starting lineman for the Wildcats football team. He then transferred to Western Illinois University, where he graduated in 1995 with bachelor's degrees in communication and journalism. While at Western Illinois, he was a reporter and news editor at the Western Courier, the university's student newspaper. During the spring before his graduation, Konkol was hired by the Macomb Journal newspaper in Macomb, Illinois where he covered county government and high school sports.

== Career ==
Konkol wrote for Star Newspapers. He later covered Chicago City Hall for the Daily Southtown newspaper (previously the SouthtownStar) and wrote a column for the Chicago Sun-Times' Red Streak edition. He joined the Sun-Times news staff in 2004 and covered transportation, Cook County courts and government, and Chicago neighborhoods. In 2011, he became the paper's Writer at Large.

Among other things, Konkol wrote columns and an occasional blog for the Chicago Sun-Times called "Konkol's Korner."

In September 2012, Konkol resigned from the Sun-Times to join DNAinfo.com as the start-up local news website's Writer at Large. In early 2017, he left DNAinfo after four years to pursue other interests, such as television production. DNAinfo folded in November 2017.

He was published in the online hyperlocal news website Patch, which featured his columns.

Konkol was a producer, writer and narrator of CNN's "Chicagoland" documentary series.

== Chicago Reader controversy ==
In early 2018, Konkol was appointed executive editor of the Chicago Reader, an alternative weekly newspaper. His tenure lasted just over two weeks and ended abruptly following the publication of the February 15, 2018, issue, which featured a cover illustration that was widely criticized as racially insensitive. The cover depicted Illinois gubernatorial candidate J.B. Pritzker sitting on a Black lawn jockey statue while speaking on the phone, referencing a 2008 FBI wiretapped conversation between Pritzker and former Governor Rod Blagojevich that touched on Black political leaders in Chicago.

The image drew swift backlash from public officials, including Cook County Board President Toni Preckwinkle, Chicago City Treasurer Kurt Summers, and Alderman Roderick Sawyer, who issued a joint statement condemning the cover as racist.

Konkol also faced criticism from within the newsroom. Reporter Adeshina Emmanuel, who contributed two stories to the issue, publicly stated that Konkol pressured him to include racially charged language in a headline, calling it "the worst racial experience I've had as a professional journalist working with a white editor and publication."

On February 17, 2018, it was announced that Konkol had been fired. The incident raised broader concerns about newsroom diversity, editorial oversight, and the use of provocative content in journalism.

== 2021 Chicago Bears coaching report controversy ==
In November 2021, Konkol reported for Patch.com that Chicago Bears head coach Matt Nagy would be fired following the team's Thanksgiving Day game against the Detroit Lions. The report generated widespread attention, but Nagy remained in his position after the game. Konkol later acknowledged the report was inaccurate, attributing the error either to being misled by a trusted source or a change in the team's plans after the leak. He stated, "When I offered the Bears a chance to officially say the information wasn't true, I got snarky answers rather than straight ones." He also took personal responsibility for publishing the report, saying, "I should have done better."

In response to the report, Nagy publicly denied the claim, stating, "That is not accurate," and emphasized that his focus remained on preparing the team for their upcoming matchup. According to additional reporting, Bears chairman George McCaskey spoke to the team directly to dispel the rumor, assuring players that Nagy would not be fired after the game.

== Awards ==
Konkol was nominated for an Emmy Award for his work as producer and on-air talent for "We Are Timeless" White Sox Promo for Comcast Sportsnet (2017).

On April 18, 2011, Konkol, crime reporter Frank Main, and photographer John J. Kim won the Pulitzer Prize for Local Reporting for "their immersive documentation of violence in Chicago neighborhoods, probing the lives of victims, criminals and detectives as a widespread code of silence impedes solutions."'
