= Paul Giblin =

American investigative journalist

Paul Giblin is an American investigative journalist based in Phoenix, Arizona.

== Education and Professional career ==
He graduated from University of Arizona in 1988. He worked for the East Valley Tribune in Mesa, Arizona. He writes for the Arizona Guardian. He is a civilian spokesman for the U.S. Army Corps of Engineers Afghanistan.

Giblin and Ryan Gabrielson won a Pulitzer Prize for Local Reporting in 2009, with the East Valley Tribune, citing "their adroit use of limited resources to reveal, in print and online, how a popular sheriff's focus on immigration enforcement endangered investigation of violent crime and other aspects of public safety."

Giblin also won a George Polk Award for Justice Reporting in 2008.

== Works ==
- "Friction After Patrols in Phoenix Immigrant Area", The New York Times, March 23, 2008
