= Amsterdam Weekly =

- Type: Alternative weekly
- Format: Tabloid
- Owner: Amsterdam Weekly BV
- Publisher: Todd Savage
- Editor: Steve Korver
- Arts Editor: Laura Martz
- Founded: 2004; 22 years ago
- Ceased publication: 2012; 14 years ago
- Language: English
- Headquarters: 's Gravenhekje 1-A, 1011 TG Amsterdam, Netherlands
- Circulation: 26,000

Amsterdam Weekly (2004–2012) was a free English-language cultural paper from Amsterdam, published every Wednesday.

== History and profile ==
Amsterdam Weekly offered mainly information about cultural topics and events like live concerts, theater, visual art, movies, and the gay and lesbian scene in and around Amsterdam. The paper used to be available at bookshops, cinemas, clubs, grocery stores, restaurants and bars and could also be downloaded as a PDF from the website.

Amsterdam Weekly was twice exhibited at the Design Museum in London, cited as one of 'the most inspiring design innovations to have been developed in Europe in the past two years', and was awarded six European Newspaper Awards.

Staff members included publisher Todd Savage, editor Steve Korver and arts editor Laura Martz.

The newspaper closed in 2012 after financial difficulties.
