= Sarah Conway =

American investigative journalist

Sarah Conway is an American investigative journalist. She won the Pulitzer Prize for Local Reporting alongside Trina Reynolds-Tyler for their investigative series, Missing in Chicago.

== Career ==
Conway worked as a reporter in Iraq, Niger, Madagascar, and Ghana. She has served as the Annenberg Visiting Chair of Journalism at the University of Notre Dame and a data fellow at the USC Annenberg Center for Health Journalism.

== Awards ==
Conway and Reynolds-Tyler were awarded the 2024 Pulitzer Prize for Local Reporting. The series also received the 2024 Izzy Award for independent media, the Richard H. Driehaus Foundation Award, and the Online Journalism Award for Excellence in Social Justice Reporting. she co-authored The Promise a nonfiction journalism comic about a Syrian asylum seeker's journey to Chicago, which was a finalist for the Chicago Society of Professional Journalists Best Illustration award.
