= Gerald Loeb Award winners for Breaking News =

American journalism award

The Gerald Loeb Award is given annually for multiple categories of business reporting. The "Breaking News" category was first awarded in 2008.

== Gerald Loeb Award for Breaking News (2008–present) ==
- 2008: "The Fall of E. Stanley O’Neal at Merrill Lynch" by Jenny Anderson, and Landon Thomas Jr.,The New York Times

"These two reporters at The New York Times broke and kept breaking the news, providing astonishing perspective and continuous scoops on the ouster of Merrill Lynch CEO E. Stanley O’Neal. Written with authority built on tremendous sourcing, this was a fascinating case study of the downfall of a leader and simultaneously signified an historic moment on Wall Street. The Times delivered reporting, analysis and writing at breakneck speed, often reporting events before they were announced."

- 2008: (Honorable Mention) "A New U.S. Auto Industry" by Katie Merx, Tim Higgins, Tom Walsh, Mark Phelan, Susan Tompor, Sarah A. Webster, Katherine Yung, and Joe Guy Collier, Detroit Free Press

"This special report was an authoritative, comprehensive examination of a key day for Michigan readers- and for an iconic American industry struggling to survive- in the pivotal labor agreement reached in the aftermath of the UAW’s strike against General Motors. Merx and her colleagues at the Detroit Free Press did a superb job of breaking the latest news, being the first in the nation to report the terms of agreement online, while also adding context to relay the broader significance of the agreement to future dealings with U.S. automakers."

- 2009: "The Day That Changed Wall Street" by Carrick Mollenkamp, Susanne Craig, Serena Ng, Aaron Lucchetti, Matthew Karnitschnig, Dan Fitzpatrick, Deborah Solomon, Dennis K. Berman, Liam Pleven, Peter Lattman, and Annelena Lobb, The Wall Street Journal

Articles in Series:
1. "Crisis on Wall Street as Lehman Totters, Merill Is Sold, AIG Seeks to Raise Cash", September 15, 2008
2. "Ultimatum By Paulson Sparked Frantic End", September 15, 2008
3. "Bank of America to Buy Merrill", September 15, 2008
4. "Lehman Totters as U.S. Opts to Avoid Financial Rescue", September 15, 2008
5. "Ultimatum Sparked Frantic End", September 15, 2008
6. "BofA to Acquire Merrill for $44 Billion", September 15, 2008
7. "AIG Scrambles to Raise Cash, Talks to Fed", September 15, 2008
8. "A Chaotic Sunday Opens Wall Street's Week", September 15, 2008
9. "AIG Scrambles to Raise Cash, Talks With Fed", September 15, 2008
10. "Stocks to Be Tested Today", September 15, 2008

- 2010: "GM, Chrysler Nudged Toward Bankruptcy" by Christine Tierney, David Shepardson, and Gordon Trowbridge, Detroit News

Articles in Series:
1. "Bailout to two automakers could reach $39B", February 18, 2009
2. "Obama Forces Wagoner Out", March 30, 2009
3. "Feds: Bankruptcy may be best option", March 31, 2009

- 2011: "Flash Crash" by Tom Lauricella, Peter A. McKay, Scott Patterson, Jenny Strasburg, Robin Sidel, Carolyn Cui, and Mary Pilon, The Wall Street Journal

Articles in Series:
1. "Dow Takes a Herrowing 1,010.14-point Trip", May 7, 2010
2. "Did Shutdowns Make Plunge Worse?", May 7, 2010
3. "From the Streets of New York, the Day's Din", May 7, 2010
4. "Computer Trading Is Eyed", May 8–9, 2010
5. "Two Managers, One Winner", May 12, 2010

- 2012: "GM-UAW Contract Negotiations" by Brent Snavely, Greg Gardner, and Chrissie Thompson, Detroit Free Press

Articles in Series:
1. "GM, UAW reach deal", September 17, 2011
2. "GM and UAW: Deal is a victory for all", September 18, 2011
3. "Back from the brink", September 18, 2011
4. "New deal sounding good", September 18, 2011
5. "Deal has potential to be lucrative for workers, plants, communities", September 18, 2011
6. "Newer GM workers may get lift", September 18, 2011

- 2013: "Best Buy CEO Resigns Under Cloud" by Thomas Lee, David Phelps, Janet Moore, Paul McEnroe, Tony Kennedy, Patrick Kennedy, and Eric Wieffering, Star Tribune

Articles in Series:
1. "Best Buy CEO resigns under cloud", April 11, 2012
2. "UnitedHealth vet Mikan asked to steady best buy", April 11, 2012
3. "What Best Buy needs is an outsider as its next CEO", April 11, 2012
4. "Dunn's conduct with staffer at issue", April 12, 2012
5. "Best Buy deals tied to insiders draw scrutiny", April 15, 2012

- 2014: "Bangladesh" by Jim Yardley, Julfikar Ali Manik, and Steven Greenhouse, The New York Times
- 2015: "Abdication of the 'Bond King'" by Gregory Zuckerman, and Kirsten Grind, The Wall Street Journal
- 2016: "Inside the Dow-DuPont Merger" by David Benoit, Jacob Bunge, Dana Cimilluca, Dana Mattioli, and Dennis K. Berman, The Wall Street Journal
- 2017: "Saudi Aramco: The World’s Most Valuable IPO" by Zanny Minton Beddoes, Henry Tricks, Anton La Guardia, Chris Lockwood, and Edward McBride, The Economist

Articles in Series:
1. "Saudi Arabia is considering an IPO of Aramco, probably the world's most valuable company", January 7, 2016
2. "The Saudi blueprint", January 9, 2016
3. "Saudi Arabia: Young prince in a hurry", January 9, 2016
4. "Saudi Aramco: Sale of the century?", January 9, 2016
5. "Saudi Aramco: The big float". April 30, 2016

- 2018: "Ouster at Uber" by Mike Isaac, Farhad Manjoo, Kevin Roose, and Ashwin Seshagiri, The New York Times
- 2019: "Amazon's HQ2 About-face" by Scott Calvert, Eliot Brown, Peter Grant, Tawnell Hobbs, Katie Honan, Melissa Korn, Douglas MacMillan, Eric Morath, Keiko Morris, Shayndi Raice, Stephanie Stamm, Laura Stevens, Jimmy Vielkind and Lauren Weber, The Wall Street Journal

Articles in Series:

1. "Amazon Plans to Split HQ2 Evenly Between Two Cities", November 5, 2018
2. "Too Many Jobs, Not Enough Talent Spurs Amazon to Split HQ2", November 2018
3. "Google Plans Large New York City Expansion", November 7, 2018
4. "What Amazon Saw in New York And Northern Virginia", November 13, 2018
5. "How Amazon Picked HQ2 and Jilted 236 Cities", November 13, 2018

- 2020: "Crash in Ethiopia" by Hadra Ahmed, Hannah Beech, Selam Gebrekidan, David Gelles, James Glanz, Thomas Kaplan, Natalie Kitroeff, Jack Nicas, Norimitsu Onishi, Dionne Searcey, Kenneth P. Vogel, and Zach Wichter, The New York Times
- 2021: "Collapse of Wirecard." by Dan McCrum, Olaf Storbeck, Stefania Palma, John Reed, Guy Chazan, and Laurence Fletcher, Financial Times
- 2022: "The GameStop Frenzy" by Juliet Chung, Gunjan Banerji, Julia-Ambra Verlaine, Caitlin McCabe, and Akane Otani, The Wall Street Journal
- 2023: "The Collapse of FTX" by Tom Wilson, Angus Berwick, Chris Prentice, Hannah Lang, Koh Gui Qing, Jasper Ward, Luc Cohen, Elizabeth Howcroft, Lawrence Delevingne, Anirban Sen, Greg Roumelotis, Reuters

== See also ==
- Gerald Loeb Award winners for Television Breaking News (2009-2010)
