= Fish Rap Live! =

Student Newspaper

- Type: Triquarterly student newspaper
- Format: Tabloid
- School: University of California, Santa Cruz
- Campus chief: Susan Watrous
- Founded: 1985, 1990
- Headquarters: UC Santa Cruz, USA
- Circulation: 12,000
- Website: fishrap.live

Fish Rap Live!, also known as FRL!, is a triquarterly alternative humor publication at the University of California, Santa Cruz. It was founded in 1985 by a group of Cowell affiliates at the University of California, Santa Cruz The 2007 book "Grassroots Journalism" by Eesha Wiliams (published by Dollars and Sense, Boston) has a section about FRL.

== Recognition ==
The paper received two Gold Circle Awards from the Columbia Scholastic Press Association in 2002 in the General or Humor Column and Ad Design categories and one in 1999 for Illustration Portfolios and Editorial Cartooning. It also continues to receive recognition and is consistently ranked amongst the top college humor publications in the country. In 2003, an autobiographical book written by Andy Lochrie was published detailing the history of Fish Rap Live! titled Fish Lips

== Features ==
=== Ongoing ===
News Briefs - News satire in the style of The Onion.

Editorials - Humorous first-person articles written under a variety of different characters, fictional or not.

Overheard in Santa Cruz - Reader-submitted recollections of humorous, and often frightening, exchanges overheard around the Santa Cruz area.

Why the Fuck Are You Still Talking? - Fake interviews that revolve around a central question.

=== Recurring ===
Classes to Audit - A quarterly parody of upcoming or current classes at UCSC. Examples include: "CMPE 80E: Intro to Networking - Prepare for hundreds of business cards and firm handshakes.", "CHEM 122: Instrumental Analysis - Yeah, I'm pretty sure this one's a tuba.", "ANTH 80H: Acoustic Culture - Taught by that guy in Porter Quad who plays "Skinny Love" on his Fender acoustic." and "PHIL 139: Freud - Your mom."

Dive Team - One or more editors travels to a local Dive Bar and tells of their experience. In recent years, this has been expanded to include a myriad of other stories, including one of a Yu-Gi-Oh! tournament and one of an editor's experience of trying to keep bees.

The Fish Rappies - Annual parody of prestigious national awards. Examples include "Best Bond: Covalent. Worst Bond: Roger Moore", and "Best Bono: Pro Bono, Worst Bono: Bono."

The Freshman Circus - A parody of The Family Circus. The comic strip lampoons the naiveté of UCSC underclassmen fumbling their way through their first year of college.

From: Blank To: Blank, With Love - Short letters from writers taking the perspective of people, places, animals, and objects addressing other people, places, objects and such.

Scavenger Hunt - An annual scavenger hunt that puts the participants in harm's way, in embarrassing situations, or prompts practical jokes. Examples include: "Cut off 5 Livestrong bracelets", "Ghost Ride 'da Whip", "Stage a fake public breakup", and "Date a FRL! staff member, extra points per base reached." The prize is usually nominal amounts of both cash and fame.

Bad Romance - A personal diary entry or letter of the various trials and tribulations of desire, lust, and love.

Point, Counterpoint - Duel editorials making opposing arguments. Topics include: visiting Sacramento, 7-Eleven, and the ground.

== See also ==
- UC Santa Cruz
- City on a Hill Press
- KZSC Radio
