= City on a Hill Press =

Student newspaper of the University of California, Santa Cruz

- Type: Weekly student newspaper
- Format: Tabloid
- Owner: City on a Hill Press
- Founded: 1966
- Headquarters: Press Center; 1156 High Street; Santa Cruz, CA 95064
- Website: cityonahillpress.com

City on a Hill Press, originally launched in 1966 as The Fulcrum, is the weekly student newspaper of the University of California, Santa Cruz (UCSC). Designed as a magazine, the weekly tabloid-sized paper releases new issues every Thursday of the fall, winter and spring academic quarters, as well as a back-to-school issue entitled "Primer" at the end of the summer session, for a total of 30 issues per school year.

The paper reports not only on UCSC campus news, but also on news in the city of Santa Cruz.

== Awards ==
The paper was named the 1986 College Gold Crown Newspaper by the Columbia Scholastic Press Association, as well as Best All-Around Student Newspaper in 1983 from the Society of Professional Journalists.

Sam Laird (fall 2006 City reporter, winter 2007 City editor) won The Chronicle of Higher Education's fifth annual David W. Miller Award for Student Journalists for writing and reporting that he did while at City on a Hill Press, as well as a Columbia Scholastic Press Association Certificate of Merit for News Feature Writing for his 2007 story "The Colorblind Society: Are We There Yet?"

Grace Cha, editor in chief received a national first place award in 1994 for her work in investigative reporting on garment workers in the San Francisco Bay Area. Her story exposed the mistreatment of Asian immigrant women garment workers by corporate dressmakers who contract work from garment factories, and pay less than minimum wage, while selling their dresses for hundreds of dollars. Asian Immigrant Women’s Advocates (AIWA) held public protests and demanded more humane treatment and compensation for lost wages. Grace received a First Place award for In-Depth Feature from the Columbia Scholastic Press Association, Gold Circle Awards.

== Alumni ==
Notable alumni include Pulitzer Prize–winning journalists Dana Priest and Martha Mendoza.

== See also ==
- Fish Rap Live!
