= Tim Higgins =

Tim Higgins may refer to:

- Tim Higgins (ice hockey), Canadian hockey player
- Tim Higgins (journalist), American journalist and author
