= Henry Kyle Frese =

American counterterrorist analyst (born 1988)

Henry Kyle (Keenan) Frese
- Born: October 27, 1988 (age 37)
- Occupation: Former counter-terrorism analyst at the Defense Intelligence Agency
- Status: Released from prison on October 14, 2022
- Conviction: Willful transmission of national defense information
- Criminal charges: Willful transmission of national defense information
- Penalty: 30 months in prison

Henry Kyle (Keenan) Frese (born October 27, 1988) is a former employee at the Defense Intelligence Agency, between February 2018 and October 2019, during which time he was assigned to a "Sensitive Compartment Information Facility" in Virginia.

== Federal investigation ==
=== Arrest ===
On October 9, 2019, Frese was arrested and charged with two violations of the Espionage Act under 18 USC 793(d) by a grand jury in the Eastern District of Virginia for willful transmission of National Defense Information. He held "Top Secret" (TS) clearance. He was arrested at work at the Defense Intelligence Agency in Reston, Virginia, on October 9, 2019.

The Justice Department alleged that Frese disclosed the top secret information to newspaper reporters, one of which Justice alleged was a reporter with whom Frese may have been involved in a "romantic relationship," and whom the government referred to as "Journalist 1;" Erik Wemple of The Washington Post identified the journalist as Amanda Macias, as did The Wall Street Journal, which also identified a second involved journalist as Courtney Kube, a senior reporter for NBC. Frese and Macias had shared a home.

=== Guilty plea ===
On February 20, 2020, Frese pleaded guilty to the willful transmission of Top Secret national defense information.

The Washington Post, News of Australia, and The Spectator all compared Frese's case to that of Senate Intelligence Committee staffer James Wolfe, who allegedly passed on secrets to Ali Watkins during a romantic relationship.

=== Sentencing ===
On June 18, 2020, Frese was sentenced to 30 months in prison for "leaking information to two journalists, including one he was dating"; prosecutors had asked for nine years, but his defense argued, among others, that his girlfriend, “a reporter whose 'career was stalling',” had pressured and influenced him at a susceptible time. While he at first rebuffed her cajoling, his “judgment was clouded by 'a misguided effort to salvage a relationship that was not worth saving'.”

Frese was released from prison on October 14, 2022.

== Personal life ==
Frese had Canadian citizenship, which he gave up to work in U.S. intelligence. He is a graduate of Queen's University at Kingston.

== See also ==
- Honeypot
