= James A. Wolfe =

James Wolfe
- Born: James A. Wolfe; December 20, 1960 (age 65)
- Occupation: Former Security Director of the Senate Select Committee on Intelligence
- Spouses: Leslie Adair (m. 1984) Jane Rhodes (m. 2013)
- Status: Released in 2019; BOP Register #64054-037
- Conviction: Making false statements (18 USC § 1001)
- Penalty: Two months in prison, $7,500 fine

James A. Wolfe (born December 20, 1960) is a former Security Director of the U.S. Senate Select Intelligence Committee (SSCI), having served in that position for 29 years. In 2018, he was sentenced to two months in federal prison after pleading guilty to lying to the FBI in relation to an investigation into leaks.

== Career ==
Wolfe was the SSCI Security Director for three decades from 1987 to 2017. In this role, he was in charge of the receipt and management of classified information submitted by the executive power; (Note: Wolfe, who as director of security for the Senate Intelligence Committee had been in charge of receiving and managing classified information provided to the oversight panel by the executive branch for 28 years) he was considered a congressional staffer. Prior to that, he served as an Intelligence Analyst for the U.S. Army from 1983 to 1987.

== Leaks and prison sentence ==
Wolfe was sentenced to two months in prison and a $7,500 fine for lying to the FBI during the latter's investigation of his intelligence leaks to Ali Watkins, a New York Times national security journalist, with whom he was involved in a romantic relationship from December 2013 to December 2017. Following imprisonment, Wolfe had to serve four months of supervised release, doing 20 hours of monthly community service.

The Washington Post, News of Australia, and The Spectator all compared Wolfe's case to that of DIA staffer Henry K. Frese, who allegedly passed on secrets to Amanda Macias during a romantic relationship. The New York Times characterized Wolfe's case as procedurally different from that of Natalie Edwards, even though both cases involved leaking to reporters.

== Personal life ==
In 2004, Wolfe was accused of assault by his first wife, Leslie Adair Wolfe, whom he had married in 1984. Wolfe's lawyers denied the charges. Wolfe married Jane Rhodes Wolfe, his second wife, in 2013. In 2018, Wolfe said in court he had an extramarital relationship with a reporter.
