= Sandworm (book) =

2019 nonfiction book by Andy Greenberg

Sandworm: A New Era of Cyberwar and the Hunt for the Kremlin's Most Dangerous Hackers
- Author: Andy Greenberg
- Language: English
- Subject: Sandworm (hacker group)
- Genre: Non-fiction
- Publisher: Doubleday
- Publication date: November 5, 2019
- Publication place: United States
- Media type: Print, e-book, audiobook
- Pages: 368
- ISBN: 978-0-385-54440-5

Sandworm: A New Era of Cyberwar and the Hunt for the Kremlin's Most Dangerous Hackers is a 2019 non-fiction book by Andy Greenberg, a senior writer at Wired. It is about Sandworm, a hacking unit of Russia's GRU military intelligence agency, and focuses on the group's attacks on Ukraine.

== Background ==
Greenberg took leave from Wired to write the book, and the magazine published an excerpt about the NotPetya attack in August 2018. Doubleday released the book on November 5, 2019.

== Content ==
The book begins in 2014, when an analyst at the intelligence firm iSight Partners found Russian malware that exploited a flaw in Microsoft Office. References to Frank Herbert's Dune in the code gave the group its name. Greenberg then follows its attacks on Ukraine, among them the 2015 Ukraine power grid hack, which he calls the first known blackout caused by hackers, and the 2017 NotPetya malware, which spread from Ukraine to companies around the world. He argues that the Obama and Trump administrations treated the attacks on Ukraine as a local matter and that their inaction made this kind of attack acceptable.

== Reception ==
Dina Temple-Raston of The Washington Post called the book "immensely readable", and Cory Doctorow described it in the Los Angeles Times as "an essential guide". Sue Halpern wrote in The New York Review of Books that it was "both perversely entertaining and terrifying". Kirkus Reviews found the narrative "occasionally scattershot". Chris Hewitt of the Star Tribune criticized Greenberg's jargon and his thin portraits of the people involved.

The book received a citation for excellence in the Overseas Press Club of America's Cornelius Ryan Award. The Wired excerpt won the 2019 Gerald Loeb Award for International Reporting.
