= FIFA Uncovered =

American TV documentary series (2022)

- Theatrical release poster
- Written by: Miles Coleman
- Directed by: Daniel Gordon
- Starring: David Conn; Amanda Davies; Jérôme Valcke
- Country of origin: United States
- Original language: English

Production
- Producers: Ken Bensinger; Ali Brown; Kerstin Emhoff; Andrew Ruhemann
- Running time: 221 minutes
- Production company: Ventureland

Original release
- Network: Netflix
- Release: November 9, 2022

FIFA Uncovered is a documentary about corruption investigations of FIFA. It was directed by Daniel Gordon and released on Netflix in 2022.

This documentary chronicles the tumultuous history of FIFA. Over the years, power struggles and corruption have run rampant, intertwining with global politics. It also examines the politics of hosting a home World Cup.

== Episodes ==
- Episode 1: FIFA officials are arrested in 2015, triggering a major corruption investigation into World Cup hosts selections.
- Episode 2: Sepp Blatter's leadership and the 2010 World Cup bid face corruption allegations.
- Episode 3: The controversial selection of Russia and Qatar as World Cup hosts raises bribery concerns.
- Episode 4: Chuck Blazer cooperates with investigators as FIFA struggles to rebuild its credibility.
