= Howard M. Brier =

American journalist

Howard Maxwell Brier (20 March 1903 – October 1969) was an American fiction writer. He wrote primarily adventure and mystery books for teens.

Brier was born in River Falls, Wisconsin. When he was six, the family moved to Everett, Washington, in order to be in a healthier climate for his sick father.

Brier was educated at the University of Washington (1925) and did graduate work at the University of California. He worked as a reporter and later in the advertising department of several newspapers in Seattle. Following that, he became a high school English teacher and later vice-principal of Garfield High School and then principal of Edmond Meany jr. high school in Seattle. Brier later joined the faculty of the University of Washington as a professor of journalism. He was awarded a Gold Key by the Columbia Scholastic Press Association in 1954, for service to student journalism at the university.

Brier's set many of his plots in the Pacific Northwest, where he lived. He wrote in a direct style, depending more on action than on description to make his characters come alive. Because he always held a full-time non-writing job, Brier often serialized his stories in magazines, such as Boys' Life, and then later collected the installments and published them in book form.

As a journalism professor and consultant, Brier had definite views on what makes good writing:

"Very few of us will ever do anything of literary merit. Good sound craftsmanship, is what we need. How do we become sound craftsmen? (i) write to sell; (ii) write for interest— keep your reader always in mind; (iii) write briefly, clearly and concisely. The beginning writer's most popular fault is redundancy. When writing for the general public, keep it simple."

Brier married Grace Kjelstad in 1930. The couple had two children, Nancy and Warren, both deceased. Howard continued to live in Seattle after Grace died in 1965, and died there aged 66 in October 1969.

== Bibliography ==
Books—

- Waterfront Beat. Random House. 1937. OCLC 15614517.
- Skycruiser. Random House. 1939. OCLC 2298454.
- Smoke eater. Random House. 1941. OCLC 1610608.
- Sky Freighter, a story of bush pilots who fly freight to the radium mines of arctic Canada. Random House. 1942. OCLC 2193080.
- Swing Shift. Random House. 1943. OCLC 2193115.
- Skyblazer. Random House. 1946. OCLC 1593212.
- Phantom Backfield. Random House. 1948. OCLC 1597344.
- Backboard Magic. Random House. 1949. OCLC 1597320.
- Shortstop Shadow. Random House. 1950. OCLC 1939490.
- Cinder Cyclone. Random House. 1952. OCLC 1610773.
- Fighting Heart. Doubleday. 1954. OCLC 1894641.
- Sawdust Empire: The Pacific Northwest. Knopf. 1958. OCLC 312642.
- The Southpaw.

Magazine articles—

- Backboard Magic, (sl) Boys’ Life Dec 1948, Jan, Feb, Mar 1949
- A Bone to Pick, (ss) Boys’ Life Oct 1920
- Brass Hat, (ss) Boys’ Life Dec 1943
- Cinder Cyclone, (sl) Boys’ Life May, Jun, Jul, Aug 1952
- The Danger Going, (ss) Boys’ Life Oct 1954
- The Devil Wagon, (ss) The American Boy Mar 1936
- Devils Danced, (ss) The Open Road for Boys Sep 1941
- Fighting Heart, (sl) Boys’ Life Nov, Dec 1950, Jan, Feb 1951
- Fire Blood, (ss) Boys’ Life Aug 1945
- Fools Walk In, (ss) Boys’ Life Nov 1936
- Hoodoo High, (sl) Boys’ Life Nov, Dec 1967
- Ladderman, (ss) Boys’ Life May 1940; (reprinted) Boys’ Life May 1965
- New Tricks, (ss) Boys’ Life Dec 1937
- The Ox Team, (sl) Boys’ Life Oct, Nov 1949
- The Phantom Backfield, (sl) Boys’ Life Sep, Oct, Nov, Dec 1947
- Shortstop Shadow, (sl) Boys’ Life Apr, May, Jun, Jul 1950
- Sky Hook, (ss) Boys’ Life Jan 1947
- Thoroughbred, (ss) Boys’ Life Apr 1943
- Touchdown Trouble, (ss) Boys’ Life Sep 1952
- Unfinished Business, (ss) Boys’ Life Oct 1948
- Yogi's Dark Horse, (ss) Boys’ Life Sep 1951
- Yogi's Magic Ring, (ss) Boys’ Life Nov 1951
- Yogi's PR Client, (ss) Boys’ Life Oct 1956
- Yogi's Smash Story, (ss) Boys’ Life Mar 1955
