= Kelly Award =

The Kelly Award could refer to:

- Michael Kelly Award, a journalism award established by the Atlantic Media Company
- Ned Kelly Awards, an Australian award for crime writing
