= Esther Htusan =

Burmese journalist

- Born: 1987 (age 38–39); Hpakant, Kachin State, Myanmar
- Education: University of Myitkyina
- Occupation: Journalist
- Notable work: "Seafood from Slaves"

Esther Htusan (pronounced TOO-sahn), is a journalist from Myanmar. She is a former Foreign Correspondent for the Associated Press based in Yangon, Myanmar. In 2016, she was the first person from Myanmar to win the Pulitzer Prize.

In 2017, Htusan was forced to flee from her country after reporting on Aung San Suu Kyi's policies toward Rohingya refugees. Htusan is now a freelance journalist, living in the United States.

== Background and education ==
Esther Htusan was born in 1987 in Phakant, Kachin State, Myanmar to ethnic Kachin parents Hkangda Dut La, Bawmli Hkawn Shawng. She finished her primary and secondary education in Myitkyina, Kachin State.

She studied Mathematics at the University of Myitkyina where she earned her bachelor's degree in Science in 2008. After graduating from the university she moved to the country's biggest city, Yangon in 2009 to study English and political science.

== Career ==
Htusan began her journalism career in 2012, working as a freelance fixer and producer for different international news agencies. she was an editor for Kaung Thant Press, from 2012 to August 2013, before joining the Associated Press in September, 2013.

In 2019, looking back at her decision to become a journalist, Htusan wrote about her choice to become a journalist and her parents fear for her safety.

"My parents had watched Maung Thura, a well-known blogger and comedian, being sentenced to 35 years’ imprisonment for criticizing the military in 2008. A year later, in 2009, Hla Hla Win, a journalist with the Democratic Voice of Burma was sentenced to 27 years in prison for investigating the military’s violent crackdown on Buddhist monks during the 2007 Saffron Revolution. They were worried that if I became a journalist, I would end up in prison too."

In 2013, after investigating confiscation of more than 500 acres of farmland by the Navy, a military intelligence officer visited her apartment to interrogate her. When she learned about the visit, she fled to Shan State in the east of Burma for two weeks. Eventually, her fear of imprisonment and prosecution was realized, and Htusan was forced to flee from her home because of her 2017 reporting on Aung San Suu Kyi's policies toward Rohingya refugees and the ongoing "clearance operations" surrounding the Rohingya conflict.

=== Reporting on slavery in Thailand's fishing fleets ===
In 2014, Htusan and Margie Mason embarked on a 30-hour journey to investigate enslaved Burmese fishermen in the remote island village of Benjina in eastern Indonesia. Htusan, and other members of the Associated Press team, spent over a year of investigations leading up to publication of what they learned.

In 2015, the Associated Press began publishing a series of stories that Htusan, Margie Mason, Robin McDowell, and Martha Mendoza, had been working on. The series was the product of over a year of investigative reporting, and led to the rescue of over 2000 slaves in the fishing trade. The stories covered enslaved fishermen and the ordeal they lived through; some were locked in a cages, some of the dead were buried without their family's knowledge, and the inhumane conditions they suffered through.

The series of stories began running in March, 2015, as listed below.

- "US Supply Chain Tainted by Slave-Caught Fish," AP Video, March 24, 2015.
- "AP Investigation: Are slaves catching the fish you buy?" Robin McDowell, Associated Press, March 25, 2015.
- "AP Investigation prompts emergency rescue of 300 plus slaves," Robin McDowell and Margie Mason, Associated Press, April 3, 2015.
- "US lets in Thai fish caught by slaves despite law," Martha Mendoza, Associated Press, April 22, 2015.
- " Seafood from Slaves: 22 years a slave," Margie Mason, Associated Press, June 29, 2015.
- "AP Exclusive: AP tracks slave boats to Papua New Guinea," Robin McDowell, Martha Mendoza and Margie Mason, Associated Press, July 27, 2015.
- "AP Investigation prompts new round of slave rescues," Margie Mason and Martha Mendoza, July 30, 2015.
- "More than 2,000 enslaved fishermen rescued in 6 months," Ester Htusan and Margie Mason, Associated Press, September 17, 2015.
- "Global supermarkets selling shrimp peeled by slaves," Margie Mason, Robin McDowell, Martha Mendoza and Esther Htusan, Associated Press, December 14, 2015.

The reporting led to coverage in numerous US newspapers as well as international coverage and the U.S. State Department began their own investigation and new legislation was passed to help close loopholes that allowed sales of products produced with slave labor.

=== Awards ===
Htusan and the staff of the Associated Press won multiple awards for the coverage of slave-labor in the fishing industry and are listed below.

- 2015 The Hal Boyle Award for best newspaper reporting from abroad
- 2015 the AP's Oliver S. Gramling Journalism Award recognizing AP staffers for professional excellence
- 2015 University of Oregon's Ancil Award for Ethics in Journalism
- 2015 Arizona State University’s Barlett & Steele (Gold) Award for Investigative Business Journalism
- 2015 George Polk Award for Foreign Reporting
- 2016 Pulitzer Prize for Public Service
- 2016 Goldsmith Prize for Investigative Reporting
- 2016 Anthony Lewis Prize for Exceptional Rule of Law Journalism
- 2016 Seldon Ring Award, recognizing investigative reporting that has had an impact and caused change
- 2016 Michael Kelly Award for the fearless pursuit and expression of truth
