= Ali Watkins =

American journalist (born 1992)

- Born: October 27, 1991 (age 35); Pennsylvania, United States
- Education: Temple University
- Occupation: Journalist

Ali Watkins (born 27 October 1991) is an American journalist who writes for The New York Times. Along with two colleagues, she was a finalist for the 2015 Pulitzer Prize for a body of work consisting of 10 articles spanning from March 3, 2014, to July 14, 2014. Watkins has worked for a number of publications, including BuzzFeed, Politico, McClatchy, The Huffington Post, and the Philadelphia Daily News.

Since 2023, Watkins has worked as a reporter for the breaking and trending news operation of the New York Times in Europe, based in London. While a student at Temple University, she broke a national story about the Central Intelligence Agency monitoring United States Senate computers.

== Early life and education ==
Watkins was born and raised in Berks County, Pennsylvania, and attended Fleetwood High School in Fleetwood, Pennsylvania. She is a graduate of Temple University, where she was a news editor for The Temple News.

== Career ==
In 2014, while she was still a senior in college, Watkins broke a national story about the Central Intelligence Agency monitoring United States Senate computers while the Senate Intelligence Committee was preparing a report on the CIA's detention and interrogation program. For their work on the story, Watkins and two other journalists were named as finalists for the 2015 Pulitzer Prize in National Reporting. Watkins' scoop was at the core of the 2019 movie The Report, but her role was "elided."

Watkins' career progression has been characterized as "meteoric" by The Times of London and "stunning" by The Washington Post, and she has been called a "hotshot" by Fox News. In April 2017, in what The New York Times called "a scoop that other news organizations scrambled to match" and The Washington Post said was a "big story," Watkins broke a story about the 2013 meetings between CIA asset Carter Page and a Russian spy.

For several years, Watkins' beat was the Senate Intelligence Committee. At The New York Times, where she was hired in December 2017, Watkins covered national security and law-enforcement agencies from its Washington, D.C. bureau until July 2018.

In July 2018, the Times reassigned Watkins to the New York office, where she covers crime and law enforcement in New York City at the Times Metro desk. The Times explained the reasons for her reassignment: "We are troubled by Ali's conduct, particularly while she was employed by other news organizations [...] For a reporter to have an intimate relationship with someone he or she covers is unacceptable." Watkins relocated to New York.

== Wolfe case ==
From December 2013 to December 2017, Watkins was in a romantic relationship with the former head of security for the Senate Intelligence Committee, James A. Wolfe. The FBI opened an investigation into Wolfe after an April 2017 article by Watkins described contacts between Russian spies and Donald Trump policy adviser Carter Page, who had not been publicly identified in relation to those contacts and who was working for the CIA at the time of the meetings. On October 15, 2018, Wolfe pleaded guilty to one count of lying to the FBI about his relationship with Watkins. Prosecutors alleged that Wolfe leaked to Watkins and three other reporters. Watkins denied that Wolfe ever provided her classified information. Watkins disclosed the relationship to her employers BuzzFeed News, The New York Times, and Politico; however, McClatchy editors said they were ignorant of the relationship while Watkins was an intern and employee from mid-2013 through 2014. Following the Wolfe relationship, Watkins dated another Senate Intelligence Committee staff member, which Politico, her employer at the time, has said she failed to disclose.

Former New York Times editor Jill Abramson said “I hate the whole situation more than I can say,” because she had spent her whole career trying to combat the notion that successful female journalists sleep with their sources. The Sydney Morning Herald reported that the case "bears a strong resemblance to the television drama House of Cards," of which it said Watkins was a fan. In 2019, Erik Wemple of The Washington Post compared Watkins to Amanda Macias, as did Stephen L. Miller of The Spectator.

== Operation Whistle Pig ==
In 2017, Jeffrey Rambo, a U.S. Customs and Border Protection agent working for the National Targeting Center, investigated Watkins, other journalists including Martha Mendoza, and NGOs while on an assignment to combat forced labor in the Congo. The operation was called "Whistle Pig" and in addition to its own database trawling it got the CBP's Counter Network Division to provide information about Watkins' mother and brother and links to their public profiles, as well as details of Watkins' domestic and international travel. Rambo met Watkins under the fictitious name Jack Bentley, but Watkins obtained his real name from a credit card receipt. Watkins perceived Rambo's approach as a threat.

In 2021, Watkins said: "I'm deeply troubled at the lengths CBP and DHS personnel apparently went to try and identify journalistic sources and dig into my personal life." A few days later, CBP launched an investigation.
