= Michael Kelly Award =

American journalism award

The Michael Kelly Award is a journalism award sponsored by the Atlantic Media Company. It is given for "the fearless pursuit and expression of truth"; the prize is $25,000 for the winner and $3,000 for the runners-up. It is named for Michael Kelly, an American journalist killed covering the Iraq War.

In 2003 the University of New Hampshire, Department of English, established the Michael Kelly Memorial Scholarship Fund, which awards a sophomore or junior student "who is passionate about journalism".

Year	Winner	Finalists
2004	Anthony Shadid	Dan Christensen; Tom Junod; John Lantigua; George Packer
2005	Nicholas D. Kristof	David Grann; Kim Murphy; Maximillian Potter; Elizabeth Rubin
2006	Sharon LaFraniere	Kurt Eichenwald; James Risen; Eric Lichtblau; Chris Rose; Cam Simpson
2007	C. J. Chivers	Rukmini Maria Callimachi; Jesse Hamilton; William Langewiesche; Charles Forelle, James Bandler, and Mark Maremont; Steve Stecklow
2008	Loretta Tofani	Kelly Kennedy; Joshua Kors; Tom Vanden Brook; Peter Eisler; Blake Morrison
2009	Ken Armstrong and Nick Perry	Barry Bearak; Celia W. Dugger; Richard Behar; Peter Godwin
2010	David S. Rohde	Ken Bensinger and Ralph Vartabedian; Sheri Fink; Jeffrey Gettleman
2011	Mandy Locke and Joseph Neff	Emily Bazelon; John Bowe; Jonathan M. Katz
2012	Sarah Stillman	Rukmini Maria Callimachi; Kathy Dobie; A.M. Sheehan and Matt Hongoltz-Hetling
2013	Brian Mockenhaupt	Alberto Arce; David Barboza; Michael Phillips
2014	Rukmini Maria Callimachi	Matthieu Aikins; David Phillips; Megan Twohey
2015	Rania Abouzeid	Matthieu Aikins; Alex Campbell; Dexter Filkins
2016	Alissa J. Rubin	Martha Mendoza, Margie Mason, Robin McDowell, Esther Htusan; Ian Urbina; James Verini
2017	Shane Bauer	Hannah Dreier; David Fahrenthold; Selam Gebrekidan, Stephen Grey, Amina Ismail
2018	Dionne Searcey	Kristen Gelineau, Todd Pitman, Esther Htusan; Carol Marbin Miller, Audra D.S. Burch; John Woodrow Cox
2019	Maggie Michael, Nariman Ayman El-Mofty, Maad al-Zikry	Hannah Dreier; Christine Kenneally, Connor Sheets
2020	Azam Ahmed	Tom Warren, Katie J.M. Baker, Kyle Hopkins; Craig Whitlock
2021	Nadja Drost	Margie Mason, Robin McDowell, Tony Plohetski; Megha Rajagopalan; Alison Killing; Christo Buschek
2022	Ian Urbina	Jessica Contrera, Leah Sottile, Andrew Quilty
2023	Lynzy Billing	William Wan, Mstyslav Chernov, Evgeniy Maloltka, Vasilisa Stepanenko, Lori Hinnant, Terence McCoy
