= Michael Wines =

American journalist (born 1951)

- Born: Stephen Michael Wines; June 3, 1951 (age 74); Louisville, Kentucky
- Occupation: journalist
- Notable credit(s): The New York Times, Los Angeles Times, National Journal, The Louisville Times, The Lexington Herald
- Spouse: Sharon LaFraniere
- Children: three children

Stephen Michael Wines (born June 3, 1951) is an American journalist. He is a national correspondent for The New York Times at present. Wines was previously the Times bureau chief in China, Johannesburg and Moscow.

== Early life and education ==
Wines graduated from Pleasure Ridge Park High School in Louisville, Kentucky. Later, Wines became a 1973 graduate of the University of Kentucky. He received his M.S. degree in journalism from the Columbia University Graduate School of Journalism in 1974.

== Career ==
After receiving his M.S. degree, Wines became a general assignment reporter for The Lexington Herald. Wines covered municipal and state government, politics and education for The Louisville Times from 1974 to 1981. He wrote about regulatory affairs and the U.S. Department of Justice for National Journal magazine from 1981 to 1984.

From 1984 to 1988, Wines was a Washington-based correspondent for the Los Angeles Times.

He has been bureau chief at international postings for The New York Times since 2002.

== Personal life ==
Wines is married and has three grown children.
