= Andy Greenberg =

American technology journalist

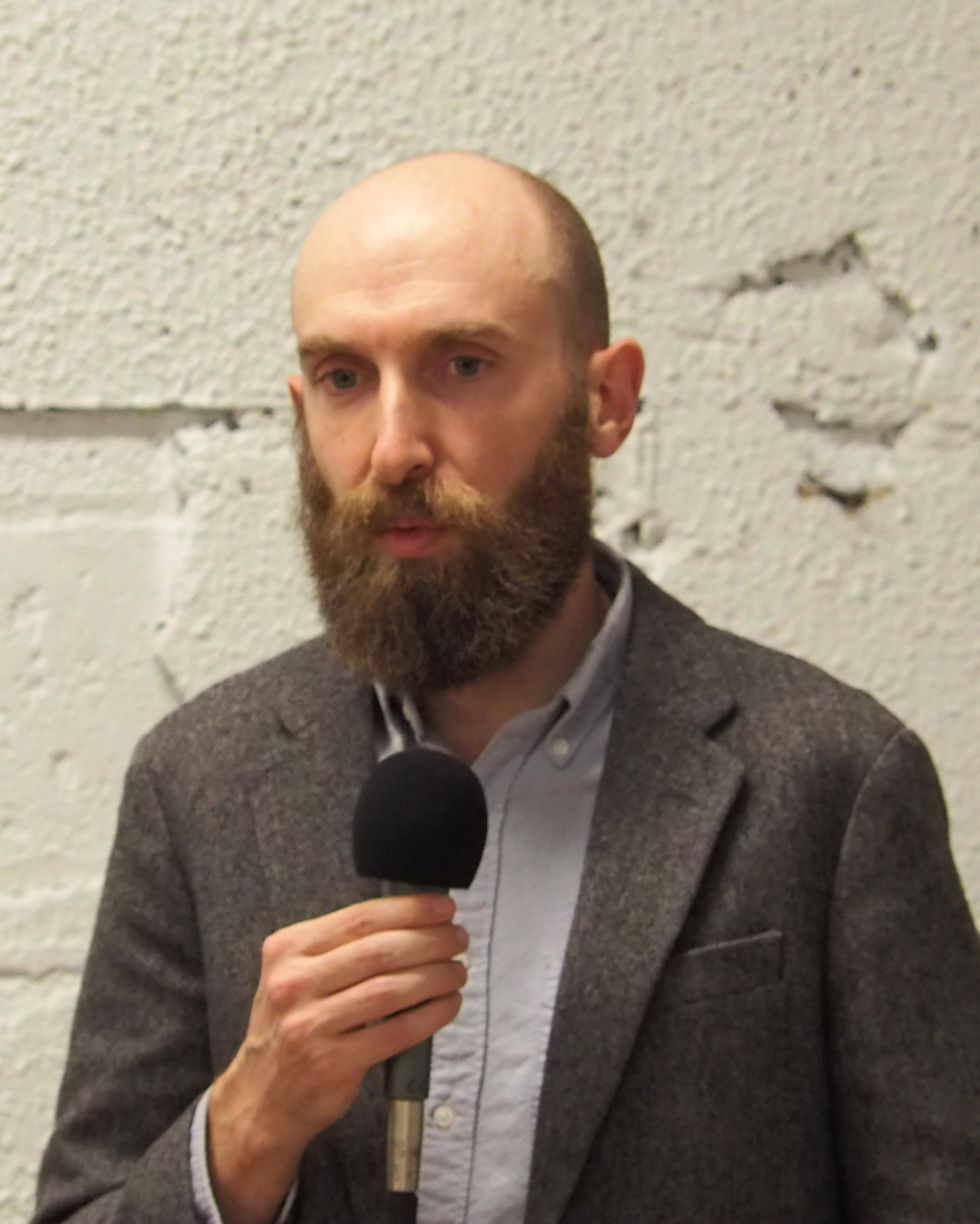
- Education: New York University, Haverford College, North Carolina School of Science and Mathematics, Beijing Foreign Studies University
- Occupation: Journalist
- Employer: Wired
- Spouse: Malika Zouhali-Worrall
- Website: andygreenberg.net

Andy Greenberg is a technology journalist serving as a senior writer at Wired magazine. He previously worked as a staff writer at Forbes magazine and as a contributor for Forbes.com. He has published the books This Machine Kills Secrets concerning whistleblowing, Sandworm, concerning the eponymous hacking group, and Tracers in the Dark, concerning cryptocurrency tracing as a law enforcement investigative technique.

== Writing ==
Greenberg's July 2015 article about Charlie Miller and Chris Valasek's Jeep hack resulted in the recall of 1.4 million vehicles by Chrysler. On the day of the article's publication, a Bill was introduced in the U.S. Senate seeking standards to protect cars against digital hacks.

Greenberg's 2012 book This Machine Kills Secrets was a New York Times Editors' Choice. He is featured in the 2015 documentary film Deep Web, about the trial of Ross Ulbricht.

In 2014, Greenberg was nominated along with Ryan Mac for a Gerald Loeb Award for their Forbes Magazine article, "Big Brother's Brain". The same year, he was named as one of the SANS Institute's Top Cybersecurity Journalist Award Winners. In 2013, his Forbes.com story "Meet The Hackers Who Sell Spies The Tools To Crack Your PC (And Get Paid Six-Figure Fees)" won "The Single Best Blog Post of the Year" award from the Security Bloggers Network.

He received the 2019 Gerald Loeb Award for International Reporting for an excerpt of his book Sandworm published in Wired, "The Code that Crashed the World: The Untold Story of NotPetya, the Most Devastating Cyberattack in History".

His 2019 book Sandworm focuses on Russia's cyberwar in Ukraine starting in 2014. It follows the trail of Russia's most active cyberwarfare unit, known as Sandworm, and describes how digital detectives unraveled its "Olympic Destroyer" malware and traced it so far that they could attribute it to Russia's military intelligence agency, the GRU.

An excerpt of his 2022 book Tracers in the Dark published in Wired, "The Crypto Trap: Inside the Bitcoin Bust That Took Down the Web's Biggest Child Abuse Site", received the 2023 Gerald Loeb award for Feature articles.

== Publications ==
- This Machine Kills Secrets: Julian Assange, the Cypherpunks, and Their Fight to Empower Whistleblowers. London: Penguin Group, 2012. ISBN 978-0142180495. OCLC 731911680.
- Sandworm: A New Era of Cyberwar and the Hunt for the Kremlin's Most Dangerous Hackers. New York: Knopf Doubleday, 2019. ISBN 978-0-385-54441-2. OCLC 1155069078.
- Tracers in the Dark: The Global Hunt for the Crime Lords of Cryptocurrency. New York: Doubleday, 2022. ISBN 978-0385548090. OCLC 1298713583.

== See also ==
- Computer worm
