= Dionne Searcey =

Investigative journalist

- Education: University of Nebraska–Lincoln (Degree in journalism and French)
- Occupation: Investigative journalist
- Employer: The New York Times
- Known for: Reporting on Boko Haram
- Awards: Michael Kelly Award; Pulitzer Prize; Gerald Loeb Award for Breaking News

Dionne Searcey is an American investigative journalist currently working for The New York Times.

== Biography ==
Dionne Searcey grew up in Wymore, Nebraska, where she attended the University of Nebraska–Lincoln and graduated with a degree in journalism and French. She began working as a reporter for the City News Bureau of Chicago. She also worked for Newsday, The Seattle Times and the Chicago Tribune before she got a took a job with The Wall Street Journal. There she worked as a national legal correspondent and investigative reporter. Her area was the telecom industry until she moved to The New York Times in 2014 and began to write about the American economy.

In 2015, Searcey became the West Africa bureau chief. She won the Michael Kelly Award for her reporting on Boko Haram, as well as a citation by the Overseas Press Club. In 2018, she partnered with Academy Award-winning director Kathryn Bigelow to make I Am Not A Weapon, video interviews with female survivors of Boko Haram. She was nominated for an Emmy Award for her stories on Boko Haram.

She won a Pulitzer Prize with The New York Times in 2020 for International Reporting: Russian Assassins and her contribution from the Central African Republic. She received the 2020 Gerald Loeb Award for Breaking News for "Crash in Ethiopia".

Her memoir In Pursuit of Disobedient Women was published in March 2020. Searcey is now the politics reporter at The New York Times.

She is married with children and lives in Brooklyn.

== See also ==
- New Yorkers in journalism
