= Natalie Edwards =

Whistleblower; former senior United States Treasury official

- Born: Natalie Mayflower Sours
- Other name: Dr. May Edwards
- Education: North Carolina Wesleyan College (B.S.); Virginia Commonwealth University (M.Ed., Ph.D.)
- Occupation: Intelligence officer
- Employer(s): United States Treasury; Central Intelligence Agency; Bureau of Alcohol, Tobacco, Firearms and Explosives; Virginia Commonwealth University; Chesterfield County Public Schools
- Known for: Disclosing suspicious activity reports (SARs) from October 2017 to October 2018 to BuzzFeed News some of which became the basis for the FinCEN Files and Pandora Papers
- Spouse: John Edwards Jr.
- Children: 1
- Conviction: Unlawfully Disclosing A Suspicious Activity Report
- Penalty: 6 months in prison and three years of supervised release

Natalie Mayflower Sours Edwards (born 1978) is a United States former senior official with the U.S. Department of the Treasury who was employed in the Financial Crimes Enforcement Network (FinCEN). Sarah Ellison of The Washington Post has called her "one of the most important whistleblowers of our era."

Edwards was arrested on October 16, 2018, for disclosing suspicious activity reports from October 2017 to October 2018 detailing Russia's interference in the 2016 presidential election to a reporter with BuzzFeed News, which published the series "The Money Trail". The SARs included money transfers and information about Maria Butina, Rick Gates, Paul Manafort, the Russian Embassy in the United States, and a Russian firm, Prevezon Alexander, LLC., involved with money laundering.

The Wall Street Journal identified the BuzzFeed News reporter as Jason Leopold. Edwards allegedly sent Leopold internal FinCEN emails, investigative memos and intelligence assessments, and the two were in regular contact. The New York Times characterized Edwards' case as procedurally different from that of James Wolfe, even though both cases involved leaking to reporters.

Edwards pled guilty in 2020, with a maximum sentence of up to five years.

In June 2021, she was sentenced to serve six months in prison and three years of supervised release, a sentence on the higher end of the relevant federal sentencing guidelines. Throughout her sentencing hearing, Edwards maintained that she was acting as a whistleblower and that she did not disclose the suspicious activity report, with malicious intent. Her counsel argued that she had gone through whistleblower channels and disclosed information only after she had been the subject of retaliation and believed that disclosing the information to the media would "help the American people", while prosecutors argued that "there has never been any substantive evidence of her claims" that she went through the proper internal channels and that Edwards lacked remorse for her decision to leak confidential information.

Edwards left prison in January 2022.
