= Red Card: How the U.S. Blew the Whistle on the World's Biggest Sports Scandal =

2018 book by Ken Bensinger

- Author: Ken Bensinger
- Publisher: Simon & Schuster
- Publication date: 2018
- Pages: 352
- ISBN: 978-1-5011-3390-9

Red Card: How the U.S. Blew the Whistle on the World's Biggest Sports Scandal is a book about corruption in FIFA by investigative journalist Ken Bensinger. It was published by Simon & Schuster in 2018.
