= Rania Abouzeid =

Lebanese Australian journalist

- Born: New Zealand
- Occupation: Journalist
- Known for: Middle east coverage
- Website: www.raniaabouzeid.com

Rania Abouzeid is a Lebanese Australian independent journalist who has extensively covered the war in Syria.

== Biography ==
Rania Abouzeid was born in New Zealand. She was raised in Australia regularly visiting Beirut to see family during holidays. Abouzeid attended the University of Melbourne, Australia. Since then she has worked for the New Yorker, TIME, Politico, The Guardian and many other publications. Abouzeid is based in Beirut. In 2014 her story The Jihad next door won a George Polk award as well as the Michael Kelly Award. Abouzeid won the Kurt Schork Award in International Journalism in 2013. Besides her print work, Abouzeid has created documentaries, her first being Syria: Behind Rebel Lines. She has also written books about the conflict. Abouzeid has been awarded fellowships from the European Council on Foreign Relations, Harvard, Columbia and New America. Her first book No Turning Back has won the Cornelius Ryan Award.

== Works ==
=== Books ===
- No Turning Back. Life, Loss, and Hope in Wartime Syria, 2018
- Sisters of the War: Two Remarkable True Stories of Survival and Hope in Syria, 2020

=== Documentaries ===
- Syria: Behind Rebel Lines, 2013
