= Margie Mason =

American journalist

- Born: Daybrook, West Virginia, U.S.
- Education: West Virginia University
- Occupation: Journalist
- Employer: Associated Press
- Title: Indonesian Bureau Chief

Margie Mason is an American, Pulitzer-winning journalist. She's a native of Daybrook, West Virginia and one of a handful of journalists who have been allowed to report from inside North Korea. Mason has traveled, as a reporter, to more than 20 countries on four continents. She has worked for the Associated Press for more than a decade, and is the Indonesian Bureau chief and Asian medical and human-rights writer in Jakarta, Indonesia. She was one of four journalists from the Associated Press who won the 2016 Pulitzer Prize for Public Service, the 2015 George Polk Award for Foreign Reporting, and the 2016 Goldsmith Prize for Investigative Reporting.

== Education and background ==
Mason was raised by her parents, Fred and Mary Mason, in Daybrook, West Virginia. She graduated from Clay-Battelle High School in 1993, in Monongalia County, West Virginia. In 1997, She graduated from West Virginia University Reed College of Media, (formerly known as West Virginia University Perley Reed School of Journalism).

In 1999, she was the recipient of a journalism fellowship in Asian studies, at the University of Hawaii, and was a 2009 Nieman Global Health fellow at Harvard. In 2017, she was awarded an honorary Doctorate of Humane Letters from West Virginia University.

== Career ==
At age 19, Mason, still a student at West Virginia University, worked for The Dominion Post, as a typist and eventually reporting as an intern. After graduation, she worked for the Associated Press, first in Charleston, West Virginia, and then at Jacksonville, Florida. After she received her fellowship from the University of Hawaii, in 1999, she worked for the Associated Press in San Francisco, California.

In 2000, Mason traveled to Vietnam for the first time, reporting on the 25th anniversary of the Fall of Saigon. She returned again in 2003, as an Associated Press correspondent in Hanoi.

In 2004 she reported from Indonesia on the Indian Ocean earthquake and tsunami, she also covered the bird flu, SARS, H1N1, and other disease outbreaks. In 2009, Masons coverage of the issue of global drug resistance won the 2010 Science in Society Journalism award for "When Drugs Stop Working," with fellow reporter, Martha Mendoza.

=== Reporting on slavery in Thailand's fishing fleets ===
A major milestone in Masons career was her work with other reporters on the staff of the Associated Press on the Pulitzer prize-winning series of stories about slave-labor in Thailand's fishing industry. The series was the product of over a year of investigative reporting, and led to the rescue of over 2000 slaves in the fishing trade. Following the reporting, the U.S. State Department began their own investigation and new legislation was passed to help close loopholes that allowed sales of products produced with slave labor.

Greenpeace launched a boycott of Thai Union and Chicken of the Sea and supply chains serving major U.S. companies such as Wal-Mart, Target Corporation, Kroger, Dollar General, Petco, Olive Garden, and Red Lobster, forcing them to refuse to make purchases from the Thai supplier.

The series of stories began running in March, 2015, as listed below.

- "US Supply Chain Tainted by Slave-Caught Fish," AP Video, March 24, 2015.
- "AP Investigation: Are slaves catching the fish you buy?" Robin McDowell, Associated Press, March 25, 2015.
- "AP Investigation prompts emergency rescue of 300 plus slaves," Robin McDowell and Margie Mason, Associated Press, April 3, 2015.
- "US lets in Thai fish caught by slaves despite law," Martha Mendoza, Associated Press, April 22, 2015.
- " Seafood from Slaves: 22 years a slave," Margie Mason, Associated Press, June 29, 2015.
- "AP Exclusive: AP tracks slave boats to Papua New Guinea," Robin McDowell, Martha Mendoza and Margie Mason, Associated Press, July 27, 2015.
- "AP Investigation prompts new round of slave rescues," Margie Mason and Martha Mendoza, July 30, 2015.
- "More than 2,000 enslaved fishermen rescued in 6 months," Ester Htusan and Margie Mason, Associated Press, September 17, 2015.
- "Global supermarkets selling shrimp peeled by slaves," Margie Mason, Robin McDowell, Martha Mendoza and Esther Htusan, Associated Press, December 14, 2015.

The reporting led to coverage in numerous US newspapers as well as international coverage.

==== Awards ====
Mason and the staff of the Associated Press won multiple awards for the coverage of slave-labor in the fishing industry and are listed below.

- 2015 The Hal Boyle Award for best newspaper reporting from abroad
- 2015 the AP's Oliver S. Gramling Journalism Award recognizing AP staffers for professional excellence
- 2015 University of Oregon's Ancil Award for Ethics in Journalism
- 2015 Arizona State University's Barlett & Steele (Gold) Award for Investigative Business Journalism
- 2015 George Polk Award for Foreign Reporting
- 2016 Pulitzer Prize for Public Service
- 2016 Goldsmith Prize for Investigative Reporting
- 2016 Anthony Lewis Prize for Exceptional Rule of Law Journalism
- 2016 Seldon Ring Award, recognizing investigative reporting that has had an impact and caused change
- 2016 Michael Kelly Award for the fearless pursuit and expression of truth
- 2021 Gerald Loeb Award for International for "Fruits of Labor", Associated Press
