= Sharon LaFraniere =

American journalist

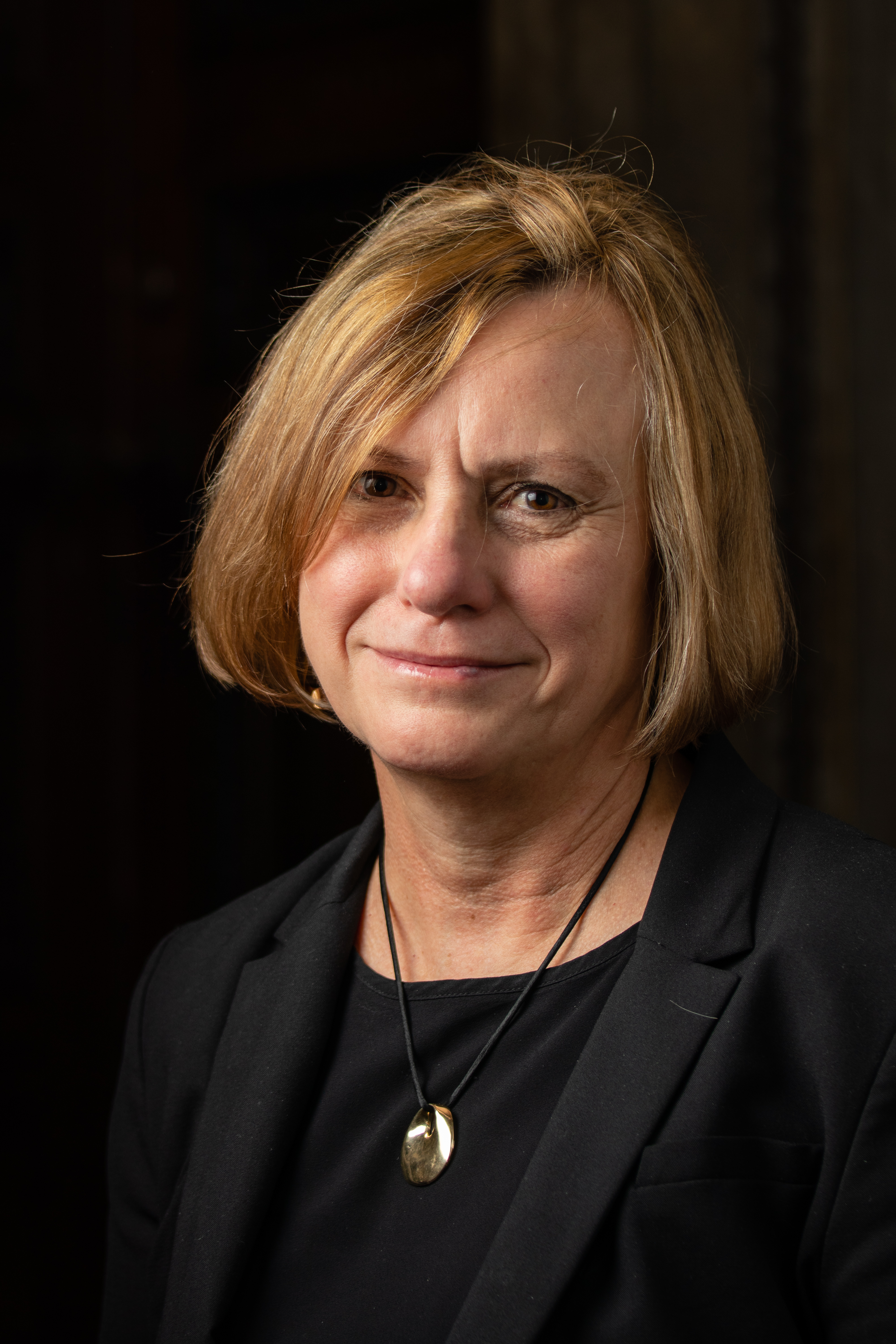
- LaFraniere in 2018
- Born: June 15, 1955 (age 71); Detroit, Michigan, U.S.
- Education: Brown University (BA); Northwestern University (MS)
- Occupation: Journalist
- Notable credit(s): The New York Times,The Washington Post
- Spouse: Michael Wines
- Children: 3

Sharon Veronica LaFraniere (born June 15, 1955) is an American journalist at The New York Times.

== Early life and education ==
LaFraniere was born in Detroit, Michigan. Her father was a car salesman, her mother worked various jobs. In 1973, she graduated from The Roeper School in Bloomfield Hills, Michigan, a private school she attended on an academic scholarship. As a high school student, she worked at a gas station, a pancake house, a hamburger diner, a grocery store and a Kentucky Fried Chicken outlet. As a college student, she worked as a waitress, a housekeeper, a typist, a researcher and a junior probation officer.

In 1977, LaFraniere earned a Bachelor of Arts degree in comparative literature, graduating magna cum laude and with honors from Brown University in Providence, Rhode Island on a full academic scholarship. She earned a Master of Science degree in 1979 in journalism from Northwestern University in Evanston, Illinois.

== Career ==
Now an investigative reporter in the Washington bureau of The New York Times, LaFraniere began her journalism career at The Louisville Times, then was hired by The Washington Post. At both papers, she won prizes for local and investigative reporting.

In 1998, The Washington Post sent LaFraniere to Moscow as a foreign correspondent, an assignment that took her into conflict zones in Afghanistan and Chechnya.

In 2003, LaFraniere joined The New York Times, based in Johannesburg. Her series on the struggles of women in Africa won the Michael Kelly Award in 2006.

She moved to Beijing in 2008 to cover China for The New York Times, sharing the 2013 Gerald Loeb Award for International for "China's Secret Fortunes". She joined the newspaper's investigative unit in New York in late 2012, then moved to Washington D.C. to help cover President Donald Trump.

In 2018, she and her colleagues won a Pulitzer Prize for National Reporting for their investigative reporting on the Trump team's links to Russia.

She was also part of two other New York Times teams of note. One team's coverage of the Trump administration's failed response to the COVID-19 pandemic was a Pulitzer Prize finalist in 2021. The second won the prize for breaking news from The Association for Business Journalists for their coverage of the Food and Drug Administration's approval of the coronavirus vaccine developed by Pfizer-BioNTech.

== Awards ==
- 1999 Overseas Press Club Award for business reporting.
- 2006 Michael Kelly Award.
- 2013 Gerald Loeb Award for International for "China's Secret Fortunes".
- 2018 Pulitzer Prize for National Reporting.
- 2021, finalist, Pulitzer Prize for National Reporting
- 2021, winner, The Association for Business Journalists, for breaking news on the COVID-19 pandemic.

== Personal life ==
She and her husband have three grown children.
