= Brandon Dunn =

American football player (born 1992)

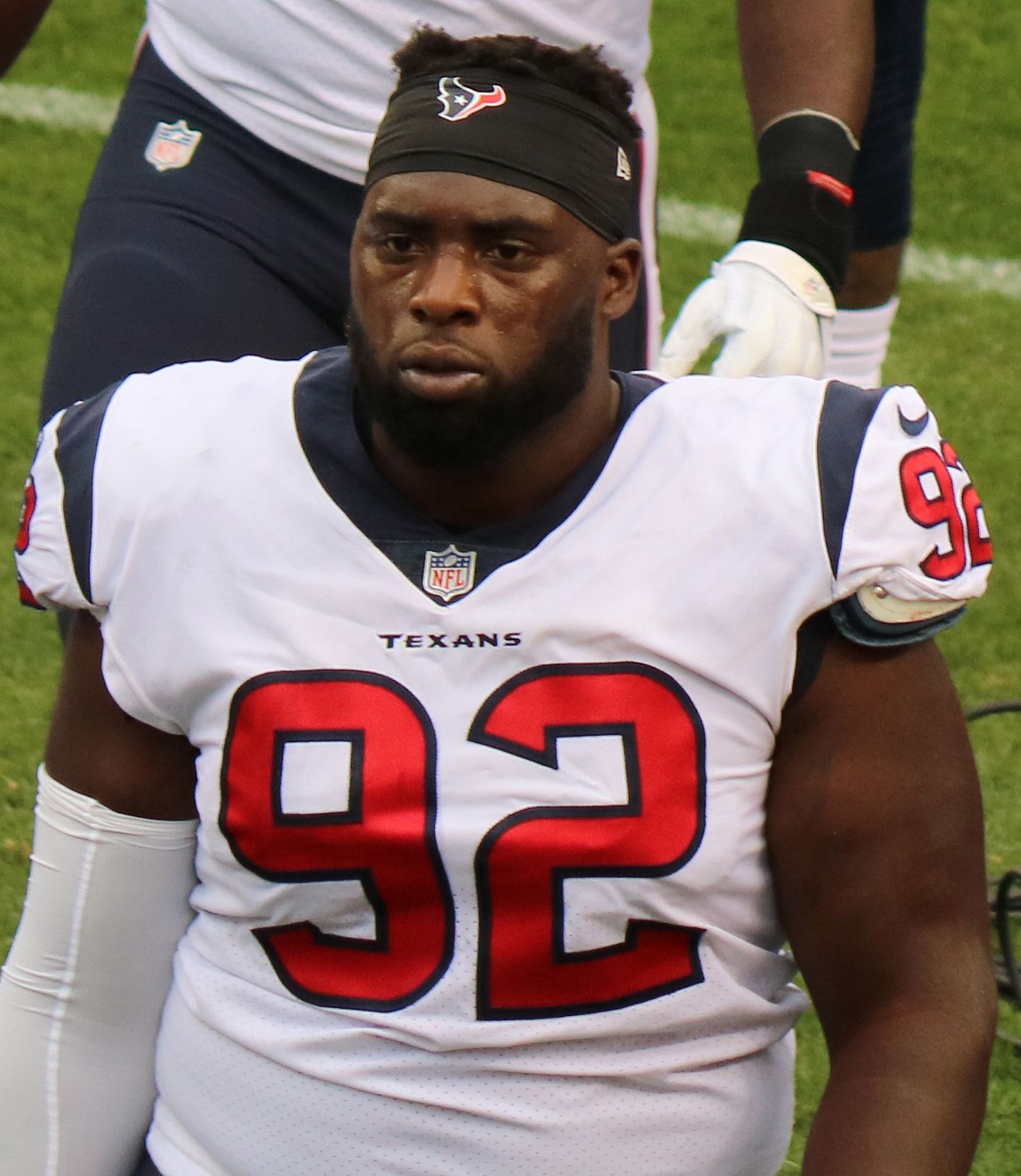
- Dunn with the Houston Texans in 2018

No. 98, 92
- Position: Nose tackle

Personal information
- Born: September 5, 1992 (age 34); Louisville, Kentucky, U.S.
- Listed height: 6 ft 2 in (1.88 m)
- Listed weight: 310 lb (141 kg)

Career information
- High school: Pleasure Ridge Park (Louisville)
- College: Louisville
- NFL draft: 2014: undrafted

Career history
- Chicago Bears (2014–2015); Houston Texans (2015–2020)

Career NFL statistics
- Total tackles: 114
- Sacks: 1.0
- Forced fumbles: 1
- Fumble recoveries: 2
- Pass deflections: 1
- Stats at Pro Football Reference

Brandon Dunn (born September 5, 1992) is an American former professional football player who was a nose tackle in the National Football League (NFL) for the Chicago Bears and Houston Texans. He played college football for the Louisville Cardinals.

== Early life ==
Dunn played high school football at Pleasure Ridge Park High School in Louisville, Kentucky, where he was a three-year starter and team captain. He was the team's Most Valuable Player and best offensive lineman in 2009. Dunn was also the team's top defensive lineman in 2008. He recorded 65 tackles and 16 sacks as a senior, including 30 solo tackles. He also recorded 50 tackles and 16 sacks his junior year.

== College career ==
Dunn played at the University of Louisville from 2010 to 2013. He played in 49 games for the Cardinals, starting 30. He recorded career totals of 101 tackles, 3 sacks, 2 fumble recoveries and 2 pass deflections.

== Professional career ==
Pre-draft measurables
Height	Weight	40-yard dash	10-yard split	20-yard split	20-yard shuttle	Three-cone drill	Vertical jump	Broad jump	Bench press
6 ft 2 in (1.88 m)	300 lb (136 kg)	5.16 s	1.77 s	2.98 s	4.87 s	7.66 s	29 1/2 in (0.75 m)	7 ft 1 in (2.16 m)	21 reps
All values from Louisville Pro Day

=== Chicago Bears ===
Dunn was signed by the Chicago Bears on May 11, 2014, after going undrafted in the 2014 NFL draft. He was released by the Bears on August 30 and signed to the team's practice squad on September 1, 2014. He was promoted to the active roster on November 26, 2014. Dunn made his NFL debut on November 27, 2014, against the Detroit Lions.

Dunn was released by the Bears on September 5, 2015, and signed to the team's practice squad on September 7, 2015. He was promoted to the active roster on September 19, 2015. Dunn was released by the Bears on October 3 and signed to the team's practice squad on October 6, 2015.

=== Houston Texans ===
Dunn was signed off the Chicago Bears' practice squad by the Houston Texans on October 13, 2015. On September 3, 2016, he was released by the Texans. Two days later, he was signed to the Texans' practice squad. He was promoted to the active roster on October 5, 2016. He was released on October 13, 2016. He was re-signed to the practice squad two days later. He was signed back to the active roster on October 19, 2016. He was released again on November 26, 2016, and was re-signed to the practice squad. He signed a reserve/future contract with the Texans on January 16, 2017.

On February 19, 2020, Dunn signed a three-year, $12 million contract extension with the Texans. He was placed on injured reserve on December 16, 2020. He was cut during training camp on August 19, 2021.
