= Pleasure Ridge Park High School =

Location
- 5901 Greenwood Road; Louisville, Kentucky; United States; 38.14448°N 85.8630°W

Information
- Type: Public Secondary Magnet
- Established: 1958
- School district: Jefferson County Public Schools
- Principal: Jason Stinson
- Teaching staff: 88.34 (FTE)
- Grades: 9–12
- Enrollment: 1,615 (2023–2024)
- Student to teacher ratio: 18.28
- Colors: Red and Black
- Mascot: Panthers
- Rival: Butler Traditional High School
- Newspaper: The Pawprint
- Website: sites.google.com/jefferson.kyschools.us/prphighschool/home

Pleasure Ridge Park High School is a public secondary school in the Pleasure Ridge Park neighborhood of Louisville, Kentucky. It is part of the Jefferson County Public Schools (Kentucky) district. It is next to Greenwood Elementary School and Valley Sports Little League.

The campus consists of five buildings: the Main Building, the Tech Building, the Large Gym, the E-Building, and the Fine Arts Auditorium. The main building consists of the Small Gym, the ITV room, the cafeteria, the library, two computer labs, the main office, and the counselor's office. The tech building consists of a computer lab, the weight room, and the seminar room.

Beginning in the 2017–18 school year, The JCPS Academies of Louisville at Pleasure Ridge Park began to rotate students throughout Pathway electives to gain exposure to programs prior to declaring a major. Then, at the end of their freshman year, students can choose a Pathway to follow for the rest of their high school career and possibly gain certification in their field of study.

The Pathways include the Academies of Business and Communication, Medical Sciences, and Engineering/Manufacturing/Design.

== Notable alumni ==
- Beanie Bishop, NFL cornerback
- Zack Cox, minor league baseball player
- Scott Downs, former Major League baseball player
- Brandon Dunn, NFL defensive end
- Taywan Taylor, NFL wide receiver for the Cleveland Browns
- Michael Wines, journalist

== See also ==
- List of public schools in Louisville, Kentucky
