= Peter Eisler =

American investigative journalist

- Born: New York City, U.S.
- Education: Trinity College (Connecticut)
- Occupation: Investigative journalist
- Employer: Reuters

Peter Eisler is an American investigative journalist for Reuters. He was a member of the Reuters team awarded the 2026 Pulitzer Prize for National Reporting. He previously spent more than two decades as a reporter at USA Today.

== Career ==
Eisler covers national affairs, public policy and government. His reporting has addressed subjects including environmental contamination, national security, public health and U.S. politics.

In 2000, Eisler won the Thomas L. Stokes Award for Energy and Environment Journalism from the National Press Foundation for his investigation into worker exposure and environmental contamination at private nuclear weapons production sites.

In 2007, Eisler investigated the Pentagon's delay in providing U.S. troops in Iraq with MRAP armored vehicles, a delay that lawmakers estimated may have cost hundreds of American lives. The investigation was named a finalist for the Michael Kelly Award.

Eisler and Alison Young reported on USA Today's "Ghost Factories" investigation, which examined lead contamination associated with former factory sites across the United States. The investigation received the 2013 Gerald Loeb Award for Online journalism, the Hillman Prize for Web Journalism, a Alfred I. duPont–Columbia University Award, and a Barlett & Steele Award for Investigative Business Journalism.

In 2014, Eisler received the Joseph D. Ryle Award for Excellence in Writing for "Nursing Homes' Broken Trusts," an investigation into the mismanagement of nursing home residents' trust funds. The same year, Eisler won a National Headliner Award for "When Health Care Makes You Sick," a series examining infections and medical errors that harmed patients.

In 2018, Eisler was among a team of Reuters journalists that received the Edgar A. Poe Award from the White House Correspondents' Association for "Shock Tactics," an investigation into deaths and injuries involving police use of Tasers.

Eisler was part of the Reuters team that produced "Dying Inside: The Hidden Crisis in America's Jails", an investigation into deaths in local jails across the United States. The project involved more than 1,500 public records requests and compiled data on 7,571 deaths between 2008 and 2019. In 2021, the series received the Robert F. Kennedy Journalism Award for Criminal Justice Reform and the 2021 Brechner Freedom of Information Award.

In 2022, Eisler was part of the Reuters team recognized with a George Polk Award for "Campaign of Fear," a series on threats and intimidation directed at U.S. election workers.

Eisler, Ned Parker, Aram Roston and Joseph Tanfani received the 2025 Toner Prize for Excellence in National Political Reporting for the Reuters series "The Politics of Menace."

In 2026, Eisler was among the Reuters journalists recognized with the Pulitzer Prize for National Reporting for reporting on the use of government power and political influence by U.S. President Donald Trump against perceived opponents.

Eisler also volunteers with the News Literacy Project.

== Personal life ==
Eisler lives in Washington, D.C., with his wife, Mimi Hall. Hall is a former White House correspondent for USA Today.
