= This Machine Kills Secrets =

2012 nonfiction book by Andy Greenberg

- Author: Andy Greenberg
- Language: English
- Publisher: Dutton
- Publication date: 2012
- Publication place: United States
- Pages: 370
- ISBN: 978-0-7535-4051-0

This Machine Kills Secrets is a 2012 book by Andy Greenberg about "how WikiLeakers, cypherpunks, and hacktivists aim to free the world's information." The book looks at "a revolutionary protest movement bent not on stealing information, but on building a tool that inexorably coaxes it out, a technology that slips inside of institutions and levels their defenses like a Trojan horse of cryptographic software and silicon." The interview with Julian Assange which served as a launching point for the book was published by Forbes, and was read nearly a million times.

The book looks at the history of "politically motivated information leaks ... the lives and work of numerous cryptographers, hackers and whistleblowers", including WikiLeaks and the people involved. It talks about WikiLeaks being modeled on Nicolas Bourbaki, and how it could be infiltrated by informers, harassed or spied on.

== See also ==
- Crypto-anarchism
- This machine kills fascists – Slogan coined by Woody Guthrie
