= Gerald Loeb Award winners for International =

American journalism award

The Gerald Loeb Award is given annually for multiple categories of business reporting. The "International" category was first awarded in 2013.

== Gerald Loeb Award for International (2013–present) ==
- 2013: "China's Secret Fortunes" by David Barboza and Sharon LaFraniere, The New York Times

Articles in Series:
1. "Billions Amassed in the Shadows By the Family of China's Premier", October 26, 2012
2. "Lobbying, a Windfall and a Leader's Family", November 25, 2012
3. "Chinese Regulator's Relatives Profited From Stake in Insurer", December 31, 2012
4. "China 'Princelings' Using Family Ties to Gain Riches", May 18, 2012

- 2014: "The Shortest Route to Riches" by Kerry A. Dolan and Rafael Marques de Morais, Forbes
- 2015: "Product of Mexico" by Richard Marosi and Don Bartletti, Los Angeles Times
- 2016: “Malaysia’s Missing Millions,” by Tom Wright, Bradley Hope, Simon Clark, Mia Lamar, Justin Baer, Tom Di Fonzo, and Paolo Bosonin, The Wall Street Journal
- 2017: "Venezuela Undone" by Hannah Dreier and Ricardo Nunes, Associated Press

Articles in Series:
1. "Amid food crisis, life on the line in Venezuela", July 11, 2016
2. "Life on the line in Venezuela as exonomic crisis worsens", July 12, 2016
3. "Middle-class Venezuelans liquidate savings to stockpile food", July 18, 2016
4. "Venezuela military trafficking food as country goes hungry", December 28, 2016

- 2018: "China's Surveillance State" by Josh Chin, Liza Lin, Eva Dou, Clément Bürge, Wenxin Fan, Natasha Khan, Dan Strumpf, Charles Rollet, Jeremy Page, Elliot Bentley, Jenny O'Grady, Tyler Paige, and Giulia Marchi, The Wall Street Journal
- 2019: Andy Greenberg, Wired

Article:

"The Code that Crashed the World: The Untold Story of NotPetya, the Most Devastating Cyberattack in History", August 2, 2018

- 2020: "WhatsApp International" by Mehul Srivastava, Tom Wilson, Tim Bradshaw, and Robert Smith, Financial Times
- 2021: "Fruits of Labor" by Margie Mason and Robin McDowell, Associated Press

Articles in Series:
1. "Palm oil abuses linked to world's top brands, banks", September 23, 2020
2. "US says it will block palm oil from large Malaysian producer", September 30, 2020
3. "Rape, abuses in palm oil fields linked to top beauty brands", November 17, 2020
4. "US bans second Malaysian palm oil giant over forced labor", December 30, 2020

- 2022: "China Propaganda" by Paul Mozur, Raymond Zhong, Jeff Kao, Aaron Krolik, Aliza Aufrichtig, Muyi Xiao, Nailah Morgan, and Gray Beltran, The New York Times and ProPublica

Articles:
1. "Beijing Silenced Peng Shuai in 20 Minutes, Then Spent Weeks on Damage Control" by Paul Mozur, Muyi Xiao, Jeff Kao, and Gray Beltran, December 8, 2021
2. "How Beijing Influences the Influencers" by Paul Mozur, Raymond Zhong, Aaron Krolik, Aliza Aufrichtig, and Nailah Morgan, December 13, 2021
3. "Buying Influence: How China Manipulates Facebook and Twitter" by Muyi Xiao, Paul Mozur and Gray Beltran, December 20, 2021
4. "A Digital Manhunt: How Chinese Police Track Critics on Twitter and Facebook" by Muyi Xiao and Paul Mozu, December 31, 2021

- 2023: "The Amazon Undone", by Terrence McCoy, The Washington Post

Articles in Series:
1. "Death in the forest", March 17, 2022
2. "Devouring the rainforest" with Júlia Ledur, April 29, 2022
3. "The god of São Félix" with Cecília do Lago, July 27, 2022
4. "A failure of enforcement", August 30, 2022
