= Tom Vanden Brook =

Journalist

Tom Vanden Brook is a journalist who has worked for USA Today since 2000. Vanden Brook took his undergraduate degree in history and a master's degree in journalism at the University of Wisconsin–Madison. Prior to USA Today, he worked as a reporter at The Milwaukee Journal and The Milwaukee Journal Sentinel. He has covered the Department of Defense for the newspaper since April 2006.

Vanden Brook has attracted attention after reporting on Pentagon information operations programs run by private contractors. His reporting claimed that the efficacy of the programs in Afghanistan and Iraq, that have cost hundreds of millions of dollars, has not been ascertained. His reporting also is critical of the Pentagon's use of private contractors such as Leonie Industries in lieu of trained military personnel.

== Reputation attack ==
Vanden Brook became part of an apparent disinformation campaign that aimed to besmirch his professional reputation linked to his reporting on the Pentagon's information operations programs. According to a story by Gregory Korte in USA Today, Vanden Brook and Ray Locker were the targets of an "information operations" campaign in which websites based on their names were registered and Facebook and Twitter accounts were created using their names without their permission. In addition, a Wikipedia entry allegedly was created as part of the campaign to create and manipulate an information profile on the Internet. These actions occurred simultaneously with their reporting on the vast cost-overruns at the Pentagon's "information operations" programs in Afghanistan and Iraq. If the activities were by the Pentagon or its contractors and used federal funds, the perpetrators would have violated federal law prohibiting the creation of propaganda targeting a domestic audience. The Pentagon denied having any knowledge of the activities and said that its information operations contractors also denied targeting Vanden Brook and Locker. In May 2012, Camille Chidiac, minority owner and former president of the Pentagon's top propaganda contractor Leonie Industries, accepted personal responsibility for the operation. Leonie Industries insisted that any public roles played recently by Chidiac on behalf of the company were purely informal. The Department of Defense distanced itself explicitly from the smear campaign. In October 2012, four months after the Pentagon renewed its contract with Leonie Industries, its Investigator General announced a criminal investigation into the company due to the incident.

=== Fake websites ===
Fake websites, including sites domains using the journalists' names and a Word Press site for Vanden Brook were created by unknown parties. Vanden Brook was the first target of the apparent "reputation attack" (as Andy Beal, the chief executive of social media monitoring firm Trackur, labeled it), followed by Locker after his byline was added to the articles on the Pentagon's information operations program. As part of the campaign, their reporting was added to the sites, as well as such information as a bio on Vanden Berg from the Michael Kelly Award web site, but more insidious postings such as accusing them of being agents of the Taliban also were added. The sites subsequently were taken offline after the journalists made inquiries.

=== Wikipedia entry ===
According to USA Today, a new user to Wikipedia created a page on Vanden Brook on February 8, 2012. The entry alleged that Vanden Brook "'gained worldwide notoriety' for his 'misreporting' of the 2006 Sago Mine disaster in West Virginia." Wikipedia editors removed the page and banned the user.

=== Twitter accounts ===
As part of spreading misinformation, such as legitimating criticism of Vanden Brook's reporting, a bogus @Tomvandenbrook Twitter account defended his reporting of the Sago Mine disaster to another allegedly fake Twitter account.

== Awards and recognition ==
Vanden Brook was nominated for a Michael Kelly Award in 2008 and 2012.
