= National Targeting Center =

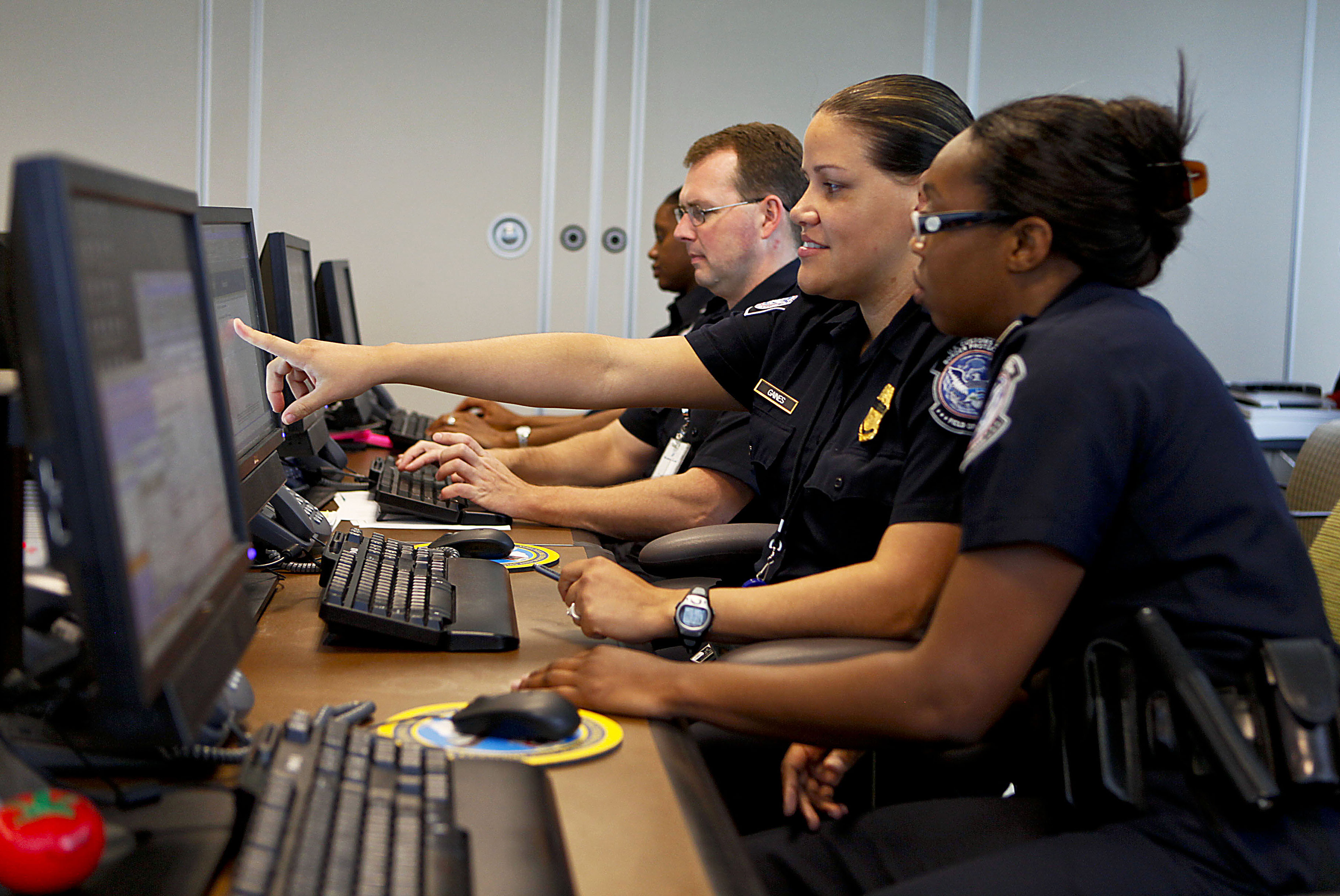
US Customs and Border Protection Field Operations perform daily operational duties at the National Targeting Center (NTC)

The National Targeting Center (NTC) is a division of U.S. Customs and Border Protection (CBP). It is based in Sterling, Virginia. The NTC observes air traffic and trade activities, gathers and vets intelligence, and is empowered to send e-mails requesting that U.S. citizens be detained and questioned.

The National Targeting Center includes several divisions, including: NTC-Cargo, NTC-Passenger, Counter-Network, and National Targeting Center – Investigations (NTC-I). The latter was established in 2013.

The NTC was initially established in 2001; its original name was Office of Border Security.

In 2017, the NTC approached journalists "as part of a broader effort to get reporters to write about forced labor around the world as a national security issue." The journalists included Ali Watkins and Martha Mendoza. The issue came to light from a redacted Inspector General report given to the Associated Press.

In 2021, CBP launched an investigation of the NTC's targeting of journalists, members of Congress, and others. In 2022, CBP agreed to release to the U.S. Senate the Inspector General's report previously leaked to the Associated Press, in exchange for Senate approval of an employee.
