= Kenneth P. Vogel =

American journalist and author (born 1975)

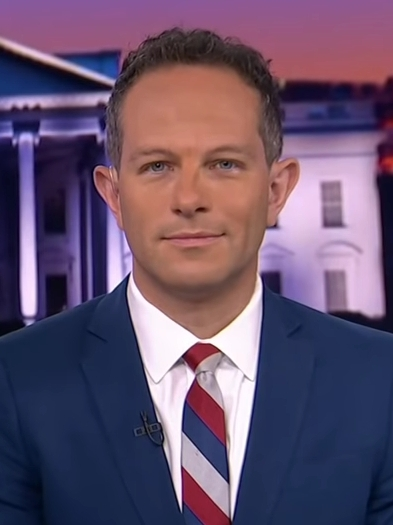
- Vogel in 2018
- Born: August 9, 1975 (age 51)
- Education: University of Wisconsin–Madison
- Occupations: Journalist, author
- Employer: The New York Times

Kenneth Paul Vogel (born 1975) is an American journalist and author who currently reports for The New York Times. From 2007 to 2017, he was the founding chief investigative reporter at Politico. In June 2017, he joined the Washington Bureau of The New York Times as a reporter covering conflicts of interest, lobbying, and money in politics.

Vogel is the author of Big Money: 2.5 Billion Dollars, One Suspicious Vehicle, and a Pimp–on the Trail of the Ultra-Rich Hijacking American Politics. Vogel's writing often focuses on money in politics. As part of his work, he focuses on political fundraising, with particular emphasis on the political activities of the Koch brothers.

== Early life and education ==
Vogel grew up in Philadelphia, Pennsylvania. He graduated from the University of Wisconsin–Madison.

== Career ==
Vogel has reported for The News Tribune in Tacoma, Washington, Times Leader in Wilkes-Barre, Pennsylvania, The Journal Inquirer in Manchester, Connecticut, and the Center for Public Integrity. He joined Politico prior to its 2007 launch. Vogel's book, Big Money: 2.5 Billion Dollars, One Suspicious Vehicle, and a Pimp—on the Trail of the Ultra-Rich Hijacking American Politics, was published in 2014 and received generally favorable reviews from the Wall Street Journal, Economist, Financial Times.

In 2016, a WikiLeaks email interception revealed that Vogel had sent a draft of an investigative news article he authored about Hillary Clinton's fundraising with the Democratic National Committee (DNC) ahead of publication to a DNC official. Business Insider referred to Vogel's sharing of a pre-publication draft as "a break from typical journalistic ethics." The Washington Post's media critic Erik Wemple defended Vogel's ethics, writing that Vogel was "bringing the full weight of a Politico investigation to the DNC and the Clinton campaign, as if to say: We've got all this stuff on you. What say you?" The article led PolitiFact to revise its rating of a claim that "the overwhelming amount" of money raised at a Clinton fundraiser would go to down-ballot Democrats; in light of Vogel's reporting, the fact-checking organization changed its assessment from "Mostly True" to "Half True." Vogel's articles have been named among the best investigative news stories on campaign finance.

== Personal life ==
Vogel is married to Danielle Rosengarten, an attorney and former climate change adviser to Joe Lieberman. He is a son of Ruth S. and Morris J. Vogel of New York. His mother is a clinical psychologist in private practice in New York. His father is the president of the Lower East Side Tenement Museum.

== Awards ==
- 2000: IRE Award for "Our Private Legislatures — Public Service, Personal Gain"
- 2020: Gerald Loeb Award for Breaking News for "Crash in Ethiopia", The New York Times

== Bibliography ==
- Vogel, Kenneth (June 3, 2014). Big Money: 2.5 Billion Dollars, One Suspicious Vehicle, and a Pimp–on the Trail of the Ultra-Rich Hijacking American Politics. PublicAffairs. ISBN 978-1610393393.
- "Our Private Legislatures — Public Service, Personal Gain"
