= Jason Leopold =

American investigative reporter (born 1969)

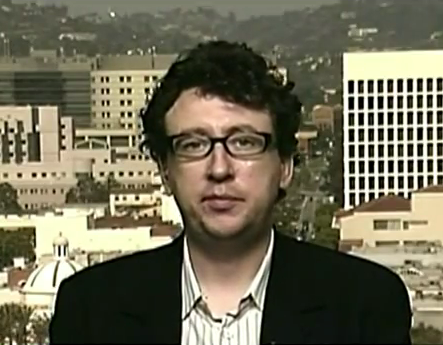
- Leopold on RT America in March 2012
- Born: October 7, 1969 (age 57)
- Occupation: Journalist

Jason Arthur Leopold (born October 7, 1969) is an American investigative reporter who writes for Bloomberg News. He was previously an investigative reporter for BuzzFeed News, Al Jazeera America, and Vice News. He worked at Truthout as a senior editor and reporter, a position he left after three years on February 19, 2008, to co-found the web-based political magazine The Public Record, Leopold's profile page on The Public Record now says he is Editor-at-Large. Leopold returned to Truthout as Deputy Managing Editor in October 2009 and was made lead investigative reporter in 2012 before leaving Truthout in May 2013. He makes extensive use of the Freedom of Information Act to research stories.

Leopold was the journalist who forced the release of all of Hillary Clinton's emails through the Freedom of Information Act. He was identified by the Transactional Access Clearinghouse as "by far the most active individual FOIA litigator in the United States today." He has written stories on a many subjects including in the past decades on BP, Enron, the California Energy Crisis, the Bush administration's torture policies, and the Plame affair. His pieces have been published in The Guardian, Asia Times, the Los Angeles Times, The Wall Street Journal, CBS MarketWatch, The Nation, and Utne Reader. He has also written about foreign and domestic policy online for publications such as The Guardian, Alternet, CounterPunch, Common Dreams, The Huffington Post, Political Affairs Magazine, The Raw Story, Scoop, ZNet and others.

== Career ==
Leopold began his career in 1992, writing obituaries for The Reporter Dispatch newspaper in White Plains, New York. He became the crime and courts reporter for the Whittier Daily News in 1997 and then moved to the City News Service where he covered court trials. Leopold next worked as a city editor and reporter for the Los Angeles Times. He then worked for Dow Jones Newswires as its Los Angeles bureau chief. Leopold was later the US correspondent for 95bFM in Auckland, New Zealand.

In 2020, Natalie Edwards pled guilty to leaking FinCEN information to Leopold, including internal FinCEN emails, investigative memos and intelligence assessments.

=== California energy crisis ===
Leopold was referred to as "one of the most aggressive reporters" on the California energy crisis by Jill Stewart, a columnist for the now-defunct New Times LA newspaper in Los Angeles. An article Leopold wrote for CBS Marketwatch about Enron's role in the California energy crisis was cited during a floor speech by Sen. Dianne Feinstein (D-California) and read into the Congressional Record on June 10, 2003, as Congress was debating energy policy.

=== Enron ===
Leopold's reporting on Enron was featured in a National Public Radio special broadcast, "Blind Trust." According to Publishers Weekly, Leopold was "one of the few reporters who'd actually interviewed Enron President Jeff Skilling" following Enron's bankruptcy in December 2001.

=== Salon article removal ===
In September 2002, following a two-week investigation, Salon removed from its website an article authored by Leopold about Army Secretary Thomas E. White's role in the Enron collapse, due to questions about the validity of an e-mail and allegations that portions of the article had not been adequately credited to the Financial Times. The disputed e-mail was said to have been from White, telling the recipient to "Close a bigger deal to hide the loss." According to Salon, Leopold's article "used seven full paragraphs amounting to 480 words, virtually verbatim, from the FT. There were two attributions to the FT within the passage, but they appeared to apply only to the specific sentences that contained them, not to the full passage." Leopold later admitted that he had been careless by not providing the FT with additional credit, but insisted that Salon's editors had all the relevant documents, including the disputed White email, before the story was published. Paul Krugman of The New York Times, who wrote a piece based in part on Leopold's work, also had to backpedal, acknowledging that he should not have cited the e-mail.

Salon removed the story from its website and said that Leopold had plagiarized text from the FT, but the article remains in the Nexis archives. Leopold said he had slightly misquoted the email, which should have read "Close a bigger deal. Hide the loss before the 1Q". White denied sending the email in a letter he sent to The New York Times, and when Salon's editors contacted Leopold's source, the source denied speaking to him. The Village Voice reported, "Obviously, Leopold made mistakes, but it's not at all clear they justify a full repudiation of the story or a revocation of his journalistic license. As Paul Krugman told the Voice, 'Everything else in that story checked out. The substance of his reporting was entirely correct.'" Commenting on the case, Kerry Lauerman of Salon said that "Leopold definitely represents the dark side of the web ... he became this sort of hero for throngs of people online".

=== Books ===
Prior to the publication of News Junkie, Leopold's book was titled Off the Record. The book's publisher, according to The Washington Post report, said the book has been dropped for "business reasons". The Post wrote that it was canceled following reported legal threats from Steven Maviglio, the press secretary to former Governor Gray Davis, who, according to the manuscript, invested in energy companies using inside information. The author of the Washington Post story about Leopold's book, Howard Kurtz, was featured in News Junkie. Leopold called him "lazy".

In the book, Leopold also revealed many secrets about his life such as a prior drug addiction, bouts with mental illness and suicide attempts. He also disclosed how he lied to employers about a criminal conviction for larceny that took place when Leopold was in his 20s and working in the record business.

Publishers Weekly wrote of News Junkie that "While there's a lot of lying admitted to in this scrappy memoir, from Leopold's hiding of his criminal past to his playing of sources to get his scoops, it's (probably) not an untruthful memoir—indeed, it might become required reading for aspiring journalists." The book was on the Los Angeles Times' Bestsellers / Paperbacks list on June 11, 2006 and July 16, 2006.

=== Karl Rove indictment claim ===
On May 13, 2006, Leopold reported on Truthout that Karl Rove had been indicted by the grand jury investigating the Plame affair. Rove spokesman Mark Corallo denied the story, calling it "a complete fabrication". Truthout vigorously defended the story saying variously that it had two or three "independent sources", before the executive director, Marc Ash, issued a statement apologizing for "getting too far out in front of the news-cycle". The grand jury concluded with no indictment of Rove.

In his memoir, Courage and Consequence, Karl Rove addressed the Leopold article. Rove writes that Leopold is a "nut with Internet access" and that "thirty-five reporters called [Robert] Luskin or Corallo to ask about the Truthout report". According to Rove, "Fitzgerald got a kick out of the fictitious account and e-mailed Luskin to see how he felt after such a long day".

=== Safety issues at BP ===
Leopold's investigative reporting on safety issues at BP has been cited by CNN, 60 Minutes and the Los Angeles Times.

60 Minutes cited a report by Leopold, published at Truthout as a source for their episode on May 16, 2010, about the BP oil spill and the whistleblower who was warning about a possible blowout at another BP deepwater drilling site. Digital Journal wrote up the story and also cited the Truthout report. CNN's Randi Kaye in an article also cited a report by Leopold on Mark Kovak's inside knowledge about the safety concerns at the Prudhoe Bay, Alaska BP oil field. On July 8, 2010, Los Angeles Times reporter Kim Murphy cited Leopold's investigation into neglect and cost-cutting practices at Alyeska Pipeline in her report on the resignation of Alyeska's CEO one day after Leopold's report was published at Truthout. On July 14, 2010, the United States House of Representatives Committee on Transportation and Infrastructure held a hearing in the Subcommittee on Railroads, Pipelines and Hazardous Materials. The hearing, titled "The Safety of Hazardous Liquid Pipelines (Part 2): Integrity Management," cited an investigative report by Leopold, published at Truthout as a document for the committee's investigation.

=== Air Force training material ===
In 2011, Truthout featured a story by Leopold about religious material used by the US Air Force in the training of officers on the ethics of nuclear war. The material, obtained by the Military Religious Freedom Foundation from Freedom of Information Act requests, includes slides quoting the Bible supporting the act of war and characters from the Bible fighting what the slides refer to as just wars, as well as quotes from SS officer Wernher von Braun. The Air Force removed the material from its training regime a day after Leopold's story was published, with David Smith, chief of public affairs of Air Education and Training Command, telling Leopold (The material) "has been taken out of the curriculum and is being reviewed," and "The commander reviewed it and decided we needed to have a good hard look at it and make sure it reflected views of modern society."

=== Use of psycho-active drugs on Guantanamo captives ===
In 2010 Leopold and psychologist and human rights worker Jeffrey Kaye requested information on the use of psycho-active drugs on Guantanamo captives. Captives and former captives had been reporting medical staff collaborating with interrogators to drug captives with powerful psychoactive drugs prior to interrogation since the very first captives release. The report from the Pentagon Inspector General was declassified, and in which the Pentagon concludes that the injections were flu shots, IV hydration (sometimes post-hunger strike), and medical treatment with or without consent, and "were not mind-altering drugs for interrogation purposes". The report does say that a detainee was given a routine flu shot, and was told that the shot was a truth serum or hallucinogen "as a ruse".

=== Work at Vice News and usage of the Freedom of Information Act ===
Leopold worked at Vice News from 2014 to 2017. His prolific use of the Freedom of Information Act has caused him to be labeled a "FOIA terrorist". He is the journalist whose Freedom of Information Act lawsuit forced the State Department to release all of Hillary Clinton's emails on a monthly basis. He has been widely noted in the media as responsible for sensitive information disclosures including abusive treatment of prisoners at Guantanamo Bay.

=== Refuted Cohen allegations ===
On January 18, 2019, Leopold co-authored an explosive report that alleged Donald Trump directed his personal lawyer Michael D. Cohen to lie to Congress about the Moscow tower project, a construction deal at the heart of an investigation by the special counsel Robert S. Mueller III. The report attracted attention because such an action by Trump would constitute a felony. Democratic congressmen publicly mused impeachment.

The report came under scrutiny, however, after Mueller's press broke precedent by issuing a statement that said some details attributed to the special counsel's office were untrue, and other news organizations were unable to corroborate the findings with reports of their own. After the publication of the story, Trump's attorney Rudy Giuliani went on CNN and said Trump might have spoken to Cohen about his congressional testimony. Giuliani also inadvertently confirmed other details about the BuzzFeed story, such as the fact that negotiations over the tower extended well into 2016. The Washington Post opined that Michael Cohen's testimony to the House Oversight Committee largely confirmed the thrust of the report but contradicted key details.

With the release of the Mueller report in April 2019, the report found that while there was evidence that Trump was aware that Cohen had provided false testimony to Congress, "the evidence available to us does not establish that the President directed or aided Cohen's false testimony." Ben Smith, then-editor-in-chief of Buzzfeed News, responded by releasing notes from the FBI interview with Cohen, which said "Cohen told OSC (Mueller's office) he was asked to lie by DJT/DJT Jr., lawyers." Smith said, "Our sources — federal law enforcement officials — interpreted the evidence Cohen presented as meaning that the president 'directed' Cohen to lie. We now know that Mueller did not."

On April 5, 2019, Leopold co-authored a story that was presented as an update to the January 2019 story. The April story referenced a 12-page memo submitted by Cohen's legal counsel to Congress that said President Trump "encouraged Cohen to lie and say all Moscow Tower project contacts ended as of January 31, 2016 using 'code' language." Subsequently, on April 18, 2019, the original Cohen report was updated to state that the "Mueller report found that Trump did not direct Michael Cohen to lie."

== Awards and achievements ==
Leopold is an Emmy nominated producer, the recipient of the FOI Award from Investigative Reporters and Editors and a member of the team awarded the Tom Renner Award in 2018 from Investigative Reporters and Editors, and a member of the team named a finalist for the Pulitzer Prize in international reporting. He was also a Pulitzer finalist in 2021 as one of the lead reporters on the FinCEN Files investigation, a collaboration between BuzzFeed News and the International Consortium of Investigative Journalists. The FinCEN Files also won The Tom Renner award in 2021. Leopold also won a George Polk award and a Loeb award for health reporting and investigative reporting. Leopold was inducted into the National Freedom of Information Hall of Fame by the Newseum Institute in 2016.

His stories have appeared three times on Project Censored's top-25 under-reported stories of the year: once in 2004, for a story he wrote about an alleged secret meeting Arnold Schwarzenegger had with Ken Lay before the film star's being elected Governor of California, for a story he wrote on Halliburton in 2005, and again in 2011 for a story he wrote on a controversial "spiritual fitness test" the Army required all of its enlisted soldiers.

In 2008, Leopold received the Thomas Jefferson Award from the Military Religious Freedom Foundation.

He shared the 2023 Gerald Loeb Award for investigative business journalism for "Profit, Pain, and Private Equity".

Leopold won the Brechner Freedom of Information Award in 2026 given by the Joseph L. Brechner Freedom of Information Project at the University of Florida College of Journalism and Communications. The award cited 'his tenacity and passion in acquiring public records.'

== Bibliography ==
- News Junkie, 2006 (ISBN 0-9760822-4-1).
