= Martha Mendoza =

Pulitzer Prize-winning Associated Press journalist

Martha Mendoza (born August 16, 1966) is an American journalist. Her reporting for the Associated Press has helped free over 2,000 enslaved fishermen and prompted action by the U.S. Congress and the White House.

She earned her first Pulitzer Prize in the Investigative Reporting category in 2000 as part of a team of Associated Press (AP) journalists that uncovered the massacre of Korean civilians by U.S. soldiers at the No Gun Ri bridge during the Korean War. Her second Pulitzer in 2016, for reporting that revealed seafood widely available in U.S. stores was being processed by slave labor in Southeast Asia, was the AP's first Pulitzer Prize for Public Service in its history. On September 21, 2020, Mendoza won an Emmy Award for her collaboration documentary "Kids Caught in the Crackdown" produced by Frontline and PBS.

As of 2017, she was an AP national reporter based in Northern California and a member of AP's Global Investigative Team. She has specialized in reporting on human trafficking in Asia since 2015.

== Early life and career ==
Martha Mendoza was born on August 16, 1966, in Los Angeles, California, to parents of Ashkenazi Jewish descent. Her grandfather, Theodore E. Cummings, served as the United States Ambassador to Austria in 1981. Mendoza's father, Harry Snyder, is an attorney who served as Peace Corps director in Nepal and Western Samoa and as associate Peace Corps director in India. Harry Snyder is now an Advocacy Leader in Residence at the University of California, Berkeley. Mendoza graduated from the University of California Santa Cruz in 1988. In college, Mendoza played soccer for the UC Santa Cruz Banana Slugs, wrote for the school newspaper City on a Hill Press and played French horn in the school symphony. She became an Associated Press reporter in 1995, starting in Albuquerque, New Mexico. She has since reported from Silicon Valley, New York, New Mexico, Mexico City and Bangkok, covering everything from human trafficking to cyber security.

In 2001, she was a John S. Knight Journalism Fellow at Stanford University and a Ferris Professor of Humanities at Princeton University in 2007. She has taught in the University of California Santa Cruz Science Communications Program for over a decade.

== No Gun Ri massacre investigation ==
Between September 29 and December 28, 1999, Mendoza and fellow AP journalists Choe Sang-hun and Charles J. Hanley published nine investigative reports centering on atrocities committed against civilians during the Korean War. This reporting earned the AP team the 2000 Pulitzer Prize in Investigative Reporting "for revealing, with extensive documentation, the decades-old secret of how American soldiers early in the Korean War killed hundreds of Korean civilians in a massacre at the No Gun Ri Bridge," according to the Pulitzer award citation.

Until the AP report, South Korean survivors of the bridge massacre "met only rejection and denial" from the U.S. Army and the South Korean government, according to the first investigative piece in September 1999. The articles by Mendoza, Choe, and Hanley "deeply shocked" Americans and prompted then-U.S. Secretary of Defense William Cohen to appoint a blue-ribbon panel of American investigators to travel to South Korea and investigate the claims.

Mendoza and the AP team faced deep skepticism about the report from senior AP editors and executives, with the executive editor of the AP telling the reporters in March 1999 that he didn't believe the report should be published. The report was not published until six months later. Mendoza called the investigation and internal debate over publication "a difficult and frustrating process."

== 2016 Pulitzer Prize for "Seafood from Slaves" ==
Mendoza earned her second Pulitzer Prize in 2016 as part of the AP reporting team, along with Esther Htusan, Margie Mason, and Robin McDowell, that exposed the use of forced labor in the fishing industry in Southeast Asia and its connections to seafood sales in the United States. This was the AP's first Pulitzer Prize for Public Service in its history. Their work also earned them the 2016 Gerald Loeb Award for Investigative business journalism.

The investigation centered on the tiny Indonesian island of Benjina, where men from Myanmar were enslaved, held in cages, and forced to fish. The AP journalists talked to over 40 current and former slaves on the island, used satellites to track a ship that carried slave-processed fish from the island to a port in Thailand and followed trucks carrying the fish to factories. "We were able to search and find the companies in Thailand that were then shipping to the United States," Mendoza told PBS NewsHour, "and go to these American seafood distributors to figure out where their fish ends up." The reporters eventually tracked the fish to major retailers in the United States from Wal-Mart to Whole Foods. The reporting process took over 18 months and the reporters faced dangers from mafia gunmen to angry fishing company officials.

"It was a bear to write this story – it was a very long, complicated story," Mendoza later reflected, "How do we do this? How do we convey to people that these could be your brothers and sons, not just some far-off person with a name you don’t understand?" In a Reddit Ask Me Anything session, Mendoza highlighted the report and noted that "there is more oversight in seafood to protect dolphins than there is to protect humans."

The expose by Mendoza and the AP team, titled "Seafood from Slaves," ultimately freed more than 2,000 slave fishermen and led to arrests, ship seizures, and legislation in the U.S. Congress.

== Other investigations ==
In 2011, Mendoza led a major investigation into countries with freedom of information laws as part of the AP global freedom of information project. The investigation involved using freedom of information procedures in 105 countries and the European Union to request answers on expert-vetted questions about terrorism. Mendoza and her team found that over half of the countries don't follow their own right-to-know laws.

Mendoza has also continued her journalistic focus on forced labor and seafood issues. An October 2017 AP report by Mendoza, Tim Sullivan, and Hyung-jin Kim traced salmon available at major U.S. stores like Wal-Mart and Aldi to North Korean forced labor in China. In June 2018, Mendoza and AP colleagues Robin McDowell and Margie Mason reported that the U.S. seafood distributor Sea to Table, which guarantees its seafood is "wild and directly traceable to a U.S. dock," was actually importing some of its yellowfin tuna from abroad and engaging in illegal labor and fisheries practices.

In 2018, Mendoza and fellow AP journalist Garance Burke reported on child migrants forcibly separated from parents at the U.S.-Mexico border. They reported that 14,300 migrant children had been sent to crowded detention centers, including at least three "tender age" shelters in South Texas for young children and babies. Their stories were part of a package of AP immigration reporting recognized as a finalist for a 2019 Pulitzer Prize.

== Investigation into Mendoza ==
In 2017 the U.S. Customs and Border Protection (CBP), through its Counter Network Division, a unit dedicated to tracking terrorists, investigated Mendoza and other journalists including Ali Watkins; CBP had been tasked with combating forced labor in the Congo. In 2021, the Associated Press demanded "an immediate explanation from U.S. Customs and Border Protection as to why journalists including AP investigative reporter Martha Mendoza were run through databases used to track terrorists and identified as potential confidential informant recruits."
