= Courtney Kube =

American television journalist

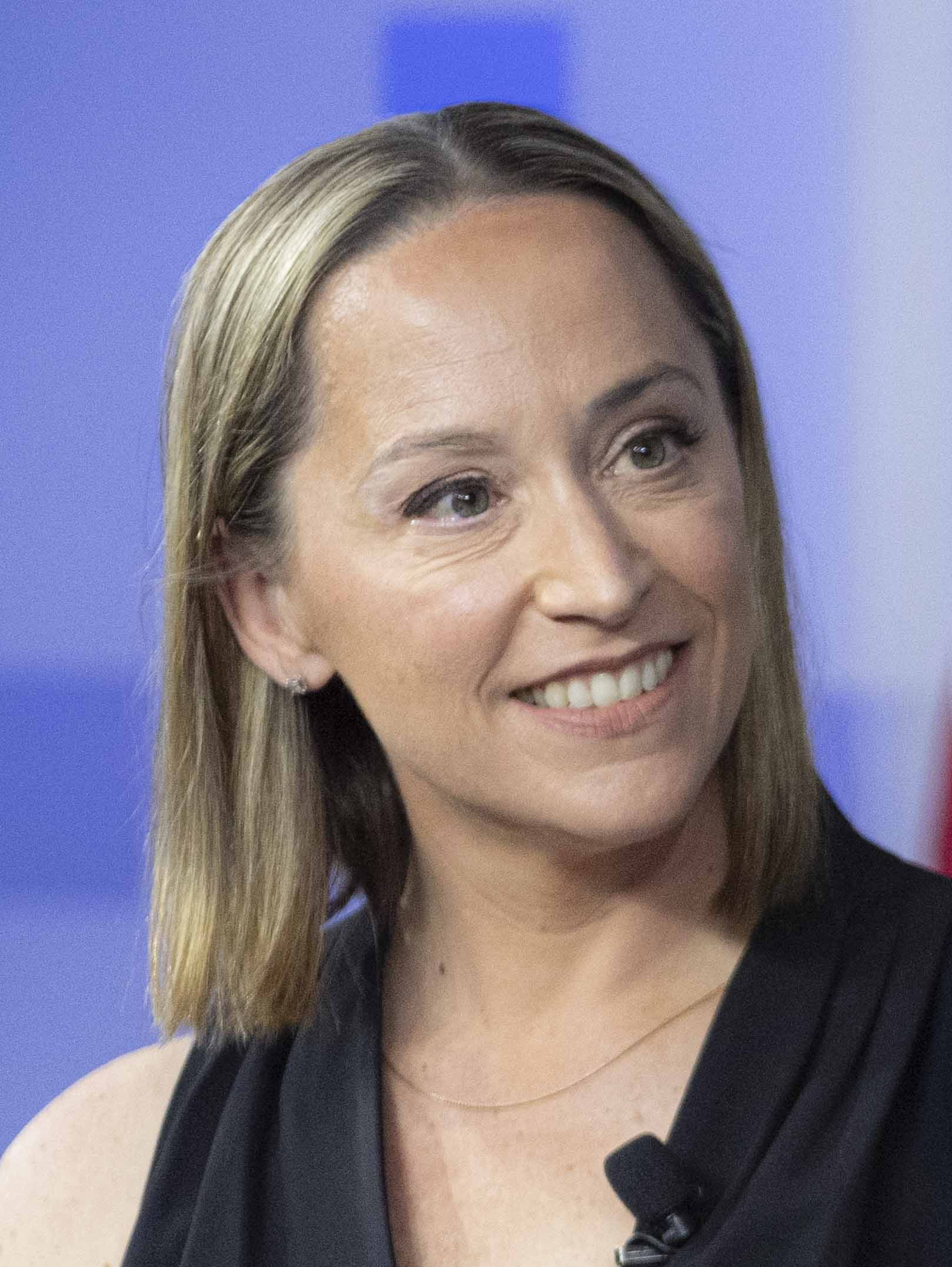
- Kube in 2024
- Born: Bethesda, Maryland
- Occupation: Journalist
- Years active: 2001–present
- Title: NBC News Senior National Security and Pentagon Correspondent
- Spouse: Eric Dent (Marine Officer)
- Children: 3

Courtney Kube is an American television journalist who works with NBC News as a senior national security correspondent covering the Pentagon and national security appearing on NBC News and MSNBC.

She was also a producer for NBC journalist Jim Miklaszewski for his live shots from the Pentagon and his reports on NBC News within Washington D.C. and abroad. They co-authored reports on national security topics, including a story in 2012 about Navy SEALS and concerns over the exposure of classified information.

Kube won the "Tex" McCrary Award for Excellence in Journalism for her reporting. She then won the award at the Congressional Medal of Honor Society's Award Gala. She was also honored when receiving it at the gala in Knoxville, Tennessee for her versatility of continued reporting.

In 2019, one of Kube's children interrupted her MSNBC live news segment live on-air while she was talking about the Turkish invasion of Syria.
