= Julia-Ambra Verlaine =

American financial journalist

Julia-Ambra Verlaine is an American financial journalist. A former markets reporter for The Wall Street Journal and correspondent for Bloomberg News, she was a recipient of the 2022 Gerald Loeb Award for Breaking News as part of the Journal team recognized for its coverage of the GameStop short squeeze, reporting that also received a 2022 New York Press Club Award and a 2021 Front Page Award from the Newswomen's Club of New York.

== Career ==
Verlaine holds a bachelor's degree from Georgetown University. Before entering journalism, she worked on the foreign exchange desk at Barclays in London and New York.

For Bloomberg News, she covered financial markets and investment banking from London, reporting that JPMorgan Chase reaped a gain of as much as $300 million amid the turmoil that followed the Swiss National Bank's removal of its currency cap in January 2015. Her European coverage also included Uber's clash with taxi regulations in Brussels and the November 2015 Brussels security lockdown following the Paris terror attacks.

From the Wall Street Journal's Brussels bureau, she covered financial regulation in the European Union and the implications of Brexit for the financial industry, writing a column titled "Verlaine's Take" and reporting with Max Colchester on financial firms relocating from London. She joined the Journal's financial markets team in New York in 2020, where she covered market turmoil during the COVID-19 pandemic, reporting with colleagues including Nick Timiraos and Liz Hoffman on stress in the Treasury market and the banking system.

In January 2021, Verlaine conducted the first interview given by Keith Gill, the trader whose Reddit posts helped drive the GameStop rally, in a front-page article datelined from Boston. Her coverage of the GameStop trading frenzy, with Journal colleagues Juliet Chung, Gunjan Banerji, Caitlin McCabe, and Akane Otani, won the 2022 Gerald Loeb Award in the Breaking News category. She appeared as herself in the 2022 Netflix documentary series Eat the Rich: The GameStop Saga, which was produced in conjunction with The Wall Street Journal.

== Awards ==
- Gerald Loeb Award, Breaking News (2022, shared), for "The GameStop Frenzy," The Wall Street Journal
- New York Press Club Award for Journalism, Business Reporting, National – Newspaper (2022, shared), for "The GameStop Frenzy," The Wall Street Journal
- Front Page Award, Specialized Reporting: Business (2021, shared), Newswomen's Club of New York, for The Wall Street Journal's GameStop coverage, including "Keith Gill Drove the GameStop Reddit Mania. He Talked to the Journal."
