= Eva Dou =

Eva Dou is an American journalist who reports on technology policy for The Washington Post. She previously was the China political news reporter for The Wall Street Journal.

Dou grew up in Detroit. She graduated from the Missouri School of Journalism in 2012. She joined the Washington Post in February 2020.

In 2025, Dou published the book House of Huawei: The Secret History of China's Most Powerful Company. It was nominated for the SABEW Best in Business Book Award. It was shortlisted for the Financial Times and Schroders Business Book of the Year Award.
