= Serena Ng =

American economist

- Born: 1959 (age 66–67)

Academic background
- Education: Princeton University (Ph.D.); University of Western Ontario (B.A., M.A.)

Academic work
- Discipline: macroeconomics, econometrics
- Institutions: Columbia University
- Website: Information at IDEAS / RePEc

Serena Ng (born 1959) is the Edwin W. Rickert Professor of Economics at Columbia University. Her fields of research and interest include macroeconomics, time series, econometrics, and big data.

== Education ==
Ng received a B.A. and M.A. from University of Western Ontario. Later, she did her Ph.D. at Princeton University in 1993.

== Career ==
She was an associate professor at Boston College and Johns Hopkins University from 1996 to 2003. She later became a professor in University of Michigan from 2003 to 2007. She has been a professor at Columbia University since 2007. Ng is also a research associate with the National Bureau of Economic Research.

She was the co-editor of the Journal of Business and Economic Statistics from 2007 to 2009. She has been the managing editor of the Journal of Econometrics since 2019.
