= United States Senate Select Committee on Intelligence =

Legislative committee

Senate Select Committee on Intelligence
Select committee
- Active United States Senate; 119th Congress

History
- Formed: May 19, 1976
- Succeeded: Church Committee

Leadership
- Chair: Tom Cotton (R); Since January 3, 2025
- Vice Chair: Mark Warner (D); Since January 3, 2025

Structure
- Seats: 17 members
- Political parties: Majority (9): Republican (9); Minority (8): Democratic (7); Independent (1)

Jurisdiction
- Purpose: to "oversee and make continuing studies of the intelligence activities and programs of the United States Government"
- Oversight authority: United States Intelligence Community
- House counterpart: House Permanent Select Committee on Intelligence

Meeting place
- 211 Hart Senate Office Building; Washington, D.C.

Website
- intelligence.senate.gov

Rules
- Rules of Procedure of the Select Committee on Intelligence

The US Senate Report on CIA Detention Interrogation Program that details the use of torture during CIA detention and interrogation.

The United States Senate Select Committee on Intelligence (sometimes referred to as the Intelligence Committee or SSCI) is dedicated to overseeing the United States Intelligence Community—the agencies and bureaus of the federal government of the United States that provide information and analysis for leaders of the executive and legislative branches. The Committee was established in 1976 by the 94th Congress.

The Committee is "select" in that membership is temporary and rotated among members of the chamber. The committee comprises 15 members. Eight of those seats are reserved for one majority and one minority member of each of the following committees: Appropriations, Armed Services, Foreign Relations, and Judiciary. Of the remaining seven, four are members of the majority, and three are members of the minority. In addition, the Majority Leader and Minority Leader are non-voting ex officio members of the committee. Also, the Chair and Ranking Member of the Committee on Armed Services (if not already a member of the select Committee) are ex officio members.

As part of its oversight responsibilities, the Committee performs an annual review of the intelligence budget submitted by the president and prepares legislation authorizing appropriations for the various civilian and military agencies and departments comprising the intelligence community. These entities include the Office of the Director of National Intelligence, Central Intelligence Agency, Defense Intelligence Agency, National Security Agency, National Geospatial-Intelligence Agency, National Reconnaissance Office, as well as the intelligence-related components of Department of State, Federal Bureau of Investigation, Department of the Treasury, and Department of Energy.

The Committee makes recommendations to the Senate Armed Services Committee on authorizations for the intelligence-related components of the U.S. Army, U.S. Navy, U.S. Air Force, and U.S. Marine Corps. The Committee also conducts periodic investigations, audits, and inspections of intelligence activities and programs.

== History ==
The Select Committee on Intelligence was preceded by the Church Committee (1975). Senator Daniel K. Inouye (D-Hawaii) became the first chair of the committee when it was established and remained in the role until 1979.

On July 8, 2004, the committee issued the Report of the Select Committee on Intelligence on the U.S. Intelligence Community's Prewar Intelligence Assessments on Iraq, and on June 5, 2008, it issued a long-delayed portion of its "phase two" investigative report, which compared the prewar public statements made by top Bush administration officials to justify the invasion with the intelligence information that was available to them at that time.

In a March 6, 2008, letter to the Senate leadership, 14 of the 15 then members of the Committee proposed the creation of a new Senate Appropriations Subcommittee on Intelligence to prepare the annual intelligence budget. The proposed Subcommittee, on which members of the Intelligence Committee would be heavily represented, would increase the Committee's influence and leverage over executive branch intelligence agencies, and require continuing disclosure of the annual budget for the National Intelligence Program. The proposal has been opposed by the leadership of the Senate Appropriations Committee, however.

In 2013, and beyond, the SSCI received renewed attention in the wake of Edward Snowden's disclosures regarding the NSA surveillance of communications. Senator Dianne Feinstein and the SSCI made several statements on the matter, one of which was notably disputed: that the NSA tracked US citizens' locations via cellphone. Later, the SSCI Staff Director, David Grannis, claimed that the NSA did not collect cellphone location, claiming the Senator was "speaking extemporaneously". The SSCI later came to prominence in relation to voting to publish in March 2014 and then publishing in December 2014 of a report on the policies of the CIA on torture.

In 2017, the SSCI began investigating Russian interference in the 2016 United States elections, possible incriminating links between members of the Russian government and members of Donald Trump's presidential campaign team, and the security of election processes in the United States. On April 21, 2020, the SSCI (chaired at the time by the Republican Richard Burr) released a much redacted report with its final judgment that the intelligence community's assessment was "coherent and well-constructed"; the SSCI therefore supports the intelligence community's claim that Putin's "interference in the 2016 U.S. presidential election" in favor of candidate Trump was unprecedented in its "manner and aggressiveness". Nevertheless, no direct evidence of collusion between the Trump campaign and Russia was found.

In 2018, the SSCI Director of Security James Wolfe was arrested and convicted of lying to the FBI on the leak of classified documents to a reporter with whom he was in an affair.

On May 14, 2020, Senator Burr, who oversaw the probe on Russian interference in the 2016 election, stepped down as SSCI chair due to an ongoing investigation regarding insider trading by Senator Burr during the COVID-19 pandemic. Senator McConnell announced on May 18, 2020 that Marco Rubio would replace Burr temporarily.

== Members, 119th Congress ==
Majority	Minority
Tom Cotton, Arkansas, Chair; Jim Risch, Idaho; Susan Collins, Maine; John Cornyn, Texas; Jerry Moran, Kansas; James Lankford, Oklahoma; Mike Rounds, South Dakota; Todd Young, Indiana; Ted Budd, North Carolina	Mark Warner, Virginia, Vice Chair; Ron Wyden, Oregon; Martin Heinrich, New Mexico; Angus King, Maine; Michael Bennet, Colorado; Kirsten Gillibrand, New York; Jon Ossoff, Georgia; Mark Kelly, Arizona
Ex officio
Roger Wicker, Mississippi; John Thune, South Dakota	Jack Reed, Rhode Island; Chuck Schumer, New York

== Historical committee membership ==
=== 118th Congress ===
Majority	Minority
Mark Warner, Virginia, Chair; Dianne Feinstein, California (until September 29, 2023); Ron Wyden, Oregon; Martin Heinrich, New Mexico; Angus King, Maine; Michael Bennet, Colorado; Bob Casey, Pennsylvania; Kirsten Gillibrand, New York; Jon Ossoff, Georgia; Mark Kelly, Arizona (from October 17, 2023)	Marco Rubio, Florida, Vice Chair; Jim Risch, Idaho; Susan Collins, Maine; Tom Cotton, Arkansas; John Cornyn, Texas; Jerry Moran, Kansas; James Lankford, Oklahoma; Mike Rounds, South Dakota
Ex officio
Jack Reed, Rhode Island; Chuck Schumer, New York	Roger Wicker, Mississippi; Mitch McConnell, Kentucky

=== 117th Congress ===
Majority	Minority
Mark Warner, Virginia, Chair; Dianne Feinstein, California; Ron Wyden, Oregon; Martin Heinrich, New Mexico; Angus King, Maine; Michael Bennet, Colorado; Bob Casey, Pennsylvania; Kirsten Gillibrand, New York	Marco Rubio, Florida, Vice Chair; Richard Burr, North Carolina; Jim Risch, Idaho; Susan Collins, Maine; Roy Blunt, Missouri; Tom Cotton, Arkansas; John Cornyn, Texas; Ben Sasse, Nebraska
Ex officio
Jack Reed, Rhode Island; Chuck Schumer, New York	Jim Inhofe, Oklahoma; Mitch McConnell, Kentucky

=== 116th Congress ===
Majority	Minority
Richard Burr, North Carolina, Chair (until May 15, 2020); Marco Rubio, Florida, Acting Chair (from May 18, 2020); Jim Risch, Idaho; Susan Collins, Maine; Roy Blunt, Missouri; Tom Cotton, Arkansas; John Cornyn, Texas; Ben Sasse, Nebraska	Mark Warner, Virginia, Vice Chair; Dianne Feinstein, California; Ron Wyden, Oregon; Martin Heinrich, New Mexico; Angus King, Maine; Kamala Harris, California; Michael Bennet, Colorado
Ex officio
Jim Inhofe, Oklahoma; Mitch McConnell, Kentucky	Jack Reed, Rhode Island; Chuck Schumer, New York

Source: Member list

=== 115th Congress ===
Majority	Minority
Richard Burr, North Carolina, Chair; Jim Risch, Idaho; Marco Rubio, Florida; Susan Collins, Maine; Roy Blunt, Missouri; James Lankford, Oklahoma; Tom Cotton, Arkansas; John Cornyn, Texas	Mark Warner, Virginia, Vice Chair; Dianne Feinstein, California; Ron Wyden, Oregon; Martin Heinrich, New Mexico; Angus King, Maine; Joe Manchin, West Virginia; Kamala Harris, California
Ex officio
Jim Inhofe, Oklahoma (from September 6, 2018); John McCain, Arizona (until August 25, 2018); Mitch McConnell, Kentucky	Jack Reed, Rhode Island; Chuck Schumer, New York

Source: Member List

== Chairs ==
Name	Party	State	Start	End
Frank Church	Democratic	Idaho	1975	1976
Daniel Inouye	Democratic	Hawaii	1976	1978
Birch Bayh	Democratic	Indiana	1978	1981
Barry Goldwater	Republican	Arizona	1981	1985
David Durenberger	Republican	Minnesota	1985	1987
David Boren	Democratic	Oklahoma	1987	1993
Dennis DeConcini	Democratic	Arizona	1993	1995
Arlen Specter	Republican	Pennsylvania	1995	1997
Richard Shelby	Republican	Alabama	1997	2001
Bob Graham	Democratic	Florida	2001	
Richard Shelby	Republican	Alabama	2001	
Bob Graham	Democratic	Florida	2001	2003
Pat Roberts	Republican	Kansas	2003	2007
Jay Rockefeller	Democratic	West Virginia	2007	2009
Dianne Feinstein	Democratic	California	2009	2015
Richard Burr	Republican	North Carolina	2015	2020
Marco Rubio; Acting	Republican	Florida	2020	2021
Mark Warner	Democratic	Virginia	2021	2025
Tom Cotton	Republican	Arkansas	2025	present

== Ranking members ==
Name	Party	State	Start	End
John Tower	Republican	Texas	1975	1976
Clifford Case	Republican	New Jersey	1976	1977
Barry Goldwater	Republican	Arizona	1977	1981
Pat Moynihan	Democratic	New York	1981	1985
Patrick Leahy	Democratic	Vermont	1985	1987
William Cohen	Republican	Maine	1987	1991
Frank Murkowski	Republican	Alaska	1991	1993
John Warner	Republican	Virginia	1993	1995
Bob Kerrey	Democratic	Nebraska	1995	1999
Richard Bryan	Democratic	Nevada	1999	2001
Bob Graham	Democratic	Florida	2001	
Richard Shelby	Republican	Alabama	2001	2003
Jay Rockefeller	Democratic	West Virginia	2003	2007
Kit Bond	Republican	Missouri	2007	2011
Saxby Chambliss	Republican	Georgia	2011	2015
Dianne Feinstein	Democratic	California	2015	2017
Mark Warner	Democratic	Virginia	2017	2021
Marco Rubio	Republican	Florida	2021	2025
Mark Warner	Democratic	Virginia	2025	present

== Staff directors ==
- Christopher Joyner, 2015–2022
- David Grannis, 2009–2014
- Andy Johnson, 2004–2008
- Alfred Cumming, 2000–2003
- George Tenet, 1989–1993
- Nicholas Rostow, 1999-2000

== See also ==
- U.S. Senate report on CIA torture
- James R. Clapper § Testimony to Congress on NSA surveillance programs, 2013
- List of United States Senate committees
- United States House Permanent Select Committee on Intelligence
- United States Senate Committee on Armed Services
- The Report (2019 film)
