= Rohingya refugee crisis =

Rohingya refugee crisis may refer to:

- 2015 Rohingya refugee crisis, the displacement of Muslim Myanmar nationals from Myanmar to neighboring countries in 2015
- Rohingya genocide, a similar crisis in 2016–17
