= LaurenZside =

American YouTuber and author (born 1989)

- Born: Lauren Weber; 7 July 1989 (age 37); New York, U.S.
- Occupations: YouTuber; content creator; author
- Years active: 2007–present
- Spouse: Bobby (m. 2016)
- Children: 2

YouTube information
- Channel: LaurenZside
- Years active: 2007–present
- Genre: Gaming
- Subscribers: 10 million
- Views: 5 billion
- Last updated: October 21, 2026

Lauren Weber (born July 7, 1989), better known online as LaurenZside, is an American YouTuber and content creator. Recognized by Forbes as one of YouTube's top female gaming channels, she is primarily known for her let's play videos—particularly featuring Minecraft and The Sims 4—as well as reaction and lifestyle content.

Active on the platform since the late 2000s, Weber developed a distinct style incorporating narrative elements and characters into her gameplay. Beyond her YouTube channel, she expanded her career into mainstream media and publishing by hosting the YouTube Original series Secret Saboteurs in 2022 and releasing her debut graphic novel, Going Under, in 2025.

== Early life ==
Lauren Weber was born on July 7, 1989, and grew up with an older half-sister, Christine, and a younger brother, Ryan. Her family moved to Upstate New York, where she attended Catholic school before transferring to a public high school. When Weber was 15, her father died of lung cancer, one year after his diagnosis. Following his death, she experienced depression and struggled with negative influences during her teenage years.

After graduating from high school, Weber studied communications and television production in college. She later transferred to a university in New York City to continue her education. Around the time she was finishing college, she began dating Bobby, a friend and fellow intern whom she later married in 2016.

== Career ==
Weber created her YouTube channel in 2007 while in middle school, initially uploading videos as a hobby before pausing to focus on her education. After earning a degree in communications and television production, she worked as a production assistant, freelance teleprompter operator, and administrative assistant across the media and sports industries.

She returned to the platform after discovering gaming content, beginning with gameplay videos intended to practice her filmmaking, storytelling, and social media skills. Her channel gained traction through videos featuring Minecraft and The Sims 4, particularly those that recreated characters and settings from other franchises, such as Five Nights at Freddy’s. As the channel's revenue increased, she left her traditional employment to pursue content creation full-time.

Weber developed a distinctive style by integrating structured characters and narratives into her gameplay. She regularly analyzed platform trends and experimented with video formats, titles, and thumbnails to grow her audience.

Expanding her career into mainstream media and publishing, Weber hosted the YouTube Original Secret Saboteurs, which premiered on March 14, 2022. She then signed with the Creative Artists Agency in 2024 and released her debut graphic novel in August 2025, Going Under which explores a world where creepypastas and urban legends coexist with reality.

In a February 2022 feature by Forbes, Weber discussed her career transition from part-time creator to running one of YouTube's prominent female gaming channels. During the interview, she detailed how she leveraged her background in video production to build an audience, emphasizing the importance of authenticity, independent storytelling, and sustained community engagement in digital media.

== Personal Life ==
Weber announced her first pregnancy on November 7, 2020. After going into labor on May 6, 2021, she gave birth to her daughter, Melody, on May 10, 2021. She subsequently announced a second pregnancy on December 8, 2023, and welcomed her second daughter, Madison, on June 14, 2024. Later that year, on December 12, 2024, Weber shared that her dog, Dexter, had died.

== Filmography ==
=== Web ===
Year	Film	Role	Notes	Ref.
2020	MC Championship	Herself	MC Championship 5 and 12	
2025	Secret Saboteurs	Herself	Host	

== Bibliography ==
LaurenZside, Skovron, Kelley, Robinson, Bell, H.E. Caldwell, "Going Under" (ISBN 9798277706602)

== Awards and nominations ==
Year	Award	Category	Result	Ref(s).
2019	Shorty Awards	Best in Gaming	Nominated	
2020	Streamy Awards	Subject Award – Gaming	Nominated	

== See also ==
- List of YouTubers
