= Amanda Macias =

American journalist

- Born: c. 1990 (age c. 34); El Paso, Texas, United States
- Education: Missouri School of Journalism

Amanda Macias (born c. 1990) is an American writer and journalist who reports on business and politics for Fox News. She previously worked for the financial news network CNBC, where she covered national security and foreign policy.

== Early life and education ==
Amanda Macias was born at Fort Bliss, in El Paso, Texas. She grew up in a military family and has lived on U.S. Army installations around the world. She is a 2012 graduate of the University of Missouri School of Journalism with a degree in Broadcast Journalism and Finance. In 2020, she attended Columbia University as a Knight-Bagehot Fellowship Program.

== Career ==
In 2008, Macias worked as a general assignment news reporter and then anchor for NBC News affiliate KOMU-TV in Columbia, Missouri. She later joined Reuters as a field producer in Brussels, Belgium where she covered EU political institutions and NATO. In 2013, she moved to New York City and joined Business Insider as a national security reporter. In 2016, Macias moved to Washington, D.C., where she joined the national security team at CBS Radio.

In 2018, Macias joined financial news network CNBC as a national security reporter. In addition to national security, her beat includes the defense industry, State Department and the United Nations as well as the intelligence community.

In 2025, Macias moved to Fox News, where she covers "the intersection between business and politics", focusing on trade policy, labor markets, and inflation.

== Government investigation ==
Macias' source, a counterterrorism analyst, leaked classified intelligence reports to her and another journalist in 2018 and 2019 according to federal prosecutors. In court documents, the government referred to the two only as "Journalist 1" and "Journalist 2", although they were quickly identified in the press as Macias and Courtney Kube of MSNBC. MNBC and CNBC are sister networks at NBCUniversal. In 2020, the counterterrorism analyst, Henry Frese, who had been in a relationship with Macias, pled guilty sharing classified information with reporters about foreign weapon systems, admitting that he agreed to help Kube and Macias because he believed it would Macias' career. Frese was sentenced to 30 months in prison but was granted early release in 2022.

== Personal life ==
Macias lives in the historic Capitol Hill neighborhood in Washington, D.C. and speaks three languages. She is Hispanic.
