= Power Play: Tesla, Elon Musk, and the Bet of the Century =

2021 book by Tim Higgins

- Author: Tim Higgins
- Language: English
- Subject: Tesla, Inc., Elon Musk
- Genre: Non-fiction
- Publisher: Doubleday
- Publication date: February 11, 2021
- ISBN: 978-0-385-54545-7

Power Play: Tesla, Elon Musk, and the Bet of the Century is Tim Higgins's book about Tesla, Inc., published on February 11, 2021, that focuses on the company under the management of Elon Musk. The book does not contain any interviews with Musk himself, but many anonymous current and former executives from Tesla. In response to the book in general, Musk tweeted "Higgins managed to make his book both false and boring".

== Reception ==
The Minnesota Star Tribune wrote that it "has done an outstanding job [and] performed a deep dive into the nuts and volts of Tesla." The Los Angeles Times Tesla reporter Russ Mitchell reviewed the book and stated "I've covered Tesla as a reporter since 2016. When Higgins writes about facts and situations I'm familiar with, I can attest he's right on the button, every time. If there's any nonsense in Power Play, Higgins isn't the source of it."

The Publishers Weekly review remarked that "Higgins takes an in-depth and well-balanced look at the interplay between Musk's swashbuckling mindset of 'building the airplane as [he] was heading down the runway' and the hardheadedness of Tesla's veteran engineers and leaders, who understood the rigors of making cars that could kill people if they malfunctioned." NPR noted that "the book pays scant attention to Full Self-Driving Autopilot, the controversial self-driving software Musk has long promised is on the verge of perfection" but states that it "is hardly boring".

== Tim Cook conversation controversy ==
Following early coverage of the book, Elon Musk denied a featured anecdote where supposedly he and Tim Cook spoke about the possibility of Apple acquiring Tesla.
