= Ken Bensinger =

American journalist

Ken Bensinger is an American journalist. He won two Gerald Loeb awards, and a National Magazine Award in 2016. He was a finalist for a Pulitzer Prize.

== See also ==
- Red Card: How the U.S. Blew the Whistle on the World's Biggest Sports Scandal
