= Columbia Scholastic Press Association =

International student press association

- Abbreviation: CSPA
- Formation: 1925
- Headquarters: New York City, United States
- Director: Jennifer Bensko Ha
- Parent organization: Columbia University School of Professional Studies
- Website: cspa.columbia.edu

The Columbia Scholastic Press Association (CSPA) is a student journalism program of the School of Professional Studies at Columbia University, founded in 1925, whose goal is to unite student journalists and faculty advisers at schools and colleges through educational conferences, idea exchanges, textbooks, critiques, and award programs.

== Membership ==
CSPA memberships for student media are offered for print publications or online media, rather than for schools or chapters. The CSPA accepts newspapers, yearbooks, magazines, and online media edited and produced by students in middle schools, high schools, colleges, and universities for membership. Schools and colleges may be public, private, or faith-based institutions located in the United States, Canada, or overseas that follow an American educational plan.

Student publications must first become CSPA members to be eligible to enter contests and/or submit their publications for critique.

== Contests and critiques ==
"To make good writing the basis of successful student publications" was one of the earliest goals for the Columbia Scholastic Press Association. From its beginnings in 1925, the CSPA sponsored annual contests to seek out and publicize the best practices in student writing, editing, and publishing.

Student newspapers and magazines were the earliest formats chosen for these competitions. Student yearbooks were added in 1935. Online student media entries were added in 2002, as the technology of communications expanded from print into cyberspace.

The CSPA offers several contests and a critique service for student media. The contests, including the annual Crown Awards and the Gold Circle Awards, select the best from among many entries.

=== Crown Awards ===
The Crown Awards are the highest recognition given by the CSPA to a student print or digital medium for overall excellence. Both Gold Crown and Silver Crown Awards are given each year.

A panel of Crown Judges meets each year virtually to review all entrants, whether they are newspaper, magazines, yearbooks or online media. Judges are experienced former advisers to student media, professional journalists who understand student media or professionals such as photographers or online specialists with particular expertise needed for the judging exercise.

=== Gold Circle Awards ===
The Gold Circle Awards are offered to recognize superior work by student journalists usually as individuals but sometimes as an entire staff working with either print or online media. Gold Circle Awards recognize individual achievement by students from any CSPA member in four major categories: News; Magazine; Digital Media; and Yearbook.

=== Medalist Critiques ===
While the annual Medalist Critique is not a contest, it does provide one of several ratings to student media. The critique is a teaching tool to provide detailed guidance on how well a student print or online media is currently progressing, and how it could improve during the following year.

== Conventions and workshops ==
=== Spring Convention ===
This three-day national convention is held annually in mid-March, and open to student editors and faculty advisers to newspapers, yearbooks, magazines, video productions and online media from schools throughout the United States and Canada, as well as overseas schools following an American plan of education. Convention delegates can choose from separate seminars, lectures and workshops featuring professional journalists, award-winning advisers and leading student editors as presenters. Students will have swap shops for networking and exchanges. Face-to-face on-site critiques are available each day for interested staffs. The winners of the Crown Awards for top publications are presented at an Awards Convocation on Friday afternoon.

=== Summer Journalism Workshop ===
The annual workshop assists staffs in mapping out the upcoming academic year for their print newspaper and/or online staffs. The program offers newspaper and online publication courses for beginners and advanced students. The Workshop offers in-person sessions during the last full week of June for both live-in and commuter participants, and virtual sessions offered throughout July. While most in-person students reside on campus in air-conditioned Columbia dorms, commuter options are available for New York City and local residents.

=== Fall Conference ===
This annual one-day regional conference takes place on the first Monday in November and prepares student publication staffs, editors, and advisers for the new academic year, covering all aspects of student publishing. The conference is open to student editors and faculty advisers to student magazines, newspapers, yearbooks and online media.

== Awards to individuals ==
The Columbia Scholastic Press Association, and its affiliate for teachers, the Columbia Scholastic Press Advisers Association, offer awards to celebrate contributions by distinguished people in education, the media and public life. These awards are given in recognition of assistance and encouragement to student editors and faculty advisers working with them on student newspapers, magazines, yearbooks and online media in schools and colleges.

=== The Gold Key ===
- With the Gold Key, the CSPA recognizes educators and others for their support of excellence in teaching journalism and in advising the student press. The Gold Key also recognizes professionals in the media for significant contributions to student-practiced journalism. Gold Keys were first publicly presented by the CSPA in 1930.

=== The Joseph M. Murphy Award ===
- The Joseph M. Murphy Award is given by the CSPA for outstanding service to the Association over many years. Named for the CSPA's founding director, the Murphy Award is generally given only once per year.

=== The Charles R. O'Malley Award ===
- The Charles R. O'Malley Award for Excellence in Teaching is given by the Association for sustained achievement by a teacher of student editors or faculty advisers.

=== The James Frederick Paschal Award ===
- The Columbia Scholastic Press Advisers Association (CSPAA) created the James F. Paschal Award in 1986. Named for the late director of the Oklahoma Interscholastic Press Association and editor of The CSPAA Bulletin, this honor is given for meritorious service to a state scholastic press association by one of its officials.

=== The Edmund J. Sullivan Award ===
- The Edmund J. Sullivan Award is given by the CSPAA for student journalists who have fought for the right to speak their minds while in pursuit of the truth on behalf of their audiences. The award may be given to an individual or to a group of students.

== Advisers Association ==
Founded in 1927, the Columbia Scholastic Press Advisers Association (CSPAA) is a professional organization of teachers/advisers devoted to the development of the student press in accordance with educational practices.

Its purposes include: to function as an autonomous unit of the CSPA; to foster the interests and promote the professional status of advisers to student publications; to encourage sympathetic teamwork between faculty advisers (as the official representatives of their publications) and the school administrators and the community; to inaugurate and publish studies of problems relative to students' publications as well as pamphlets, bulletins and monographs for advisers.

Meetings are held annually at the Spring Convention (in March) and at the Fall Conference (in November).

== Directors of the Association ==
Col. Joseph M. Murphy - 1924-1969 (founding director)

Charles R. O'Malley - 1969-1981

Edmund J. Sullivan - 1981-2022 (as executive director from 2006)

Jennifer Bensko Ha - 2023-present
