= List of Gerald Loeb Award winners =

American journalism award

The Gerald Loeb Award is an annual journalism award, established in 1957 and administered by the UCLA Anderson School of Management since 1973.

- List of Audio, Video, and Video/Audio winners
- List of Breaking News winners
- List of Broadcast and Broadcast Enterprise winners
- List of Books, Business Books, and Special Book Award winners
- List of Columns, Commentary, and Editorials winners
- List of Deadline and/or Beat Writing, Deadline or Beat Writing, Deadline Writing, Beat Writing, and Beat Reporting winners
- List of Explanatory winners
- List of Feature winners
- List of Gerald Loeb Memorial Award winners
- List of Images, Graphics, Interactives, and Visuals winners
- List of International winners
- List of Investigative winners
- List of Large Newspapers winners
- List of Lifetime Award winners
- List of Local winners
- List of Magazines winners
- List of Minard Editor Award winners
- List of Newspaper winners
- List of News Service, Online, and Blogging winners
- List of Personal Finance and Personal Service winners
- List of Radio winners
- List of Small and Medium Newspapers winners
- List of Special Award winners
- List of Spot News winners
- List of Television winners
