= Gerald Loeb Award winners for Magazines =

American journalism award

The Gerald Loeb Award is given annually for multiple categories of business reporting. The "Magazine" category is one of the two original categories awarded in 1958 (the other being "Newspaper"), with the last award given in 2014. The category included articles published the prior year in national and regional periodicals until 2008, when it was expanded to include magazine supplements to newspapers. Previously, newspaper magazine supplements were entered into an appropriate newspaper category. The "Magazine" and "Large Newspaper" categories were replaced by the "Feature" category in 2015.

== Winners (1958–2014) ==
- 1958: "Cooperation of Businessmen and Municipal Government" by Werner Renberg, Business Week

He was awarded for his series on the maintenance and development of prosperous American cities through cooperation between municipal governments and businesses.

- 1959: Ernest Havemann, Life

Article:

"What's Happened to the Business Boom", January 6, 1958

- 1960: "Pricing Ourselves Out of the Market?" by John A. Conway, Newsweek
- 1961: Leonard S. Silk, Business Week

Article:

"The United States Invents a New Way to Grow", January 23, 1960

- 1962:
  - "The Incredible Electrical Conspiracy" by Richard Austin Smith, Fortune

Articles in series:
1. April 1961
2. May 1961

- Special Achievement: "History of American Business" by John Chamberlain, Fortune
- Special Achievement: "The Coming Bust in the Real Estate Boom" by Daniel M. Friedenberg, Harper's Magazine

- 1963:
  - "The Stock Market's wildest week – will the rally keep rolling?" by Sandford Brown, Newsweek
  - Special Achievement: Gilbert H. Clee, Harvard Business Review
  - Special Achievement: Robert W. Murray Jr., House & Home
- 1964:
  - John Brooks, The New Yorker

The article describes the May 28, 1962, stock market decline.

Article:

"The Fluctuation", August 31, 1963

- Special Achievement: John Maughan, Business Week

Article:

"The Negro Drive for More Jobs", August 17, 1963

- Special Achievement: Max Ways, Fortune

Article:

"Labor Unions Are Worth the Price", May 1963

- 1965: Lee Silberman, The Harvard Business Review

Article:

"Critical Examination of S.E.C. Proposals", November–December 1964

- 1966: "Technology and the Labor Market" by Charles E. Silberman, Fortune

Articles in Series:
1. "The Real News About Automation", January 1965
2. "The Comeback of the Blue Collar Worker", February 1965

- 1967: Max Ways, Fortune

Article:

"Antitrust in an Era of Radical Change", March 1966

- 1968: Michael Laurence, Playboy

Article:

"Playboy Plays the Commodities Market", August 1967

- 1969: "In Defense of Sterling" by John Brooks, The New Yorker

Articles in Series:
1. "Annals of Finance: In Defense of Sterling – I", March 23, 1968
2. "Annals of Finance: In Defense of Sterling – II", March 30, 1968

- 1970: John F. Lyons, Investment Banking and Corporate Financing

Article:

"Earnings: Can Anyone Believe the Numbers?", Autumn 1969

- 1971: Chris Welles, International Investor

Article:

"Is More Less? Is Faster Slower? Is Bigger Smaller", September 1970

- 1972: Kenneth Auchincloss, Newsweek

Article:

"Nixon's Frozen, Fleeting Dollar", August 30, 1971

- 1973: Everett Mattlin, Corporate Financing

He was awarded for an article on real estate in the November–December issue.

- 1974: Carol J. Loomis, Fortune

Article:

"How the Terrible Two Tier Market Came to Wall Street", July 1973

- 1975: Marshall Loeb, Time

Article:

"Faisal and Oil", January 6, 1975

- 1976: "Capital Crisis" by Gordon Williams, Business Week

"Capital Crisis" was a special issue of Business Week magazine examining the ability of U.S. businesses to generate $4.5 trillion in new capital to maintain economic growth over the subsequent 10 years at the existing rate.

- 1977: "Inflation Is Too Serious a Matter To Leave to the Economists" by David Warsh and Lawrence Minard, Forbes
- 1978: Lewis Lapham, Harper's

Article:

"The Energy Debacle", August 1977

- 1978: (Honorable Mention) William Tucker, Harper's

Article:

"Environmentalism and the Leisure Class", December 1977

- 1979: William Tucker, Harper's
- 1979: (Honorable Mention) Robert Heilbroner, The New Yorker
- 1980: "Demography's Good News for the Eighties" by Walter Guzzardi Jr., Fortune
- 1981: William Tucker, Harper's

Article:

"The Wreck of the Auto Industry", November 1980

- 1982: "An American Fortune" and "Silver Thursday" by L. J. Davis, Harper's

He was awarded for a two-part series on the Hunt brothers attempt to corner the world silver market.

Articles in Series:
1. "An American Fortune", April 1981
2. "Silver Thursday", May 1981

- 1983: Joseph Nocera, Texas Monthly

His story examines American business mergers.

Article:

"It's Time to Make a Deal", October 1982

- 1984: "Quarterly Reports" by Andrew Tobias, Playboy

He was awarded for a series on personal finance.

- 1985: "The Golden Boy" by Richard L. Stern, Forbes

The story is an exposé on Robert Brennan and First Jersey Securities.

- 1985: "Full Speed Ahead - Damn the Torpedoes" by Howard Rudnitsky and Allan Sloan, Forbes

They were awarded for an investigative piece on Financial Corporation of America.

- 1986: "The Crisis in Management: Where Do You Draw the Line?" by Barbara Donnelly, Institutional Investor
- 1987: "Trouble!" William C. Symonds and editorial team, Business Week
- 1988: "Hard Times" by Robert Heilbroner, The New Yorker
- 1989: Eric Schurenberg and Lani Luciano, Money

The story is an exposé on the American Association of Retired Persons.

Article:

"The Empire Called AARP", October 1, 1988

- 1989: Carol J. Loomis, Fortune

The story is about the investment firm Kohlberg Kravis Roberts & Co.

Article:

"Buyout Kings", July 4, 1988

- 1990: "The Litigation Scandal" by Peter Brimelow and Leslie Spencer, Forbes

This investigative piece describes how injury lawyers skirt ethical lines to collect $10–$20 million a year in contingency fees.

- 1991: "Series of Articles on the IRS" by Joseph S. Coyle, Frank Lalli, Denise Topolnicki, Elizabeth MacDonald, and Robert Wool, Money
- 1991: "The World of Business: Deal of the Year" by Connie Bruck, The New Yorker

The story is about the Time-Warner merger.

- 1992: "Series of Articles on the BCCI Scandal" by Jonathan Beaty and S. C. Gwynne, Time
- 1992: "Scientology: The Cult of Greed" by Richard Behar, Time
- 1993: "The Job Drought" by Brian O'Reilly, Fortune
- 1994: "Divided Dynasty" by Bryan Burrough, Vanity Fair

The story is about the Haft family business feud.

- 1995: "The Politics of Wind" by Phillip Longman, Florida Trend
- 1996: "Fatal Litigation" by Joseph Nocera, Fortune
- 1997: "Abuse of Power" by Mark Maremont and Jane Sasseen, Business Week
- 1998: "New Economy" by Michael Mandel and Dean Foust, Business Week

They were awarded for providing intuitive and on-target economic analysis.

- 1999: "Bull Marketing" by Shane Tritsch, Chicago
- 2000: "Cheap Car Parts Can Cost You a Bundle" by Jeff Blyskal, Consumer Reports

His article exposed and added valuable data on a major problem in the automotive industry that confuses consumers.

- 2001: "AOL's Rough Riders" by Gary Rivlin, The Industry Standard
- 2002: "The Numbers Game, Why Earnings Are Too Rosy" by David Henry and Nanette Byrnes, Business Week

Articles in Series:
1. "The Numbers Game", May 14, 2001
2. "Why Earnings Are Too Rosy", August 13, 2001
3. "Confused About Earnings?", November 26, 2001

- 2003: "Nationalities of Convenience" by Hal Lux, Institutional Investor

His article on offshore corporations led to follow-up reporting by others as well as proposed congressional legislation.

- 2004: "Is Your Job Next? / The Rise of India” by Aaron Bernstein, Pete Engardio, and Manjeet Kripalani, BusinessWeek

Articles in Series:
1. "Is Your Job Next?", February 3, 2003
2. "The Rise Of India", December 8, 2003

- 2005: "The Toll of a New Machine" by Charles Fishman, Fast Company
- 2005: "Why We're Losing the War on Cancer (and How to Win It)" by Clifton Leaf, Fortune
- 2006: "Why Carly's Big Bet Is Failing, How the HP Board KO'd Carly" by Carol Loomis, Fortune

Her story proves that the HP-Compaq merger was a bust.

- 2007: "How Many Lightbulbs Does It Take to Change the World? One." by Charles Fishman, Fast Company

His "beautiful and persuasive" story is about energy conservation and personal responsibility. It is a "wonderful example of explanatory journalism."

- 2008: "House of Junk" by Allan Sloan Fortune

His story about the subprime crisis stood out "in depth of reporting and quality of writing." He dissected a subprime mortgage deal to succinctly describe what happened and why. The story illustrated the conflicts of interested on Wall Street as firms sold subprime mortgages to investors while shorting similar investments.

- 2008: (Honorable Mention) "In Nature's Casino" by Michael Lewis, The New York Times Magazine

His story made the complex subject of catastrophe and insurance accessible and entertaining by focusing on a hedge fund manager's risk calculations designed to ensure the market absorbs the costs of large-scale disasters instead of the insurance industry alone.

- 2009: "Obamanomics" by David Leonhardt, The New York Times Magazine
- 2010: "How Bernie Did It" by James Bandler, Nicholas Varchaver, and Doris Burke, Fortune

The story explained the Ponzi scheme perpetrated by Bernie Madoff.

- 2011: "End-of-Life Warning at $618,616 Makes Me Wonder Was It Worth It." by Amanda Bennett and Charles R. Babcock, Bloomberg Businessweek

The story was about the death of Bennett's husband.

Articles in Series:
1. "End-of-Life Warning at $618,616 Makes Me Wonder Was It Worth It", March 4, 2010
2. "Chest Scan Costs $550 to $3,232 in Opaque Market for Radiology", March 4, 2010
3. "Avastin Dose Costing $6,600 became $27,360 in Hospital Billing", March 4, 2010

- 2012: "Inside Pfizer's Palace Coup" by Peter Elkind, Jennifer Reingold, and Doris Burke, Fortune
- 2013: "Cashier du Cinema" by Connie Bruck, The New Yorker
- 2013: "Why Things Fail" by Robert Capps, Wired
- 2014: "Stranded: An iPhone Tester Caught in Apple's Supply Chain" by Cam Simpson, Bloomberg Businessweek
