= Gerald Loeb Award winners for Large Newspapers =

American journalism award

The Gerald Loeb Award is given annually for multiple categories of business reporting. The "Newspaper" category was awarded in 1958–1973. It was split into two categories beginning in 1974: "Small Newspapers" and "Large Newspapers". A third category, "Medium Newspapers", was created in 1987. The small and medium newspaper awards were combined as "Medium & Small Newspapers" in 2009–2012, and "Small & Medium Newspapers" in 2013–2014. The last year newspaper categories were awarded was 2014.

== Gerald Loeb Award for Large Newspapers ==
- 1974: Paul Steiger, Los Angeles Times

Article:

"Use by Some Banks of Loan Loopholes Worries Regulators", December 3, 1973

- 1975: "Utility Rates: Too High or Too Low?" by Allan Sloan, Detroit Free Press
- 1976: Willard Randal and Stephen Solomon, Philadelphia Inquirer

Their special feature article documented the health hazards to workers of a chemical used at the Philadelphia plant of Rohn & Haas that led to 54 cancer deaths.

Article:

"54 Who Died", October 26, 1975

- 1977: "Commodity Options" by Susan Trausch and Larry Collins, The Boston Globe

Their series investigated firms in the commodity options business.

- 1978: "The Dollar: Its History and Current Woes" by Paul Steiger, Robert Rosenblatt, Ronald Soble, Murray Seeger and Sam Jameson, Los Angeles Times

Articles in Series:
1. "Ups, Downs of the Dollar: How, Why", November 20, 1977
2. "The Dollar: It's Rebuilt the World and Paid the Price", November 20, 1977
3. "Europe Still Believes U.S. Economy Basically Strong", November 20, 1977
4. "The Yen Is So Healthy It's Making Japan Sick", November 20, 1977
5. "A U.S. Trade Deficit Indefinitely", November 20, 1977
6. "Americans Asking How Good Is Gold?", November 20, 1977

- 1979: "A.T.&T., the Biggest Company on Earth" by N. R. Kleinfield, The New York Times
- 1979: Richard C. Longworth and Bill Neikirk, Chicago Tribune

Articles in Series:
1. "Trade Battle: As giants fight, little man suffers", April 2, 1978
2. "U.S. jobs vanish in flood of imports", April 3, 1978
3. "It's dog-eat-dog for profits and jobs", April 4, 1978
4. "Our bad-will envoy: the U. S. Dollar", April 5, 1978
5. "Japanese way: lifetime job, $30 rent", April 6, 1978
6. "Is the last boom over? U.S. most swim or sink", April 7, 1978

- 1980: "Coverage of U.S. Energy Crisis" by Gaylord Shaw, Tom Redburn, William C. Rempel, Cathleen Decker, William J. Eaton, Norman Kempster, Larry Pryor, Bill Stall and Penelope McMillan, Los Angeles Times

Articles in Series:
1. "The Great Gas Crunch – Who Is to Blame and Why?", May 20, 1979
2. "U.S. Oil Appetite: 5 years of Failure", June 24, 1979

- 1981: "Government Out of Control: Contracts" by Jonathan Neumann and Ted Gup, The Washington Post
- 1982: "Corporate Mergers" by Linda Grant and Karen Tumulty, Los Angeles Times

They were awarded for their "in-depth examination of the problems of corporate mergers."

- 1983: "102 Miles Up the River" by Robert Frump, The Philadelphia Inquirer

The four-part series described how technology and changing times removed the Port of Philadelphia from its position as the busiest on the North Atlantic coast.

Articles in Series:
1. "102 miles up the river", January 24, 1982
2. "Phila. ports adrift in currents of cargo revolution", January 25, 1982
3. "Confusion, disunity on the waterfront", January 26, 1982
4. "A no vote for a super port unit", January 27, 1982
5. "Ports of Phila. can survive by filling void left by others", January 27, 1982
6. "How other ports forged ahead", January 27, 1982
7. "The Phila. port loses the cocoa bean", January 27, 1982

- 1984: "High Tech: Leaving Home Series" by Dan Morgan, The Washington Post
- 1984: (Honorable Mention) "The King of Gems Series" by Ted Gup, The Washington Post
- 1985: "Monetary Zeal" by Paul Blustein, The Wall Street Journal

The story describes the Federal Reserve's five-year battle against inflation.

- 1985: (Honorable Mention) "Takeovers" by Jane Applegate, Patrick Boyle, James Flanigan, Linda Grant, Michael Hiltzik, John Lawrence, Paul Richter, Nancy Rivera and Debra Whitefield, Los Angeles Times
- 1986: "Power, Greed and Glory on Wall Street - the Fall of Lehman Brothers" by Ken Auletta, The New York Times
- 1987: "The Empire Crumbles" by Kimberly Greer, Newsday
- 1988: "Terrible Tuesday" by Daniel Hertzberg and James B. Stewart, The Wall Street Journal
- 1989: "The Great Tax Giveaway" by Donald L. Barlett and James B. Steele, The Philadelphia Inquirer

The article describes the revised federal tax code.

- 1990: "The Man from Wall Street: John Shad's Reign at the SEC" by David A. Vise and Steve Coll, The Washington Post
- 1991: "The Vendetta" by Bryan Burrough, The Wall Street Journal

He was awarded for the story of American Express' dealings with banker Edmond Safra."

- 1992: "Coverage of Massachusetts' Public Pension Scandal" by Gerard O'Neill, Dick Lehr, Bruce Mohl, Brian C. Mooney and Karen Douglass, The Boston Globe
- 1993: "Fire Power" by Alix M. Freedman, The Wall Street Journal

Their series examined how a Southern California family dominates the market for low-priced handguns used in crimes.

- 1994: "Investigative Series on Prudential Securities" Scot J. Paltrow, Los Angeles Times

His series describes how the Prudential Securities unit of Prudential Insurance falsely portrayed $8 billion worth of risky limited partnerships as safe for retirees.

- 1995: "Investigative Series on SAFE Investment Fund" by Joel Rutchick and Timothy Heider, Plain Dealer

His series exposed the questionable investments of public funds by the Cuyahoga County, Ohio, treasurer.

- 1996: "Series on Archer-Daniels-Midland Co." by Thomas M. Burton, Scott Kilman and Richard Gibson, The Wall Street Journal

Their series described the federal price fixing investigation of Archer-Daniels-Midland and the double life of an executive who became an FBI informant.

- 1997: "Test by Fire: The Story of Malden Mills" by Bruce D. Butterfield, Boston Globe

The four-part series "detailed the hardships faced by Malden Mills's owner, Aaron Feuerstein, his managers, and his employees as they battled to stay in business while building a new mill costing more than $400 million."

Articles in Series:
1. "What flames could not destroy", September 8, 1996
2. "Public acclaim, private pressure", September 9, 1996
3. "The bottom line: Base pay not enough", September 9, 1996
4. "Investigation focuses on flock", September 9, 1996
5. "On the road and selling hard", September 10, 1996
6. "Triumph carries a painful price", September 11, 1996
7. "A phone call that hasn't come", September 11, 1996

- 1998: "The Spin Desk" Michael Siconolfi, The Wall Street Journal

Siconolfi was awarded for "his page one article on the practice of 'spinning,' which revealed how investment banks allocate hot IPOs to the personal accounts of corporate executives in an apparent bid for business."

- 1999: "Prying Perks from the Poor" by Joel Rutchick, Cleveland Plain Dealer
- 2000: "Retirement Rip-Off"by Ellen E. Schultz, The Wall Street Journal

Her series on cash-balance pension plans made the difficult topic comprehensible to readers and led to worker activism and government scrutiny.

- 2001: "The Body Brokers" by William Heisel, Mark Katches and Ronald Campbell, The Orange County Register

They wrote "an exposé of the for-profit sale of body parts."

- 2002: "Uninformed Consent" by Duff Wilson and David Heath, The Seattle Times

Articles in Series:

March 11–14, 2001

1. "Patients never knew the full danger of trials they staked their lives on"
2. "During Protocol 126, The Hutch adopted a rule barring scientists from work in which they have financial stake."
3. "As the failures and deaths mounted, Protocol 126 was altered again and again, but new patients still weren't told the risks."
4. "He saw the tests as a violation of 'trusting, desperate human beings'"
5. "With a year or two to live, woman joined test in which she was misled — and died"
6. "Many patients think that joining testing will help them, but often they're mistaken"
7. "He helped create the biotech boom and when it went bust, so did he"
8. "No wonder they call the place 'Mother Hutch'"
9. "The Hutch zealously guards its secrets"
10. "System's serious flaws have led many to call for regulatory reform"

- 2003: "AOL's Advertising Deals" by Alec Klein, The Washington Post

His investigation into the accounting practices of AOL led to AOL having its accounting firm re-certify nine transactions before the Post published the stories. AOL subsequently revised its financial results for 2000–2002 and became the subject of two federal investigations.

Articles in Series:
1. "Unconventional Transactions Boosted Sales", July 18, 2002
2. "Creative Transactions Earned Team Rewards", July 19, 2002
3. "Unorthodox Partnership Produced Financial Gains", July 19, 2002
4. "AOL Time Warner Discloses SEC Probe", July 25, 2002
5. "Dealmaker At AOL to Shift Focus", July 30, 2002
6. "SEC Expands Probe of AOL", August 2, 2002
7. "AOL To Revise Financial Results", October 24, 2002

- 2004: "Big Green" by David B. Ottaway and Joe Stephens, The Washington Post

Articles in Series:
1. "Inside the Nature Conservancy", May 4, 2003
2. "A House in the Woods", May 6, 2003
3. "When Conservation and Business Fail to Mix", May 5, 2003

- 2005: "Death on the Tracks" by Walt Bogdanich, The New York Times

Articles in Series:
1. "In Seaths at Rail Crossings, Missing Evidence and Silence", July 11, 2004
2. "Other Cases and Other Questions", July 11, 2004
3. "A Crossing Crash Unreported And a Family Broken by Grief", July 12, 2004
4. "Railroad Safety Agency Says It Is Addressing Fatal Crashes", July 23, 2004
5. "Federal Inquiry to Review Regulation of Railroad Grade Crossings", September 2, 2004
6. "Amtrak Pays Millions for Others' Fatal Errors", October 15, 2004
7. "For Railroads and the Safety Overseer, Close Ties", November 7, 2004
8. "Safety Group Closely Echoes Rail Industry", November 14, 2004
9. "Regulators Plan to Step Up Union Pacific Safety Checks", November 17, 2004
10. "Unions Ask Agency to Oppose Union Pacific on Inspections", December 2, 2004
11. "Head of Railroad Administration, Facing Two Inquireies, Is Quitting in Two Weeks", December 18, 2004
12. "Questions Raised on Warnings at Rail Crossing", December 30, 2004

- 2006: "Borrower Beware" by Ann Hardie, Carrie Teegardin and Alan Judd, The Atlanta Journal-Constitution

Their series of stories exposed the egregiousness of Georgia's lending laws.

Articles in Series:
1. "Harsh lending laws fail consumers", January 30, 2005
2. "Swift foreclosures dash American dream", January 30, 2005
3. "Why Georgia can be a bad place to buy a car", October 23, 2005
4. "The cost is high and so is the risk of borrowers who post car titles as collateral for quick cash", January 31, 2005
5. "Lenders often pack small loans with insurance and other extras that spike costs for consumers", February 1, 2005
6. "Lenders win, lose in Gold Dome battles", February 1, 2005
7. "Auto deal gone sour?", October 24, 2005

- 2007: "The Secretive Backdating of Option Awards for Corporate Executives" by Charles Forelle, James Bandler, Mark Maremont and Steve Stecklow, The Wall Street Journal

Articles in Series:
1. "The Perfect Payday", 2006
2. "Open Spigot, Bosses' Pay: How Stock Options Became Part of the Problem", 2006
3. "Matter of Timing, Five More Companies Show Questionable Options Pattern", 2006
4. "Dating Game, Stock-Options Criminal Charge: Slush Fund and Fake Employees", 2006
5. " Executive Retreat, Stock-Options Scandal Fugitive Puts Roots Down in Namibia", 2006
6. " Bad Options, How a Giant Insurer Decided to Oust Hugely Successful CEO", 2006
7. "Executive Pay: The 9/11 Factor", 2006

- 2008: "Toxic Pipeline" by Walt Bogdanich, Jake Hooker, David Barboza and Andrew W. Lehren, The New York Times

"This investigative series included exhaustive reporting and colorful storytelling on an important topic — how dangerous and poisonous pharmaceutical ingredients from small factories in rural China have flowed into the global market. Reported on four continents, this comprehensive series presented a compelling analysis of the 'toxic pipeline' that has had a devastating, sometimes deadly, cost to humans."

- 2009: "The Reckoning" by Gretchen Morgenson, Peter S. Goodman, Charles Duhigg, Carter Dougherty, Eric Dash, Julie Creswell, Jo Becker, Sheryl Gay Stolberg and Stephen Labaton, The New York Times

Articles in Series:
1. "Behind Biggest Insurer's Crisis, A Blind Eye to a Web of Risk", September 28, 2008
2. "U.S. May Take Ownership Stake in Banks to Ease Credit Crisis", October 9, 2008
3. "From Midwest to M.T.A., Pain From Global Gamble", November 2, 2008
4. "Citigroup Pays for a Rush to Risk", November 23, 2008
5. "White House Philosophy Stoked Mortgage Bonfire", December 21, 2008

- 2010: "Food Safety" by Michael Moss and Andrew Martin, The New York Times
- 2011: "Deep Trouble" by Ben Casselman, Russell Gold, Douglas A. Blackmon, Vanessa O'Connell, Alexandra Berzon and Ana Campoy, The Wall Street Journal

Articles in Series:
1. "Unusual Decisions Set Stage for BP Disaster", May 27, 2010
2. "There Was 'Nobody in Charge'", May 28, 2010
3. "On Doomed Rig's Last Day, A Divisive Change of Plan", August 26, 2010

- 2012: "Wheels of Fortune" by Ken Bensinger, Los Angeles Times

Articles in Series:
1. "A vicious cycle in the used-car business", October 31, 2011
2. "Wall Street loves used cars", November 1, 2011
3. "Hard road for poor needing cars", November 3, 2011
4. "Used-car leases are a plus for dealers; drivers, not so much", December 30, 2011

- 2013: "Playing With Fire" by Patricia Callahan, Sam Roe and Michael Hawthorne, Chicago Tribune

Articles in Series:
1. "Playing with fire" May 6, 2002
2. "Labels provide little help when picking produxts", May 6, 2012
3. "Testing shows treated foam offers no real safety benefit", May 6, 2012
4. "Big Tobacco's clout", May 8, 2012
5. "Big Tobacco's playbook", May 8, 2012
6. "'Flat-out deceptive'", May 9, 2012
7. "How 8 TV fires spread around the world", May 9, 2012
8. "Toxic roulette", May 10, 2012
9. "A suspicious similarity", May 10, 2012
10. "Flawed research props up industry", December 30, 2012
11. "A new study, but fl awed again", December 30, 2012

- 2014: "Five of the NSA Stories" by Barton Gellman, Laura Poitras, Ellen Nakashima, Craig Timberg, Steven Rich, and Ashkan Soltani, The Washington Post

== See also ==
- Gerald Loeb Award winners for Newspaper
- Gerald Loeb Award winners for Small and Medium Newspapers
