= Gerald Loeb Award winners for Deadline and Beat Reporting =

American journalism award

The Gerald Loeb Award is given annually for multiple categories of business reporting. The category "Deadline and/or Beat Writing" was awarded in 1985–2000, "Beat Writing" in 2001, and "Deadline or Beat Writing" in 2002. Beginning in 2003, it was split into "Deadline Writing" (2003–2007) and "Beat Writing" (2003–2010). "Beat Writing" was replaced by "Beat Reporting" beginning in 2011.

== Gerald Loeb Award for Deadline and/or Beat Writing (1985–2000) ==
The Historical List of award winners maintained by the UCLA Anderson School of Management lists a 1984 award for "Deadline/Beat Reporting," but contemporary sources say it was for "Spot News."

- 1985: "The Battle for Gulf" by Robert J. Cole, The New York Times
- 1986: "Reversing Course" by Laura Landro, Wall Street Journal

The story describes Gulf and Western Industries's plans to sell its consumer and industrial products group to Wickes Cos.

- 1987: "Coverage of Wall Street Insider Trading Scandal" by Daniel Hertzberg and James B. Stewart, The Wall Street Journal
- 1988: "Coverage of Northrop and the MX Missile" by Ralph Vartabedian, Los Angeles Times
- 1989: "Coverage of RJR Nabisco Buyout" by John Helyar and Bryan Burrough, The Wall Street Journal
- 1989: (Honorable Mention) "Coverage of Texas Air Corp." by Thomas Petzinger Jr. and Paulette Thomas, The Wall Street Journal

Their coverage of Texas Air Corp. caused a federal investigation of the company's operating practices and finances.

- 1990: "Coverage of the Time-Warner Merger" by Kathryn Harris and Paul Richter, Los Angeles Times
- 1991: "Coverage of the Collapse of Donald Trump's Financial Empire" by Neil Barsky, The Wall Street Journal
- 1992: "Selection of Articles on the Federal Reserve's Decision-Making Process" by Alan Murray, The Wall Street Journal
- 1993: "Coverage of General Motors Corps" by Joseph B. White and Paul Ingrassia, The Wall Street Journal

They were awarded for their coverage of management turmoil within General Motors.

- 1994:"Coverage of the Paramount Takeover Battle" by Kathryn Harris, Los Angeles Times

Her stories chronicled Viacom's successful battle to take over Paramount Communications for $10 billion.

- 1995: "Coverage of the Collapse of Kidder Peabody" by Michael Siconolfi and Laura Jereski, The Wall Street Journal
- 1996: "Coverage of the Media Industry" by Geraldine Fabrikant, The New York Times
- 1997: "Coverage of the Economy" by Scott Thurm, San Jose Mercury News
- 1998: "Coverage of the Tobacco Industry" by Alix M. Freedman and Suein L. Hwang, The Wall Street Journal

They were awarded "for their breakthrough coverage of the tobacco industry's liability settlement."

- 1999: "Coverage of the Near Collapse of Long-Term Capital Management" by The New York Times Staff (including Diana B. Henriques), The New York Times
- 2000: "The Rise of Day Trading" by Ianthe Jeanne Dugan, The Washington Post
- 2000: (Honorable Mention) Lawrence Messina, Charleston Gazette

He was honored for his reporting on the government takeover of First National Bank of Keystone.

== Gerald Loeb Award for Deadline or Beat Writing (2002) ==
- 2002: "Enron: The Demise of a Giant" by Rebecca Smith and John Emshwiller, The Wall Street Journal

Their reporting on Enron put them in the role of watchdogs as the S.E.C.'s investigation followed their lead.

Articles in Series:
1. "Enron Jolt: Investments, Assets Generate Big Loss --- Part of Charge Tied To 2 Partnerships Interests Wall Street", October 17, 2001
2. "Enron CFO's Partnership Had Millions in Profit", October 19, 2001
3. "Enron Transaction Raises New Questions --- A Company Executive Ran Entity That Received $35 Million in March", November 5, 2001
4. "Trading Places: Fancy Finances Were Key to Enron's Success, And Now to Its Distress --- Impenetrable Deals Have Put Firm in Position Where It May Lose Independence --- Talks With Rival Dynegy", November 8, 2001
5. "Running on Empty: Enron Faces Collapse As Credit, Stock Dive And Dynegy Bolts --- Energy-Trading Giant's Fate Could Reshape Industry, Bring Tighter Regulation --- Price Quotes Suddenly Gone", November 29, 2001
6. "Shock Waves: Enron's Swoon Leaves A Grand Experiment In a State of Disarray --- Electricity Policy May Be Left To Lurch Between Poles Of Regulation, Free Rein --- Recession Is Powerful Factor", November 30, 2001
7. "Corporate Veil: Behind Enron's Fall, A Culture of Operating Outside Public's View --- Hidden Deals With Officers And Minimal Disclosure Finally Cost It Its Trust --- Chew coand JEDI Warriors", December 5, 2001

== Gerald Loeb Award for Deadline Writing (2003–2007) ==
- 2003: "WorldCom's Whirlwind Demise" by Rebecca Blumenstein, Gregory Zuckerman, Jared Sandberg, Shawn Young, Susan Pulliam, Deborah Solomon and Carrick Mollenkamp, The Wall Street Journal

Their stories covered the collapse of WorldCom, including breaking the news of the resignation of Bernard Ebbers as CEO, and providing in-depth analysis of the reported $3.8 billion accounting error.

Articles in Series:
1. "Telecom's Troubles Spread From Upstarts To Sector's Leaders", March 13, 2002
2. "Bernie Ebbers Bet the Ranch — Really — on WorldCom Stock", April 12, 2002
3. "WorldCom CEO Quits Amid Probe Of Firm's Finances", April 30, 2002
4. "WorldCom Admits $3.8 Billion Error In Its Accounting", June 26, 2002
5. "How Three Unlikely Sleuths Discovered Fraud at WorldCom", October 30, 2002
6. "Former WorldCom CEO Built An Empire on Mountain of Debt", December 31, 2002

- 2004: "The Day Grasso Quit as NYSE Chief" by Susanne Craig, Ianthe Jeanne Dugan, Theo Francis and Kate Kelly, The Wall Street Journal

Articles in Series:
1. "Grasso Quits NYSE Amid Pay Furor", September 18, 2003
2. "Tight-Knit Culture Will Help Shape Big Board's Future", September 18, 2003
3. "Weakened NYSE Must Face Challenges", September 18, 2003
4. "How Much Severance Pay Is Enough?", September 18, 2003

- 2005: "End of an Era" by Andrew Ross Sorkin, Steve Lohr, David Barboza, Gary Rivlin and John Markoff, The New York Times

Articles in Series:
1. "I.B.M. said to put its PC business on the market", December 3, 2004
2. "An Unknown Giant Flexes Its Muscles", December 4, 2004
3. "Contemplating a PC Market Without I.B.M.", December 4, 2004
4. "Sale of I.B.M. PC Unit Is a Bridge Between Companies and Cultures", December 8, 2004
5. "I.B.M. Sought a China Partnership, Not Just a Sale", December 13, 2004
6. "Taiwan Watches Its Economy Slip to China", December 13, 2004
7. "Outsourcing to the U.S.", December 25, 2004

- 2006: "Sale of MBNA" by Maureen Milford, Ted Griffith, Luladey B. Tadesse, Robin Brown, Gary Soulsman, Christopher Yasiejko, Michele Besso, Steven Church, Jeff Montgomery and Peter Bothum, The News Journal
- 2007: "The Implosion of a Highflying Hedge Fund" by Ann Davis, Henny Sender and Gregory Zuckerman, The Wall Street Journal

== Gerald Loeb Award for Beat Writing (2001, 2003–2010) ==
- 2001: "Juice Squeeze" by Rebecca Smith, The Wall Street Journal

Smith won for her energy coverage in 2000.

- 2003: "Inside the S.E.C." by Stephen Labaton, The New York Times

His stories documented the conflicts and missteps of S.E.C. chairman Harvey Pitt and the impact he had on the agency.

Articles in Series:
1. "Downturn and Shift in Population Feed Boom in White-Collar Crime", June 2, 2002
2. "Chief of S.E.C. Is Set to Pursue Former Clients", July 18, 2002
3. "S.E.C. Is Suffering From Nonbenign Neglect", July 20, 2002
4. "S.E.C. Chief Seeks Promotion; Chances Look Dom", July 24, 2002
5. "Bush Tries to Shrink S.E.C. Raise Intended for Corporate Cleanup", October 19, 2002
6. "Audit Overseer Cited Problems In Previous Post", October 31, 2002
7. "Praise to Scorn: Mercurial Ride Of S.E.C. Chief", November 10, 2002

- 2004:"A Spotlight on Boeing's Legal and Ethical Scandals" by J. Lynn Lunsford, Andy Pasztor and Anne Marie Squeo, The Wall Street Journal

Articles in Series:
1. "U. S. Probes Whether Boeing Misused a Rival's Documents", May 5, 2003
2. "Mergers Make It Tougher to Punish Federal Contractors", June 10, 2003
3. "Boeing Is Punished in Rocket Case", July 25, 2003
4. "Boeing's Plan to Smooth Bumps Of Jet Market Hits Turbulence", August 25, 2003
5. "Air Force Ex-Official Had Ties To Boeing During Contract Talks", October 7, 2003
6. "Boeing CEO Condit Resigns In Shake-Up at Aerospace Titan", December 2, 2003
7. "How Two Officials Got Caught By Pentagon's Revolving Door", December 18, 2003

- 2005: "The Short Life of 'Lifetime' Health-Care Benefits" by Ellen E. Schultz and Theo Francis, The Wall Street Journal
- 2006: "The Most Expensive Drugs and How They Came to Be" by Geeta Anand, The Wall Street Journal

Articles in Series:
1. "How Drugs for Rare Diseases Became Lifeline for Companies", September 15, 2005
2. "A Biotech Drug Extends a Life, But at What Price?", November 16, 2005
3. "Through Charities, Drug Makers Help People -- and Themselves", December 1, 2005
4. "As Biotech Drug Prices Surge, U.S. Is Hunting for a Solution", December 28, 2005

- 2007: "Radio Shack CEO's Resume in Question" by Heather Landy, Fort Worth Star-Telegram

Articles in Series:
1. "RadioShack CEO's résumé in question", February 14, 2006
2. "School trains students for careers in ministry", February 14, 2006
3. "Pastor can't verify CEO's account", February 15, 2006
4. "CEO admits 'misstatements'", February 16, 2006
5. "RadioShack CEO quits", February 21, 2006
6. "Ex-CEO leaving with a package", February 22, 2006

- 2008: "Breakdown at Bear Stearns" by Kate Kelly, Serena Ng, Susanne Craig and David Reilly, The Wall Street Journal
- 2008: (Honorable Mention) "Golden Opportunities" by Charles Duhigg, The New York Times

Articles in Series:
1. "Aged, Frail, and Denied Care by Their Insurers", March 26, 2007
2. "Bilking the Elderly, With a Corporate Assist", May 20, 2007
3. "At Many Homes, More Profit and Less Nursing", September 23, 2007

- 2009 (tie): "The Fall of Wachovia" by Rick Rothacker, The Charlotte Observer

Articles in Series:
1. "Complex Wachovia mortgage program worries some", March 30, 2008
2. "The swift fall of Ken Thompson", June 8, 2008
3. "The good deal the wasn't", December 21, 2008

- 2009 (tie): "Wall Street" by Gretchen Morgenson, The New York Times

Articles in Series:
1. "Arcane Market Is Next to Face Big Credit Test", February 17, 2008
2. "Borrowers And Bankers: A Great Divide", July 10, 2008
3. "Behind Biggest Insurer's Crisis, A Blind Eye to a Web of Risk", September 28, 2008
4. "The Silence of the Lenders", July 13, 2008
5. "How the Thundering Herd Faltered and Fell", November 9, 2008

- 2010: "The Toyota Recall" by Ralph Vartabedian and Ken Bensinger, Los Angeles Times

Articles in Series:
1. "Toyota's may not end at floor mats", October 18, 2009
2. "Runaway Toyota cases ignored", November 8, 2009
3. "Data point to Toyota's throttles", November 9, 2009

== Gerald Loeb Award for Beat Reporting (2011–2023) ==
- 2011: "Education Inc." by Daniel Golden, John Hechinger and John Lauerman, Bloomberg News

Articles in Series:
1. "Your Taxes Support For-Profits as They Buy Colleges", March 4, 2010
2. "Homeless Dropouts From High School Lured by For-Profit Colleges", April 30, 2010
3. "Veterans Failing Shows Hazards of For-Profit Schools", September 23, 2010
4. "Kaplan Quest for Profits at Taxpayer Expense Ensnares Veteran", November 1, 2010
5. "Executives Collect $2 Billion at For-Profit Colleges", November 10, 2010

- 2012: "Side Effects" by John Fauber, Milwaukee Journal Sentinel

Articles in Series:
1. "FDA orders review of jaw joint implants", February 8, 2011
2. "TMJ devices", February 8, 2011
3. "Researchers get royalties, papers omit sterility link", May 25, 2011
4. "Senate panel probes Medtronic", June 22, 2011
5. "Infuse cited in patients' painful bone overgrowth", June 28, 2011
6. "Experts repudiate Medtronic's research", June 29, 2011
7. "Madison surgeon's letter bashes critic", July 7, 2011
8. "Medtronics hires Yale group to review", August 4, 2011
9. "Doctors failed to note risk of cancer", October 23, 2011
10. "Bone agent linked to higher risk of cancer", November 4, 2011
11. "Doctors' letter to journal is silent on their payment", November 11, 2011
12. "Millions paid to UW chairman", December 27, 2011

- 2013: "Corporate Taxation Series" by Tom Bergin, Reuters

Articles in Series:
1. "Insight: Vodafone in new 1 billion pounds tax 'scandal'", June 26, 2012
2. "Starbucks slips the UK tax hook", October 15, 2012
3. "Fast food, tax lite", October 15, 2012
4. "Starbucks's continental de-tax cafe culture", November 1, 2012
5. "Insight – EBay's double tax base prompts calls for investigation", December 1, 2012
6. "Amazon's billion-dollar tax shield", December 6, 2012

- 2014: "Duke Energy and Nuclear Power in Florida" by Ivan Penn, Tampa Bay Times
- 2015: "Lobbying in America" by Eric Lipton, Ben Protess, Nicholas Confessore and Brooke Williams, The New York Times
- 2016: "Testing Theranos" by John Carreyrou, Michael Siconolfi and Christopher Weaver, The Wall Street Journal
- 2017: "Big Money, Unlikely Donors" by David Zahniser, Emily Alpert Reyes, Joe Fox, and Len De Groot, Los Angeles Times

Articles in Series:
1. "An Unlikely Donor Roll", October 30, 2016
2. Interactive Graphic, 2016
3. "A call for an inquiry into donors", October 31, 2016
4. "D.A. to review donation tied to developer", November 1, 2016
5. "Project proposed, donations flow", December 28, 2016

- 2018: "Automating Hate" by Julia Angwin, Je Larson, Ariana Tobin, Madeleine Varner, Noam Scheiber and Hannes Grassegger, Propublica
- 2019: "Age Discrimination" by Peter Gosselin, Ariana Tobin, and Ranjani Chakraborty, ProPublica and Vox

Articles in Series:
1. "Cutting 'Old Heads' at IBM", March 22, 2018
2. "How the Crowd Led Us to Investigate IBM", March 22, 2018
3. "How IBM Is Quietly Pushing Out Aging Workers", April 20, 2018
4. "Federal Watchdog Launches Investigation of Age Bias at IBM", May 17, 2018
5. "If You're Over 50, Chances Are the Decision to Leave a Job Won't be Yours", December 28, 2018

- 2020 (tie): "Boeing's 737 MAX Crisis" by Dominic Gates, Mike Baker, Steve Miletich, and Lewis Kamb, The Seattle Times

Article in series:
1. "Flawed analysis, failed oversight: How Boeing, FAA certified the suspect 737 MAX flight control system", March 21, 2019
2. "Engineers say Boeing pushed to limit safety testing in race to certify planes, including 737 MAX", May 5, 2019
3. "The inside story of MCAS: How Boeing's 737 MAX system gained power and lost safeguards", June 22, 2019
4. "Boeing rejected 737 MAX safety upgrades before fatal crashes, whistleblower says", October 2, 2019
5. "Boeing pushed FAA to relax 737 MAX certification requirements for crew alerts", October 2, 2019

- 2020 (tie): "How PG&E Burned California" by Katherine Blunt, Russell Gold, Rebecca Smith, Renée Rigdon, Yaryna Serkez, and Dave Cole, The Wall Street Journal
- 2021 (tie): "Essential Workers on the Front Lines" by Kimberly Kindy, Taylor Telford, Robert Klemko, Abha Bhattarai, Nicole Dungca, Jenn Abelson, and Meryl Kornfield, The Washington Post
- 2021 (tie): "Amazon's Abuses" by Dana Mattioli, Cara Lombardo, Patience Haggin, and Shane Shifflett, The Wall Street Journal
- 2022: "The Facebook Files" by Jeff Horwitz, Georgia Wells, Deepa Seetharaman, Keach Hagey, Justin Scheck, Newley Purnell, Sam Schechner, and Emily Glazer, The Wall Street Journal

Articles in series:
1. "Facebook Says Its Rules Apply to All. Company Documents Reveal a Secret Elite That's Exempt" by Jeff Horwitz, September 13, 2021
2. "Facebook Knows Instagram Is Toxic for Teen Girls, Company Documents Show" by Georgia Wells, Jeff Horwitz, and Deepa Seetharaman, September 14, 2021
3. "Facebook Tried to Make Its Platform a Healthier Place. It Got Angrier Instead." by Justin Scheck, Newley Purnell, and Jeff Horwitz, September 16, 2021
4. "Facebook Employees Flag Drug Cartels and Human Traffickers. The Company's Response Is Weak, Documents Show." by Lustin Scheck, Newley Purnell, and Jeff Horwitz, September 16, 2021
5. "How Facebook Hobbled Mark Zuckerberg's Bid to Get America Vaccinated" by Sam Schechner, Jeff Horwitz, and Emily Glazer, September 17, 2021
6. "Facebook's Effort to Attract Preteens Goes Beyond Instagram Kids, Documents Show" by Georgia Wells and Jeff Horwitz, September 28, 2021

- 2023: "Cracks in Crypto Empire" by Ian Allison, Tracy Wang, Nick Baker, Cheyenne Ligon, Sam Reynolds, Sam Kessler, Nikhilesh De, and Reilly Decker, CoinDesk

== See also ==
- Gerald Loeb Award winners for Spot News
