= Michael Mandel =

Michael Mandel may refer to:

- Michael Mandel (law professor) (1948–2013), Canadian law professor and author
- Mike Mandel (born 1950), American conceptual artist and photographer
- Michael Mandel (economist), economist and journalist

== See also ==
- J. Michael Mendel (1964–2019), American television producer
