= Rothacker =

Rothacker is a surname. Notable people with the surname include:

- Erich Rothacker (1888–1965), German philosopher
- Nate Rothacker (born 1981), American drummer
- Rick Rothacker (born 1972), American journalist
