= James Michaels =

American journalist and magazine editor

James Walker Michaels (June 17, 1921 – October 2, 2007) was an American journalist and magazine editor. Michaels served as the longtime editor of Forbes magazine from 1961 until his retirement in 1999.

== Early life ==
James Michaels was born in Buffalo, New York, on June 17, 1921. He attended the Culver Military Academy in Indiana and graduated from Harvard University with a bachelor's degree in economics in 1942. Michaels joined the U.S. military during World War II. He applied to the American Field Service in April 1943 and was sent to Bombay India to drive an ambulance for the British Army as part of AFS India Burma Unit 1. James was the nephew of the comedy writer Al Boasberg.

== Career ==
James Michaels stayed with the military until September 1944 when he was released to the Office of War Information. After the war, Michaels remained in India and worked for the United Press wire service's New Delhi office, giving him the biggest story of his life; in 1948 he broke the story of the assassination of Mahatma Gandhi. Michaels spent over four decades with Forbes magazine, after joining as a reporter in 1954 and rising to managing editor in 1957 where he served until 1961 when he became editor.

Michaels retired from Forbes magazine in 1999 and was succeeded as editor by William Baldwin. He left the magazine to help expand the Forbes Inc parent company into new mediums including television, books and new media. During his time as with Forbes, the magazine's circulation grew from 130,000 to 785,000.

== Editorial style ==
According to Allan Sloan of Fortune magazine, James Michaels, "was an absolutely brilliant editor who transformed business magazine journalism." Steve Forbes described James Michaels as a tough editor who wanted articles short, dramatic, and opinionated. According to The New York Times, when Michaels took over as editor, "American journalism remained a polite, dry affair, and corporate spin was reported without much skepticism. Ahead of his time, he made Forbes opinionated, interpretive and often indecorous, a magazine staunchly pro-business (and, its critics said, pro-wealthy) but did not hesitate to skewer companies and executives it saw as failures." According to Forbes, "he despised 'bad actors' who were cheating investors, customers, employees."

According to The New York Times many of his former writers and editors remember Michaels as much for his brutal assessments of their work as for his incisive teaching. While always a gentleman and available to talk, he could not stand verbose writing and would ruthlessly cut words and forced writers to state their view. A staunch contrarian, he did not let public opinion dictate the magazines views.

Michaels focused on the needs of his readers, rather than pleasing corporate executives or the mainstream media. Allan Sloan wrote, "Unlike many of his competitors, Michaels didn't particularly lionize corporate chieftains. His focus was on representing small investors' interests." Michaels wrote, "MY THESIS is this: If newspapers hope to survive they would do well to be less concerned with a liberal social agenda and more with the lives, hopes, and fears of their potential readers."

Michaels was a hater of weasel words. William Baldwin (current Forbes editor) wrote "Jim had a novel idea. Why not speak to the reader as if you were speaking to a friend on a street corner? Brevity helps. Judgments help. If the chairman of the company is a nincompoop, say so -- if there's evidence to prove it."

As editor, Michaels edited 1,000 issues, and he worked on almost every story. He wanted articles to be shorter, more direct, and with a clear conclusion to ensure they were fit for readers. He also wanted stories in Forbes to be original. If a story had been covered in another publication, he didn't want it in the magazine. To quote him, "Our readers look to us for groundbreaking, helpful stuff. Who needs us if we're doing what everyone else is doing?"

== Contributions ==
Michaels' writing on Gandhi's death is included in the anthology "A Treasury of Great Reporting". Michaels' dispatches from India are still taught in journalism anthologies of model reporting on deadline.

Steve Forbes credits Michaels with Forbes success. Forbes wrote, "When Jim joined FORBES in 1954, this magazine was, to put it charitably, second-tier. Moreover, business journalism itself was a backwater, a place where publications dumped their drunks and burned-out sportswriters. Today business, finance and economics are front-page stuff." "Jim made FORBES not only the most influential magazine in the business field but also one of the world's premier publications. Indeed, with no exaggeration, Jim Michaels was the foremost editor of our era. He virtually created modern business journalism."

In the 1950s Michaels foresaw the growth of the then nascent mutual fund industry. Michaels was integral in the development of Forbes' grading system of the long-term performance of funds. He helped create the Forbes 400 ranking of America's richest people, first published in 1982.

== Mentorship and influence ==
Michaels has been cited as mentoring and influencing an influential group of writers, journalists, and editors including Norman Pearlstine, Allan Sloan, Richard Behar, David Churbuck, Gretchen Morgenson, Kenneth Fisher, Peter Brimelow, William M Reddig Jr and Ed Finn.

== Awards ==
Michaels was honored with many awards, including a special Gerald Loeb Award (1972), Editor of the Year by Ad Week (1983), and the Greald Loeb Lifetime Achievement Award (1994). The TJFR Group honored Michaels by naming him one of the Top Ten Business News Luminaries of the Century.

== Death ==
James Michaels died at age 86 of pneumonia on October 2, 2007, in Manhattan. Michaels was a resident of Manhattan and Rhinebeck, New York, at the time of his death. Michaels was survived by his wife, Jean Briggs, whom he married June 29, 1985. Jean Briggs spent time as a senior editor and manager of the reporter/researcher department at Forbes. He was also survived by his brother (Albert), sister (Harriet), three children from a previous marriage, and six granddaughters.
