= Gerald Loeb Award winners for Feature =

American journalism award

The Gerald Loeb Award is given annually for multiple categories of business reporting. The "Feature Writing" category was awarded in 2008–2010 for articles with an emphasis on craft and style, including profiles and explanatory articles in both print and online media. The "Feature" category replaced the "Magazine" and "Large Newspaper" categories beginning in 2015, and were awarded for pieces showing exemplary craft and style in any medium that explain or enlighten business topics.

== Gerald Loeb Award winners for Feature Writing (2007–2010) ==
- 2007: "Rewriting the Social Contract" by Louis Uchitelle, The New York Times

Article in Series:
1. "At 150 Edgars Lane, Changing the Idea of Home", January 2, 2006
2. "Two Tiers, Slipping Into One", February 26, 2006
3. "Men Not Working, and Not Wanting Just Any Job", July 31, 2006
4. "Very Rich Are Leaving the Merely Rich Behind", November 27, 2006

- 2008: Charles Fishman, Fast Company

Article:

"Message in a Bottle", July 1, 2007

- 2009: Michael Lewis, Condé Nast Portfolio

Article:

"The End", December 8, 2008

- 2010: Michael Lewis, Vanity Fair

Article:

"Wall Street on the Tundra", April 2009

== Gerald Loeb Award winners for Feature (2015–present) ==
- 2015: "California Goes Nuts" by Tom Philpott and Matt Black, Mother Jones

Article:

"Invasion of the Hedge Fund Almonds", November/December 2014

- 2016: "The Unraveling of Tom Hayes" by David Enrich, The Wall Street Journal

Articles in Series:
1. "Rain Man in Trouble", September 13, 2015
2. "The Gambler", September 14, 2015
3. "The U-Turn", September 15, 2015
4. "The Waiting Game", September 16, 2015
5. "The Trial", September 17, 2015

- 2017: Matthew Campbell and Kit Chellel, Bloomberg Businessweek

Article:

"Hot Mess: How Goldman Lost Libya's Money", September 29, 2016

- 2018: "Stickin' with the Pig: A Tale of Loyalty and Loss" by Tony Bartelme, The Post and Courier

Articles in series:
1. "Stickin' with The Pig: A tale of loyalty and loss", June 22, 2017
2. "In the workers' words", June 22, 2017
3. "The rise and fall of Piggly Wiggly Carolina", June 22, 2017
4. "Employee ownership", June 22, 2017
5. "The lawsuit", June 22, 2017

- 2019: James B. Stewart, Rachel Abrams and Ellen Gabler, The New York Times

Article:

"'If Bobbie Talks, I'm Finished': How Les Moonves Tried to Silence an Accuser", November 28, 2018

- 2020: "Planet Fox" by Jonathan Mahler and Jim Rutenberg, The New York Times

Articles in series:
1. "Part 1: Imperial Reach", April 3, 2019
2. "Part 2: Internal Divisions", April 3, 2019
3. "Part 3: The New Fox Weapon", April 3, 2019

- 2021: "The Recession's Reach in Florida" by Greg Jaffe, The Washington Post

Article:

"A pandemic, a motel without power and a potentially terrifying glimpse of Orlando’s future", September 10, 2020

- 2022: "Revolt of the Delivery Workers" by Josh Dzieza, New York Magazine and The Verge

Article:

"Revolt of the delivery workers", September 13, 2021

- 2023: "The Crypto Trap: Inside the Bitcoin Bust That Took Down the Web's Biggest Child Abuse Site", by Andy Greenberg, Wired
