= Richard Longworth =

Richard Longworth may refer to:

- Richard Longworth (murderer) (1968–2005), American murderer
- Richard Longworth (academic) (died 1579), English churchman and academic
- Richard C. Longworth, American author and journalist
