= Ben Casselman =

American journalist

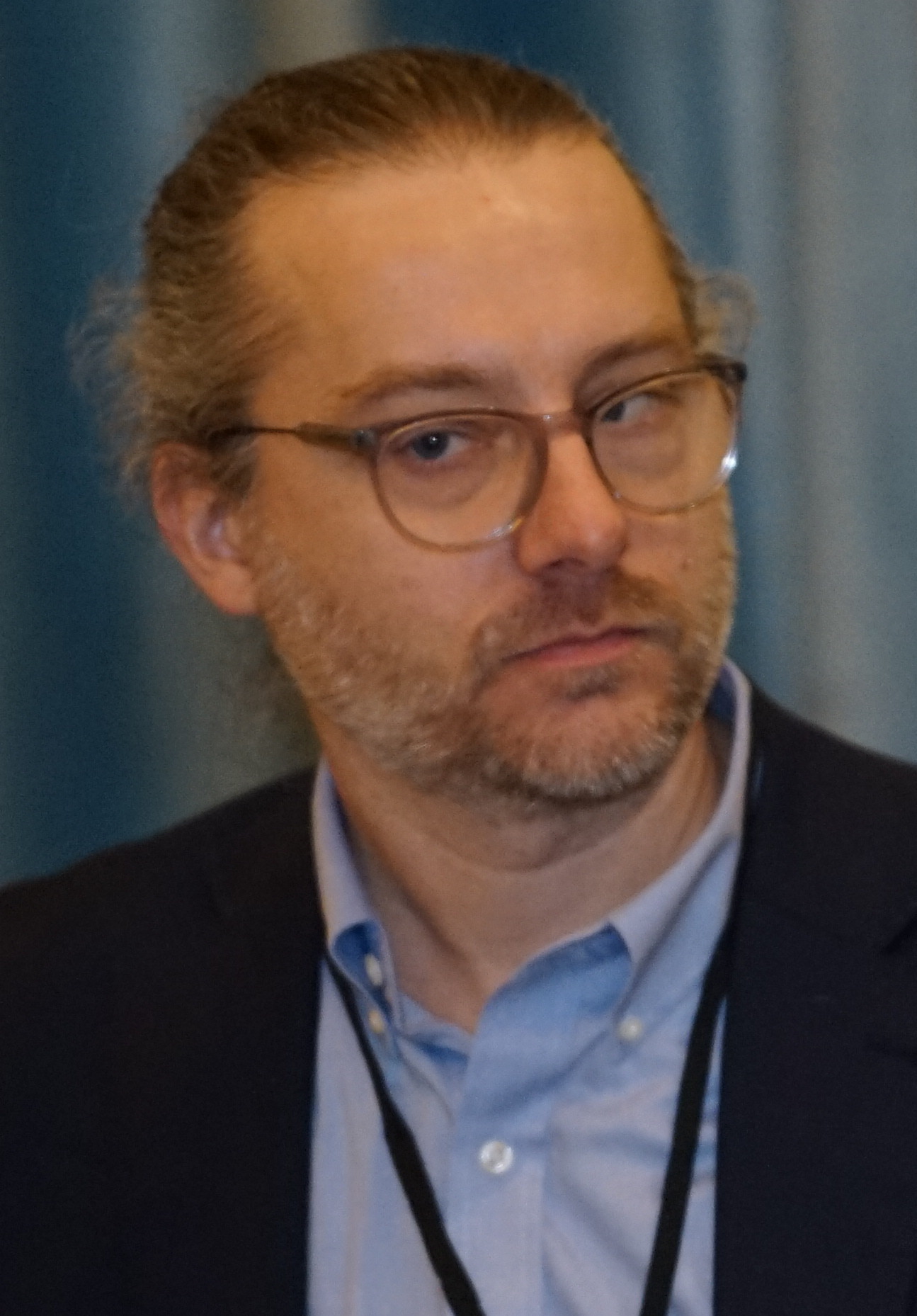
- Casselman at ASSA 2026
- Education: Columbia University (BA)
- Occupation: Journalist
- Organization: The New York Times
- Awards: Gerald Loeb Award for Large Newspapers (2011)

Ben Casselman is an American journalist. He previously worked for The Wall Street Journal, FiveThirtyEight, then joined The New York Times as an economics reporter in 2017. He was promoted to Chief Economics Correspondent in 2025.

== Biography ==
Casselman graduated from Columbia University in 2003. He started his journalism career at The Salem News before joining The Wall Street Journal, where he worked as a reporter from 2006 to 2013. He was a finalist for the 2011 Pulitzer Prize for National Reporting and shared a Gerald Loeb Award for Large Newspapers for covering the Deepwater Horizon oil spill.

In 2013, Casselman joined FiveThirtyEight as the chief economics writer and senior editor. He joined The New York Times business news desk in 2017. He was nominated for a Gerald Loeb Award for Beat Reporting in 2021 for his work on the COVID-19 pandemic's impact on the American economy. He is a frequent guest on The Daily, a news podcast of the New York Times.

He is an adjunct professor at the Craig Newmark Graduate School of Journalism at the City University of New York, where he teaches economic reporting.
