= Ellen Gabler =

American investigative reporter

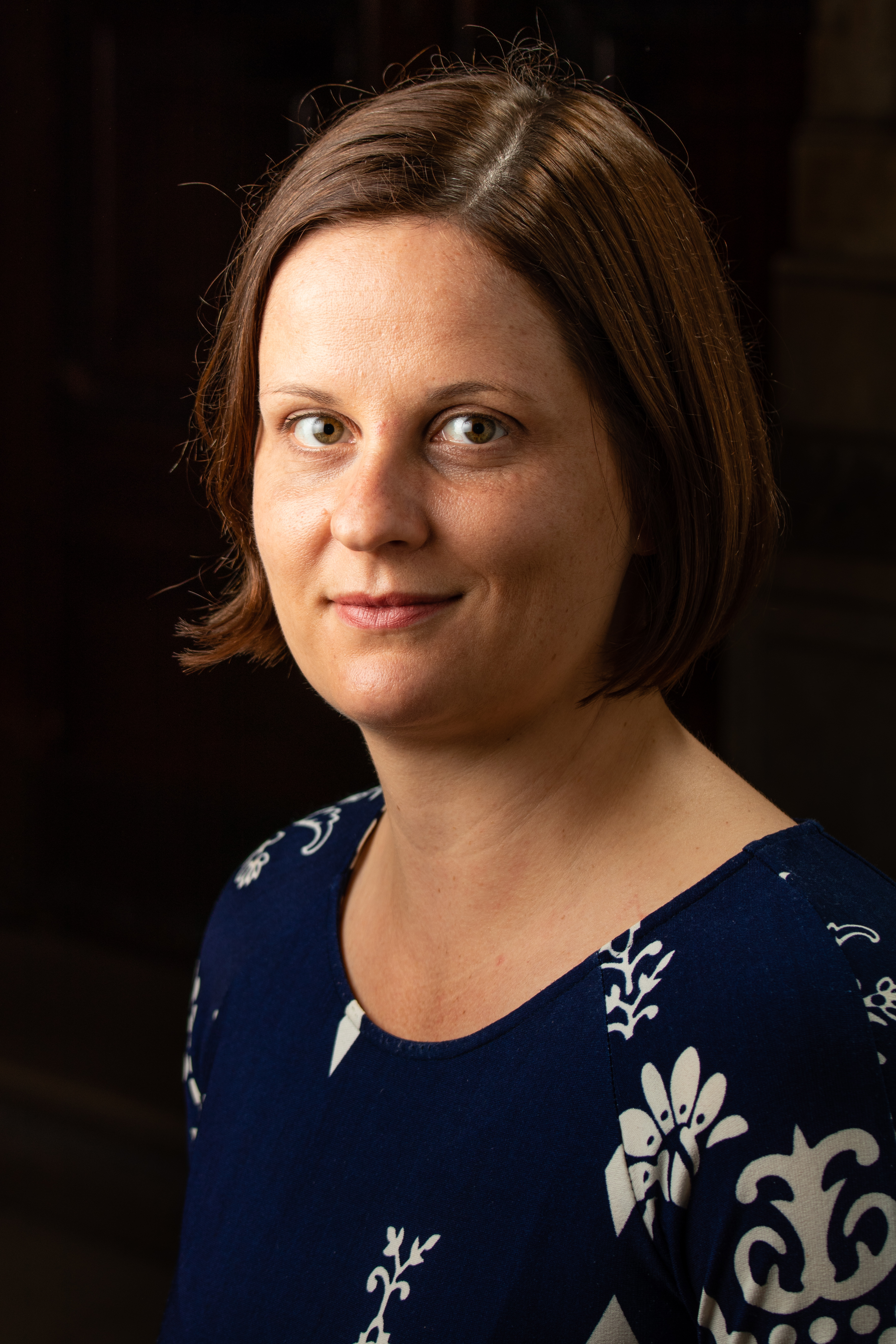
Ellen Gabler, May 30, 2018, at Pulitzer ceremony

Ellen Gabler is an investigative reporter for The New York Times and a member of a team awarded the 2018 Pulitzer Prize for Public Service.

== Early life and education ==
Gabler attended Memorial High School in her native Eau Claire, Wisconsin. In 2003 she graduated from Emory University with a degree in journalism and business. She was a swimmer throughout high school and college. She is a 2007 graduate of the Columbia School of Journalism and was awarded a New York Financial Writers of America scholarship.

== Career ==
Her first position as a reporter was with the Gazette in Stillwater, Minnesota, covering city affairs. Subsequent reporting positions included the Minneapolis/St. Paul Business Journal, Milwaukee Journal Sentinel and Chicago Tribune. She joined The New York Times in 2017.

In 2014 she was featured in an ABC 20/20 episode discussing a Waukesha, Wisconsin, murder case. She won the 2013 Livingston Award for Young Journalists in national reporting, as well as several other national honors, for identifying systemic errors in testing newborns, leading to preventable deaths and disabilities. This has led to reforms in newborn screening throughout the country. Many states have mandated changes in how tests are performed, and are working to identify problem hospitals. For this co-authored article Gabler spent five months fighting to review newborn screening data from all 50 states, and not all complied. The analysis of more the 3 million tests showed that there were life threatening problems with the first test given to nearly every baby born in the U.S. For her work on the investigative reporting uncovering misconduct and harassment by men across many industries, she won multiple awards with her New York Times co-workers. She was awarded the Pulitzer Prize for Public Service, the John M. Higgins Award for Best In-Depth Enterprise Reporting and the Robert F. Kennedy Journalism Award for domestic reporting. This series of articles set off workplace investigations, criminal investigations, and the Me Too movement. She received the 2019 feature article Gerald Loeb Award for the co-authored "'If Bobbie Talks, I'm finished': How Les Moonves Tried to Silence an Accuser." Although the complaints against Moonves were known at the time of the article, the Times reported that it was the cover-up, not the allegations, that led to Moonves' early exit from CBS. His words: "If Bobby talks, I'm finished," reverberated across news outlets. On May 30, 2019 The New York Times published a lengthy investigative, "gut wrenching" report by Gabler on the pediatric cardiac surgery program at the University of North Carolina Hospitals. She reported that some doctors suspected that patients with complex conditions were dying at a higher-than-expected rate, and discussed the ensuing controversy. Secret audio tapes were obtained; the doctors comments "offer a rare, unfiltered look inside a medical institution as physicians weighed ethical obligations to their patients while their bosses also worried about harming the surgical program," wrote Gabler. Two days later the North Carolina Secretary of Health announced there will be a thorough review into the events of 2016-2017. On June 17, 2019, North Carolina Children's Hospital announced the suspension of surgery for the most complex cases, some of which had a mortality approaching 50%. On January 31, 2020, Gabler reported chaotic workplaces in chain pharmacies, such as Walgreens and CVS. Pharmacies are frequently understaffed and overworked. Pharmacists are given many different tasks while "running to meet corporate performance metrics" that pharmacists characterized as unsafe and unreasonable, putting patients at risk. The article contains a "litany of horrible errors" in "gory detail."

Gabler is an adjunct professor at the Columbia School of Journalism, and was on the board of directors of Investigative Reporters and Editors.
