= Donna Rosato =

Donna Rosato (born 1966) is a journalist, reporter, magazine editor, and columnist from Greenwich, Connecticut. She is a senior writer at Money Magazine and regularly contributes at CNNMoney.com.

Donna wrote for The New York Times and SmartMoney and worked at USA Today for ten years covering various topics like stock market, tax returns and other financial markets. She appears frequently on CNN, CBS, MSNBC, CNBC and NPR. She also worked as a consultant on aviation and media projects at Booz Allen Hamilton. Rosato is a graduate of Northeastern University, Boston, Columbia University Graduate School of Journalism and holds an MBA from Columbia University's Business School.

== Awards ==
- 2016 Gerald Loeb Award for Personal Finance business journalism for "Aging's Costliest Challenge"
