= Zachary Mider =

American journalist

Zachary R. Mider has been a reporter for Bloomberg News since 2006. He writes features for the news service, for Bloomberg Businessweek, and for Bloomberg Markets magazines. He also worked for The Providence Journal in Rhode Island. In 2015, he was awarded the Pulitzer Prize for Explanatory Reporting "for a painstaking, clear and entertaining explanation of how so many U.S. corporations dodge taxes and why lawmakers and regulators have a hard time stopping them." In 2019, he received the Gerald Loeb Award for Explanatory for "Sign Here to Lose Everything".

Mider was born in upstate New York. He attended Deep Springs College and received a bachelor's degree in Social Studies from Harvard College. He lives in New Jersey with his wife and children.
