= James Glanz =

American journalist

- Status: Married
- Occupation: journalist
- Notable credit: The New York Times

James Glanz is an American journalist who was appointed as Baghdad bureau chief of The New York Times in 2007.

Glanz joined the Times in 1999. Articles he wrote with Eric Lipton and others on the World Trade Center were chosen as a finalist for a Pulitzer Prize in explanatory journalism in 2002. Articles Lipton and Glanz wrote were also a part of the Nation Challenged package that won a Pulitzer for Public Service in 2002. He received three Gerald Loeb Awards – the 2020 Breaking News award for "Crash in Ethiopia," and two consecutive Visual Storytelling awards, first in 2021 for "Visualizing the Pandemic Economy" and again in 2022 for "Why the Mexico City Metro Collapsed".

Glanz has a Ph.D. in astrophysical sciences from Princeton University.
