= Clifton Leaf =

American journalist

Editor-In-Chief of Fortune Magazine
- In office March 2017 – July 2021
- Preceded by: Alan Murray
- Succeeded by: Alyson Shontell

Personal details
- Education: Williams College
- Awards: Gerald Loeb Award (2005)

Clifton Leaf is an American journalist and was the editor-in-chief of Fortune magazine from March 2017 to July 2021. He graduated from Williams College.

== Awards ==
- 2005 Gerald Loeb Award for business journalism in Magazines
