= Jim Rutenberg =

American journalist (born 1969)

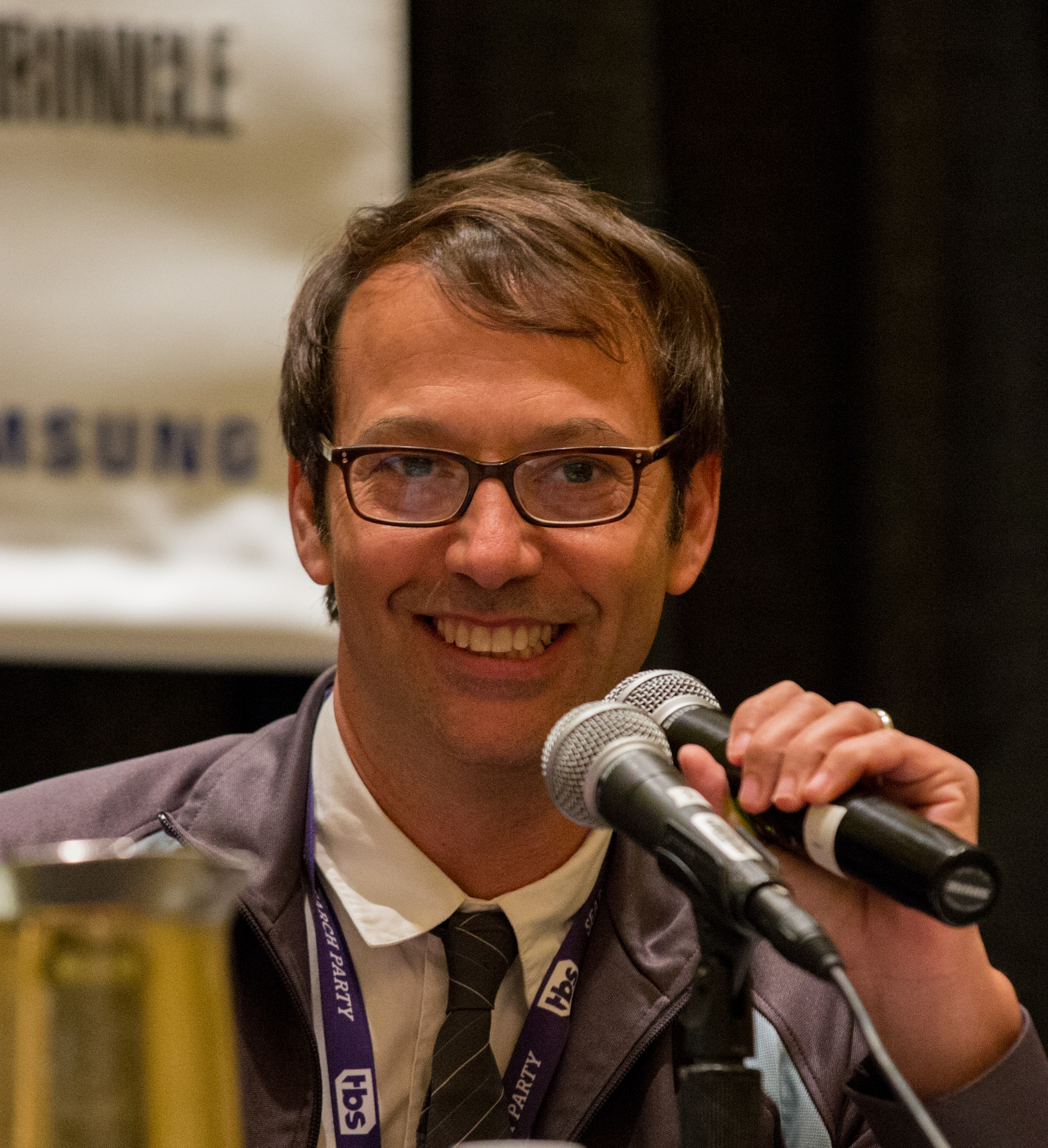
- Rutenberg in 2016
- Born: Philadelphia, Pennsylvania
- Occupation: Journalist
- Spouse: Ondine Karady

Jim Rutenberg is a writer at large for The New York Times and The New York Times Magazine. He has written over 2,300 articles for The New York Times. In 2018 he was one of the New York Times reporters who shared a Pulitzer Prize for reporting on the sexual harassment and abuse of women in Hollywood and other industries.

== Career ==
After finishing college in 1991, Rutenberg began working for the New York Daily News as a gossip stringer. He eventually worked his way up to becoming a general assignment reporter. In 1996, he was hired on staff and became a transit beat reporter. He left the Daily News in 1999 to work as a TV reporter for The New York Observer. One year later, he was hired by The New York Times, where he was responsible for covering media and local politics. He also served as City Hall Bureau Chief, and later as chief political correspondent for the Sunday magazine. In January 2016 he was named media columnist. In January 2020, he became a writer at large for The New York Times and The New York Times Magazine.

In 2018, Rutenberg was one of a dozen New York Times reporters who shared the Pulitzer Prize for Public Service for their investigation of sexual harassment of women in Hollywood and other industries. The two lead reporters on the story were Jodi Kantor and Megan Twohey. Rutenberg was among the group that investigated film producer Harvey Weinstein's decades-long abuse of women.

== Family ==
Rutenberg is married to designer Ondine Karady.

== Awards ==
- 2018: Pulitzer Prize for Public Service
- 2020: Gerald Loeb Award for best feature

== Selected bibliography ==
- Rutenberg, Jim (July 29, 2015). "A Dream Undone – Inside the 50-year campaign to roll back the Voting Rights Act". The New York Times Magazine.
- "Planet Fox" series, with Jonathan Mahler, in The New York Times Magazine:

1. "Part 1: Imperial Reach", April 3, 2019
2. "Part 2: Internal Divisions", April 3, 2019
3. "Part 3: The New Fox Weapon", April 3, 2019
