= Charles Forelle =

American journalist

Charles Forelle is an American journalist who works for CBS News. Previously he covered business for 23 years for The Wall Street Journal where in 2023 he was named Deputy Editor-in-Chief.

He graduated from Phillips Academy, and from Yale University in 2002 where he was managing editor of the Yale Daily News. He interned at The New York Observer and The Miami Herald. Forelle joined The Wall Street Journal in 2002. He worked in Boston, and then Brussels. He later worked in London for the Journal, where he became European Finance Editor. In 2018 he returned came to New York to become Finance Editor.

The work of Forelle and four other WSJ staff members earned The Wall Street Journal the 2007 Pulitzer Prize for Public Service. The award described the series as a "creative and comprehensive probe into backdated stock options for business executives that triggered investigations, the ouster of top officials and widespread change in corporate America". The lead articles in the series submitted for the prize were published March 18, 2006; Forelle wrote one ("How the Journal Analyzed Stock-Option Grants"); he and James Bandler wrote the other ("The Perfect Payday").

Forelle departed the Journal in October 2025, having been tapped by CBS News Editor in Chief Bari Weiss to serve as Deputy Editor.

== Awards ==
- 2007 Michael Kelly Award finalist
- 2007 Pulitzer Prize for Public Service, The Wall Street Journal
- 2007 Gerald Loeb Award for Large Newspapers
- Philip Meyer Award for Precision Journalism
- 2006 George Polk Award for business reporting
- National Headliner Award for business news coverage
- Gilbert and Ursula Farfel Prize for Investigative Journalism
- Goldsmith Prize for Investigative Reporting
- SABEW (Society of American Business Editors and Writers)
- Business Journalist of the Year.
- The Bob Consdidine award (Overseas Press Club of America) for Best newspaper or news service interpretation of international affairs
