= Ianthe Jeanne Dugan =

American journalist

- Occupation: Journalist

Ianthe Jeanne Dugan is an American journalist. She was an investigative reporter for The Wall Street Journal for 18 years. She earned the Gerald Loeb Award in 2000 for Deadline and/or Beat Writing for her article "The Rise of Day Trading," and again in 2004 for Deadline Writing, with Susanne Craig and Theo Francis, for their story "The Day Grasso Quit as NYSE Chief."

Dugan was a Pulitzer Prize finalist with a team for international reporting in 2017 for coverage of Turkey. In 2018, she won a Society of American Business Editors and Writers award for coverage of self-driving cars. She was the Wall Street reporter for The Washington Post and worked at Newsday and Business Week. Dugan was lead researcher for the movie American Made.
