= Peter S. Goodman =

American economics journalist and author

Peter S. Goodman is an American economics journalist and author. He won the 2009 Gerald Loeb Award for Large Newspapers, and the 2014 Gerald Loeb Award for Commentary.

Goodman has worked for The Washington Post and The Huffington Post, was the editor of the International Business Times, and is currently the International economics correspondent for The New York Times.

== Biography ==
Goodman graduated from Reed College in 1989. His newspaper career started in Kyoto writing for the Japan Times before he became a freelancing Southeast Asia correspondent for a number of newspapers, including the Los Angeles Times, Dallas Morning News, Miami Herald and London's Daily Telegraph. He returned to the US in 1993 writing for the Anchorage Daily News covering, among others, early on the career of Sarah Palin. After getting a master's degree in Asian studies at the University of California, Berkeley he came to The Washington Post in 1999. As the Post's economic correspondent, he undertook extensive travels to Southeast Asia, Middle East, Africa, Australia, and Europe. In 2007, he joined The New York Times as a national correspondent and wrote about the 2008 financial crisis. A major contribution, The Reckoning, was a finalist for the Pulitzer Prize and received a Gerald Loeb Award.

In his book Past Due, Goodman analyzes the lot of the U.S. worker who finds that his/her financial situation has not been improved over the last 15 years, namely “(b)y the fall of 2008, most American workers were bringing home roughly the same weekly wages they had earned in 1983, after accounting for inflation." It was selected as an Editor's Choice title by the New York Times Book Review and as one of Bloomberg's Top 50 Business Books.

His move from a respected position at a major traditional newspaper to the web-based The Huffington Post was noted. Howard Kurtz wrote that Goodman indicated that at The New York Times he found himself engaged in "almost a process of laundering my own views, through the tried-and-true technique of ringing someone at some think tank to say what you want to tell the reader."

== Books ==
- Goodman, Peter S. (2009-09-15). Past Due. Macmillan. ISBN 978-1-4299-1876-3.
- Goodman, Peter S. (2023-01-10). Davos Man. New York, NY: Mariner Books. ISBN 978-0-06-307831-4.
- Goodman, Peter S. (2024-06-11). How the World Ran Out of Everything. Mariner Books. ISBN 978-0-06-325792-4.
