= Gerald Loeb Award winners for News Service, Online, and Blogging =

American journalism award

The Gerald Loeb Award is given annually for multiple categories of business reporting: "News or Wire Service" in 2002, "News Services Online Content" in 2003–2007, "News Services" in 2008–2014, "Online" in 2008–2009 and 2013–2014, "Online Commentary and Blogging" in 2010, "Online Enterprise" in 2011–2012, and "Blogging" in 2011–2012.

== Gerald Loeb Award winners for News or Wire Service (2002) ==
- 2002: "Muddy Markets: How Companies Mislead and Manipulate Their Shareholders with Inadequate and Selective Deisclosure" by Jonathan Berr, Adam Levy, Peter Robison, Russell Hubbard and Neil Roland, Bloomberg News

Articles in Series:
1. "Raytheon Briefed Analysts Without Telling the Public", March 9, 2001
2. "Raytheon SEC Probe May Test New Disclosure Rules, Analysts Say", March 14, 2001
3. "Enron CEO Skilling Takes Company in New Directions", May 1, 2001
4. "U.S. Earnings Reports Miss Point — How Much Did Company Earn?", August 3, 2001
5. "Enron Investors Say Lay Must Deliver on Earnings Transparency", October 15, 2001
6. "SEC to Charge Company With Misleading `Pro Formas'", December 18, 2001
7. "SEC to File First Fair Disclosure Case, Pitt Says", December 24, 2001

== Gerald Loeb Award winners for News Services Online Content (2003–2007) ==
- 2003: "SuperModels" by Jon D. Markman, CNBC on MSN Money

His columns used understandable language to break down complicated topics, including goodwill and stock valuations. His writing showed confidence and a clear grasp of his subject.

- 2004: "The Flimflam Man" by Adrian Cox, David Evans and Abhay Singh, Bloomberg News
- 2004: "Risky Rx" by Chris Adams and Alison Young, Knight Ridder Washington Bureau
- 2005: "Exposing Small-Cap Fraud" by Carol S. Remond, Dow Jones Newswires
- 2006: "LAX Loans" by Frank Bass, Dirk Lammers and Larry Margasak, The Associated Press

Articles in Series:
1. "Sept. 11 recovery money went to small business unaffected by the disaster", September 8, 2005
2. "Congress to investigate Sept. 11 loan program", September 9, 2005
3. "Feds praise their Sept. 11 relief loan program but omit critical audit", September 13, 2005
4. "Small Business Administration ignores criticism of post-Sept. 11 loans", September 14, 2005
5. "Inspector general confirms that Sept. 11 loan recipients weren't hurt by attacks", December 28, 2015

- 2007: "Who Are the Short Sellers?" by Alistair Barr, MarketWatch

Articles in Series:
1. "Who are the short sellers?", June 13, 2006
2. "Short sellers: The good, the bad and the ugly", June 13, 2006
3. "'Naked' short selling is center of looming legal battle", June 14, 2006
4. "Short sellers: A rarer breed of investing", June 14, 2006

== Gerald Loeb Award winners for News Services (2008–2014) ==
- 2008: "Wall Street's Faustian Bargain" by Mark Pittman, Bob Ivry and Kathleen M. Howley, Bloomberg News

Articles in Series:
1. "Subprime Securities Market Began as 'Group of 5' Over Chinese", December 17, 2007
2. "'Deal With Devil' Funded Carrera Crash Before Bust", December 18, 2007
3. "Bass Shorted Subprime to 'God, I Hope You're Wrong' Wall Street", December 19, 2007
4. "Rating Subprime Investment Grade Made 'Joke' of Credit Experts", December 20, 2007
5. "Savannah Cries About a Bicycle Left Behind in Reset of Subprime", December 21, 2007

- 2009: "Broken Promises" by William Selway and Martin Z. Braun, Bloomberg News
- 2010: "Goldman, Moody's and the Collapse of the American Economy" by Greg Gordon, Kevin G. Hall and Chris Adams, McClatchy Newspapers

Articles in Series:
1. "Insiders claim Moody's sold out investors", October 18, 2009
2. "They bet on a meltdown, and won", November 1, 2009
3. "SEC has let some Wall Street firms off the hook", December 9, 2009

- 2011: "Profiting from Fallen Soldiers" by David Evans, Bloomberg News

Articles in Series:
1. "Fallen Soldier's Families Denied Cash Payout as Insurers Profit", July 28, 2010
2. "Veterans Agency Made Secret Deal With Prudential", September 14, 2010
3. "Prudential Profits From Slain Soldiers With Help From Taxpayers", September 30, 2010

- 2012: "Shell Games" by Brian Grow, Kelly Carr, Laurence Fletcher, Nanette Byrnes, Matthew Bigg, Joshua Schneyer, Cynthia Johnston and Sara Ledwith, Reuters

Articles in Archive:
1. "A little house of secrets on the Great Plains", June 28, 2011
2. "America's Havens of Anonymity", June 2011
3. "Hub of Secrets: Wyoming", June 2011
4. "A nested network?", June 2011
5. "How two shell companies duped the Pentagon", June 28, 2011
6. "The bonds that turned to dust", August 15, 2011
7. "A Global Web", August 2011
8. "The mysterious charity behind Micalizzi's bonds", August 2011
9. "A modern day Monaco", August 2011
10. "Inside 'Secrecy Jurisdictions'", August 2011
11. "A Cautious Crackdown", September 8, 2011
12. "Nevada's big bet on secrecy", September 26, 2011
13. "Consultants with troubled pasts", September 2011
14. "Video: The businesses is booming in the Silver State", September 2011
15. "Interview: Sec. of State Ross Miller: Nevada is no "safe haven", September 26, 2011
16. "Mediscam: How criminals easily form fake companies to swindle millions from Medicare", December 2011
17. "States resist efforts", December 21, 2011
18. "Cracking Shells", December 2011
19. "A fraud within a fraud", December 21, 2011
20. "The energy baron's secret", December 28, 2011
21. "Peeling back the corporate veil", December 2011

- 2013: "Inside Chesapeake Energy" by Brian Grow, Anna Driver, Joshua Schneyer, Janet Roberts, Jeanine Prezioso, David Sheppard and John Shiffman, Reuters

Articles in Series:
1. "The energy billionaire's shrouded loans", April 18, 2012
2. "A lucrative deal for the CEO's financier", April 18, 2012
3. "The CEO's secret hedge fund", May 2, 1012
4. "The lavish leveraged life of Aubrey McClendon", June 7, 2012
5. "Energy rivals plotted to suppress land prices", June 25, 2012
6. "It's time to 'smoke a peace pipe'", June 25, 2012
7. Casualties of a 'land grab'", October 2, 2012
8. "Anatomy of Chesapeake's land grab", October 2, 2012
9. "For sale: 'worthless' acreage", October 2, 2012
10. "Video", October 2, 2012

- 2014: "Rigging the World's Biggest Market" by Liam Vaughan, Gavin Finch, Bob Ivry, and Ambereen Choudhury, Bloomberg News

== Gerald Loeb Award winners for Online (2008–2009, 2013–2014) ==
- 2008: "Keeping Up With The Wangs" by Art Lenehan, Anh Ly and Suzanne McGee, MSN Money
- 2009: "Middle Class Crunch" by Art Lenehan, Peggy Collins, Aaron Whallon, Anh Ly, Elizabeth Daza, Joe Farro, Sean Enzwiler, Rachel Elson, Mark Baumgartner, Lauren Barack, Richard Conniff and Judi Hasson, MSN Money
- 2013: "Ghost Factories" by Alison Young and Peter Eisler, USA Today

Articles in Series:
1. "Long-gone lead factories leave poisons in nearby yards", April 19, 2012
2. "Lead in the soil", April 19, 2012
3. "How lead factories can pollute", April 19, 2012
4. "Interactive", April 19–20, 2012
  1. "Card 1"
  2. "Card 2"
  3. "Card 3"
  4. "Card 4"
  5. "Card 5"
  6. "Card 6"
  7. "Card 6b"
  8. "Site 57: John T. Lewis/National Lead/Anzon"
  9. "Site 100: Loewenthal Metals, Chicago"
  10. "Site 150: Kansas City Smelting & Refining (Eagle-Picher)"
  11. "Site 20: Columbia Smelting (NYC/baseball diamond)"
  12. "Video: Danger: Invisible & Ignored"
  13. "Video: Failure to Protect the Public"
  14. "Video: Soil Testing: USA TODAY’s Findings"
  15. "Video: Case Study: Tyroler Metals, Cleveland"
  16. "Video: How USA TODAY Tested Soil"
  17. "Video: About Sanborn Maps"
  18. "Video: Philadelphia: John T. Lewis/National Lead"
  19. "Video: West Allis, WI: Allied Smelting"
  20. "Video: Chicago: Loewenthal Metals Corp."
  21. "Video: Portland, ORE: Multnomah Metal Co. Works"
  22. "Video: Carteret, NJ: U.S. Metals Refining Co."
  23. "Video: Philadelphia: White Brothers Smelting Co. and Thos. F. Lukens Metal"
  24. "Video: Minneapolis: Northwestern Smelting & Refining"
  25. "Video: EPA, state respond to lead smelter sites in New Jersey"
  26. "Video: Who is responsible for cleanups?"
  27. "About this project"
  28. "Soil Testing Methodology"
5. "Some neighborhoods dangerously contaminated by lead fallout", April 20, 2012
6. "Lead in the body", April 20, 2012
7. "Contaminated soil", April 20, 2012
8. "Video: Ghost Factories: USA TODAY's soil testing findings", April 20, 2012
9. "What blood tests show", April 20, 2012
10. "Long-gone lead factories leave poisons in nearby yards", April 25, 2012
11. "Video: Ghost Factories: Invisible and ignored danger", April 25, 2012
12. "How lead factories can pollute soil", April 25, 2012
13. "Lead: The danger", April 25, 2012
14. "Lead in the soil", April 25, 2012
15. "Old lead factories may stick taxpayers with cleanup costs", December 19, 2012

- 2014: "Planet Money Makes A T-Shirt" by Kainaz Amaria, Alex Blumberg, Brian Boyer, Jacob Goldstein, Wes Lindamood, and Joshua Davis, NPR

== Gerald Loeb Award winners for Online Commentary and Blogging (2010) ==
- 2010: "Pogue's Posts" by David Pogue, The New York Times

Articles in Series:
1. "Some E-Books Are More Equal Than Others", July 17, 2009
2. "'Take Back the Beep' Campaign", July 30, 2009
3. "Verizon: How Much Do You Charge Now?", November 12, 2009

== Gerald Loeb Award winners for Online Enterprise (2011–2012) ==
- 2011: "What They Know" by Julia Angwin, Emily Steel, Scott Thurm, Christina Tsuei, Paul Antonson, Jill Kirschenbaum, Jovi Juan, Andrew Garcia Phillips, Sarah Slobin, Susan McGregor, Tom McGinty and Jennifer Valentino-DeVries, The Wall Street Journal

Pieces Submitted:
1. "The Web's New Gold Mine: Your Secrets", July 30, 2010
2. "What They Know", July 30, 2010
3. "A Short Guide to Cookies", July 30, 2010

- 2012: "Jet Tracker" by Mark Maremont, Tom McGinty, Jon Keegan, Palani Kumanan, Sarah Slobin and Neil King Jr., The Wall Street Journal

Articles in Series:
1. "Corporate Jet Set: Leisure vs. Business", June 16, 2011
2. "Perry Used Jet of Donor Who Faces SEC Probe", September 3, 2011
3. "Ready for Departure: M&A Airlines", June 17, 2011

== Gerald Loeb Award winners for Blogging (2011–2012) ==
- 2011: "Liveblogging Yahoo Earnings Calls in 2010 (They're Funny!)" by Kara Swisher, All Things Digital

Articles in Series:
1. "Liveblogging the Yahoo Fourth-Quarter Earnings Call:Can You Say “Sequential”? (Also Homepage HoverOut!)", January 26, 2010
2. "Liveblogging Yahoo’s First-Quarter Earnings Call:Yahoo Paints by the Numbers!", April 20, 2010
3. "Liveblogging Yahoo’s Second-Quarter Earnings Call:How Do You Solve a Problem Like Flat Revenue?", July 20, 2010
4. "Liveblogging Yahoo’s 3Q Earnings: Busy, Busy, Busy(So Go Away, Tim Armstrong!)", October 19, 2010

- 2012: "Felix Salmon's Blog" Felix Salmon, Reuters

Articles in Series:
1. "The horrifying AAA debt-issuance chart", July 15, 2011
2. "The global crisis of institutional legitimacy", August 22, 2011
3. "Don't ignore Tim Cook's sexuality", August 25, 2011
4. "The future of online advertising", November 14, 2011
