= Gerald Loeb Special Award winners =

American journalism award

The Gerald Loeb Award is given annually for multiple categories of business reporting. Special awards were occasionally given for distinguished business journalism that doesn't necessarily fit into other categories.

== Gerald Loeb Special Award winners ==
- 1966: Marcus Gleisser, The Cleveland Plain Dealer

He was awarded for a series on the financial difficulties of luxury apartments in Greater Cleveland.

- 1968: Nicholas Molodovsky, Financial Analysts Journal

He was awarded for his twenty years of "outstanding contributions to investment theory."

- 1968: Newsweek Magazine

The magazine was awarded for its 1967 financial columns by Milton Freedman, Paul Samuelson, and Henry Wallich.

- 1969: McGraw-Hill

Article:

"Business and the Urban Crisis", February 1968

- 1970: Philip B. Osborne, Business Week

Article:

"Special Report: The War Business Must Win", November 1, 1969

- 1972: James W. Michaels of Forbes

He provided "distinguished service to financial journalism."

- 1973: Louis Rukeyser of Wall Street Week

The first Gerald Loeb Award given to a television program.

- 1975: "Auditing the IRS" by Donald Bartlett and James Steele, Philadelphia Inquirer

Articles in Series:
1. "IRS Misses Billions, Stalks Little Guy", April 14, 1974
2. "Nixon Reflects Typical Errors Of High Bracket", April 14, 1974
3. "One Man’s $1 Million Tax Bill", April 15, 1974
4. "Saga of a Fugitive Debtor", April 16, 1974
5. "Financier, Taxes Missing", April 17, 1974
6. "Affluent Bloom Owes Big Tax", April 18, 1974
7. "Tax Court Is Not Very Taxing for the Wealthy", April 19, 1974
8. "IRS Runs on Secret Rulings", April 20, 1974

- 1976: "Don't Worry, It's Only Money" by John Guinther, Philadelphia Magazine

His article analyzed public money mismanagement by Pennsylvania state officials.

- 1983: "Articles on the Outcome of the AT&T and IBM Antitrust Cases" by the Business and Financial Staff (including Frederick Andrews) of The New York Times
- 1985: Robert Heilbroner of The New Yorker
- 1987: Los Angeles Times

The Times was awarded for its overall excellence of business coverage.

- 1994: John Hays of the Morning Paper of Ruston, Louisiana.

He was awarded for an investigative series on Towers Financial Corporation.
