= Noam Scheiber =

American writer and journalist

Noam Scheiber /ˈnoʊm ˈʃaɪbər/ is a workplace and labor reporter for The New York Times, focusing on white-collar workers; he joined the Times in 2015. Scheiber was previously a senior editor for The New Republic, which he wrote for from 2000 through 2014. He has contributed to numerous other news outlets, including The Washington Post, CNN, CNBC and National Public Radio.

== Early life and education ==
Scheiber earned a bachelor's degree in mathematics from Tulane University, followed by a master's degree in economics from Oxford University. He was a Rhodes Scholar as well as a Truman Scholar.

== Career ==
Scheiber's first book, The Escape Artists: How Obama's Team Fumbled the Recovery, was released in February 2012. Based on more than 250 interviews, combined with the author's informed commentary, the book discusses the Obama administration's economic team and their handling of the economic recovery in the wake of the 2008 financial crisis.

Scheiber shared the 2018 Gerald Loeb Award for Beat Reporting for the story "Automating Hate".

Scheiber's second book, Mutiny; The Rise and Revolt of the College-Educated Working Class, was published by Farrar, Straus and Giroux in April 2026. The book delves into the responses of younger workers to the difficult economic environment they are contending with in the 2020s.
