= Gerald Loeb Award winners for Broadcast =

American journalism award

The Gerald Loeb Award is given annually for multiple categories of business reporting. The "Broadcast Enterprise" category was awarded in 2012 for a radio story that aired on National Public Radio, and the "Broadcast" category was awarded in 2013 for a television news story that aired on WFAA-TV. "Broadcast" was replaced by "Video/Audio" in 2014.

== Gerald Loeb Award for Broadcast Enterprise (2012) ==
- "When Patents Attack" by Laura Sydell and Alex Blumberg, NPR

Story:
1. "When Patents Attack", July 22, 2011

== Gerald Loeb Award for Broadcast (2013) ==
- "Denticaid: Medicaid Dental Abuse in Texas" by Byron Harris, Billy Bryant, Jason Trahan and Mark Smith, WFAA-TV

== See also ==
- Gerald Loeb Award winners for Radio
- Gerald Loeb Award winners for Television
