= L. J. Davis =

American journalist

Lawrence James Davis (better known as L. J. Davis; July 2, 1940 – April 5, 2011) was an American writer, whose novels focused on Brooklyn, New York.

Davis's novel, A Meaningful Life, described by the Village Voice as a "scathing 1971 satire about a reverse-pioneer from Idaho who tries to redeem his banal existence through the renovation of an old slummed-up Brooklyn town house", was reissued in 2009, with an introduction by Jonathan Lethem. Lethem, a childhood friend of one of Davis's sons, praised the novel in an essay about Brooklyn authors, which resulted in New York Review Books Classics reprinting it after nearly 40 years. A 2021 retrospective on Davis's novels published on Lit Hub described his writings as some of the earliest prototypes of modern-day gentrification narratives.

Davis served in the Army National Guard and graduated from Stanford University in 1962. He completed two years of graduate work in history at Columbia University before returning to Stanford as a Stegner Fellow in creative writing for the 1964–1965 academic year; thereafter, he moved to Brooklyn. While living in Brooklyn, Davis participated in the brownstoning neighborhood association that named his South Brooklyn neighborhood of Boerum Hill, where he owned his own brownstone and rented out another nearby home to tenants. He was the recipient of a Guggenheim Fellowship in 1975 to write fiction, but then began to write journalism, notably for Harper's Magazine. He received the 1982 Gerald Loeb Award for Magazines for a two part story on the Hunt brothers' attempt to corner the world silver market.

Davis died at his home in Brooklyn on April 5, 2011.

== Novels ==
- Whence All But He Had Fled (1968)
- Cowboys Don't Cry (1969, Viking Press. reprinted 1970, Ace Books)
- A Meaningful Life (1971, 2009)
- Walking Small (1974)

== Non-fiction books ==
- Bad Money: Big Business Disasters in the Age of a Credit Crisis (1982)
- Billionaire Shell Game: How Cable Baron John Malone and Assorted Corporate Titans Invented a Future Nobody Wanted (1998)
- Fleet Fire: Thomas Edison and the Pioneers of the Electric Revolution (2003)
