= Tony Bartelme =

American journalist

- Born: Minneapolis, Minnesota, United States
- Occupations: Journalist, Author

Tony Bartelme, an American journalist and author, is the senior projects reporter for The Post and Courier in Charleston, South Carolina. He has been a finalist for four Pulitzer Prizes.

== Biography ==
Bartelme was born in 1963, in Minneapolis, Minnesota. His father, Joe Bartelme, was an executive with NBC News until his death in 1991. Bartelme's mother, Margaret, is a teacher. Bartelme's son, Luke, played the character "TJ" on Lifetime's drama "Army Wives" for four seasons.

Bartelme began his journalism career at The Greenville (South Carolina) News-Piedmont after earning a bachelor of science degree in 1984 from Northwestern University's Medill School of Journalism. He has been with The Post and Courier in Charleston, South Carolina, since 1990.

While with The Post and Courier, Bartelme was recognized for combining investigative reporting with magazine-style narratives on complex issues ranging from pension abuse to toxic algae blooms. In 2018, judges for the Society of Environmental Journalists award for beat reporting, said his “skill is evident as he dives deep time and again to deliver deftly-crafted, enterprising features on serious topics.”

== Awards ==
- In 2021, Columbia Journalism School awarded Bartelme its John Chancellor Award for Journalism Excellence, an honor presented to a journalist for his or her cumulative accomplishments. Judges cited a career of ground-breaking environmental and investigative stories that stretched the limits of what local newspapers offer their readers.
- In 2020, Bartelme was part of a team of reporters that was a finalist for a Pulitzer Prize for a climate change project called Rising Waters.
- In 2019, Bartelme won the inaugural Victor K. McElheny Knight Science Journalism Award for a story about climate change and the Gulf Stream.
- In 2018, Bartelme won the Gerald Loeb Award for Feature business journalism and American Society of News Editors Deborah Howell Award for a story about the demise of the Piggly Wiggly Carolina grocery chain.
- In 2017, the American Geophysical Union awarded Bartelme its Walter Sullivan Award for Excellence in Science Journalism for "Every Other Breath," a series about climate change issues.
- In 2017, the National Press Foundation awarded its Technology in Journalism Award for "Chasing Carbon," a story that was part of the "Every Other Breath" series.
- In 2016, Bartelme was part of a reporting team that won a Scripps Howard Foundation award for community journalism about an investigation into police shootings in South Carolina.
- In 2016, Bartelme was a member of a reporting team that was a finalist for the Pulitzer Prize in the breaking news reporting category for stories about the fatal shooting of Walter Scott.
- In 2013, Bartelme's series about high insurance rates was a finalist for the Pulitzer Prize in explanatory writing and winner of the Sigma Delta Chi Award for non-deadline reporting for papers with circulations between 50,000 and 150,000.
- In 2011, Bartelme was a Pulitzer Prize finalist for in Feature Writing, for his series about a neurosurgeon's work to teach brain surgery in Tanzania.
- In 2011, Bartelme was awarded a Nieman Fellowship at Harvard University.
- In 2009, Bartelme won the National Press Association's Stokes Award for Best Energy Writing.
- In 2008, Bartelme won the Gerald Loeb Award for Small Newspapers for a story about the effect of China's growth on local economies.
- Bartelme won the 2007 Associated Press Managing Editors award for international perspective for newspapers under 150,000 circulation. Bartelme has won more than 50 South Carolina Press Association Awards, including Journalist of the Year.

== Author ==
Bartelme has written or co-written five books:

- Rising Waters: Reports from Across a Rapidly Warming World, 2025, Evening Post Books.
- A Surgeon in the Village: An American Doctor Teaches Brain Surgery in Africa, 2017, Beacon Press. Title in Canada: Send Forth the Healing Sun: The Unexpected True Story About Teaching Brain Surgery in the African Bush, 2016, HarperCollins/Canada.
- Second Chance: The Mark Sanford Story, 2013.
- The Bridge Builders and Charleston's Grand New Span, with Jessica VanEgeren, 2005.
- Into the Wind: The story of the world's longest race, with Brian Hicks, 1999.

He wrote the screenplay for Born to the Wind, a documentary narrated by Peter Fonda on the 1998-1999 Around Alone sailing race. The documentary won a Telly and Moscow Festival Special Award.
