= Ed Wallace =

American radio personality (1953–2025)

Ed Wallace (May 4, 1953 – December 28, 2025) was an American radio host. He was the founder and owner of Mogul & Mogul Productions in Fort Worth, Texas. He was a former car salesman. He was the former presenter of Wheels with Ed Wallace which broadcast out of Dallas, Texas on radio station KLIF 570 AM, retiring in 2022. The show, which was also broadcast over the Internet, focused mainly on automotive subjects and was sponsored by local dealerships .

Wallace also wrote a weekly column in the Fort Worth Star-Telegram and was a contributing writer for BusinessWeek online.

The show has been given the Dallas Press Club's Katy Award for "Best Radio Documentary" and Wallace was a recipient of the 2001 Gerald Loeb Award for Radio from the Anderson School of Business at UCLA for outstanding business journalism.

Wallace died at his home in Fort Worth, on December 28, 2025, at the age of 72.
