= Gerald Loeb Award winners for Personal Finance and Personal Service =

American journalism award

The Gerald Loeb Award is given annually for multiple categories of business reporting. The "Personal Finance" category was awarded in 2010–2018, with eligibility open to print, online, and broadcast journalists who have a track record of informing and protecting individual investors and consumers without having a personal agenda or conflict of interest. The category was renamed "Personal Service" in 2019 and expanded to include journalists in all media. It was renamed "Personal Finance & Consumer Reporting" in 2020.

== Gerald Loeb Award winners for Personal Finance (2010–2018) ==
- 2010: "From Prison to the Pinnacle" by Matthew Hathaway, Elizabethe Holland, and Jim Gallagher, St. Louis Post-Dispatch

Articles in Series:
1. "From prison to the pinnacle", April 19, 2009
2. "Pressure tactics used at US Fidelis", April 24, 2009
3. "Warranty sales skim top profit", May 24, 2009

- 2011: "Student Debt" by Ron Lieber, The New York Times

Articles in Series:
1. "Placing the Blame as Students Are Buried in Debt", May 29, 2010
2. "Student Debt And a Push For Fairness", June 5, 2010
3. "What Love Joins Together, Debt Can Put Asunder", September 4, 2010

- 2012: "'Protecting Your Parents' Series" by Penelope Wang, Kim Clark, and Lisa Gibbs, Money

Articles in Series:
1. "How You Can Help", June 2011
2. "What Happens As The Brain Ages", June 2011
3. "The Papers You Need to Prepare", June 2011
4. "Keep Them Safe @ Home", June 2011
5. "How Tech Helps Caregivers", June 2011
6. "Call on These Experts", June 2011
7. "Keep The Sharks at Bay", August 2011

- 2013: "The Intelligent Investor" by Jason Zweig, The Wall Street Journal

Columns:
1. "Meet Suze Orman's Newsletter Guru", January 21–22, 2012
2. "Can 'Skin in the Game' Pose conflicts?", June 2–3, 2012
3. "A Fund Manager's Home Cooking", June 16–17, 2012
4. "High Rates? Are You Delirious?", July 14–15, 2012
5. "Will These Royal Yields Rule?", December 11, 2012

- 2014: "60 Minutes: 40 Million Mistakes" by Steve Kroft, Bill Owens, Jeff Fager, James Jacoby, Michael Karzis, and Matthew Lev, CBS News
- 2015: "Helping Retirees Navigate Pension Cuts in Detroit’s Bankruptcy" by Susan Tompor, Detroit Free Press
- 2016: "Aging's Costliest Challenge" by Donna Rosato, Kate Santichen, Alexandra Mondalek and Shayla Hunter, Money Magazine
- 2017: “The High Cost of Coping” by Taylor Tepper and Elizabeth O'Brien for Money Magazine

Articles in Series:
1. "The High Cost of Coping”, December 2016
2. "The High Cost of Coping" (Online), December 2016
3. "They Fought a Daughter’s Heroin Addiction and Their Insurer, at the Same Time", December 21, 2016
4. "What to Tell Your Boss About Your Mental Health Diagnosis", December 21, 2016
5. "A Comprehensive Guide to the Best Mental Health Resources", December 21, 2016

- 2018: "The Equifax Breach" by Ron Lieber,The New York Times

== Gerald Loeb Award winners for Personal Service (2019) ==
- 2019: "The Daunting Road to Loan Forgiveness" by Ron Lieber, The New York Times

Articles in Series:
1. "A Student Loan Fix for a Teacher", March 30, 2018
2. "A $350 Million Fund Helps Many Public Servants. Meet the Ones Left Out.", April 6, 2018
3. "Who Is a Public Servant? Borrowers Have a Lot Riding on the Answer", April 13, 2018
4. "The Public Student Loan Forgiveness Rescue Hasn’t Gone Well So Far", October 17, 2018
5. "A Teacher’s Long Road to Student Loan Forgiveness (and a $4,500 Surprise)", December 7, 2018

== Gerald Loeb Award winners for Personal Finance & Consumer Reporting (2020-present) ==
- 2020: "The TuboTax Trap" by Justin Elliott, Paul Kiel, Ariana Tobin and Lucas Waldron, ProPublica
- 2021: "Evenflo, Maker of the 'Big Kid' Booster Seat, Put Profits Over Child Safety" by Daniela Porat, Patricia Callahan, and Lucas Waldron, ProPublica
- 2022: "Amazon's Advantage" by Adrianne Jeffries, Leon Yin, Evelyn Larrubia, Gabriel Hongsdusit, Ben Tanen, Micha Gorelick, Ritu Ghiya, and Jeff Crouse, The Markup

Articles:
1. "When Amazon Takes the Buy Box, It Doesn't Give It Up", October 14, 2021
2. "Amazon Puts Its Own 'Brands' First", October 14, 2021
3. "How We Analyzed Amazon’s Treatment of Its 'Brands' in Search Results", October 14, 2021
4. "Citing Markup Investigation, Lawmakers Demand Answers from Amazon", October 18, 2021

- 2023: "Diagnosis: Debt" by Noam N. Levey, Aneri Pattani, Yuki Noguchi, Anna Werner, Bram Sable-Smith, Juweek Adolphe, and Megan Kalata, The Wall Street Journal
