= Paul Steiger =

Chairman of ProPublica and former head of The Wall Street Journal (born 1942)

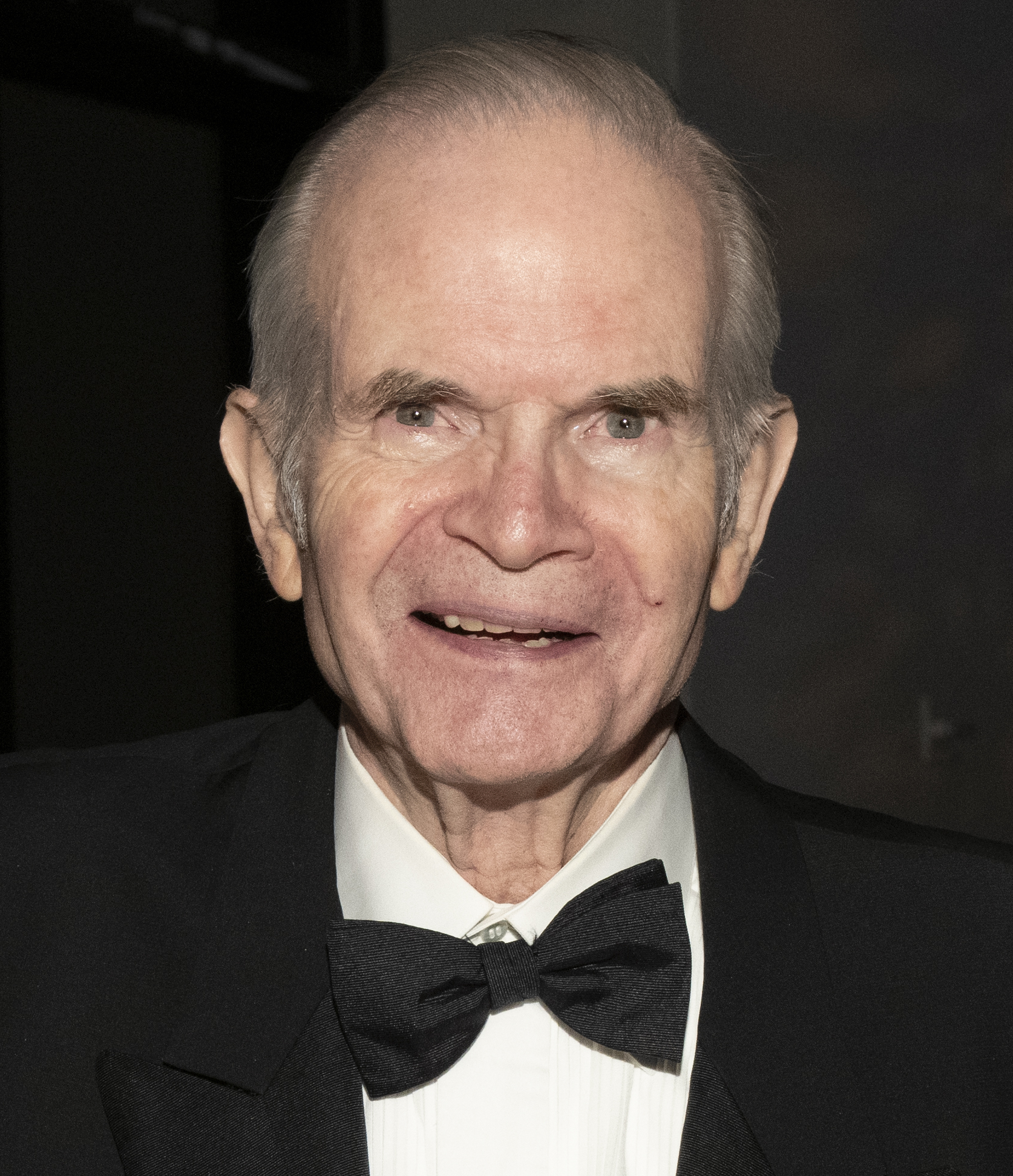
- Steiger in 2022
- Born: August 15, 1942 (age 83); New York City, U.S.
- Employer: ProPublica

Paul Steiger (born August 15, 1942) is an American journalist who served as managing editor of The Wall Street Journal from 1991 until May 15, 2007. After that, he was the founding editor-in-chief, CEO and president of ProPublica from 2008 through 2012.

Steiger was born in the Bronx to a Roman Catholic family and grew up in Stamford, Connecticut, and Princeton, New Jersey. He graduated from the Hun School of Princeton and was a member of Trumbull College at Yale University, where he was an editor of the Yale Daily News and a member of Manuscript Society. He worked for the Los Angeles Times from 1966 to 1983.

He is currently the executive chairman of ProPublica. He chaired the Committee to Protect Journalists and has won numerous journalism awards. He is a member of the Council on Foreign Relations.

His daughter, Laura Yanovich, is a film editor.

== Awards ==
- 1974 Gerald Loeb Award for Large Newspapers for "Use by Some Banks of Loan Loopholes Worries Regulators"
- 1978 Gerald Loeb Award for Large Newspapers for "The Dollar: Its History and Current Woes"
- 2002 Gerald Loeb Lifetime Achievement Award
