= Michael Mandel (economist) =

American economist and journalist

Michael J. Mandel is an American economist, author, and journalist. He is the chief economic strategist for the Progressive Policy Institute, and president of South Mountain Economies, LLC.

Mandel worked for twelve years at Businessweek. During his last eight years with the magazine, he held the position of chief economist. Mandel wrote more than fifty cover stories for Businessweek, and was the recipient of multiple awards; he won the Gerald Loeb Award in 1998 and was named one of the top 100 business journalists of the 20th century in 2000.

Mandel is senior fellow at the Wharton School of the University of Pennsylvania (Mack Institute for Innovation Management) and was appointed a fellow at the Manufacturing Policy Initiative at Indiana University.

In 1985, he graduated from Harvard University with a Ph.D. in economics, having previously obtained a master's degree in economics, (1981) and a bachelor's degree in applied mathematics (1978). After leaving Harvard, he served as assistant economics professor at New York University Stern School of Business until 1989.

== Awards and recognition ==
- 1994 Winner, National Magazine Awards
- 1994 Finalist, Gerald Loeb Award
- 1998 Winner, Gerald Loeb Award in the magazine category, with Dean Foust, for their "New Economy" package, Businessweek
- 1999 Finalist, National Magazine Awards
- 2000 Named among the Top 100 Business News Luminaries of the 20th Century
- 2002 Winner, Excellence in Economic Reporting, for "Teach Lead–Both Up and Down, Businessweek
- 2006 Winner, Economic Journalist of the Year, by the World Leadership Forum
- 2009 Finalist, Gerald Loeb Award, commentary category, for "Michael Mandel Columns", Businessweek

== Selected bibliography ==
- The High-Risk Society: Peril and Promise in the New Economy, 1st ed., Times Business, 1996.
- The Coming Internet Depression, Basic Books, 2000.
- Rational Exuberance: Silencing the Enemies of Growth and Why the Future Is Better Than You Think, 1st ed., HarperBusiness, 2004.
- Economics: The Basics, McGraw-Hill, revised edition of the 2012 textbook, 2018.
