= List of Gerald Loeb Business Book Award winners =

American journalism award

The Gerald Loeb Award is given annually for multiple categories of business reporting. A Special Book Award was given in 1969. An award for Books was given in 1974, and the category was called Business Book from 2006 to 2012.

== Gerald Loeb Special Book Award (1969) ==
- 1969: The Money Game by George J. W. Goodman, Random House

== Gerald Loeb Award for Books (1974) ==
- 1974: The Go-Go Years by John Brooks, Weybright and Talley

== Gerald Loeb Award for Business Book (2006–2012) ==
- 2006: DisneyWar by James B. Stewart, Simon & Schuster
- 2007: The Long Tail: Why the Future of Business is Selling Less of More by Chris Anderson, Hyperion
- 2008: Mine's Bigger: Tom Perkins and the Making of the Greatest Sailing Machine Ever Built by David A. Kaplan, William Morrow

"This tale of venture capital pioneer Tom Perkins and his quest to build the world’s greatest clipper ship was a compelling story about one of the most influential figures in the Silicon Valley. Kaplan artfully wove great reporting into his narrative, making for an entertaining, smart and powerful book."

- 2009: Trillion Dollar Meltdown: Easy Money, High Rollers, and the Great Credit Crash by Charles R. Morris, PublicAffairs
- 2010: Too Big to Fail: The Inside Story of How Wall Street and Washington Fought to Save the Financial System - and Themselves by Andrew Ross Sorkin, Penguin Group (USA) - Viking
- 2011: More Money Than God: Hedge Funds and the Making of a New Elite by Sebastian Mallaby, The Penguin Press
- 2012: Steve Jobs by Walter Isaacson, Simon & Schuster
- 2012: (Honorable Mention) Poor Economics by Abhijit V. Banerjee and Esther Duflo
