= Gerald Loeb Award winners for Explanatory =

American journalism award

The Gerald Loeb Award for Explanatory is given annually for journalism pieces showing exemplary in-depth analysis and clear presentation of a complex business subject. First awarded in 2011, the "Explanatory" category was restricted to print, broadcast, and online works, then opened to all mediums in 2015. The first "Explanatory" award was given in 2011.

== Gerald Loeb Award winners for Explanatory (2011–present) ==
- 2011: "Edifice Complex" by David Nicklaus and Tim Logan, St. Louis Post-Dispatch

Articles in Series:
1. "If you build it... jobs still may not come", November 14, 2010
2. "Area stunts growth by feeding on itself", November 15, 2010
3. "A powerful lobby built by incentives", November 16, 2010

- 2012: Scott Pelley, Robert G. Anderson, Daniel Ruetenik, Robert J. Shattuck and Nicole Young, CBS News 60 Minutes

Story:

"The Next Housing Shock"

- 2013: "Beef's Raw Edges" by Mike McGraw and Alan Bavley, The Kansas City Star

Articles in Series:
1. "Beef's Raw Edges", December 9, 2012
2. "The Industry's Response", December 9, 2012
3. "Inside America's largest beef factories", December 9, 2012
4. "From Calf to Kitchen: The Journay of A Beef Cow", December 9, 2012
5. "Costco's E. coli-testing procedures rival government", December 9, 2012
6. "What's safest? Cook it fully", December 9, 2012
7. "Building bigger cattle: An industry overdose", December 10, 2012
8. "The Industry's Response", December 10, 2012
9. "Beefed Up Corridor", December 10, 2012
10. "Using money, science to win over stomachs", December 11, 2012
11. "The Industry's Response", December 11, 2012

- 2014: "Assets of the Ayatollah" by Steve Stecklow, Babak Dehghanpisheh, and Yeganeh Torbati, Reuters

Articles in Series:
1. "Khamenei controls massive financial empire built on property seizures", November 11, 2013
2. "Khamenei's conglomerate thrived as sanctions squeezed Iran", November 12, 2013
3. "To expand Khamenei’s grip on the economy, Iran stretched its laws", November 13, 2013

- 2015: "Borrowing Trouble" by Jason Grotto and Heather Gillers, Chicago Tribune

Articles in Series:
1. "Risky bonds prove costly for Chicago Public Schools", November 7, 2014
2. "Banks kept CPS in shaky bond market", November 10, 2014
3. "Illinois lawmakers opened door to risky CPS bond deals", November 11, 2014

- 2016: "Insult to Injury: America's Vanishing Worker Protections" by Michael Grabell, Howard Berkes and Lena Groeger, ProPublica and NPR

Stories in Series
1. "Injured Workers Suffer As 'Reforms' Limit Workers' Compensation Benefits", March 4, 2015
2. "'Grand Bargain' In Workers' Comp Unravels, Harming Injured Workers Further", March 5, 2015
3. "As Workers' Comp Varies From State To State, Workers Pay The Price", March 6, 2015

- 2017: "Superbug Spreaders" by Natalie Obiko Pearson, Sharang Limaye, Jason Gale, Lydia Mulvany, Monte Reel, Stephanie Baker, Wenxin Fan, and Adi Narayan, Bloomberg News

Articles in Series:
1. "Antibiotic Apocalypse Fear Stoked by India’s Drugged Chickens", March 29, 2016
2. "Baby's Death Shows Global Threat From Wonder Drugs Demise", March 29, 2016
3. "China’s Five-Star Pig Pens Are Latest Weapons in the Superbug War", September 19, 2016
4. "Why Superbugs Are Beating Big Pharma", September 21, 2016
5. "How Antibiotic-Tainted Seafood From China Ends Up on Your Table", December 15, 2016

- 2018: "The Body Trade" by Brian Grow, John Shiffman, Blake Morrison, Elizabeth Culliford, Reade Levinson, Nicholas Bogel-Burroughs, Zach Goelman and Mike Wood, Reuters

Articles in Series:

1. "Part 1: Body Brokers", October 24, 2017

- "In the U.S. market for human bodies, almost anyone can dissect and sell the dead"
- "Video: At this family firm, dissecting the dead is an art and a "thrill""
- "Donated cadavers are essential to medical training, doctors say"

2. "Part 2: Desperate Gift", October 25, 2017

- "A Reuters journalist bought human body parts, then learned a donor's heart-wrenching story"
- "How and why a Reuters journalist purchased human body parts"

3. "Part 3: Industry Leader", October 27, 2017

- "How an American company made a fortune selling bodies donated to science"

4. "Part 4: Grisly Case", OCtober 31, 2017

- "In a warehouse of horrors, body broker allegedly kept human heads stacked on his shelves"
- "Criminals, slaves and minorities: the unseemly past of the body trade"

5. "Part 5: Mystery Woman", November 2, 2017

- "Mystery in the woods: In 2014, a woman’s severed head was found. Who is she?"

6. "Part 6: Unexpected Guests", December 15, 2017

- "Cadavers in the ballroom: Doctors practice their craft in America’s favorite hotels"

7. "Part 7: The Chop Shop", December 27, 2017

- "A business where human bodies were butchered, packaged and sold"

8. "Q&A: Body Donations", October 24, 2017

- "Body donation: Frequently asked questions"

- 2019: "Sign Here to Lose Anything" by Zachary R. Mider, Zeke Faux, Demetrios Pogkas and David Ingold, Bloomberg News

Articles in Series:

1. "Part 1: I Hereby Confess Judgment", November 20, 2018
2. "Part 2: The $1.7 Million Man", November 27, 2018
3. "Part 3: Rubber-Stamp Justice", November 29, 2018
4. "Part 4: Business-Loan Kingpin", December 3, 2018
5. "Part 5: Fall Behind on These Loans? You Might Get a Visit From Gino", December 20, 2018

- 2020: "Death by a Thousand Clicks" by Erika Fry and Fred Schulte, Fortune and Kaiser Health News

Story:

"Death by a Thousand Clicks: Where Electronic Health Records Went Wrong", March 18, 2019

- 2021: "Fumed Out" by Kiera Feldman, Los Angeles Times

Article:

"How toxic fumes seep into the air you breathe on planes", December 17, 2020

- 2022: "Inside TikTok's Dangerously Addictive Algorithm" by Rob Barry, Georgia Wells, John West, Joanna Stern, Frank Matt, Tawnell D. Hobbs, Yoree Koh, Jason French, and Julie Jargon, The Wall Street Journal

Article:

"Inside TikTok’s Algorithm: A WSJ Video Investigation", July 21, 2021

- 2023: "Repowering the West" by Sammy Roth, Robert Gauthier, Maggie Beidelman, Jessica Q. Chen, Claire Hannah Collins, Ashley Cai, and Thomas Suh Lauder, Los Angeles Times
