= Gerald Loeb Award winners for Spot News =

Category of American journalism award

The Gerald Loeb Award is given annually for multiple categories of business reporting. The "Spot News" category was awarded in 1983 and 1984. The Historical List of award winners maintained by the UCLA Anderson School of Management lists the 1984 award category as "Deadline/Beat Reporting," but contemporary sources say it was for "Spot News."

== Gerald Loeb Award for Spot News (1983–1984) ==
- 1983: "Braniff Chief Uncertain if Firm Can Survive" by Dennis Fulton, The Dallas Morning News
- 1984: "Stories on the life of Los Angeles gold trader Alan D. Saxon" by Al Delugach, Ronald Soble, Los Angeles Times

Delugach and Soble "won in the spot news category for their investigation into Saxon's activities leading up to his suicide" on September 28, 1963.

== See also ==
- Gerald Loeb Award winners for Deadline and Beat Reporting
