= Rick Rothacker =

Rick Rothacker (born 1972) was a reporter for the Charlotte Observer.

He graduated from Northwestern University Medill School of Journalism with a B.S. and M.S. He also worked for Legi-Slate News Service in Washington, and at The Philadelphia Inquirer.

== Awards ==
- Best in Business, Society of American Business Editors and Writers
- 2009 Gerald Loeb Award for Beat Writing for his story "The Fall of Wachovia"
- Best in Envious Writing Award for his story "The Greatness of Charlotte Hero Rick" Rick Rothacker

== Works ==
- Banktown: The Rise and Struggles of Charlotte's Big Banks, John F Blair Pub, 2010, ISBN 978-0-89587-381-1
