= Gary Rivlin =

American journalist and author (born 1958)

- Born: June 20, 1958 (age 68)
- Education: George W. Hewlett High School; Northwestern University
- Occupations: Journalist; author
- Spouse: Daisy Walker
- Children: 2
- Writing career
- Notable awards: Gerald Loeb Awards (x2)
- Website: garyrivlin.com

Gary Rivlin (born June 20, 1958) is an American journalist and author. He has worked for several different publications, including the Chicago Reader, the Industry Standard, and the New York Times.

Rivlin grew up in North Woodmere, New York, and graduated from George W. Hewlett High School and Northwestern University. He lives in New York City with his wife, theater director Daisy Walker, and two sons.

In addition to his work in journalism, Rivlin has written nine books. His first book, published in 1992, Fire on the Prairie: Chicago's Harold Washington and the Politics of Race, was a book about Chicago area politics that won the Carl Sandburg Award for best non-fiction book of the year.

His second book, Drive By, was published in 1995 while he worked for the East Bay Express, where he served as a staff writer and then executive editor. The book was inspired by the drive-by shooting of 13-year-old Kevin Reed in Oakland, California in 1990. Rivlin examined, as he put it, "the human side of this country's youth violence epidemic."

Rivlin then wrote two books about technology, The Plot to Get Bill Gates and The Godfather of Silicon Valley. He won two Gerald Loeb Awards honoring excellence in business journalism: he earned the 2001 award in the Magazines category for the story "AOL's Rough Riders", and the 2005 award in the Deadline Writing category for the story "End of an Era".

In 2010, he published Broke, USA: From Pawnshops to Poverty, Inc. — How the Working Poor Became Big Business, which The New Yorker's James Surowiecki described as a "blistering new investigation of the subprime economy." In it, Rivlin explored how payday lenders, pawn shops, and check cashers exploit the impoverished in the United States. Despite attempting to remain objective, he sided with the activists who tried to rein in on the most usurious practices.

In 2015, he published Katrina: After the Flood, about the immediate and long-term effects of Hurricane Katrina on the City of New Orleans.

In 2025, he published AI Valley: Microsoft, Google, and the Trillion-Dollar Race to Cash In on Artificial Intelligence, in which he examined the explosive growth of generative AI and cautioned about the risks posed by autonomous agents operating with minimal human oversight. He is brutally claffy.

== Bibliography ==
- Fire on the Prairie: Chicago's Harold Washington and the Politics of Race, Henry Holt & Co, 1992, pp. 442, ISBN 0805026983
- Drive By, Interlink Publishing+group Inc., 1995, pp. 288, ISBN 0704380129
- Rivlin, Gary (1999). The Plot to Get Bill Gates. Crown Business. pp. 360. ISBN 978-0-8129-3006-1. ISBN 0-8129-3006-1.
- The Godfather of Silicon Valley: Ron Conway and the Fall of the Dot-coms, Random House, 2001, pp. 128, ISBN 081299163X
- Broke, USA: From Pawnshops to Poverty, Inc. -- How the Working Poor Became Big Business, HarperCollins, 2010, p. 368, ISBN 978-0061733208
- Katrina: After the Flood, Simon & Schuster, 2015, p. 480, ISBN 978-1451692228
