= Gerald Loeb Award winners for Radio =

American journalism award

The Gerald Loeb Award is given annually for multiple categories of business reporting. The "Radio" category was awarded in 1997 and 1999–2001.

== Gerald Loeb Award for Radio (1997, 1999–2001) ==
- 1997: Sarah Gardner, Marketplace-USC radio

Story:

"Bottom Line Blues"

- 1999: by Karen Tofte and team, Minnesota Public Radio

Story:

"The World Turned Upside Down", March 18, 1998

- 2000: "Minnesota in the Dot Com Age" by Carl Goldstein and team, Minnesota Public Radio
- 2001: "The 100 Greatest Events in the History of the Automotive Industry" by Ed Wallace, KLIF-AM
