= Patricia Callahan =

Investigative journalist

Patricia Callahan is a Pulitzer Prize-winning American investigative journalist for ProPublica.

== Early life and career ==
Callahan attended from Maine South High School in Park Ridge, Illinois and graduated from Northwestern University's Medill School of Journalism in 1993. Following graduating, Callahan was a Henry Luce Scholar in Thailand.

Callahan began her career at the Wall Street Journal and the Denver Post. While at the Denver Post, she was part of team that won the 2000 Pulitzer Prize for Breaking News Reporting for its coverage of the Columbine High School shooting.

In 2004, Callahan started working on the investigative team at the Chicago Tribune. While at the Chicago Tribune, she launched the project “Hidden Hazards: Kids at Risk" for which the newspaper won the 2008 Pulitzer Prize for Investigative Reporting. The project led to national consumer product safety reforms and prompted the recall of more than one million products.

In 2012, Callahan along with colleagues Sam Roe and Michael Hawthorne published an investigation into the use of flame retardants in consumer products. They were named finalists for the 2013 Pulitzer Prize for Investigative Reporting "for their exposure of manufacturers that imperil public health by continuing to use toxic fire retardants in household furniture and crib mattresses, triggering reform efforts at the state and national level." The series also won the 2013 Goldsmith Prize for Investigative Reporting.

Callahan and Michael J. Berens were named finalists for the 2017 Pulitzer Prize for Investigative Reporting and awarded the 2016 Worth Bingham Prize for Investigative Journalism for "Suffering in Secret," a series on abuse and deaths in Illinois group homes.

In 2018, Callahan joined ProPublica as a senior staff reporter covering business.

== Awards ==
- 2000 Pulitzer Prize for Breaking News Coverage (Denver Post staff award)
- 2008 Pulitzer Prize for Investigative Reporting (Chicago Tribune staff award)
- 2013 Finalist for Pulitzer Prize for Investigative Reporting (with Sam Roe and Michael Hawthorne)
- 2013 Goldsmith Prize for Investigative Reporting
- 2016 Worth Bingham Prize for Investigative Journalism (with Michael J. Berens)
- 2017 Finalist for Pulitzer Prize for Investigative Reporting (with Michael J. Berens)
- 2021 Gerald Loeb Award for Personal Finance & Consumer Reporting for "Evenflo, Maker of the 'Big Kid' Booster Seat, Put Profits Over Child Safety", ProPublica
