= Gerald Loeb Award winners for Images, Graphics, Interactives, and Visuals =

American journalism award

The Gerald Loeb Award is given annually for multiple categories of business reporting. This category was first awarded as "Images/Visuals" in 2013–2015, as "Images/Graphics/Interactives" in 2016–2018, and then as Visual Storytelling in 2019.

== Gerald Loeb Award winners for Images/Visuals (2013–2015) ==
- 2013: "Economy Interactives" by Tom Giratikanon, Amanda Cox, Sergio Pecanha, Alicia Parlapiano, Jeremy White, Robert Gebeloff, Ford Fessenden, Archie Tse, Alan McLean, Shan Carter, Mike Bostock and Matthew Ericson, The New York Times

Interactive Graphics:
1. "What Percent Are You?", January 14, 2012
2. "The Top 1 Percent: What Jobs Do They Have?", January 15, 2012
3. "The Geography of Government Benefits", February 11, 2012
4. "How the Tax Burden Has Changed", November 30, 2012
5. "Who's Hurt by the Fiscal Impasse? You Decide", December 5, 2012

- 2014: "Interactive Graphics" by Ford Fessenden, Tom Giratikanon, Josh Keller, Archie Tse, Tim Wallace, Derek Watkins, Jeremy White, Karen Yourish, Shan Carter, Hannah Fairfield, Alicia Parlapiano, Mike Bostock, Amanda Cox, Matthew Ericson, Kevin Quealy, and Josh Williams, The New York Times
- 2015: Economic Tools & Visualizations,” by Gregor Aisch, Wilson Andrews, Jeremy Ashkenas, Matthew Bloch, Mike Bostock, Shan Carter, Haeyoun Park, Alicia Parlapiano and Archie Tse, The New York Times

== Gerald Loeb Award winners for Images/Graphics/Interactives (2016–2018) ==
- 2016: "Making Data Visual" by Amanda Cox, Gregor Aisch, Kevin Quealy, Matthew Bloch, Wilson Andrews, Josh Keller, Karen Yourish, Eric Buth, Nicholas Confessore and Sarah Cohen, The New York Times
- 2017: "Business Visuals" by Larry Buchanan, Karen Yourish, Walt Bogdanich, Jacqueline Williams, Ana Graciela Mendez, Motoko Rich, Amanda Cox, and Matthew Bloch, The New York Times
- 2018: "The Trump Effect Graphics" by Christine Chan, Matthew Weber and the Reuters team, Reuters

== Gerald Loeb Award winners for Visual Storytelling (2019–present) ==
- 2019: "Tesla Tracker" by Tom Randall and Dean Halford, Bloomberg News

Article:
- "Tesla Model 3 Tracker", February 14, 2018

- 2020: "Clear Takeover" by Tracey McManus and Eli Murray, Tampa Bay Times

Article:
- "Clear Takeover", October 20, 2019

- 2021: "Visualizing the Pandemic Economy" by Rich Harris, Blacki Migliozzi, Niraj Chokshi, Bill Marsh, Guilbert Gates, Ella Koeze, Yuliya Parshina-Kottas, Larry Buchanan, Aliza Aufrichtig, Michael Corkery, Derek Watkins, Josh Holder, James Glanz, Weiyi Cai, Benedict Carey, Jeremy White, Jonah Markowitz, and Christina Goldbaum, The New York Times

Articles in Series:
1. "13,000 Missing Flights: The Global Consequences of the Coronavirus", February 21, 2020
2. "Take a Look at How Covid-19 Is Changing Meatpacking Plants", June 8, 2020
3. "How the Virus Won", July 24, 2020
4. "Transit Workers Were N.Y.C.'s Pandemic Lifeline. These 3 Paid a Price.", July 27, 2020

- 2022: "3-D Worlds" by Staff of The New York Times, The New York Times

Portfolio:
- "What the Tulsa Race Massacre Destroyed" by Yuliya Parshina-Kottas, Anjali Singhvi, Audra D.S. Burch, Troy Griggs, Mika Gröndahl, Lingdong Huang, Tim Wallace, Jeremy White, and Josh Williams, May 24, 2021
- "Why the Mexico City Metro Collapsed" by Natalie Kitroeff, Maria Abi-Habib, James Glanz, Oscar Lopez, Weiyi Cai, Evan Grothjan, Miles Peyton and Alejandro Cegarra, June 13, 2021
- "How Safe Are You From Covid When You Fly?" by Mika Gröndahl, Tariro Mzezewa, Or Fleisher, and Jeremy White, April 17, 2021
- "Why the Empire State Building, and New York, May Never Be the Same" by Keith Collins, Nikolas Diamant, Peter Eavis, Or Fleisher, Matthew Haag, Barbara Harvey, Lingdong Huang, Karthik Patanjali, Miles Peyton, and Rumsey Taylor, September 15, 2021

- 2023: "Life in Hong Kong's Shoebox Housing" by Marcelo Duhalde, Kaliz Lee, Han Huang, Adolfo Arranz, Fiona Sun, and Dennis Wong, South China Morning Post
