= Richard C. Longworth =

American author and journalist

Richard C. Longworth is an American author and journalist. He is the writer of Caught in the Middle: America’s Heartland in the Age of Globalism, on the impact of globalization on the American Midwest. He also was a visiting scholar at DePaul University and adjunct professor of international relations at Northwestern University, and is a mentor at the Harris School of Public Policy at the University of Chicago.

== Career ==
Longworth joined The Chicago Council on Global Affairs in 2003. He writes and hosts The Chicago Council blog, The Midwesterner. He is a regular contributor to the American Review.

For 20 years, Longworth was a foreign correspondent for the Chicago Tribune and United Press International, and was the Tribune’s chief European correspondent. He has reported from 80 countries on five continents. He also is the author of Global Squeeze and coauthor of Global Chicago.

Longworth, an Iowa native, graduated from Northwestern and won NU's Alumni Merit Award in 2000. He was a Nieman Fellow at Harvard University, won the Overseas Press Club award twice, for series on globalization and the UN, and was twice a finalist for the Pulitzer Prize, in 1980 and 2003 Pulitzer Prize. He also has won every major national award for economic reporting, plus the Lowell Thomas award for a story on a camel trek through the Sahara Desert. He is a member of the Council on Foreign Relations in New York, has been a speaker at the Davos conferences, and for five years was a mentor to StreetWise, Chicago's newspaper for the homeless.

== Bibliography ==
- Caught in the Middle: America’s Heartland in the Age of Globalism (Bloomsbury USA; August 2009) ISBN 978-1-5969-1590-9
- Global Squeeze (McGraw-Hill Companies; June 1998) ISBN 978-0-8092-2974-1

== Awards ==
- 1979 Gerald Loeb Award for Large Newspapers for "A.T.&T., the Biggest Company on Earth"
