= Mark Maremont =

American journalist

Mark Maremont is an American business journalist with the Wall Street Journal. Maremont has worked on reports for the Journal for which the paper received two Pulitzer Prizes.

Maremont was born in Michigan. His father was president of the Chicago-based M. D. Maremont Company, a commercial real estate firm. He graduated with a bachelor's degree in history with honors and Phi Beta Kappa from Brown University and a master's degree from the Columbia University Graduate School of Journalism.

Maremont became telecommunications editor at Business Week in August 1983. He served as London correspondent from in July 1986 until July 1992, when he became the magazine's Boston bureau chief. While at Business Week, Maremont was a 1996 National Magazine Awards finalist the reporting category for the 1995 cover story on Bausch & Lomb, titled "Blind ambition", and won the 1997 Gerald Loeb Award in the magazine category for "Abuse of Power," a 1996 cover story on sexual abuse at Astra USA.

In May 1997, Maremont joined the Wall Street Journal as a senior special writer in Boston. He became deputy bureau chief in the Boston bureau in July 2000 and is now senior editor.

In 2003, Maremont was a member of the Wall Street Journal team that wrote a series of articles for which the paper staff won the Pulitzer Prize for Explanatory Reporting. The citation read: "for its clear, concise and comprehensive stories that illuminated the roots, significance and impact of corporate scandals in America. This was originally nominated in the Public Service category, but was moved by the jury."

Maremont was a member of a Journal team that wrote a five-part series used statistical modeling to detect stock-option rigging and resulted in at least 70 executives losing their jobs. The series won the first Pulitzer Prize for Public Service for the Wall Street Journal. The citation read: "for its creative and comprehensive probe into backdated stock options for business executives that triggered investigations, the ouster of top officials and widespread change in corporate America." For the same series, Maremont and colleagues Charles Forelle and James Bandler shared the 2006 George Polk Award for Business Journalism, the Gerald Loeb Award for Large Newspapers, and the 2007 Goldsmith Prize for Investigative Reporting. Additionally, Maremont Forelle, Bandler, and Steve Stecklow were finalists for the 2007 Michael Kelly Award.

In 2012, he shared the Gerald Loeb Award for Online Enterprise for the story "Jet Tracker."

Maremont married Emily Louise Dreifus in 1984. He lives in Needham, Massachusetts.
