= Allan Sloan =

American journalist

- Born: 1944 (age 81–82); Brooklyn, New York
- Education: B.A., Brooklyn College and M.S., Columbia University Graduate School of Journalism
- Occupation: Columnist
- Awards: Seven-time winner of the Gerald Loeb Award

Allan Sloan (born 1944) is an American journalist, formerly a senior editor at large at Fortune magazine. He subsequently became a business columnist on contract for The Washington Post, and since the start of 2023 has been self-employed.

== Early years ==
Sloan was born in Brooklyn, New York and is a 1966 graduate of Brooklyn College with a B.A.; he received his M.S. as a 1967 graduate of the Columbia University Graduate School of Journalism. He attended the Jewish Theological Seminary for two years while he was an undergraduate at Brooklyn College.

== Career ==
Sloan has spoken about the economy on television shows such as Charlie Rose, The Colbert Report and regularly on American Public Media's radio program Marketplace and heard on NPR.

His first experience in journalism was as a freshman at Brooklyn College. He had been complaining about the student newspaper when his English professor, who was the paper's faculty advisor, told him that if he thought he could do a better job, then he should go to work for the paper.

Sloan got his first writing job in 1968, with the Charlotte Observer; he was originally hired as a sports writer, but later was assigned to writing about real estate. In December 1969, he was assigned to write about business and the economy.

Sloan continued working as a journalist, first as a business reporter for the Detroit Free Press, (1972–1978) and later as a staff writer for Money magazine (1982–1984). He worked as an associate editor for Forbes magazine (1979–1981) and as a senior editor (1984–1988). He was a self-syndicated columnist for Newsday before leaving for Newsweek in 1995 to become its Wall Street editor.

In 2005, during the controversy surrounding Halliburton and Dick Cheney, Sloan wrote in his article, "Halliburton Pays Dearly but Finally Escapes Cheney's Asbestos Mess," that "As Cheney's Dresser misadventure shows, today's triumphant deal champ can be tomorrow's chump." Ten months later, in a Mother Jones article, "Bush's Bad Business Empire," Sloan was quoted as saying "Cheney was a 'CEO who messed up big-time.'"

In 2007, Sloan left Newsweek and began working as a Senior Editor at Large for Fortune magazine. In 2008, Sloan won the Gerald Loeb Award for the seventh time; the prize was given for his story "House of Junk," which showed how subprime mortgages "went bad". In a 2009 story, "Unheeded Warnings," Chris Roush spoke to the fact that journalists had been "waving the red flag" for several years in the lead up to the 2008 financial crisis. Roush quoted Sloan as saying, "The fact that housing was a bubble was printed a million times."

In July 2014, "Positively Un-American" was published as a Fortune cover story, reporting on corporations dodging billions in taxes by doing something called a corporate inversion: moving their headquarters out of the U.S. and leaving American taxpayers to cover the cost of the taxes that they were dodging. The in-depth article described how the U.S. could be expected to lose approximately $19.5 billion in tax revenue between 2015 and 2024 if corporate tax reform wasn't implemented.

In the article, he included this self-described "rant":

"The spectacle of American corporations deserting our country to dodge taxes while expecting to get the same benefits that good corporate citizens get makes me deeply angry. It's the same way that I felt when idiots and incompetents in Washington brought us to the brink of defaulting on our national debt in the summer of 2011, the last time that I wrote anything angry at remotely this length...Except that this is worse."

He went on, in the article, to describe how these corporate "inverters" hesitate when it's time to "ante up" and pay their fair share of taxes.

On July 22, 2014, Sloan spoke before the United States Senate Committee on Finance, and suggested in closing, that it would be "absolutely tragic" if Congress allowed politics to stop reforms that were needed and allow the subject to dissolve into soundbites and rhetoric.

Sloan left Fortune in 2014, with his last article published in December 2014. After leaving Fortune, he wrote a business column on contract with the Washington Post, and since the beginning of 2023 he has been self-employed, writing for outlets that include Barron's, Yahoo Finance and Fast Company.

== Awards and recognition ==
Sloan has received many awards over the span of his more than 50-year career. He was picked as the Business Journalist of the Decade, by Talking Biz News for the first decade of the 21st century.

- 1975 Gerald Loeb Award for Large Newspapers for "Utility Rates: Too High or Too Low?", The Detroit Free Press
- 1985 Gerald Loeb Award for Magazines for "Full Speed Ahead - Damn the Torpedoes," Forbes
- 1991 Gerald Loeb Award for Commentary for "Deal" columns, Newsday
- 1991 John Hancock Award for Excellence in Business and Finance Journalism, Newsday
- 1993 Gerald Loeb Award for Commentary for "Deal" columns, Newsday
- 1998 Gerald Loeb Award for Commentary for selected columns, Newsweek
- 1999 Alumnus of the Year, Columbia School of Journalism
- 2001 Gerald Loeb Lifetime Achievement Award
- 2001 Distinguished Achievement Award, Society of American Business Editors and Writers
- 2008 Gerald Loeb Award for Magazines for "House of Junk," Fortune
- 2014 Finalist, Best in Business, Government, Society of American Business Editors and Writers, "Positively Un-American," Forbes
- 2023 Post-50th Lifetime Achievement Award, Brooklyn College Alumni Association
