= Gerald Loeb Award =

American journalism award

Gerald Loeb Awards
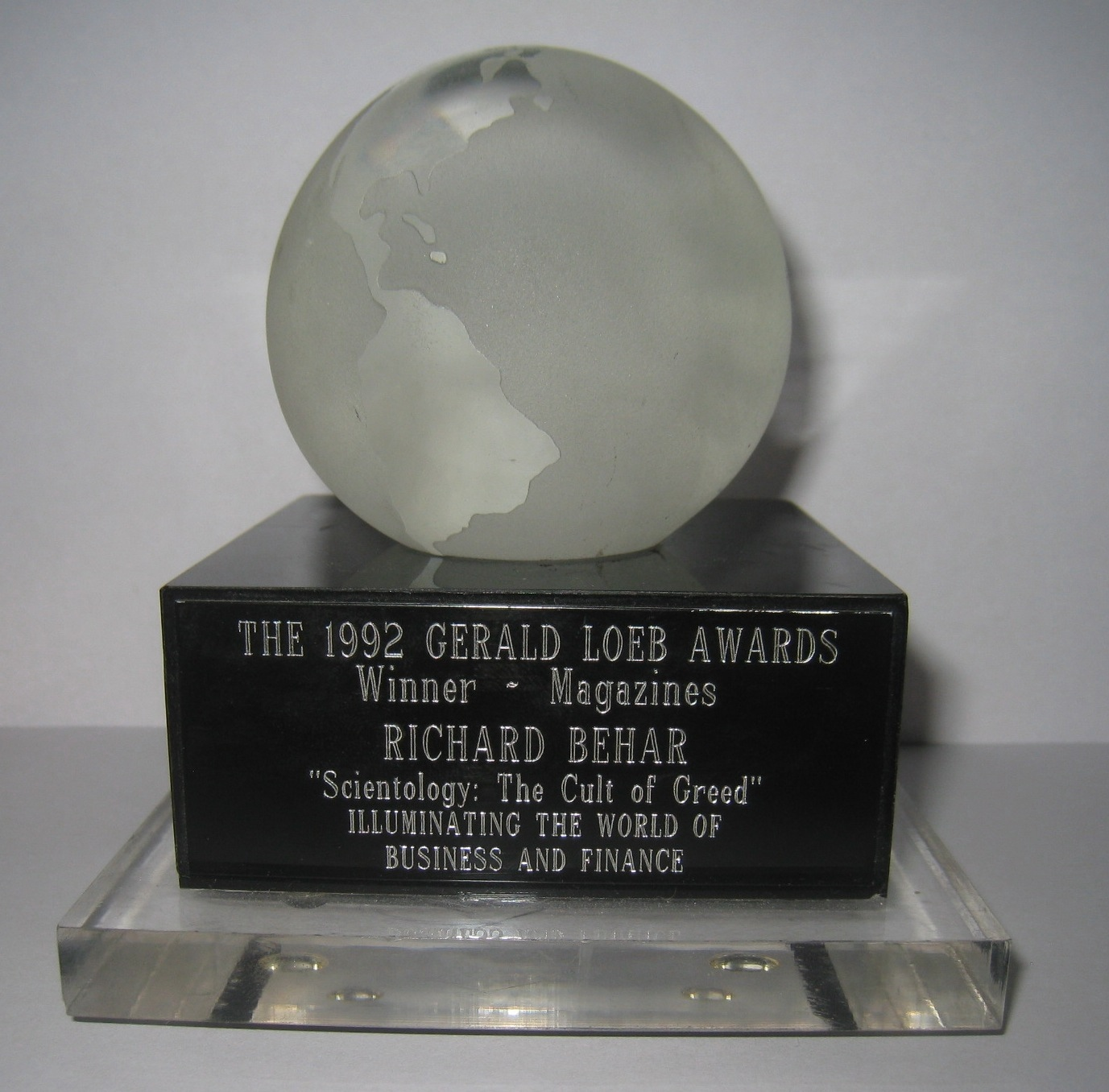
- Awarded for: Excellence in business journalism
- Country: United States
- Presented by: UCLA Anderson School of Management
- First award: 1958
- Final award: 2022
- Website: anderson.ucla.edu/gerald-loeb-awards

The Gerald Loeb Awards, also referred to as the Gerald Loeb Awards for Distinguished Business and Financial Journalism, is a recognition of excellence in journalism, especially in the fields of business, finance and the economy. The award was established in 1957 by Gerald Loeb, a founding partner of E.F. Hutton & Co. Loeb's intention in creating the award was to encourage reporters to inform and protect private investors as well as the general public in the areas of business, finance and the economy.

== Gerald Loeb ==
Loeb first became known for his book The Battle for Investment Survival, which was popular during the Great Depression and is still considered a classic. Born in 1899, Loeb began his investing career in 1921 in the bond department of a brokerage firm in San Francisco, California. He moved to New York in 1921 after joining with E. F. Hutton & Co., and became vice-chairman of the board when the company incorporated in 1962. The Wall Street Crash of 1929 greatly affected Loeb's investing style, and in his 1971 book The Battle for Stock Market Profits, he viewed the market as a battlefield. Loeb offered a contrarian investing viewpoint, in books and columns in Barron's, The Wall Street Journal, and Investor Magazine. Forbes magazine called Loeb "the most quoted man on Wall Street." He created the Gerald Loeb Award in order to foster further quality reporting for individual investors.

== The awards ==
The awards have been administered by the UCLA Anderson School of Management since 1973, and is sponsored by the G. and R. Loeb Foundation. It is regarded as: "business journalism's highest honor," and its "most prestigious." Beginning with just two winners in 1958 (Werner Renberg and David Steinberg) and expanding to three in the final years before the Anderson School began to administer the award, today there are ten categories in which prizes are awarded: large newspaper, medium newspaper, small newspaper, magazine, commentary, deadline or beat writing, wire services, and television. Those honored receive a cash prize of US$2,000, and are presented with the award at a ceremony in July of the year following their piece's publication. The preliminary judging committee includes business, financial and economic journalists, as well as faculty members from the UCLA Anderson School of Management. Once the finalists are selected, a final panel of judges consisting of representatives from major print and broadcast outlets selects a winner from each category. The final panel of judges is chaired by the dean of the UCLA Anderson School of Management. Entries are judged according to their originality, news value, writing quality, thoroughness and balance, and production value.

In 2017, Reena Ninan spoke onstage for UCLA's 60th Annual Gerald Loeb Awards for Distinguished Business and Financial Journalism. This was held at Capitale in New York City.

=== Award categories ===
Award categories varied over the years.

Category	Years awarded
Audio	2016–2023
Beat Reporting	2011–2023
Beat Writing	2001, 2003–2010
Blogging	2011–2012
Books	1974
Breaking News	2008–2023
Broadcast	2013
Broadcast Enterprise	2012
Business Book	2006–2012
Columns	1977
Columns/Editorial	1973–1976, 1978–1982
Commentary	1985–2023
Deadline and/or Beat Writing	1985–2000
Deadline or Beat Writing	2002
Deadline Writing	2003–2007
Editorial/Commentary	1983–1984
Editorials	1970–1972
Explanatory	2011–2023
Feature	2015–2023
Feature Writing	2007–2010
Gerald Loeb Memorial Award	1974–1978
Images/Graphics/Interactives	2016–2018
Images/Visuals	2013–2015
International	2013–2023
Investigative	2013–2023
Large Newspapers	1974–2014
Lifetime Achievement	1992–2023
Local	2015–2023
Magazines	1958–2014
Medium & Small Newspapers	2009–2012
Medium Newspapers	1987–2008
Minard Editor Award	2002–2023
Network and Large-Market Television	1997, 1999–2000
News or Wire Service	2002
News Services	2008–2014
News Services Online Content	2003–2007
Newspaper	1958–1973
Online	2008–2009, 2013–2014
Online Commentary and Blogging	2010
Online Enterprise	2011–2012
Other TV Markets	1997
Personal Finance	2010–2018
Personal Finance & Consumer Reporting	2020–2022, 2023
Personal Service	2019
Radio	1997, 1999–2001
Small Newspapers	1974–1983, 1985–2008
Small & Medium Newspapers	2013–2014
Special Award	1966, 1968–1970, 1972–1973, 1975–1976, 1983, 1985, 1987, 1994
Special Book Award	1969
Spot News	1983–1984
Television	2001–2002
Television Breaking News	2009–2010
Television Daily	2007–2008
Television Deadline	2005–2006
Television Enterprise	2006–2011
Television Long Form	2003–2004
Television Short Form	2003–2004
Video	2016–2023
Video/Audio	2014–2015
Visual Storytelling	2019–2023

== Winners ==
- List of Audio, Video, and Video/Audio winners
- List of Breaking News winners
- List of Broadcast and Broadcast Enterprise winners
- List of Books, Business Books, and Special Book Award winners
- List of Columns, Commentary, and Editorials winners
- List of Deadline and/or Beat Writing, Deadline or Beat Writing, Deadline Writing, Beat Writing, and Beat Reporting winners
- List of Explanatory winners
- List of Feature winners
- List of Gerald Loeb Memorial Award winners
- List of Images, Graphics, Interactives, and Visuals winners
- List of International winners
- List of Investigative winners
- List of Large Newspapers winners
- List of Lifetime Award winners
- List of Local winners
- List of Magazines winners
- List of Minard Editor Award winners
- List of Newspaper winners
- List of News Service, Online, and Blogging winners
- List of Personal Finance and Personal Service winners
- List of Radio winners
- List of Small and Medium Newspapers winners
- List of Special Award winners
- List of Spot News winners
- List of Television winners

== See also ==
- Business journalism
- Conscience-in-Media Award
- George Polk Awards
- Investigative journalism
- Worth Bingham Prize
