= Postchristianity =

Loss of Christianity's cultural dominance

Postchristianity is the situation in which Christianity is no longer the dominant civil religion of a society and has gradually assumed values, culture, and worldviews that are not necessarily Christian. Post-Christian tends to refer to the loss of Christianity's monopoly in historically Christian societies to atheism or secularism. It does not include formerly Christian societies that now mostly follow other religions like Islam, such as parts of the Balkans and the Middle East.

== Decline of Christianity ==
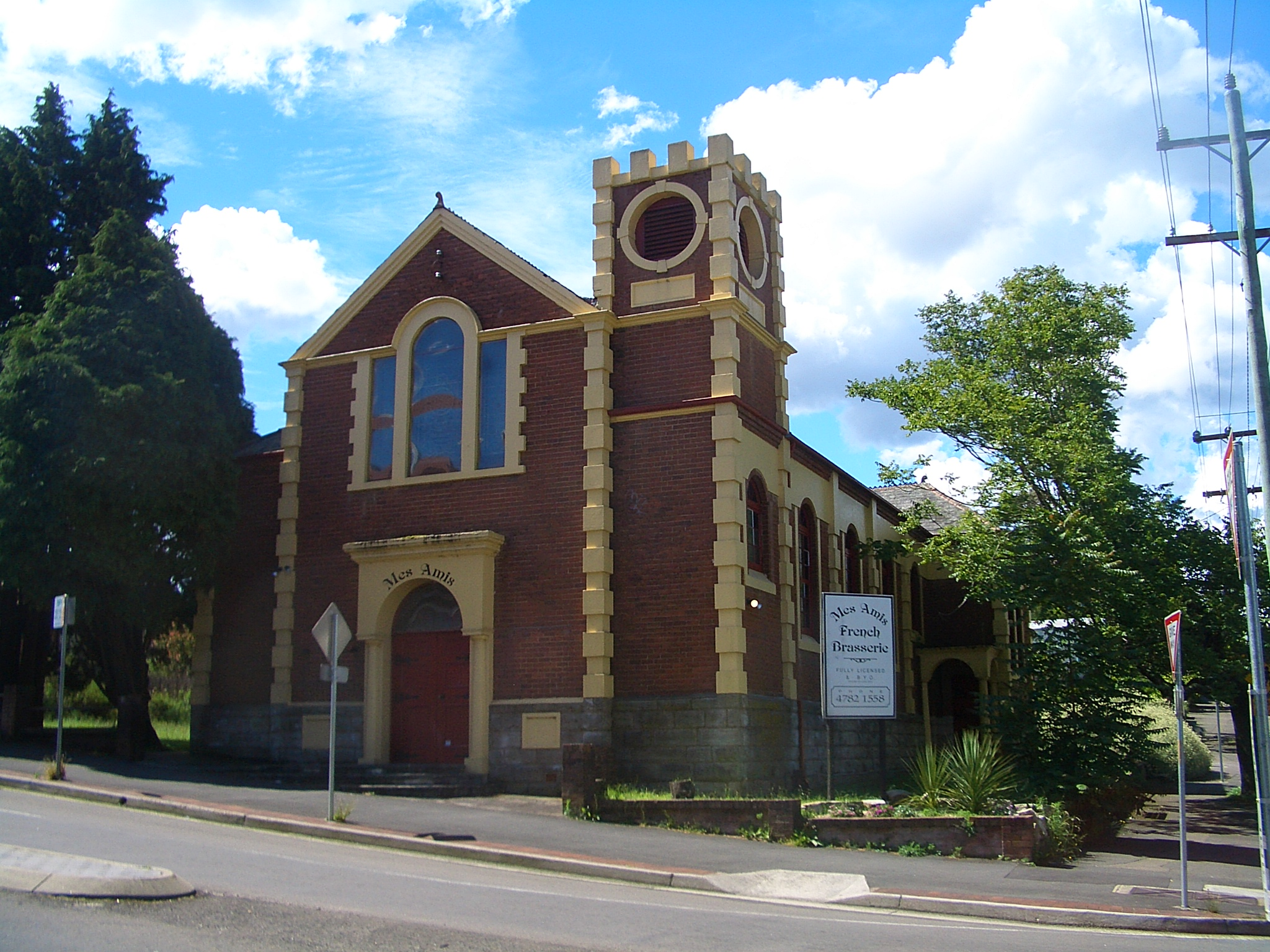
A deconsecrated church in Australia, now in use as a restaurant. Declining attendance can lead to the consolidation of congregations and repurposing of church buildings.

Historically, the majority of Christians have lived in Western nations, once called Christendom, and often conceptualized as "European Christian" civilization.

A post-Christian society is one in which Christianity is no longer the dominant civil religion but that has gradually assumed values, culture, and worldviews that are not necessarily Christian (and also may not necessarily reflect any world religion's standpoint or may represent a combination of either several religions or none). Post-Christian tends to refer to the loss of Christianity's monopoly, if not its followers, in historically Christian societies. Post-Christian societies are found across the Global North/West: for example, though the 2005 Eurobarometer survey indicated that the majority of Europeans hold some form of belief in a higher power (see also "ietsism"); fewer point explicitly to the Christian God.

Despite this decline, Christianity remains the dominant religion in Europe, the Americas and Oceania. According to a 2020 study by the Pew Research Center, 67% of the population of Europe, 63% of North America and 85% of Latin America and the Caribbean identified themselves as Christians. According to Scholars, in 2017, Europe's population was 77.8% Christian (up from 74.9% 1970), these changes were largely a result of the collapse of Communism and switching to Christianity in the former Soviet Union and Eastern Bloc countries.

In his 1961 book The Death of God, the French theologian Gabriel Vahanian argued that modern secular culture in most of Western civilization had lost all sense of the sacred, lacked any sacramental meaning, and disdained any transcendental purpose or sense of providence, bringing him to the conclusion that for the modern mind, "God is dead". Thomas J. J. Altizer and William Hamilton of Emory University drew upon a variety of sources, including the aphorisms of Dietrich Bonhoeffer's Letters and Papers from Prison, and brought this line of thought to public attention in a short-lived intellectual movement of the mid-to-late-1960s among Protestant theologians and ministerial students.

=== In public regional and world affairs ===
Postchristianity is the loss of the primacy of the Christian worldview in public affairs, especially in the Western world where Christianity had previously flourished, in favor of alternative worldviews such as secularism, nationalism, environmentalism, neopaganism, and organized (sometimes militant) atheism; as well as other ideologies that are no longer necessarily rooted in the language and assumptions of Christianity. They previously existed in an environment of ubiquitous Christianity (i.e. Christendom).

== Alternative perspectives ==
Other scholars have disputed the global decline of Christianity, and instead hypothesized of an evolution of Christianity which allows it to not only survive, but actively expand its influence in contemporary societies.

Philip Jenkins hypothesized a "Christian Revolution" in the Global South, such as Africa, Asia and Latin America, where instead of facing decline, Christianity is actively expanding. The susceptibility to Christian teachings in the Global South will allow the Christian population in these areas to continually increase, and together with the shrinking of the Western Christian population, will form a "new Christendom" in which the majority of the world's Christian population can be found in the South.

Charles Taylor, meanwhile, disputes the "God is dead" thesis by arguing that the practices and understandings of faith changed long before the late 20th century, along with secularism itself. In A Secular Age Taylor argues that being "free from Christendom" has allowed Christianity to endure and express itself in various ways, particularly in Western society; he notes that otherwise secular ideas were, and continue to be, formed in light of some manner of faith. He stresses that "loss of faith" reflects simplistic notions on the nature of secularization, namely the idea of "subtraction." Thus "post-Christian" is, after a fashion, a product of Christianity itself.

John Micklethwait and Adrian Wooldridge wrote God Is Back: How the Global Revival of Faith Is Changing the World, claiming that there is a global revival of faith that started in the late twentieth century.

== Other uses ==
Some American Christians (primarily Protestants) also use this term in reference to the evangelism of unchurched individuals who may have grown up in a non-Christian culture where traditional Biblical references may be unfamiliar concepts. This perspective argues that, among previous generations in the United States, such concepts and other artifacts of Christianese would have been common cultural knowledge and that it would not have been necessary to teach this language to adult converts to Christianity. In this sense, post-Christian is not used pejoratively, but is intended to describe the special remediative care that would be needed to introduce new Christians to the nuances of Christian life and practice.

Some groups use the term post-Christian as a self-description. Dana McLean Greeley, the first president of the Unitarian Universalist Association, described Unitarian Universalism as postchristian, insofar as Christians no longer considered it Christian, while persons of other religions would likely describe it as Christian, at least historically.

New religious movements such as Jesuism incorporate foundational elements of Christian thought in syncretic combination with various enlightenment beliefs (i.e. secular democracy, equality of historical minorities) into a coherent post-Christian theology.

== See also ==
- Apatheism
- Christian atheism
- Christian existentialism
- Cultural Christians
- Decline of Christianity in the Western world
- Postmodern Christianity
- Post-Western era
- Postmodern Reformation
- Post-theism
- Secular movement
- A New Christianity for a New World by John Shelby Spong
