= Classical liberalism =

Ideology supporting both civil and economic liberties

Classical liberalism (sometimes called English liberalism, and historically called Whiggism (Note: This term now refers to a specific school of classical liberalism (for which, see Whiggism).)) is a political philosophy and a branch of liberalism that advocates free market and laissez-faire economics and civil liberties under the rule of law, with special emphasis on individual autonomy, limited government, economic freedom, political freedom and freedom of speech. Classical liberalism, contrary to liberal branches like social liberalism or modern liberalism in the United States, looks more negatively on social policies, taxation and state involvement in the lives of individuals, and it advocates deregulation.

Until the Great Depression and the rise of social liberalism, classical liberalism was called economic liberalism. Later, the term was applied as a retronym, to distinguish earlier 19th-century liberalism from social liberalism. By modern standards, in the United States, the bare term liberalism often means social or progressive liberalism and is associated with the center-left, but in Europe and Australia, the bare term liberalism often means classical liberalism.

Classical liberalism developed in the early 18th century, building on ideas dating back to the 16th century, and was foundational to the American Revolution and the "American Project" more broadly. Notable liberal individuals whose ideas contributed to classical liberalism include John Locke, François Quesnay, Jean-Baptiste Say, Montesquieu, David Hume, Edward Gibbon, Denis Diderot, Voltaire, Jean-Jacques Rousseau, Marquis de Condorcet, Thomas Paine, Thomas Malthus, and David Ricardo. It drew on classical economics, especially the economic ideas espoused by Adam Smith in Book One of The Wealth of Nations, and on a belief in natural law. In contemporary times, Ayn Rand, Murray Rothbard, Friedrich Hayek, Milton Friedman, Ludwig von Mises, Thomas Sowell, Walter E. Williams, George Stigler, Larry Arnhart, Ronald Coase and James M. Buchanan are seen as the most prominent advocates of classical liberalism. However, other scholars have made reference to these contemporary thoughts as neoclassical liberalism, distinguishing them from 18th-century classical liberalism.

In its defense of economic liberties, classical liberalism may be described as right-wing, though classical liberals tend to reject the right's higher tolerance for economic protectionism. Conversely, in its defense of civil liberties, it has more in common with modern liberalism (the left), though classical liberalism tends to reject the left's inclination for collective group rights due to its central principle of individualism. Additionally, in the United States, classical liberalism is considered closely tied to, or synonymous with, American libertarianism.

== Evolution of core beliefs ==
Core beliefs of classical liberals included new ideas – which departed from both the older conservative idea of society as a family and from the later sociological concept of society as a complex set of social networks.

Classical liberals agreed with Thomas Hobbes that individuals created government to protect themselves from each other and to minimize conflict between individuals that would otherwise arise in a state of nature.

Drawing on ideas of Adam Smith, classical liberals believed that it was in the common interest that all individuals be able to secure their own economic self-interest. They were critical of what would come to be the idea of the welfare state as interfering in a free market. Despite Smith's resolute recognition of the importance and value of labour and of labourers, classical liberals criticized labour's group rights being pursued at the expense of individual rights while accepting corporations' rights, which led to inequality of bargaining power. Classical liberals argued that individuals should be free to obtain work from the highest-paying employers, while the profit motive would ensure that products that people desired were produced at prices they would pay. In a free market, both labour and capital would receive the greatest possible reward, while production would be organized efficiently to meet consumer demand. Classical liberals argued for what they called a minimal state and government, limited to the following functions:

- Laws to protect citizens from wrongs committed against them by other citizens, which included protection of individual rights, private property, enforcement of contracts and common law.
- A common national defence to provide protection against foreign invaders.
- Public works and services that cannot be provided in a free market such as a stable currency, standard weights and measures and building and upkeep of roads, canals, harbours, railways, communications and postal services.

Classical liberals asserted that rights are of a negative nature and therefore stipulate that other individuals and governments are to refrain from interfering with the free market, opposing social liberals who assert that individuals have positive rights, such as the right to vote, the right to an education, the right to healthcare, and the right to a minimum wage. For society to guarantee positive rights, it requires taxation over and above the minimum needed to enforce negative rights.

Core beliefs of classical liberals did not necessarily include democracy nor government by a majority vote by citizens because "there is nothing in the bare idea of majority rule to show that majorities will always respect the rights of property or maintain rule of law". For example, James Madison argued for a constitutional republic with protections for individual liberty over a pure democracy, reasoning that in a pure democracy a "common passion or interest will, in almost every case, be felt by a majority of the whole ... and there is nothing to check the inducements to sacrifice the weaker party".

In the late 19th century, classical liberalism developed into neoclassical liberalism, which argued for government to be as small as possible to allow the exercise of individual freedom. In its most extreme form, neoclassical liberalism advocated social Darwinism. Right-libertarianism is a modern form of neoclassical liberalism. However, Edwin Van de Haar states although classical liberal thought influenced libertarianism, there are significant differences between them. Classical liberalism refuses to give priority to liberty over order and therefore does not exhibit the hostility to the state which is the defining feature of libertarianism. As such, right-libertarians believe classical liberals do not have enough respect for individual property rights and lack sufficient trust in the free market's workings and spontaneous order leading to their support of a much larger state. Right-libertarians also disagree with classical liberals as being too supportive of central banks and monetarist policies.

=== Typology of beliefs ===
Friedrich Hayek identified two different traditions within classical liberalism, namely the British tradition and the French tradition:

- The British philosophers Bernard Mandeville, David Hume, Edmund Burke, Adam Smith, Adam Ferguson, Josiah Tucker and William Paley held beliefs in empiricism, the common law and in traditions and institutions which had spontaneously evolved but were imperfectly understood.
- The French philosophers Voltaire, Jean-Jacques Rousseau, Denis Diderot, Maximilien Robespierre, Louis Antoine de Saint-Just, Marquis de Condorcet, the Encyclopedists and the Physiocrats believed in rationalism and sometimes showed hostility to tradition and religion.

Hayek conceded that the national labels did not exactly correspond to those belonging to each tradition since he saw the Frenchmen Montesquieu, Benjamin Constant, Joseph De Maistre and Alexis de Tocqueville as belonging to the British tradition and the British Thomas Hobbes, Joseph Priestley, Richard Price, Edward Gibbon, Benjamin Franklin, Thomas Jefferson and Thomas Paine as belonging to the French tradition. Hayek also rejected the label laissez-faire as originating from the French tradition and alien to the beliefs of Hume and Smith.

Guido De Ruggiero also identified differences between "Montesquieu and Rousseau, the English and the democratic types of liberalism" and argued that there was a "profound contrast between the two Liberal systems". He claimed that the spirit of "authentic English Liberalism" had "built up its work piece by piece without ever destroying what had once been built, but basing upon it every new departure". This liberalism had "insensibly adapted ancient institutions to modern needs" and "instinctively recoiled from all abstract proclamations of principles and rights". Ruggiero claimed that this liberalism was challenged by what he called the "new Liberalism of France" that was characterised by egalitarianism and a "rationalistic consciousness".

In 1848, Francis Lieber distinguished between what he called "Anglican and Gallican Liberty". Lieber asserted that "independence in the highest degree, compatible with safety and broad national guarantees of liberty, is the great aim of Anglican liberty, and self-reliance is the chief source from which it draws its strength". On the other hand, Gallican liberty "is sought in government ... . [T]he French look for the highest degree of political civilisation in organisation, that is, in the highest degree of interference by public power".

== History ==
=== Great Britain ===
French physiocracy heavily influenced British classical liberalism, which traces its roots to the Whigs and Radicals. Whiggery had become a dominant ideology following the Glorious Revolution of 1688 and was associated with supporting the British Parliament, upholding the rule of law, defending landed property and sometimes included freedom of the press and freedom of speech. The origins of rights were seen as being in an ancient constitution existing from time immemorial. Custom rather than as natural rights justified these rights. Whigs believed that executive power had to be constrained. While they supported limited suffrage, they saw voting as a privilege rather than as a right. However, there was no consistency in Whig ideology and diverse writers including John Locke, David Hume, Adam Smith and Edmund Burke were all influential among Whigs, although none of them were universally accepted.

From the 1790s to the 1820s, British radicals concentrated on parliamentary and electoral reform, emphasising natural rights and popular sovereignty. Richard Price and Joseph Priestley adapted the language of Locke to the ideology of radicalism. The radicals saw parliamentary reform as a first step toward dealing with their many grievances, including the treatment of Protestant Dissenters, the slave trade, high prices, and high taxes. There was greater unity among classical liberals than there had been among Whigs. Classical liberals were committed to individualism, liberty, and equal rights, as well as some other important tenants of leftism, since classical liberalism was introduced in the late 18th century as a leftist movement. They believed these goals required a free economy with minimal government interference. Some elements of Whiggery were uncomfortable with the commercial nature of classical liberalism. These elements became associated with conservatism.

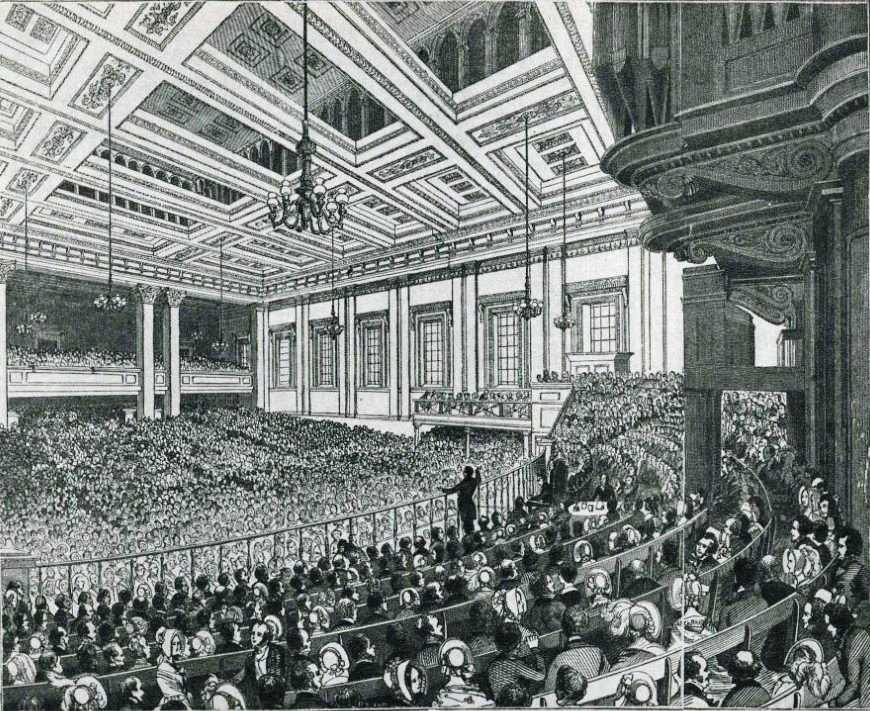
A meeting of the Anti-Corn Law League in Exeter Hall in 1846

Classical liberalism was the dominant political theory in Britain from the early 19th century until the First World War. Its notable victories were the Roman Catholic Relief Act 1829, the Reform Act 1832 and the repeal of the Corn Laws in 1846. The Anti-Corn Law League brought together a coalition of liberal and radical groups in support of free trade under the leadership of Richard Cobden and John Bright, who opposed aristocratic privilege, militarism, and public expenditure and believed that the backbone of Great Britain was the yeoman farmer. Their policies of low public expenditure and low taxation were adopted by William Gladstone when he became Chancellor of the Exchequer and later Prime Minister. Classical liberalism was often associated with religious dissent and nonconformism.

Although classical liberals aspired to a minimum of state activity, they accepted the principle of government intervention in the economy from the early 19th century on, with passage of the Factory Acts. From around 1840 to 1860, laissez-faire advocates of the Manchester School and writers in The Economist were confident that their early victories would lead to a period of expanding economic and personal liberty and world peace, but would face reversals as government intervention and activity continued to expand from the 1850s. Jeremy Bentham and James Mill, although advocates of laissez-faire, non-intervention in foreign affairs, and individual liberty, believed that social institutions could be rationally redesigned through the principles of utilitarianism. The Conservative Prime Minister Benjamin Disraeli rejected classical liberalism altogether and advocated Tory democracy. By the 1870s, Herbert Spencer and other classical liberals concluded that historical development was turning against them. By the First World War, the Liberal Party had largely abandoned classical liberal principles.

The changing economic and social conditions of the 19th century led to a division between neo-classical and social (or welfare) liberals, who while agreeing on the importance of individual liberty differed on the role of the state. Neo-classical liberals, who called themselves "true liberals", saw Locke's Second Treatise as the best guide and emphasised "limited government" while social liberals supported government regulation and the welfare state. Herbert Spencer in Britain and William Graham Sumner were the leading neo-classical liberal theorists of the 19th century. The evolution from classical to social/welfare liberalism is for example reflected in Britain in the evolution of the thought of John Maynard Keynes.

Helena Vieira, writing for the London School of Economics, argued that classical liberalism "may contradict some fundamental democratic principles as they are inconsistent with the principle of unanimity (also known as the Pareto Principle) – the idea that if everyone in society prefers a policy A to a policy B, then the former should be adopted."

=== Ottoman Empire ===
The Ottoman Empire had liberal free trade policies by the 18th century, with origins in capitulations of the Ottoman Empire, dating back to the first commercial treaties signed with France in 1536 and taken further with capitulations in 1673, in 1740 which lowered duties to only 3% for imports and exports and in 1790. Ottoman free trade policies were praised by British economists advocating free trade such as J. R. McCulloch in his Dictionary of Commerce (1834) but criticized by British politicians opposing free trade such as Prime Minister Benjamin Disraeli, who cited the Ottoman Empire as "an instance of the injury done by unrestrained competition" in the 1846 Corn Laws debate, arguing that it destroyed what had been "some of the finest manufactures of the world" in 1812.

=== United States ===
In the United States, liberalism took a strong root because it had little opposition to its ideals, whereas in Europe liberalism was opposed by many reactionary or feudal interests such as the nobility; the aristocracy, including army officers; the landed gentry; and the established church. Thomas Jefferson adopted many of the ideals of liberalism, but in the Declaration of Independence changed Locke's "life, liberty and property" to the more socially liberal "Life, Liberty and the pursuit of Happiness". As the United States grew, industry became a larger and larger part of American life; and during the term of its first populist President, Andrew Jackson, economic questions came to the forefront. The economic ideas of the Jacksonian era were almost universally the ideas of classical liberalism. Freedom, according to classical liberals, was maximised when the government took a "hands off" attitude toward the economy. Historian Kathleen G. Donohue argues:

[A]t the center of classical liberal theory [in Europe] was the idea of laissez-faire. To the vast majority of American classical liberals, however, laissez-faire did not mean no government intervention at all. On the contrary, they were more than willing to see government provide tariffs, railroad subsidies, and internal improvements, all of which benefited producers. What they condemned was intervention on behalf of consumers.

The Nation magazine espoused liberalism every week starting in 1865 under the influential editor Edwin Lawrence Godkin (1831–1902). The ideas of classical liberalism remained essentially unchallenged until a series of depressions, thought to be impossible according to the tenets of classical economics, led to economic hardship from which the voters demanded relief. In the words of William Jennings Bryan, "You shall not crucify this nation on a cross of gold". Classical liberalism remained the orthodox belief among American businessmen until the Great Depression. The Great Depression in the United States saw a sea change in liberalism, with priority shifting from the producers to consumers. Franklin D. Roosevelt's New Deal represented the dominance of modern liberalism in politics for decades. In the words of Arthur Schlesinger Jr.:

When the growing complexity of industrial conditions required increasing government intervention in order to assure more equal opportunities, the liberal tradition, faithful to the goal rather than to the dogma, altered its view of the state. ... There emerged the conception of a social welfare state, in which the national government had the express obligation to maintain high levels of employment in the economy, to supervise standards of life and labour, to regulate the methods of business competition, and to establish comprehensive patterns of social security.

Alan Wolfe summarizes the viewpoint that there is a continuous liberal understanding that includes both Adam Smith and John Maynard Keynes:

The idea that liberalism comes in two forms assumes that the most fundamental question facing mankind is how much government intervenes into the economy. ... When instead we discuss human purpose and the meaning of life, Adam Smith and John Maynard Keynes are on the same side. Both of them possessed an expansive sense of what we are put on this earth to accomplish. ... For Smith, mercantilism was the enemy of human liberty. For Keynes, monopolies were. It makes perfect sense for an eighteenth-century thinker to conclude that humanity would flourish under the market. For a twentieth century thinker committed to the same ideal, government was an essential tool to the same end.

The view that modern liberalism is a continuation of classical liberalism is controversial and disputed by many. James Kurth, Robert E. Lerner, John Micklethwait, Adrian Wooldridge and several other political scholars have argued that classical liberalism still exists today, but in the form of American conservatism. According to Deepak Lal, only in the United States does classical liberalism continue to be a significant political force through American conservatism. American libertarians also claim to be the true continuation of the classical liberal tradition.

Tadd Wilson, writing for the libertarian Foundation for Economic Education, noted that "Many on the left and right criticize classical liberals for focusing purely on economics and politics to the neglect of a vital issue: culture."

== Intellectual sources ==
=== John Locke ===
Central to classical liberal ideology was their interpretation of John Locke's Second Treatise of Government and A Letter Concerning Toleration, which had been written as a defence of the Glorious Revolution of 1688. Although these writings were considered too radical at the time for Britain's new rulers, Whigs, radicals and supporters of the American Revolution later came to cite them. However, much of later liberal thought was absent in Locke's writings or scarcely mentioned and his writings have been subject to various interpretations. For example, there is little mention of constitutionalism, the separation of powers and limited government.

James L. Richardson identified five central themes in Locke's writing:

- Individualism
- Consent
- Rule of law and government as trustee
- Significance of property
- Religious toleration

Although Locke did not develop a theory of natural rights, he envisioned individuals in the state of nature as being free and equal. The individual, rather than the community or institutions, was the point of reference. Locke believed that individuals had given consent to government and therefore authority derived from the people rather than from above. This belief would influence later revolutionary movements.

As a trustee, government was expected to serve the interests of the people, not the rulers; and rulers were expected to follow the laws enacted by legislatures. Locke also held that the main purpose of men uniting into commonwealths and governments was for the preservation of their property. Despite the ambiguity of Locke's definition of property, which limited property to "as much land as a man tills, plants, improves, cultivates, and can use the product of", this principle held great appeal to individuals possessed of great wealth.

Locke held that the individual had the right to follow his own religious beliefs and that the state should not impose a religion against Dissenters, but there were limitations. No tolerance should be shown for atheists, who were seen as amoral, or to Catholics, who were seen as owing allegiance to the Pope over their own national government.

=== Adam Smith ===
Adam Smith's The Wealth of Nations, published in 1776, was to provide most of the ideas of economics, at least until the publication of John Stuart Mill's Principles of Political Economy in 1848. Smith addressed the motivation for economic activity, the causes of prices and the distribution of wealth and the policies the state should follow to maximise wealth.

Smith wrote that as long as supply, demand, prices and competition were left free of government regulation, the pursuit of material self-interest, rather than altruism, would maximise the wealth of a society through profit-driven production of goods and services. An "invisible hand" directed individuals and firms to work toward the public good as an unintended consequence of efforts to maximise their own gain. This provided a moral justification for the accumulation of wealth, which had previously been viewed by some as sinful.

He assumed that workers could be paid wages as low as was necessary for their survival, which was later transformed by David Ricardo and Thomas Robert Malthus into the "iron law of wages". His main emphasis was on the benefit of free internal and international trade, which he thought could increase wealth through specialisation in production. He also opposed restrictive trade preferences, state grants of monopolies and employers' organisations and trade unions. Government should be limited to defence, public works and the administration of justice, financed by taxes based on income.

Smith's economics was carried into practice in the nineteenth century with the lowering of tariffs in the 1820s, the repeal of the Poor Relief Act that had restricted the mobility of labour in 1834 and the end of the rule of the East India Company over India in 1858.

=== Classical economics ===
In addition to Smith's legacy, Say's law, Thomas Robert Malthus' theories of population and David Ricardo's iron law of wages became central doctrines of classical economics. The pessimistic nature of these theories provided a basis for criticism of capitalism by its opponents and helped perpetuate the tradition of calling economics the "dismal science".

Jean-Baptiste Say was a French economist who introduced Smith's economic theories into France and whose commentaries on Smith were read in both France and Britain. Say challenged Smith's labour theory of value, believing that prices were determined by utility and also emphasised the critical role of the entrepreneur in the economy. However, neither of those observations became accepted by British economists at the time. His most important contribution to economic thinking was Say's law, which was interpreted by classical economists that there could be no overproduction in a market and that there would always be a balance between supply and demand. This general belief influenced government policies until the 1930s. Following this law, since the economic cycle was seen as self-correcting, government did not intervene during periods of economic hardship because it was seen as futile.

Malthus wrote two books, An Essay on the Principle of Population (published in 1798) and Principles of Political Economy (published in 1820). The second book which was a rebuttal of Say's law had little influence on contemporary economists. However, his first book became a major influence on classical liberalism. In that book, Malthus claimed that population growth would outstrip food production because population grew geometrically while food production grew arithmetically. As people were provided with food, they would reproduce until their growth outstripped the food supply. Nature would then provide a check to growth in the forms of vice and misery. No gains in income could prevent this and any welfare for the poor would be self-defeating. The poor were in fact responsible for their own problems which could have been avoided through self-restraint.

Ricardo, who was an admirer of Smith, covered many of the same topics, but while Smith drew conclusions from broadly empirical observations he used deduction, drawing conclusions by reasoning from basic assumptions. While Ricardo accepted Smith's labour theory of value, he acknowledged that utility could influence the price of some rare items. Rents on agricultural land were seen as the production that was surplus to the subsistence required by the tenants. Wages were seen as the amount required for workers' subsistence and to maintain current population levels. According to his iron law of wages, wages could never rise beyond subsistence levels. Ricardo explained profits as a return on capital, which itself was the product of labour, but a conclusion many drew from his theory was that profit was a surplus appropriated by capitalists to which they were not entitled.

=== Utilitarianism ===
The central concept of utilitarianism, which was developed by Jeremy Bentham, was that public policy should seek to provide "the greatest happiness of the greatest number". While this could be interpreted as a justification for state action to reduce poverty, it was used by classical liberals to justify inaction with the argument that the net benefit to all individuals would be higher.

Utilitarianism provided British governments with the political justification to implement economic liberalism, which was to dominate economic policy from the 1830s. Although utilitarianism prompted legislative and administrative reform and John Stuart Mill's later writings on the subject foreshadowed the welfare state, it was mainly used as a justification for laissez-faire.

== Political economy ==
Classical liberals following Mill saw utility as the foundation for public policies. This broke both with conservative "tradition" and Lockean "natural rights", which were seen as irrational. Utility, which emphasises the happiness of individuals, became the central ethical value of all Mill-style liberalism. Although utilitarianism inspired wide-ranging reforms, it became primarily a justification for laissez-faire economics. However, Mill adherents rejected Smith's belief that the "invisible hand" would lead to general benefits and embraced Malthus' view that population expansion would prevent any general benefit and Ricardo's view of the inevitability of class conflict. Laissez-faire was seen as the only possible economic approach and any government intervention was seen as useless and harmful. The Poor Law Amendment Act 1834 was defended on "scientific or economic principles" while the authors of the Poor Relief Act 1601 were seen as not having had the benefit of reading Malthus.

However, commitment to laissez-faire was not uniform and some economists advocated state support of public works and education. Classical liberals were also divided on free trade as Ricardo expressed doubt that the removal of grain tariffs advocated by Richard Cobden and the Anti-Corn Law League would have any general benefits. Most classical liberals also supported legislation to regulate the number of hours that children were allowed to work and usually did not oppose factory reform legislation.

Despite the pragmatism of classical economists, their views were expressed in dogmatic terms by such popular writers as Jane Marcet and Harriet Martineau. The strongest defender of laissez-faire was The Economist founded by James Wilson in 1843. The Economist criticised Ricardo for his lack of support for free trade and expressed hostility to welfare, believing that the lower orders were responsible for their economic circumstances. The Economist took the position that regulation of factory hours was harmful to workers and also strongly opposed state support for education, health, the provision of water, and granting of patents and copyrights.

The Economist also campaigned against the Corn Laws that protected landlords in the United Kingdom of Great Britain and Ireland against competition from less expensive foreign imports of cereal products. A rigid belief in laissez-faire guided the government response in 1846–1849 to the Great Famine in Ireland, during which an estimated 1.5 million people died. The minister responsible for economic and financial affairs, Charles Wood, expected that private enterprise and free trade, rather than government intervention, would alleviate the famine. The Corn Laws were finally repealed in 1846 by the removal of tariffs on grain which kept the price of bread artificially high, but it came too late to stop the Irish famine, partly because it was done in stages over three years.

Many classical liberal theorists were skeptical of democracy, believing that poor, uneducated people were not capable of governing and they might vote against economically liberal principles. The skepticism about self-governance was even more pronounced when it came to "uncivilized", non-European societies, with many classical liberal thinkers providing intellectual justifications for white supremacy, colonial rule, and the destruction of native societies via settler colonialism.

=== Free trade and world peace ===
Several liberals, including Smith and Cobden, argued that the free exchange of goods between nations could lead to world peace. Erik Gartzke states: "Scholars like Montesquieu, Adam Smith, Richard Cobden, Norman Angell, and Richard Rosecrance have long speculated that free markets have the potential to free states from the looming prospect of recurrent warfare". American political scientists John R. Oneal and Bruce M. Russett, well known for their work on the democratic peace theory, state:

The classical liberals advocated policies to increase liberty and prosperity. They sought to empower the commercial class politically and to abolish royal charters, monopolies, and the protectionist policies of mercantilism so as to encourage entrepreneurship and increase productive efficiency. They also expected democracy and laissez-faire economics to diminish the frequency of war.

In The Wealth of Nations, Smith argued that as societies progressed from hunter gatherers to industrial societies the spoils of war would rise, but that the costs of war would rise further and thus making war difficult and costly for industrialised nations:

[T]he honours, the fame, the emoluments of war, belong not to [the middle and industrial classes]; the battle-plain is the harvest field of the aristocracy, watered with the blood of the people. ... Whilst our trade rested upon our foreign dependencies, as was the case in the middle of the last century...force and violence, were necessary to command our customers for our manufacturers...But war, although the greatest of consumers, not only produces nothing in return, but, by abstracting labour from productive employment and interrupting the course of trade, it impedes, in a variety of indirect ways, the creation of wealth; and, should hostilities be continued for a series of years, each successive war-loan will be felt in our commercial and manufacturing districts with an augmented pressure

— Richard Cobden

[B]y virtue of their mutual interest does nature unite people against violence and war, for the concept of cosmopolitan right does not protect them from it. The spirit of trade cannot coexist with war, and sooner or later this spirit dominates every people. For among all those powers (or means) that belong to a nation, financial power may be the most reliable in forcing nations to pursue the noble cause of peace (though not from moral motives); and wherever in the world war threatens to break out, they will try to head it off through mediation, just as if they were permanently leagued for this purpose.

— Immanuel Kant

Cobden believed that military expenditures worsened the welfare of the state and benefited a small, but concentrated elite minority, summing up British imperialism, which he believed was the result of the economic restrictions of mercantilist policies. To Cobden and many classical liberals, those who advocated peace must also advocate free markets. The belief that free trade would promote peace was widely shared by English liberals of the 19th and early 20th century, leading the economist John Maynard Keynes (1883–1946), who was a classical liberal in his early life, to say that this was a doctrine on which he was "brought up" and which he held unquestioned only until the 1920s. In his review of a book on Keynes, Michael S. Lawlor argues that it may be in large part due to Keynes' contributions in economics and politics, as in the implementation of the Marshall Plan and the way economies have been managed since his work, "that we have the luxury of not facing his unpalatable choice between free trade and full employment". A related manifestation of this idea was the argument of Norman Angell (1872–1967), most famously before World War I in The Great Illusion (1909), that the interdependence of the economies of the major powers was now so great that war between them was futile and irrational; and therefore unlikely.

== Classical liberal parties worldwide ==
While general libertarian, (Note: E.g., the U.S. Libertarian Party or KORWiN.) liberal-conservative, (Note: E.g., the Christian Democratic Union of Germany or Les Républicains.) and some right-wing populist (Note: E.g., the People's Party of Canada or the Norwegian Progress Party.) political parties are also included in classical liberal parties in a broad sense, only general classical liberal parties such as Germany's FDP, Denmark's Liberal Alliance and Thailand Democrat Party should be listed.

=== Classical liberal parties or parties with classical liberal factions ===
- Argentina: Republican Proposal, Liberty Advances,
- Australia: Liberal Party of Australia, Libertarian Party
- Austria: NEOS – The New Austria and Liberal Forum, Freedom Party of Austria (factions)
- Belgium: Anders, Reformist Movement
- Brazil: New Party
- Canada: Conservative Party (factions), Libertarian Party, People's Party
- Chile: Evópoli
- Denmark: Venstre, Moderates, Liberal Alliance
- Estonia: Estonian Reform Party
- Finland: Liberal Party – Freedom to Choose
- France: Renaissance
- Georgia: Federalists, Girchi – More Freedom, Party of The Free
- Germany: Free Democratic Party
- Iceland: Viðreisn
- India: Lok Satta Party, Swatantra Bharat Paksh
- Israel: Likud (factions)
- Latvia: For Latvia's Development, Movement For!
- Lithuania: Liberals' Movement
- Luxembourg: Democratic Party
- Netherlands: People's Party for Freedom and Democracy, Belang van Nederland
- New Zealand: New Zealand National Party, ACT New Zealand
- Norway: Venstre, Progress Party
- Poland: Civic Coalition
- Portugal: Liberal Initiative, Social Democratic Party
- Romania: National Liberal Party
- Russia: Yabloko
- Serbia: Liberal Democratic Party of Serbia
- Slovakia: Freedom and Solidarity
- South Africa: Democratic Alliance, ActionSA
- Spain: Citizens, People's Party
- Sweden: Liberals, Classical Liberal Party, Moderate Party
- Switzerland: FDP.The Liberals
- Thailand: Democrat Party
- Turkey: Liberal Democratic Party
- United Kingdom: Conservative Party (factions), Liberal Democrats (factions), Liberal Party,
- United States: Liberal Party USA, Libertarian Party
- Venezuela: Come Venezuela

=== Historical classical liberal parties or parties with classical liberal factions (since 1900s) ===
- Belgium: Liberal Party, Party for Freedom and Progress, Liberal Reformist Party
- Chile: Liberal Party, Amplitude
- Germany: German Democratic Party
- India: Swatantra Party, Indian Liberal Party
- Ireland: Progressive Democrats
- Israel: General Zionists, Israeli Liberal Party
- Japan: Liberal Party (1998), Liberal League
- Netherlands: Freedom Party
- New Zealand: New Zealand Liberal Party, United Party, New Zealand Party
- Poland: Modern
- Russia: PARNAS
- South Korea: New Democratic Party
- Switzerland: Free Democratic Party of Switzerland, Liberal Party of Switzerland
- United Kingdom: Liberal Party

== See also ==
- Age of Enlightenment
- Austrian School
- Bourbon Democrat
  - National Democratic Party
- Classical economics
- Cultural liberalism
- Classical radicalism
  - Modern liberalism
- Classical republicanism
- Constitutionalism
- Constitutional liberalism
- Conservative liberalism
- Corporate liberalism
- Economic liberalism
- Fiscal conservatism
- Friedrich Naumann Foundation
- Georgism
- Gladstonian liberalism
- Jeffersonian democracy
- Liberal conservatism
- Liberal democracy
- Liberalism in Europe
- Libertarianism
  - Left-libertarianism
  - Right-libertarianism
- List of liberal theorists
- Neoclassical liberalism
- Neoliberalism
- Night-watchman state
- Opportunist Republicans
- Orléanist
- Physiocracy
- Political individualism
- Rule of law
- Separation of powers
- Whig history

== Sources ==
- Conway, David (2008). "Liberalism, Classical". In Hamowy, Ronald (ed.). The Encyclopedia of Libertarianism. Thousand Oaks, CA: Sage; Cato Institute. pp. 295–298. doi:10.4135/9781412965811.n179. ISBN 978-1-4129-6580-4. LCCN 2008009151. OCLC 750831024. Archived from the original on 9 January 2023.
- De Ruggiero, Guido (1959). The History of European Liberalism. Boston: Beacon Press.
- Dickerson, M. O.; Flanagan, Thomas; O'Neill, Brenda (2009). An Introduction to Government and Politics: A Conceptual Approach. Cengage Learning. ISBN 978-0-17-650042-9.
- Gray, John (1995). Liberalism. Minneapolis: University of Minnesota Press. ISBN 0-8166-2800-9.
- Heywood, Andrew (2004). Political Theory, Third Edition: An Introduction. Palgrave Macmillan. ISBN 0-333-96180-3.
- Hunt, E. K. (2003). Property and Prophets: The Evolution of Economic Institutions and Ideologies. New York: M. E. Sharpe, Inc. ISBN 0-7656-0608-9.
- Ishiyama, John T.; Breuning, Marijike (2010). 21st Century Political Science: A Reference Handbook. Vol. 1. London: Sage Publications. ISBN 978-1-4129-6901-7.
- Lieber, Francis (1881). The Miscellaneous Writings of Francis Lieber, Volume II: Contributions to Political Science. Philadelphia: J. B. Lippincott & Co.
- Mills, John (2002). A Critical History of Economics. Basingstoke, England: Palgrave Macmillan. ISBN 0-333-97130-2.
- Richardson, James L. (2001). Contending Liberalisms in World Politics: Ideology and Power. Boulder, Colorado: Lynne Rienner Publishers. ISBN 1-55587-939-X.
- Turner, Rachel S. (2008). Neo-Liberal Ideology: History, Concepts and Policies: History, Concepts and Policies. Edinburgh: Edinburgh University Press. ISBN 978-0-7486-3235-0.
- Van de Haar, Edwin (2015). Degrees of Freedom: Liberal Political Philosophy and Ideology. New Brunswick, NJ: Transaction Publishers. ISBN 978-1-4128-5575-4.
- Vincent, Andrew (2009). Modern Political Ideologies (Third ed.). Chichester, England: Wiley-Blackwell. ISBN 978-1-4051-5495-6.
- Wooldridge, Adrian (2026). The Revolutionary Center: The Lost Genius of Liberalism. Pegasus Books. ISBN 978-1639369379.
