= Capitalism in America =

2018 book by Alan Greenspan and Adrian Wooldridge

Capitalism in America: A History
- Cover of the first edition (hardcover)
- Author: Alan Greenspan; Adrian Wooldridge
- Audio read by: Ray Porter
- Cover artist: Colin Campbell Cooper
- Language: English
- Subjects: Capitalism; Economic history of the United States
- Publisher: Penguin Press
- Publication date: October 16, 2018
- Publication place: United States
- Media type: Print (hardcover, paperback); Digital (ebook, audiobook)
- Pages: 486
- ISBN: 978-0-7352-2244-1
- OCLC: 1099606050
- Dewey Decimal: 330.973
- LC Class: HB501 .G6454 2018

Capitalism in America: A History is a 2018 book written by former chairman of the Federal Reserve Alan Greenspan and Adrian Wooldridge, political editor at The Economist. (Note: In the paperback and eBook versions, the book is titled: Capitalism in America: An Economic History of the United States.) The book traces the economic history of the United States since its founding and the authors argue that America's embrace of capitalism and creative destruction has given the nation's economy a superior edge.

Shortlisted for the 2018 Financial Times and McKinsey Business Book of the Year Award, Capitalism in America received generally positive reviews from critics. It was applauded for its engaging and accessible writing style but critiqued for its one-sidedness.

== Background ==
At age 92, Alan Greenspan co-wrote Capitalism in America during a period of economic recovery, growing deficits, rising costs of entitlement programs, inflation, populism, and China's growing economic dominance. During his tenure as the Federal Reserve chair, Greenspan preceded over a period of economic prosperity and was seen as a "rock star" by investors, politicians, and other central bankers, but his reputation worsened following the 2008 financial crisis. Adrian Wooldridge is the political editor at The Economist and author of nine previous books. He previously wrote the Schumpeter column and currently writes the Bagehot column at The Economist. The book was written during a time where capitalism was viewed unfavorably among American millennials.

== Content ==
The book traces the economic history of the United States from the Founding Fathers to the election of Donald Trump and provides a case in favor of capitalism.

The three major themes of the book include productivity (output per hours worked), creative destruction, and politics. Creative destruction—a term coined by political economist Joseph Schumpeter in his 1942 book Capitalism, Socialism and Democracy—is defined as the "process of industrial mutation…that incessantly revolutionizes the economic structure from within, incessantly destroying the old one, incessantly creating a new one." In Greenspan's words, creative destruction "is the process by which people do two things: they continuously invest, but the investment is displacing older equipment. But more importantly, it engenders unemployment, and it's the process which unfortunately is a necessary condition for growth and standards of living."

The authors' thesis is that America (more than any other nation) was willing to embrace creative destruction, thus allowing the country to be reborn or reconfigured multiple times. As a result of this embrace, America, for example, produces 25% of the world's GDP despite being only 5% of the global population and accumulates 20% of newly registered patents per year.

A chart showing the rise of GDP per capita in America, indicating a higher standard of living

The increase in granted U.S. utility patents suggests greater innovation.

=== Summary ===
The book starts out with a thought experiment: imagining if the World Economic Forum in Davos was held in 1620 and the superpowers during that time speculating which nation will dominate in the future.

The authors begin to describe a post-1776 American economy, a land abundant with natural resources and alternating boom-and-bust cycles. The authors emphasize the difference between the agrarian, slave-holding states in the South and the Northern industrial states.

Following the Civil War, the authors write about the surge of immigrants in America and express admiration for various business tycoons such as Andrew Carnegie and John D. Rockefeller: "These great entrepreneurs earned their place in history not by inventing new things but by organizing them."

During the Progressive Era, the authors write about trust-busting, the creation of the Federal Reserve System, female suffrage, and other aspects of that period. The authors lament ballooning consumer debt and restrictive immigration laws.

Next, the authors speak of the causes of the Great Depression (such as the Smoot–Hawley Act) and criticize the leadership of FDR. The authors contend that the New Deal centralized power in Washington by creating numerous new alphabet agencies and unfunded social security entitlements. The authors believe the Great Depression ended with the massive military production during World War II.

After the end of the war, the authors attribute America's golden age to presidents Truman and Eisenhower and, in particular, applaud Eisenhower's formation of the Interstate Highway System. The authors view the Johnson administration as the precursor to the stagflation of the 1970s.

The authors assert that the "Age of Optimism" began with the inauguration of Ronald Reagan, who implemented union-busting, deregulation, and mass tax cuts during his tenure. However, the authors criticize Reagan for tripling the nominal national debt. They give praise to Bill Clinton for reducing the debt and implementing welfare reform. The book delves into the rise of Silicon Valley and the origins of Apple, Google, and other major tech corporations.

In the book's account of the 2008 financial crisis, the authors blame the crash on the growth of derivatives and securitization combined with subprime mortgages in a financially complacent environment. Greenspan counterargues that his Fed's low-interest rates in 2003-2005 contributed to the housing bubble.

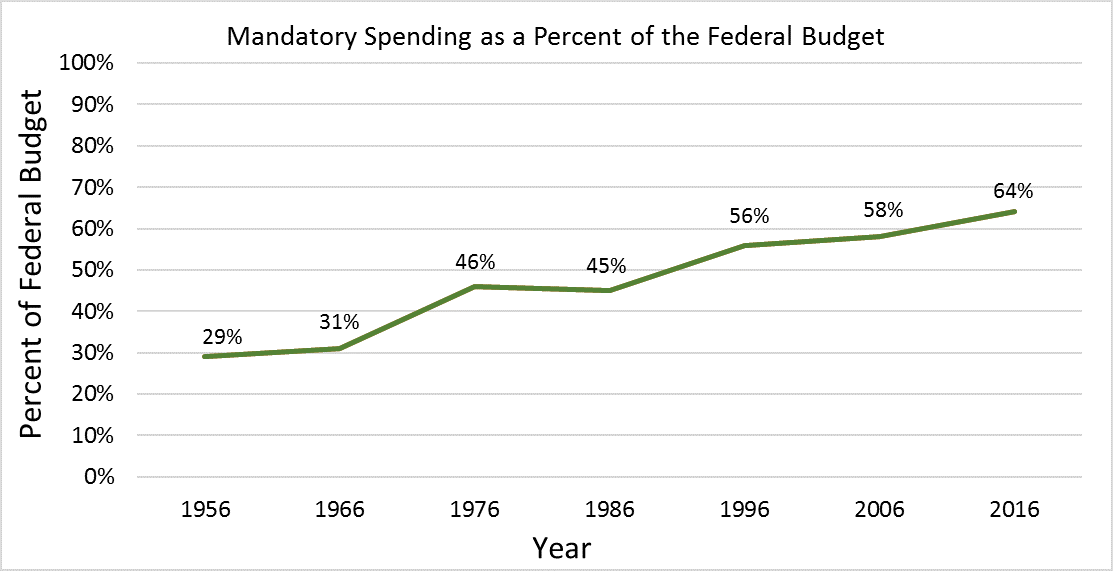
A graph showing the increase of mandatory spending (entitlements) as a percentage of the federal budget

Near the end, the authors argue that America is in decline. They point to slowed productivity, dwindling business dynamism, weakened labor mobility, and higher business concentration as evidence for the decline. The authors blame the decline on overregulation and the growth of entitlement spending. The authors recommend America move away from a defined-benefit system and towards a Swedish-style defined-contribution plan while indexing the age of retirement to rising life expectancy as solutions to combat the decline.

== Reception ==
=== Accolades ===
Capitalism in America was shortlisted for the 2018 Financial Times and McKinsey Business Book of the Year Award, and was included in the Financial Times' list of best economics books of the year. The book was also included on lists of the best business books of 2018 by Business Insider and Mint. Capitalism in America was a CNN book of the week and The Guardian book of the day. According to EBSCO, Capitalism in America was the third best-selling title of the year in the business and economics category.

=== Reviews ===
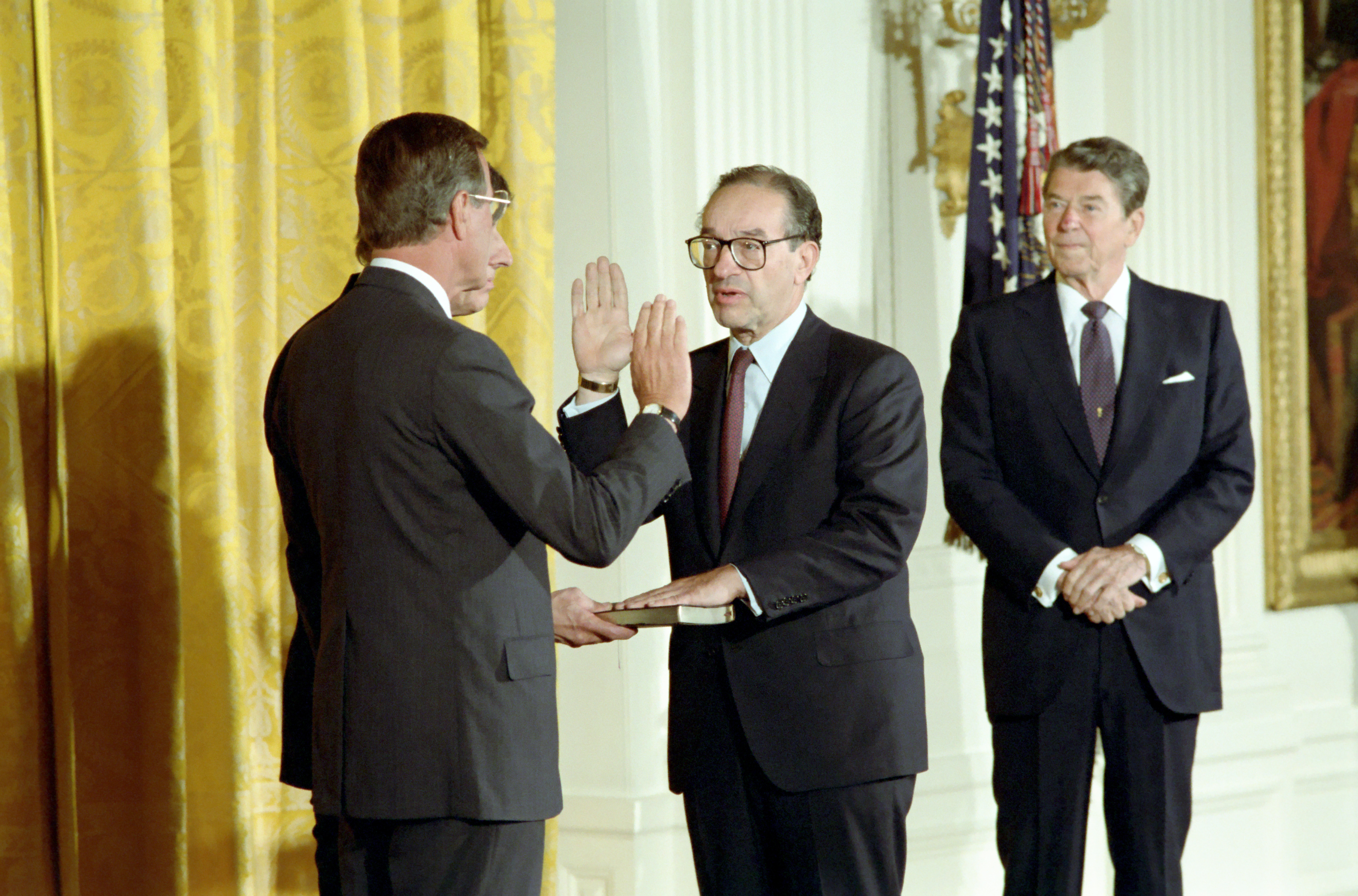
Ronald Reagan attending Alan Greenspan's swearing-in ceremony for chairman of the Federal Reserve Board

Writing in The American Conservative, American economist Mark Skousen called Capitalism in America "the best summary of American exceptionalism since John Chamberlain revealed the remarkable story of The Enterprising Americans in 1963", as well as "required reading for anyone who cares about life, liberty, and prosperity in America". Financial economist Felix von Meyerinck labeled it "a valuable addition to the financial history literature".

Of frequent praise was the writing style. British economist and journalist Liam Halligan called it "businesslike but culturally savvy", highlighting the care and skill in covering social trends. Economics professor Robert J. Gordon praised the book's presentation of American history as vivid, insightful, and of the high standard of a work from The Economist. Economist Brad DeLong criticised the book for its one-sidedness, but described the authors’ argument as “broadly correct”. In the view of Goldman Sachs strategist and economist Abby Joseph Cohen, "It's extremely well-written. It is an absorbing read."

Critics found the presentation of ideas engaging, The Times columnist Gerard Baker calling it a "compelling and well-documented single-volume history." Meyerinck attributed it to the author's ability to condense several sources and documents in a "very well written" book, and Publishers Weekly credited it to the fast pace at which its several "fun facts" were presented. Skousen and American economist Deirdre McCloskey analogized the content as "spark[ling]" with quotes and statistics, "a stylistic device that academic histories often overlook". For McCloskey and British philosopher Alan Ryan, the most exciting-to-read parts of the book were its biographies and entrepreneurs and innovators. Wrote Ryan, "The bare recital of their names is enough to conjure up an image of a world remaking itself, taking on the form it still essentially possess." Also brought up was the book's ability to present complex ideas in a manner accessible to all readers. British economist Diane Coyle argued the book successfully makes it case "with some wonderful insights into business history".

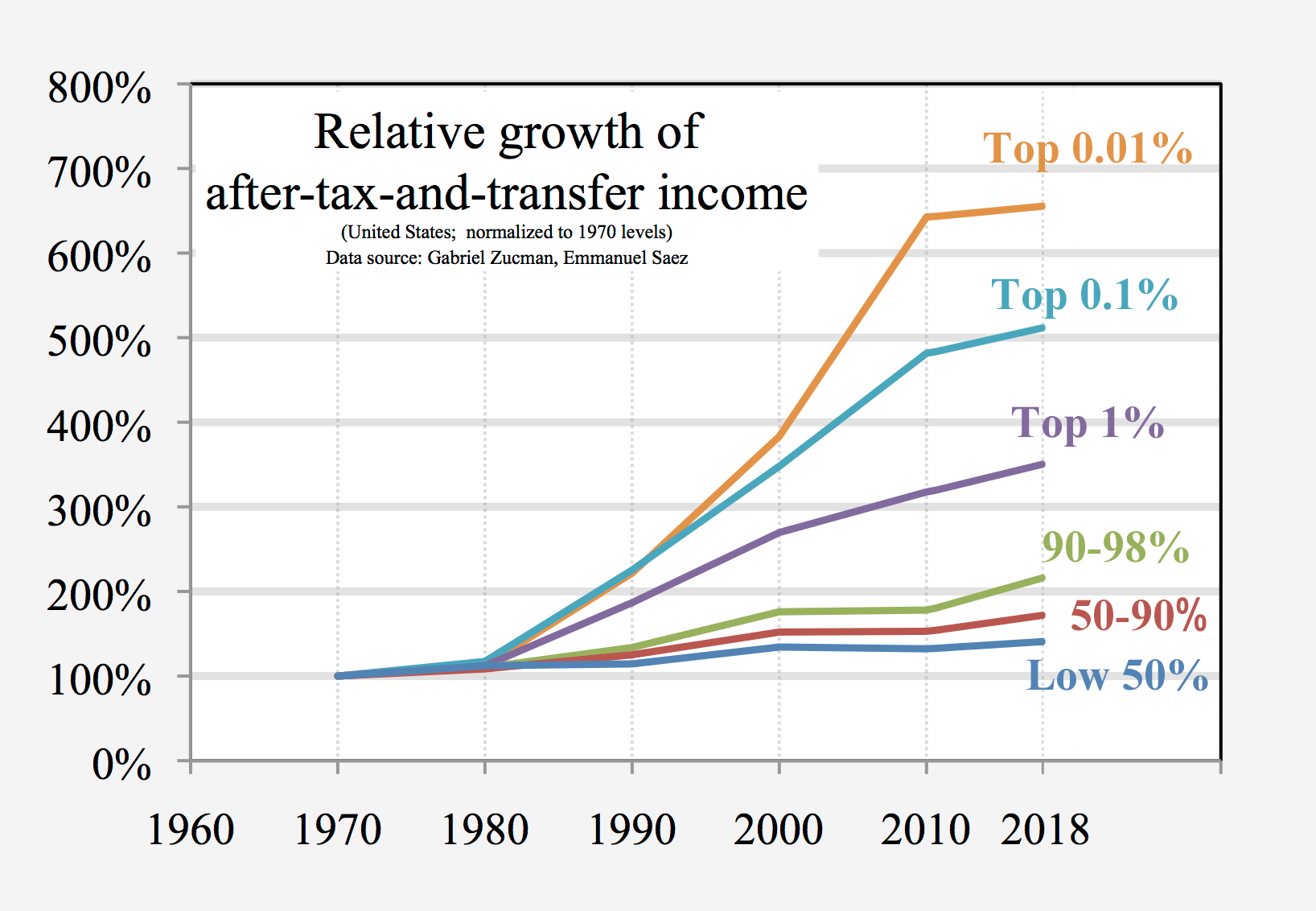
A graph showing the increase of income inequality in the United States between various income groups

Although American economist Edward Glaeser stated Capitalism in America would change the minds of some Bernie Sanders supporters, James B. Stewart of The New York Times suggested it could offend supporters of Donald Trump and "the resurgent left among Democrats." Commonly criticized was the one-sidedness of the book. Argued Baker and American historian Christopher Phelps, Capitalism in America never mentioned increased inequality and concentration of wealth in the hands of big companies as factors in the current issues the authors brought up. The book also failed to present the nuances of capitalism, such as its many incarnations, the limits of self-regulating markets, and how democratic institutions make up for market failures, as well as other North American nations with natural resources and political and economic structures similar to the United States. Ryan felt the book was "somewhat given to fantasy" and overlooked the "injustice" of a capitalistic system: "The gales of creative destruction, after all, don't only undermine the fortune of slow-moving entrepreneurs but also throw innumerable workers and their families on the scrapheap." Meyerinck noted that the book does grant the need for a level-playing level that allows any entrepreneur to compete, but gives no solution towards how to do it, or even an opinion on whether the United States market met that criteria.

The book was also criticized for its simplistic framing, such as of capitalism as an economic system instead of a complex social order, as well as the main issue simply being progress versus those trying to stop it. Argued American historian Kim Phillips-Fein, "what was at stake was always the question of who would benefit from economic change and the kind of social order it would make possible. By framing the issue as a simple resistance to technology and growth, Greenspan and Wooldridge sidestep the underlying questions about democracy, equality, and freedom that are at the heart of this long-standing struggle."

== See also ==
- History of capitalism
- The Rise and Fall of American Growth
