= Kim Phillips-Fein =

American historian

Kim Phillips-Fein Vargo
- Born: August 1975 (age 51)

Academic background
- Education: BA, history, 1997, University of Chicago; PhD, American history 2005, Columbia University
- Thesis: Top-down revolution: businessmen, intellectuals and politicians against the New Deal (2005)

Academic work
- Institutions: New York University; Columbia University
- Notable works: Fear City: New York’s Fiscal Crisis and the Rise of Austerity Politics
- Website: kimphillipsfein.com

Kimberly Phillips-Fein (née Kimberly Kather Phillips; born August 1975) is an American historian. and the Gardiner-Kenneth T. Jackson Professor of History at Columbia University. She's married to Greg Fein.

She was formerly a professor at the Gallatin School of Individualized Study and the History Department of the College of Arts and Science at New York University (NYU).

Her book Fear City: New York's Fiscal Crisis and the Rise of Austerity Politics was named a finalist for the 2018 Pulitzer Prize for History.

== Early life and education ==
Phillips-Fein was born in New York City in August 1975, and grew up in downtown Brooklyn. Both of her parents worked at Lincoln Hospital in the Bronx, and were active in efforts to improve the provision of services to the hospital's largely poor Black and Puerto Rican population.

Phillips-Fein earned a Bachelor of Arts degree in history from the University of Chicago in 1997, before enrolling at Columbia University, where she earned her PhD.

== Career ==
After she received her PhD, Phillips-Fein joined the faculty at New York University (NYU) and became a 2008–09 NYU Center for the Humanities Fellow. With the assistance of this fellowship, she published her first book, Invisible Hands: The Businessmen's Crusade Against the New Deal. The book is an account of how high-powered individuals fought against the legacy of the New Deal from World War II to the election of Ronald Reagan as president. She describes how wealthy people, including members of the Du Pont Dynasty, created lobbying organizations or non-profit educational organizations based on what she and many other people consider ideological beliefs favoring the wealthy. These organizations include the American Enterprise Institute which was previously named American Enterprise Association and The Heritage Foundation, both of which have been investigated for possible political activity, but were able to keep their tax exempt status. She also reports about The Powell Memo which was written shortly before Lewis Powell was nominated to Supreme Court of the United States. Jack Anderson obtained a copy of this shortly after he was confirmed and published excerpts of it, despite the fact that it was supposed to be kept confidential at the time. Following this the Chamber of commerce released a full copy of it and admitted it was true. This Memo was reported on briefly in the 1970s by traditional media but rarely if ever reported on since; although Conspiracy theorists and historical researchers often continue reporting on this, but, like C. Wright Mills author of The Power Elite she focuses on research that can be confirmed from reliable sources, which may show powerful people are in a position to act in secrecy she doesn't theorize without evidence.

Following this publication, she received a Cullman Center for Scholars, Artists and Writers fellowship at the New York Public Library for the 2014–15 academic year to write her second book.

Phillips-Fein published her second book, Fear City: New York's Fiscal Crisis and the Rise of Austerity Politics, in 2017. The book "explores the causes, effects, and the legacy of New York City's fiscal crisis of 1975". Fear City was named a finalist for the 2018 Pulitzer Prize for History and she received a 2020 Guggenheim Fellowship.

== Bibliography ==
=== Books ===
- Phillips-Fein, Kim (2009). Invisible Hands: The Making of the Conservative Movement from the New Deal to Reagan. W. W. Norton & Co. ISBN 9780393059304.
- Phillips-Fein, Kim; Julian E. Zelizer, eds. (2012). What's Good for Business: Business and American Politics since World War II. Oxford University Press. ISBN 9780199754014.
- Phillips-Fein, Kim; Richard R. John, eds. (2016). Capital Gains: Business and Politics in Twentieth-Century America. University of Pennsylvania Press. ISBN 9780812248821.
- Kim Phillips-Fein (2018). Fear City: New York's Fiscal Crisis and the Rise of Austerity Politics. MacMillan. ISBN 9781250160072.
- Phillips-Fein, Kim (July 21, 2026). Country of Lords: Neo-Aristocrats, Social Darwinists, Tech Utopians, and the Long Fight against Equality in America. W. W. Norton & Company. ISBN 978-1324074441.

=== Articles ===
- Kim Phillips-Fein, "Conspicuous Destruction" (review of Brendan Ballou, Plunder: Private Equity's Plan to Pillage America, PublicAffairs, 2023, 353 pp.; and Gretchen Morgenson and Joshua Rosner, These Are the Plunderers: How Private Equity Runs – and Wrecks – America, Simon and Schuster, 2023, 383 pp.), The New York Review of Books, vol. LXX, no. 16 (19 October 2023), pp. 33–35. "[P]rivate equity firms create nothing and provide no meaningful services – on the contrary, they actively undermine functional companies." (p. 34.) "Tax law plays a critical part in making [private equity] funds profitable. The 'carried interest' provision, for example, which allows most of the profits of private equity partners to be taxed at the lower capital gains rate rather than as earnings, is crucial to their self-enrichment." (p. 35.)
