= The Right Nation =

2004 book by Micklethwait and Wooldridge

- Author: John Micklethwait, Adrian Wooldridge
- Publication date: May 24, 2004
- ISBN: 1-59420-020-3

The Right Nation (ISBN 1-59420-020-3) is a book published in 2004 which charts the rise of the Republican Party in the United States since Barry Goldwater's defeat in 1964. It was written by journalists, John Micklethwait and Adrian Wooldridge. Publishers Weekly described the book as an "engaging study of American conservatism" and a "penetrating analysis."

The book is composed of four parts:

- History, which comprises a discussion of the government careers of the Bush family, a discussion of George W. Bush's psychology, and an outline of the fortunes of the GOP during the second half of the 20th century.
- Anatomy, which discusses the way in which the Republican Party set about recovering from its near-catastrophic defeat in 1964, the role that think tanks play in the development of policy and political philosophy, particularly the American Enterprise Institute and The Heritage Foundation, and the power of footsoldiers motivated by cultural values in winning elections.
- Prophecy, which envisages two possible near-futures: why a Republican hegemony is (they argue) approaching, and reasons why this future may not come to pass.
- Exception discusses the theory of American exceptionalism and what it portends for the fortunes of political philosophies in the U.S.

Micklethwait and Wooldridge were, respectively, the U.S. editor and Washington correspondent for The Economist.
