= Capital Gains: Business and Politics in Twentieth-Century America =

2017 book by Richard R. John and Kim Phillips-Fein

- Editors: Richard R. John and Kim Phillips-Fein
- Language: English
- Series: Hagley Perspectives on Business and Culture
- Subject: Business and politics, Political economy of the United States
- Genre: Non-fiction, Edited volume
- Publisher: University of Pennsylvania Press
- Publication date: 2017
- Publication place: United States
- Pages: 312
- ISBN: 978-0-8122-4882-1
- OCLC: 952732873

Capital Gains: Business and Politics in Twentieth-Century America is a 2017 edited volume by American historians Richard R. John and Kim Phillips-Fein. The volume was published by the University of Pennsylvania Press as part of the Hagley Perspectives on Business and Culture series. The book brings together eleven essays by historians that investigate the engagement of business leaders with governmental institutions in the United States during the twentieth century, at the federal, state, and municipal levels. Based in many cases on the archival holdings of the Hagley Museum and Library, the contributors cover subjects ranging from the founding of the U.S. Chamber of Commerce and municipal boosterism in the 1920s to military procurement, patent policy, postwar economic development, corporate civil rights, and business opposition to the Vietnam War. The collection argues that the relationship between business and politics in the United States was more varied and less consistently adversarial than is often assumed, and that business leaders frequently sought to expand, rather than minimize, the capacity of the state when doing so served their interests.

== Summary ==
The work is an edited collection of eleven essays investigating how business leaders in the United States engaged with governmental institutions during the twentieth century.

In her brief preface, Phillips-Fein presents the volume as part of a broader expansion in historical scholarship on the political activities of businesspeople. She reminds readers that earlier generations of scholars studied the politics of working-class people with great care but left their business counterparts comparatively unexamined. The essays, she writes, seeks to sketch "a political tradition in the business world that welcomed certain kinds of government activity," thus challenging the assumption that business leaders consistently sought to minimize the role of government.

John's introduction presents the collection within a long historiographical tradition stretching from the Progressive school of Charles Beard and Matthew Josephson (through the "corporate liberal" interpretations of Martin Sklar and Gabriel Kolko) to more recent work on the history of capitalism. Alfred D. Chandler Jr.'s The Visible Hand reshaped business history by arguing that the sequencing of "big business" before "big government" in the United States explained the uniquely adversarial character of American business-government relations. The introduction explains that the essays in the volume move beyond these earlier frameworks by showing that the relationship between business and politics was far more varied and contingent than any single interpretive tradition has thus far acknowledged.

The book is organized into four chronological and thematic parts. The first, covering the Progressive Era and the 1920s, features Laura Phillips Sawyer's study of the founding of the U.S. Chamber of Commerce in 1912 and its efforts to work alongside the Department of Commerce and the Federal Trade Commission to develop a technocratic approach to managing competitive markets under the Sherman Act, and Daniel Amsterdam's account of how business elites in Detroit and Atlanta lobbied municipal governments in the 1920s to fund ambitious programs of public works (schools, sewers, parks, libraries, and museums) laying the foundations for what Amsterdam terms a "civic welfare state."

The second part focuses on the New Deal and World War II. Eric S. Hintz reconstructs the lobbying campaign organized by the National Association of Manufacturers to block patent reform during the Temporary National Economic Committee hearings of 1938–1939, showing how the NAM's "Modern Pioneers" public relations campaign helped forestall compulsory licensing proposals. Mark R. Wilson challenges the prevailing image of the military-industrial complex as a static arrangement by documenting a multi-decade shift in military procurement from in-house government production to corporate outsourcing. He contends that World War II marked a midpoint in this transformation. Richard R. John and Jason Scott Smith provide a jointly-authored an intellectual portrait of the historian Thomas K. McCraw. In this piece, they emphasize his comparative institutionalist approach and his conviction that the New Deal "mixed economy" was a remarkable policy innovation that underwrote the country's postwar prosperity.

In the third part, Tami J. Friedman documents the tensions around plant closure and capital flight that emerged in the 1950s between nationally oriented business organizations such as the NAM, which opposed federal aid to communities affected by plant closings on free-market ideological grounds, and local business leaders in the deindustrializing Northeast who actively sought federal assistance. Brent Cebul shows how business leaders in rural northwestern Georgia enthusiastically lobbied for federal funding for infrastructure and education, forming public-private planning commissions that became models for the Appalachian Regional Commission, a pattern he describes as "supply-side liberalism." Elizabeth Tandy Shermer follows the fraught partnerships between business boosters, corporate funders, and educational administrators in Arizona, North Carolina, and California as they built up public universities. She reminds readers that business interests favored technical and professional programs while educators championed the liberal arts.

In the fourth part, contributors study the relationship between business and postwar liberalism. Jennifer Delton reveals an ideological struggle within the NAM during the 1950s and 1960s between ultraconservatives who held that a business's only obligation was to earn a profit and moderates who endorsed the doctrine of "social responsibility," a contest that the moderates won—an outcome Delton presents as evidence of the strength of the mid-century liberal consensus. Eric R. Smith recovers the surprising history of the Business Executives Move for Vietnam Peace, a small but notable organization of business leaders who opposed the Vietnam War primarily on economic grounds, arguing that military spending was fueling inflation, draining resources from domestic needs, and weakening the dollar. Finally, Pamela Walker Laird investigates corporate responses to the Civil Rights Act of 1964. She argues that the evolution of workplace integration resulted from a complex, mutually reinforcing interaction among activism, changing cultural norms, and legal enforcement, rather than from any single factor.

== Reception ==
For Meg Jacobs, the volume made it clear that scholars of political history and business history "ignore the other at their own intellectual peril," and suggested that the essays raise productive new questions about how the expanding modern state shaped business practices. She praised the authors for moving "well beyond portrayals of business leaders as robber barons or industrial statesmen" and credited John's introduction with laying out "the past, present, and future of the field."

Nelson Lichtenstein called it a "fine collection of essays," praising John and Phillips-Fein for showing how businesspeople sought to advance their interests through politics. He identified a key theme: business leaders readily embraced selective uses of state power and resources, as shown in essays on the Chamber of Commerce's support for federal agencies, municipal spending in Detroit and Atlanta, southern infrastructure development, and the growth of state universities. However, Lichtenstein challenged Jennifer Delton's essay on the National Association of Manufacturers, arguing that she mistakenly equated corporate "social responsibility" with the theory of corporate liberalism advanced by New Left historians like Weinstein and Sklar, and he pointed to essays by Pamela Walker-Laird and Tami J. Friedman as correctives showing that corporate civil rights policy followed legislative and judicial pressure and that national business associations opposed federal aid to depressed areas because they benefited from the low wages and high unemployment in those regions.

Edward Balleisen commended John's introduction as a piece that "for some years to come, savvy graduate students will scour," both for "its rich overview of leading works in the field" and "its trenchant delineation of dominant trends in scholarship about American business and the state." However, Balleisen added that the volume lacked contributions from political scientists, sociologists, or legal scholars, which he called "an important missed opportunity" that might have prompted "fruitful debates about when one can spot enduring patterns in American business-state relations."

Mel van Elteren found the chapters "thoroughly researched and well written, making them accessible to a wider readership." He made special note of the chapters by Amsterdam, Cebul, Shermer, Delton, and Smith and thought that the volume "should be read by everyone interested in this relationship regarding Progressive, corporate-liberal, and neoliberal policies in the last century."

For Veronica Binda, the approach of combining political history, business history, political science, historical sociology, and the history of capitalism "allows the reader to reconstruct effectively the complexity of businessmen's approach to the political world." She called it "an outstanding book." Binda added that the "provocative approach of some of the essays" and their selective focus "do not in the least diminish the contribution of this book, making it, instead, a great starting point for further investigations."
