= Richard R. John =

American historian (born 1959)

Richard Rodda John, Jr. (born 1959) is an American historian who specializes in the history of business, technology, communications, and the state. He is a professor of history and communications at Columbia University.

== Life and career ==
John was born in Lexington, Massachusetts in 1959. His father, Richard R. John, Sr., was director of the aerophysics laboratory at the Avco Corporation in Massachusetts. He attended Lexington High School and went on to Harvard University where between 1981 and 1989, he earned a B.A. in social studies (magna cum laude), an M.A. in history, and a Ph.D. in the history of American civilization. He wrote his dissertation under the joint direction of Alfred D. Chandler Jr. and David Herbert Donald.

=== Academic posts ===
After serving as a teaching fellow in history, history and literature, and social studies at Harvard, John held a two-year postdoctoral fellowship at the College of William and Mary. He joined the history faculty at the University of Illinois at Chicago in 1991, where he taught until 2009. He is a professor of history and communications at Columbia University, where he advises graduate students in the Columbia Journalism's School's Ph. D. program in communications. He regularly teaches a required course — History Essentials — in the journalism school's M.S. program. He is a core member of Columbia's history faculty, where he advises Ph.D. students in history. He also teaches undergraduate and graduate courses in the history of capitalism, the history of communications, social theory (including Contemporary Civilization), and American studies. Between 1983 and 1987, John served as managing and consulting editor of the Business History Review. He has been a fellow at the Newberry Library in Chicago and the Smithsonian Institution's Woodrow Wilson Center in Washington, D. C. He was the founder and coordinator of the Newberry Library Seminar on Technology, Politics, and Culture, which ran from 1998 to 2007. In 2001 and 2011, he served as a visiting professor at the École des Hautes Études en Sciences Sociales (EHESS) in Paris. In 2002, he was awarded the Harold F. Williamson Prize for a scholar at mid-career who has made "significant contributions to the field of business history," by the Business History Conference, an international professional society dedicated to the study of institutional history, which elected John its president for 2010-2011. Among the institutions that have sponsored his research are the College of William and Mary, the American Antiquarian Society, and the National Endowment for the Humanities, which awarded him a faculty fellowship in 2008. In 2019 he was awarded a Guggenheim Foundation fellowship for his research on the American antimonopoly tradition.

=== Publications ===
Network Nation won the Ralph Gomory Book Prize from the Business History Conference in 2011 and the 2011 Best Book Prize from the American Educators in Journalism and Mass Communications (AEJMC) History Division. According to political scientist Christopher Parsons, in John's Network Nation (2010), the historian "has carefully poured through original source documents and so can offer insights into the actual machinations of politicians, investors, municipal aldermen, and communications companies’ CEOs and engineers to weave a comprehensive account of the telegraph and telephone industries." David E. Nye called it "a richly detailed and readable book that fills an important gap in the history of communication networks."

=== Influence ===
Since assuming his post at Columbia University, John has been known for publicly challenging vogue political economic theses on the basis of the historical record, including Tim Wu's proclamations about media consolidation and disruption and mainstream media stirrings about Mitt Romney and the role of plutocrats in American politics. He is critical of proposals to privatize the post office, and supports postal banking.

== Bibliography ==
John's publications include many essays, articles, and reviews, six edited books, and two monographs, Spreading the News: The American Postal System from Franklin to Morse (Cambridge: Harvard University Press, 1995), and Network Nation: Inventing American Telecommunications (Cambridge: Belknap Press of Harvard University Press, 2010).

=== Authored books ===
- 2010 – Network Nation: Inventing American Telecommunications (Cambridge, Massachusetts: Belknap Press of Harvard University Press, 2017) ISBN 978-0-674-02429-8.
- 1995 – Spreading the News: The American Postal System from Franklin to Morse (Cambridge, Massachusetts: Harvard University Press, 1995; paperback, 1998; in print 2010) ISBN 978-0-674-83342-5. Winner of the Allan Nevins Prize from the Society of American Historians, and the Herman E. Krooss Prize from the Business History Conference.

=== Edited books ===
- 1986 – Managing Big Business: Essays from the Business History Review. Co-editor, with Richard S. Tedlow. Boston: Harvard Business School Press, 1986.
- 2001 - Richard R. John, ed. (2001). "Computers and Communications Networks". Business History Review. 75. ISSN 0007-6805. Wikidata Q134679967.
- 2006 – John, Richard R. (2006). "Ruling Passions: Political Economy in Nineteenth-Century America". Journal of Policy History. 18 (1): 1–20. doi:10.1353/jph.2005.0028. S2CID 154695229. Project MUSE 190880. Also published as: John, Richard R. (2006). "Ruling Passions: Political Economy in Nineteenth-Century America". 18 (1): 1–20. doi:10.7916/D8KP9JR3
- 2012 – The American Postal Network, 1792-1914, 4 vols. London: Pickering & Chatto, 2012.
- 2015 – John, Richard R.; Silberstein-Loeb, Jonathan, eds. (2015). Making News: The Political Economy of Journalism in Britain and America from the Glorious Revolution to the Internet. OUP Oxford. ISBN 978-0-19-166374-1. See also: John, Richard R.; Silberstein-Loeb, Jonathan (2015). "Making News": 1–18. doi:10.7916/D8PG38B0
- 2017 – John, Richard R.; Phillips-Fein, Kim, eds. (2017). Capital Gains: Business and Politics in Twentieth-Century America. University of Pennsylvania Press. ISBN 978-0-8122-4882-1 See also: John, Richard R. (2016). "Adversarial Relations? Business and Politics in Twentieth-Century America": 1–21. doi:10.7916/D82Z2P27. S2CID 158939584

=== Book Reviews ===
- 2020 – John, Richard R. (2020). "Brandeis, Hoover, and the Problem of Fair Trade in Interwar America". doi:10.7916/d8-fvpq-6b47
- 2022 – John, Richard R. (2022). "Regulatory History by the Book". doi:10.7916/qe7r-dt95

=== Book series editorships ===
- “Business, Technology, and Politics.” Johns Hopkins University Press, since 2014.
- "American Business, Politics, and Society." University of Pennsylvania Press (with Pamela W. Laird, University of Colorado at Denver, and Mark Rose, Florida Atlantic University) from 2007-2012.
- "How Things Worked: Institutional Dimensions of the American Past." Johns Hopkins University Press (with Robin Einhorn, University of California at Berkeley), since 2007.

=== Book chapters ===
- John, Richard R. (2003). "Affairs of Office: The Executive Departments, the Election of 1828, and the Making of the Democratic Party": 50–84. doi:10.7916/D8K08MXW
- John, Richard R. (2004). "Private Enterprise, Public Good? Communications Deregulation as a National Political Issue, 1839-1851": 328–354. doi:10.7916/D86M4QDP
- John, Richard R. (2010). "Expanding the Realm of Communications": 211–220. doi:10.7916/D8BG45N2
- John, Richard R. (2012). "From Franklin to Facebook: The Civic Mandate for Communications": 156–172. doi:10.7916/D8J11KTH
- John, Richard R. (2013). "Communications Networks in the United States from Chappe to Marconi". 1: 310–322. doi:10.7916/D8X93TVS
- John, Richard R. (2014). "American Political Development and Political History": 1–18. doi:10.7916/D89G74DB
- John, Richard R.; Balbi, Gabriele (2015). "Point-to-Point: Telecommunications Networks from the Optical Telegraph to the Mobile Telephone". 5: 35–55. doi:10.7916/D8QJ90XK
- John, Richard R. (2015). "Markets, Morality, and the Media: The Election of 1884 and the Iconography of Progressivism": 75–97. doi:10.7916/D8G17HDZ
- John, Richard R. (2016). "Letters, Telegrams, News": 119–135. doi:10.7916/D83V10S8
- John, Richard R. (2017). "Proprietary Interest: Merchants, Journalists, and Antimonopoly in the 1880s": 10–35. doi:10.7916/D8X36F3F
- John, Richard R. (2018). "The Public Image of the Universal Postal Union in the Anglophone World, 1874-1949": 38–69. doi:10.7916/D8M05P17
- John, Richard R. (2020). "John Bull, Uncle Sam, Transatlantic Steamships, and the Mail": 193–207. doi:10.7916/d8-jjt5-w019
- John, Richard R. (2020). "When Techno-Diplomacy Failed: Walter S. Rogers, the Universal Electrical Communications Union, and the Limitations of the International Telegraph Union as a Global Actor in the 1920s": 55–76. doi:10.7916/d8-877r-6k48
- Tworek, Heidi J. S.; John, Richard R. (2020). "Global Communications": 315–331. doi:10.7916/d8-zv3j-3c18
- John, Richard R. (2021). "Publicity, Propaganda, and Public Opinion: From the Titanic Disaster to the Hungarian Uprising" [with Heidi J. S. Tworek]. In Information: A Historical Companion, edited by Ann Blair, Paul Duguid, Anja Going, and Anthony Grafton. Princeton. Princeton University Press. doi:10.7916/d8-69dg-xc15
- John, Richard R. (2024). "Reframing the Monopoly Question" Antimonopoly and American Democracy, Oxford University Press. doi:10.1093/oso/9780197744666.003.0002

=== Articles and essays ===
- John, Richard R. (1997). "Governmental Institutions as Agents of Change: Rethinking American Political Development in the Early Republic, 1787–1835". Studies in American Political Development. 11 (2): 347–380. doi:10.1017/S0898588X00001693 S2CID 145391144
- John, Richard R. (1997). "Elaborations, Revisions, Dissents: Alfred D. Chandler, Jr.'s., The Visible Hand after Twenty Years". 71 (2): 151–200. doi:10.7916/D8NS2BJX S2CID 145391144
- John, Richard R. (2008). "Telecommunications". 9 (3): 507–520. doi:10.7916/D8F495PW S2CID 145391144
- "The Postal Monopoly and Universal Service: A History." School of Public Policy, George Mason University, posted December 2008. Web:
- John, Richard R. (2010). "The Political Economy of Postal Reform in the Victorian Age". 55: 3–12. doi:10.7916/D8W39CWR S2CID 145391144
- John, Richard R. (2012). "Robber Barons Redux: Antimonopoly Reconsidered". 13 (1): 1–38. doi:10.7916/D8NK4XMJ S2CID 145391144
- John, Richard R. (2015). "Projecting Power Overseas: U.S. Postal Policy and International Standard-Setting at the 1863 Paris Postal Conference". 17 (3): 416–438. doi:10.7916/D82V3ZRV S2CID 145391144
- John, Richard R. (2018). "The State Is Back In: What Now?". 38 (1): 105–118. doi:10.7916/d8-xw2v-x963 S2CID 145391144
- John, Richard R. (2019). "Freedom of Expression in the Digital Age: A Historian's Perspective". 4 (1): 25–38. doi:10.7916/d8-gkec-b033 S2CID 145391144
- John, Richard R.; Laborie, Léonard (2019). "'Circuits of Victory': How the First World War Shaped the Political Economy of the Telephone in the United States and France". 35 (2): 115–137. doi:10.7916/d8-nqx2-bm33 S2CID 145391144
- John, Richard R.; Jin, Gengxing (2021). "The Historical Role of Communications Networks: A Conversation". 7 (4): 53–88. doi:10.7916/d8-p8g3-4s05 S2CID 145391144
- John, Richard R. (April 2022). "Political contestation and the Second Great Divergence". History Compass. 20 (4). doi:10.1111/hic3.12722 S2CID 247751327
- John, Richard R. (2023). "Debating New Media: Rewriting Communications History". Technology and Culture. 64 (2): 308–358. doi:10.1353/tech.2023.0055 S2CID 258561817 Project MUSE 893040.

== See also ==
- Telegraph
- Telephone
- Postal System
