= Decline of Christianity in the Western world =

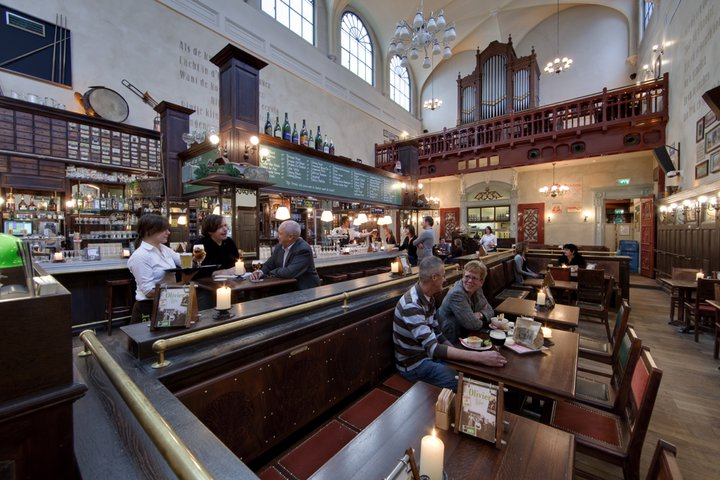
Clandestine since the Protestant Reformation, this Latin Catholic Church, was converted into the Belgian Beer Cafe in Utrecht, Netherlands

A decline of Christian affiliation in the Western world has been observed in the decades since the end of World War II (1939–1945). While most countries in the Western world were historically almost exclusively Christian, the post–World War II era has seen developed countries with modern, secular educational facilities shifting towards post-Christian, secular, globalized, multicultural, and multifaith societies.

While Christianity is currently the predominant religion in North America, Latin America, and Europe, the religion is declining in many of these areas, particularly in Western Europe, Central Europe, the United States, Australia, Canada and New Zealand. A decline in Christianity among countries in Latin America's Southern Cone has also contributed to a rise in irreligion in Latin America.

In the Western world, historical developments since the Reformation era in the sixteenth century, including the Enlightenment movement, led to a gradual separation of church and state from the eighteenth century onward. Since at least the mid-twentieth century, there has been a gradual decline in adherence to established Christianity. In a process described as secularization, "unchurched spirituality" is gaining more prominence over organized religion. (Note: Hugh McLeod, emeritus professor of Church History at the University of Birmingham, provides a helpful summary of the decline of Christendom in Western Europe in four stages: 1 Toleration of alternative forms of Christianity (in the Reformation and post-Reformation era in the 16th century and onward). 2 Publication of literature that was critical of Christianity (in the Enlightenment era of the 18th century). 3 Separation of church and state (from the 18th century onward). 4 The "gradual loosening of the ties between church and society". [...] At least since the mid-20th century, many European countries have experienced a decline in churched religion. In particular, declining church attendance has been an important aspect of this process, and a characteristic of the development that has been described as the secularization process. [...] The secularization processes in the Western world involve a partial replacement of established Christianity by unchurched spirituality, characterized by á la carte religion and a focus on "me and my experiences".)

== Background ==
According to a 2012 Pew Research Center survey, Christianity will remain the world's largest religion throughout the next four decades. However, Christianity may experience the largest net losses in terms of religious conversion, according to expectations. Worldwide, religious conversions are projected to have a "modest impact on changes in the Christian population" between 2010 and 2050 and may negatively affect the growth of the Christian population and its share of the world's population "slightly".

In the past, it was believed that the rapid growth of Christianity in China during the 1980´s and 1990´s will continue and maintain, or even increase, the current numerical advantage of Christianity as the largest religion in the world. However, recent reports by Pew Research Center suggests that christianity in China has stopped growing and has instead entered a phase of stagnation. Some of the reasons for this change in course includes the crackdowns on christian churches and christian influence by Chinese authorities, the tightened oversight over clergy and congregations and the 'sinicization' of the christian faith.

In the United States, there have been some conversions to Christianity among those who grew up non-religious, but they have not been in numbers that make up for those who were raised as Christians but became religiously unaffiliated later in their lives. According to a Pew study in 2020, among adults aged 18 to 54 in 117 countries, 83% of those who were raised Christian remain Christian. The remaining 17% now identify as non-Christian, and the vast majority of former Christians no longer identify with any religion.

Scholars have proposed that church institutions decline in power and prominence in most industrialized societies, except in cases in which religion serves some function in society beyond merely regulating the relationship between individuals and God. Developing countries in Africa and Southeast Asia are not experiencing a decline, mostly because of religious conversion in those countries where the church offers broad social support services. Together with the decline of Western Christians, increasing numbers of Christians in the Global South will form a "new Christendom" in which the majority of the world's Christian population will be found in the South. According to various scholars and sources, Pentecostalism – a Protestant Christian movement – is the fastest-growing religion in the world; this growth is primarily due to religious conversion.

The European Values Study found that in most European countries in 2008, the majority of young respondents identified themselves as Christians. Unlike Western Europe, in Central and Eastern European countries, the proportion of Christians has either been stable or it has increased in the post-communist era. A large majority (83%) of those who were raised as Christians in Western Europe still identify as such. The remainder mostly self-identify as religiously unaffiliated. Christianity is still the largest religion in Western Europe, where 71% of Western Europeans identified themselves as Christian, according to a 2018 study by the Pew Research Center. In terms of belief, 27% of adults in 15 Western European countries believed in God as described in the Bible, while 38% in another spiritual force or higher power, and 26% held no belief in either.

A 2015 analysis of the European Values Study in the Handbook of Children and Youth Studies identified a "dramatic decline" in religious affiliation across Europe from 1981 to 2008; however, according to the same analysis, "the majority of young respondents in Europe claimed that they belonged to a Christian denomination".

In 2017, a report which was released by St. Mary's University, London, concluded that Christianity "as a norm" was gone for at least the foreseeable future. In at least 12 out of the 29 European countries which were surveyed by the researchers, based on a sample of 629 people, the majority of young adults reported that they were not religious. The data was obtained from two questions, one asking, "Do you consider yourself as belonging to any particular religion or denomination?" to the full sample and the other one asking "Which one?" to the sample who replied with "Yes". The Pew Research Center criticized the methodology of the two-step approach: "Presumably, this is because some respondents who are relatively low in religious practice or belief would answer the first question by saying that they have no religion, while the same respondents would identify as Christian, Muslim, Jewish, etc., if presented with a list of religions and asked to choose among them. The impact of these differences in question wording and format may vary considerably from country to country".

In 2018, the Pope lamented the ongoing trend of repurposing churches: some of them were being used as pizza joints, skating parks, strip clubs and bars. In Germany, 500 Catholic churches have closed since 2000. Canada has lost 20% of its churches in this time frame. This is the result of a lack of clergy who are willing to staff churches as well as the result of the churches' inability to meet costs. After a scandal in Naples where a deconsecrated church became the venue for a Halloween party which featured scantily clad witches who were seated on the former altar, Pope Francis, acknowledging the decline in Church attendance, implored that the deconsecrated churches be placed in service to fulfill the social needs of caring for the poor.

In a new study published in 2022, Pew Research Center projects that if the rate of switching continues to accelerate (primarily to no religious affiliation), Christians will make up less than half of the American population by 2070, with estimated ranges for that year falling between 35% and 46% of the American population (down from 64% in 2022 and down from 91% in 1976). The same study found a retention rate among American Christians closer to 67%, with one-third of those who were Christian in childhood leaving the religion by age 30. As of 2024, Christianity's decline in the United States may have leveled off or slowed, according to the Pew Research Center and Gallup. In 2024, about 73% of Americans raised Christian still identify as Christian, while 27% are no longer Christian. Most former Christians describe themselves religiously as atheists, agnostics or nothing in particular.

According to a 2025 report by the Pew Research Center, which surveyed 36 countries, Christianity had the highest ratios of people leaving the religion to people joining it in most of the countries surveyed and experienced the largest net losses due to religious switching. However, the analysis of religious switching into and out of Christianity was limited to 27 of the 36 countries, where sufficiently large samples of Christians were available. Despite these overall losses, Christianity experienced net gains from religious switching in a handful of countries included in the study, namely Singapore, Sri Lanka, Hungary, Ghana, and the Philippines.

=== Countervailing trends ===
After years of steep decline, Christian affiliation has leveled off in some parts of the Western world. In the United States, for example, studies reports that since around 2020 the share of adults identifying as Christian has steadied at roughly 62 percent. The reversal can be observed mainly among ages 18-24: the proportion who are Christian climbed from 45 percent to 51 percent between 2023 and 2024, while the proportion of religiously unaffiliated "nones" slipped from 46 percent to 41 percent. A similar pattern can be seen among Generation Z—particularly young men—to some extent in Australia, Austria, Canada, Denmark, France, Ireland, New Zealand, Spain, Sweden, and the United Kingdom.

Reports also note that young men are converting in notable numbers to what they see as more "masculine expressions" of Christianity, such as the Eastern and Oriental Orthodox churches, confessional branches of Evangelical Lutheranism and Catholicism. While exact figures are difficult to verify, Pew Research Center data indicate that the Orthodox Christian population is now about 64% male, up from 46% in 2007, suggesting a marked demographic shift toward men within these communities. Congregations of Conservative Anabaptist denominations have experienced continued growth, with Conservative Anabaptists having "large families and high retention rates".

In Western countries with large enough Christian samples to analyze, most people who currently identify as Christian were also raised Christian. However, in other regions, a significant share of those who call themselves Christian were not brought up in the faith. Notably, in countries such as Singapore, South Korea, and Sri Lanka, Christian accession rates exceed 10%. In Singapore in particular, nearly half of Christians (47%) say they were raised outside of Christianity.

== Europe ==
Largest (non-)religious group by EU member state according to Eurobarometer survey 2019. More than 75% Catholic 50–75% Catholic Relative Catholic majority 50–75% Protestant More than 75% Orthodox 50–75% non-religious Relative non-religious majority 30% Catholic, 30% non-religious (Germany)

According to scholars, in 2017, Europe's population was 77.8% Christian (up from 74.9% in 1970). These changes were largely the result of the collapse of Communism and conversions to Christianity in the former Soviet Union and Eastern Bloc countries. According to the 2021 Eurobarometer survey, Christianity was the largest religion in the European Union, accounting for 66.1% of the EU population, down from 72% in 2012.

In 2017, Pew Research Center found that the number of Christians in Europe is in decline. This is mainly because the number of deaths is estimated to exceed the number of births among European Christians, in addition to lower fertility rates and switching to no religious affiliation.

In 2018, Pew Research Center found a retention rate among Western European Christians of around 83% (ranging from 57% in the Netherlands to 91% in Austria). Despite the decline in Christian affiliation in Western Europe, Christianity is still the largest religion in Western Europe, where 71% of Western Europeans identified themselves as Christian, according to a 2018 study by the Pew Research Center. Unlike Western Europe, in Central and Eastern European countries the proportion of Christians has been stable or even increased in the post-communist era.

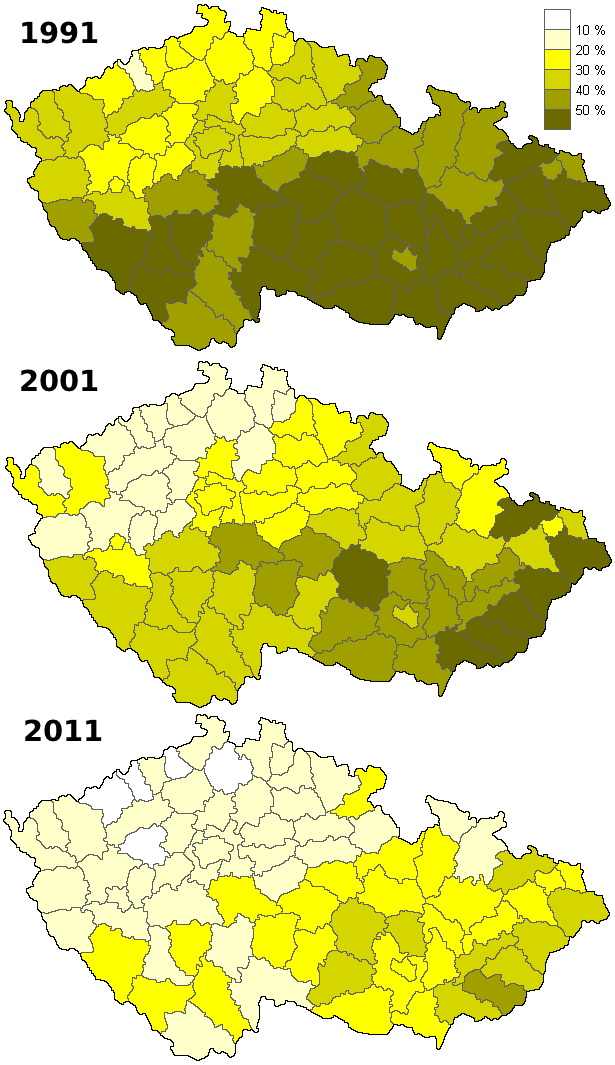
The decline of Christianity in the Czech Republic recorded throughout the censuses of 1991, 2001 and 2011.

In Western Europe, Christians have relatively low retention rates in the Netherlands (57%), Norway (62%), Belgium and Sweden (65%); the majority of those who have left Christianity in these countries now identify as religiously unaffiliated. Meanwhile, Christians have relatively high retention rates in Austria (91%), Switzerland and Italy (90%), and Ireland and the United Kingdom (89%). The proportion of respondents who currently identify as Christian has been in decline in Czechia and Slovakia; meanwhile, the proportion of respondents who currently identify as Christian has been stable or even increased in Eastern European countries after the collapse of Communism.

=== Austria ===
In Austria, between 1971 and 2021, Christianity declined from 93.8% to 68.2% (Catholicism from 87.4% to 55.2% and Protestantism from 6% to 3.8%) while people with no religion rose from 4.3% to 22.4%. According to the 2021 national survey conducted by Statistics Austria, among Christians, 80.9% were Catholics, 7.2% were Orthodox Christians, 5.6% were Protestants, while remaining 6.2% were Christians, belonging to other denominations of the religion or not affiliated with any denomination, and 22.4% declared they did not belong to any religion, denomination or religious community.

In absolute terms, the Catholic Church lists about 4.7–4.8 million members in 2022 (50–52% of the population). In 2022. 90,808 Austrians formally left the Catholic Church in 2022 and 85,163 left in 2023. Between 2019 and 2023, Catholic baptisms and Catholic Weddings decreased from over 45,000 to ~39,000 and ~11,000 to ~8,000 respectively. A survey shows roughly 322–348 thousand attended Sunday Mass in 2023, down from over 500,000 in pre-pandemic attendance trends. The Catholic bishops cite "unfavorable ratio between baptisms and deaths" as the key driver for this change.

=== Switzerland ===
Christianity in Switzerland has decreased from 80.5% in 2000 down to 55.9% in 2024. Swiss protestantism has suffered the most - going down from 33.9% to just 18.7% during the same period. The Catholic church went from 42.3% to 30%.

Non religiosity, on the other hand, has increased from 11.4% in 2000 to 36.8% in 2024. The shift away from religion is even more prevalant among young people aged 25 - 34 years where up to 42% have no religious beliefs.

=== Denmark ===
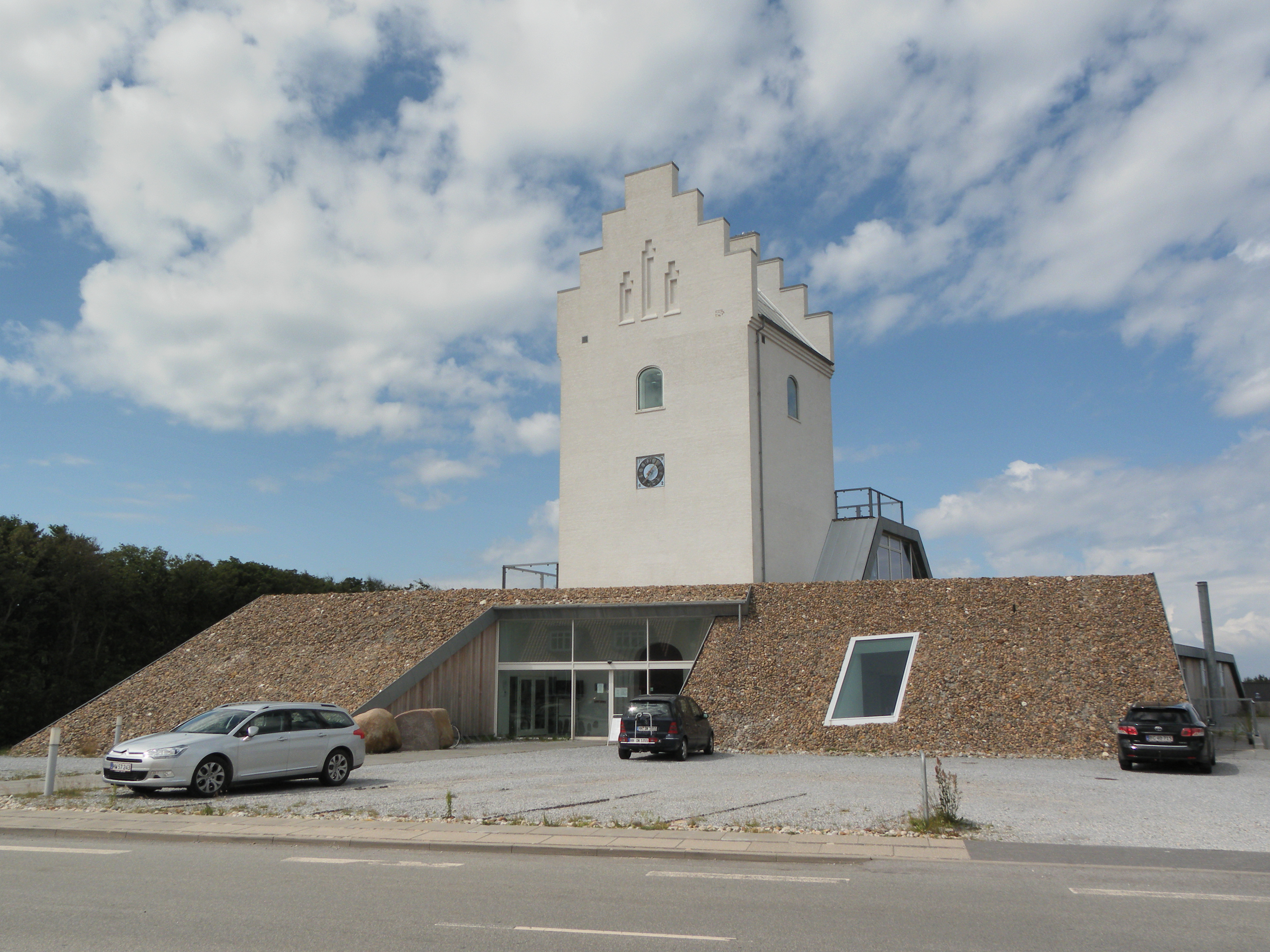
A church on Læsø island in Denmark, which has been transformed into a spa.

As of 2026, 69.8% of the population of Denmark were registered members of the Church of Denmark (which is Protestant in classification and Lutheran in orientation). This is down from 85.1% in 2000 and 80.9% in 2010. However, while the majority of the Danish population affiliates with the Church of Denmark, many do so for cultural reasons only.

According to a 2018 report by Pew Research Center, around just 17% of Danes believed God as described in the Bible, while 48% believed in other higher power or spiritual force, and 29% did not believe in any higher power.

=== Finland ===
Self-identification with Christianity has been steadily declining in Finland. In 2025, 62.2% of Finns counted themselves as belonging to a Christian church, compared with 86.2% in 2000.

The number of church members leaving the Church saw a particularly large increase during the fall of 2010. This was caused by statements regarding homosexuality and same-sex marriage – perceived to be intolerant towards LGBT people – made by a conservative bishop and a politician representing Christian Democrats in a TV debate on the subject.

=== France ===
Christianity has been declining in France steadily since the 1960s. In 2021, a French poll showed that over half of French citizens do not believe in God or consider Christianity to be irrelevant. People who identified as Catholic declined from 81% in 1986 to 47% in 2020, while the number of people who identified as not religious rose from 16% to 40%. In 2021, around 50% of all French respondents identified as Christians.

=== Germany ===
In 2024, it was estimated that about 48% of the German population were Christians. About 45% were members of the two large Christian churches. Attendance and membership in both Catholic and Protestant churches in Germany have been declining for several decades. In 2021, for the first time, fewer than half of German citizens belonged to the two larger churches.

As of 2026, the percentage of people who identify as non religious stands at 48.1%. From year 2024 onwards, the non religious cohort has outnumbered the combined numbers of both the catholic and protestant churches. Eastern parts of Germany are much less religious than western parts due to the legacy of imposed state atheism in East Germany.

=== Hungary ===
According to the national census, Christianity is declining in Hungary. Between 1992 and 2022, Christianity declined from 92.9% to 42.5% (Catholicism from 67.8% to 29.2%). In 2022, only 35.5% of people with age group 30-39 identified as Christians, the number further dropping to 32.8% of people with age group 20–29. Among Catholics, only 12% regularly attend church. On the other hand, a series of surveys conducted by Pew Research Center in 2018 found that the share of Christians has remained fairly stable in Hungary (75% who say they were raised Christian versus 76% who say they are Christian now).

=== Ireland ===
Catholicism remains the predominant religion in the Republic of Ireland. In the 2022 census, 75.7% of the population identified as Christian. However, recent social changes, including the lifting of a ban on abortion and the legalizing of same-sex marriage, have accelerated a shift toward more secular or liberal attitudes in Ireland, particularly within younger demographics. This increased secularization is exemplified when comparing mass attendance, weekly Mass attendance stood at 81% in 1990; this dropped to 48% by 2006. This process is characterized by scholars as a move toward a "Post-Catholic" state, i.e. one from where traditional Catholicism, which held a "monopoly on the Irish religious market" and had a strong relationship with state power, is being displaced.

An Irish priest, Fr. Kevin Hegarty, asserted in 2018 that the church's authority was undermined by the papal encyclical, called Humanae Vitae, that established the Church's opposition to contraception. He reported that there is only one priest under the age of 40 in the entire diocese of Killala; only two priests have been ordained over the last 17 years, and there have been no candidates for the priesthood since 2013. Hegarty blames this decline on the Church's positions on female ordination, contraception and sexuality. A continued requirement for children entering Irish Catholic-owned schools to be baptized keeps the overall level of baptisms high, though the number of individuals practicing a faith or attending church is decreasing.

Problems arising from the sexual abuse of children and the historical persecution of single mothers and their families have also greatly contributed to the decline of Catholicism in Ireland. The clerical scandals and the poor handling of them damaged the Churches credibility.

=== Netherlands ===
Former Calvinist church, now Longquan Temple of Great Compassion (Longquan Tempel van Groot Mededogen), of Chinese Buddhism, in Zuilen, Utrecht, Netherlands.

The Netherlands has tolerated greater religious diversity among Christian sects than Scandinavian countries, where "automatism" (default registration in the Lutheran Church by birth) has been the norm. Non-denominationalism increased in the Netherlands during the 19th century. This process slowed between the 1930s and 1960s, after which non-denominational affiliation increased. The Church's ministry to the poor was not needed in the modern Netherlands that had developed systems of government welfare and secular charity. The declining influence of religious institutions in public life allowed great religious, philosophical and theological pluralism in the private and individual spheres of Dutch society. During the 1960s and 1970s, pillarization weakened as people became less religious. In 1971, 39% of the Dutch population were Roman Catholics; by 2014, its share of the population had dropped to 23.3% (church-reported KASKI data), or 23.7% (large sample survey by Statistics Netherlands in 2015). The proportion of adherents of Calvinism and Methodism declined in the same period from 31% to 15.5%.

In 2015, Statistics Netherlands, the government institute that gathers statistical information about the Netherlands, found that Christians made up 43.8% of the total population. With only 49.9% of the Dutch in 2015 adhering to a religion, the Netherlands is one of the least religious countries of the European Union, after the Czech Republic and Estonia. By the 1980s, religion had largely lost its influence on Dutch politics, and as a result, Dutch policy on women's rights, abortion, euthanasia, homosexuality and prostitution became very liberal in the 1980s and 1990s. Subsequently, the two major strands of Calvinism, the Dutch Reformed Church and the Reformed Churches in the Netherlands and a small Lutheran group, began to cooperate as the Samen op weg Kerken ('Together on the road churches'). In 2004, these churches merged to form the Protestant Church in the Netherlands.

In 2015, an opinion survey found that 63% of Dutch people thought that religion did more harm than good. A quarter of the people thought that morality would be threatened if no one believed in God, down from 40% in 2006. The number of people reporting that they never pray rose from 36% in 2006 to 53% in 2016. In 2015, Statistics Netherlands found that 50.1% of the adult population declared no religious affiliation.

=== Poland ===
In 2021 Polish census, 71.3% of Polish people identified as Catholic, although 20.53% refused to answer the question about their religion. A 2022 poll showed that 84% of Polish people identify as Catholic, but only 42% are practicing Catholics, and among 18- to 24-year-olds only 23% are practicing Catholics, compared to 69% in 1992. The Catholic sex abuse scandal and the large restrictions on abortions in Poland contributed to this decline in Catholicism among the younger generations.

As of 2026, Poland has become the fastest secularizing country in the world. According to data from the national polling institute CBOS, regular religious practise among young Poles aged 18 - 24 plunged from 69% in 1992 down to just 23% 2021.

=== Portugal ===
In the 2021 census, 84,77% of the population adhered to christianity with catholicism being the dominant type of christianity. At the same time, non religious affiliation has increased from 6.8% in the 2011 census to 14.1% in 2021.

=== Italy and Spain ===
While daily church attendance has declined, but Catholicism still remains the predominant religion in both Spain and Italy. However, according to the Spanish Center for Sociological Research, 55.6% of Spaniards self-identified as Catholic in 2023, but only 18.3% claimed to be "practicing" Catholics.

In 2026, a survey of 4,020 people made by CIS had revealed an increase in irreligiosity which stood at 41.1% (17% atheist, 13% agnostic, 11.1% indifferent or no religion) while Catholicism stood at 54.3% (36.3% are non practising and only 18% are practising Catholics).

In Italy, about 68% of 1,000 participants aged 18 to 75 in a 2023 poll by Ipsos self-identified as "Christians". However, although most of the population claims religious affiliations, (Note: The ISTAT (the National Institute of Statistics), in surveying a whole range of news about the daily life of the population each year, also includes the question "Habitually how often do you go to church or other place of worship?", while it does not record religious affiliation, which is considered a "sensitive" data.) according to the Italian National Institute of Statistics (ISTAT) data, less than 19% (Note: In the last survey year (2022), regular practice involves 15% of the male population and 22% of the female population in Italy.) of Italians have declared themselves to be practicing. While the proportion of those who have never practiced a religion has doubled, from 16% in 2001 to 31% in 2022. However, polling from Eurobarometer in 2021 showed that while the overall number of Christians in Italy slightly decreased between 2018 and 2021 (from 85.6% in 2018 to 84.4% in 2021), the number of non-religious people also slightly decreased (from 11.7% in 2018 to 11.6% in 2021) while the number of Catholics (from 78.9% in 2018 to 79.2% in 2021) and other religious affiliations (from 2.6% in 2018 to 3.2% in 2021) increased.

=== United Kingdom ===
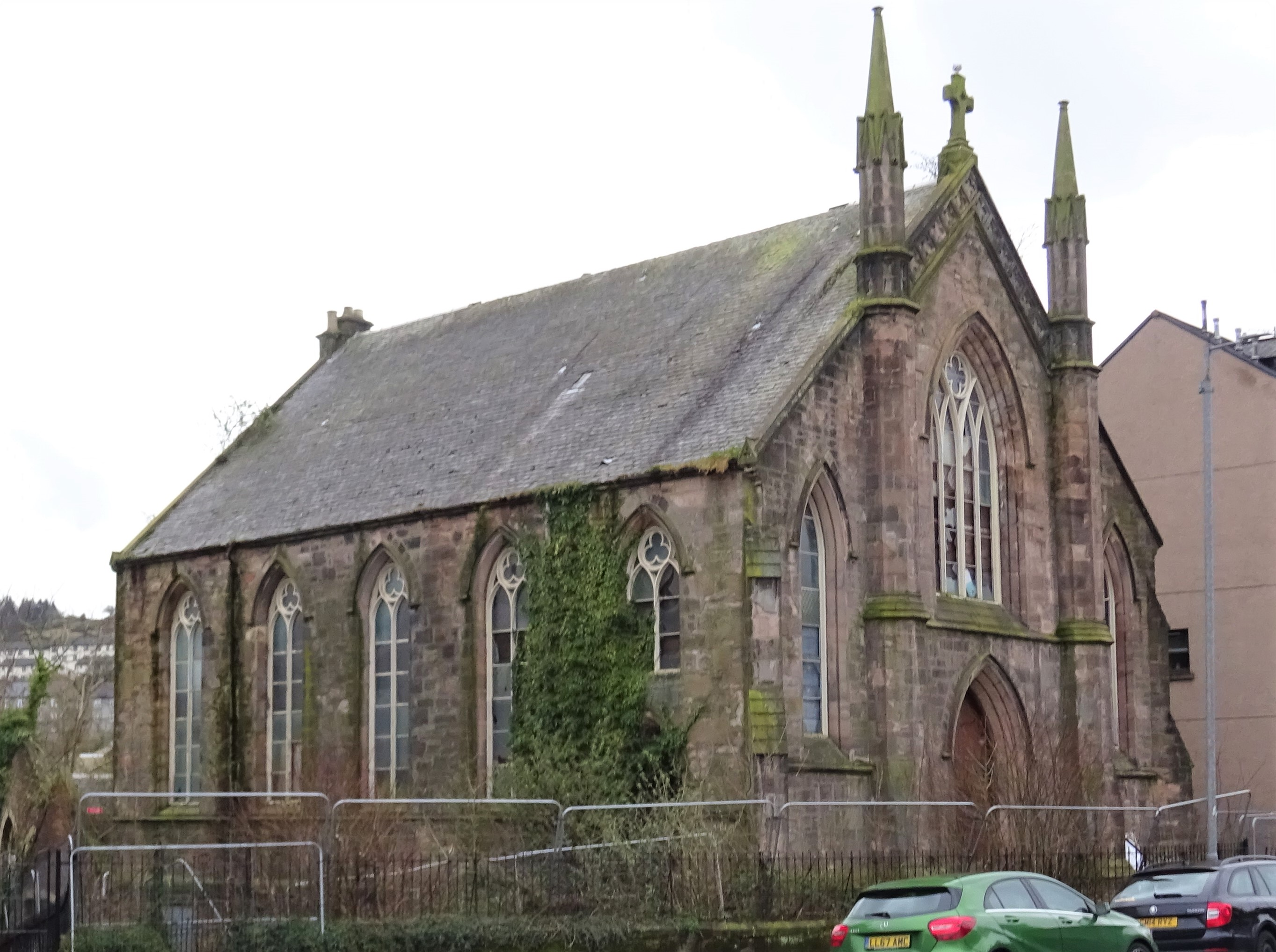
Abandoned church in Greenock, Scotland.

Former St. Mark Anglican church, now Peckham Mosque, in Camberwell, Southwark, London, England.

In the 2021 census in England and Wales, 46.2% of the population identified as Christian. Around 37.2% of the population identified as irreligious.

Attendance at Anglican churches had begun to decline in the United Kingdom by the Edwardian era, with both membership in mainstream churches and attendance at Sunday schools declining. Infant baptism declined after World War II. In 2014, Archbishop of Canterbury Rowan Williams stated that the UK had become a "post-Christian country". That same year, only 4.3% of the population participated in a Church of England (C of E) Christmas service. Nevertheless, around 60% of all respondents still identified as Christians in the 2011 Census.

The Roman Catholic Church has witnessed the highest retention rate among all Christian denominations. In 2015, 9.2% of the UK population was Catholic. According to scholar Stephen Bullivant, based on the British Social Attitudes Survey and European Social Survey, the decline in Anglicanism has slowed thanks to "the return of patriotism and pride in Christianity", and the number of followers of the Anglican Church has increased slightly by 2017. This growth, however, is still below that needed and is mainly from African immigrants. Anglicanism has been majority African since 2001. In 2017, a report commissioned by the Christian group Hope Revolution indicated that 21% of British youth identified as "active followers of Jesus".

According to the 2018 British Social Attitudes Survey (BSA), 33% of over-75s identified as C of E, while only 1% of people aged 18−24 did so. The report stated that "Britain is becoming more secular not because adults are losing their religion but because older people with an attachment to the C of E and other Christian denominations are gradually being replaced in the population by younger unaffiliated people."

In the 2022 Scotland census, for the first time, a majority of people stated that they did not identify with any religion—51.1%, up from 36.7% in 2011.

== Oceania ==
=== Australia ===
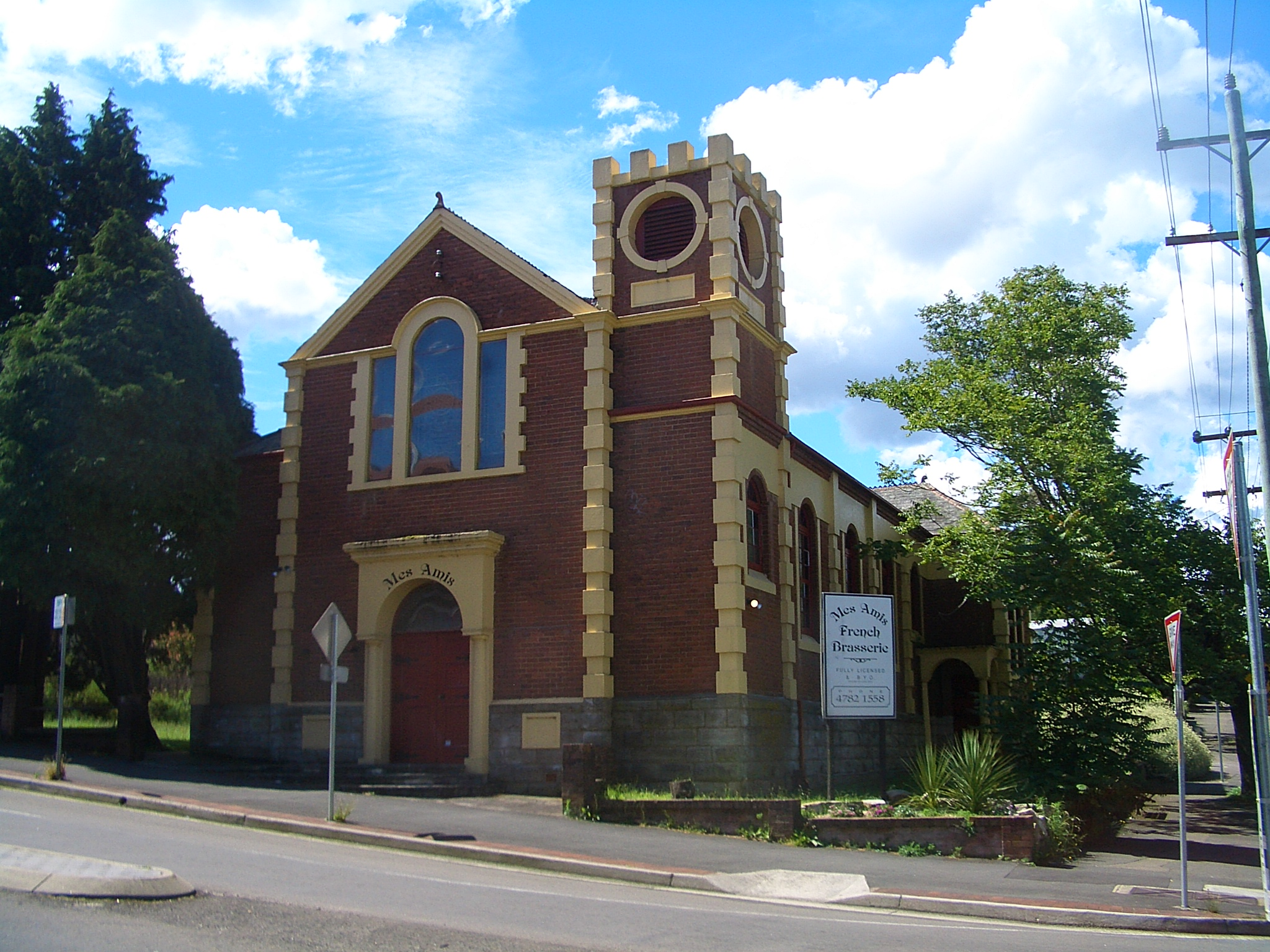
A deconsecrated church in Australia, now in use as a restaurant.

Australia was a Christian majority nation, but lost the status between 2010-20s. The percentage of people belonging to some form of Christianity decreased from 52.2% in the 2016 Census to 43.9% in the 2021 Census. Meanwhile, those declaring that they had no religion increased from 30% in the 2016 Census to 38.9% in the 2021 Census. In a 2017 survey of teenage Australians aged 13–18, 52% declared that they had no religion, compared with 38% Christian, 3% Muslim, 2% Buddhist and 1% Hindu.

In 2016 Census, the Pentecostal church was only form of Christianity to show growth, rising from 1.7% in 2011 to 2.1%. However, like other forms of Christianity, it also has declined in 2021 Census.

=== New Zealand ===
Trends in Religious Affiliation of New Zealand Across the Last Five Censuses (2001–2023).

In New Zealand, there has been a significant decrease in Christianity and increase in the population declaring "No religious affiliation". The reason for this is attributed to the decline in belief in institutional religion and increase in secularism.

In the 1991 census, 20.2% of the New Zealand population followed "No religion". This share more than doubled over the next two decades, reaching 41.9% in 2013 and rising further to 48.2% in 2018. By the 2023 Census, it had climbed to 51.6%, surpassing the 50% mark for the first time. At the same time, the Christian population declined from 47.65% in 2013 Census to 37.31% in 2018 Census and finally 32.3% in 2023 Census. In the 2018 Census, the New Zealand population claiming "No religion" officially overtook Christianity.

In 2008, Research by the Bible Society of New Zealand indicated that only 15% of Christians attend church at least once a week, and 20% attend at least once a month.

== North America ==
=== Canada ===
Percentage of Christians per Canadian province or territory based on 2021 Census data 80-89.9% Christian 70-79.9% Christian 60-69.9% Christian 50-59.9% Christian 40-49.9% Christian 30-39.9% Christian

In 2021, Statistics Canada found that only 68% of Canadians 15 years and older reported having a religious affiliation, marking the first time the number had dipped below 70% since StatCan began tracking religious affiliation in 1985. Christianity remains the largest religion in Canada; in the 2021 census, 53.3% of the population identified as Christians.

In Quebec, since the Quiet Revolution, over 500 churches (20% of the total) have been closed or converted for non-worship–based uses. In the 1950s, 95% of Quebec's population went to Mass; in the present day, that number is closer to 5%. Despite the decline in church attendance, Christianity remains the largest religion in Quebec, where 64.82% of people were Christians, according to 2021 census.

With the loss of Christianity's monopoly after having once been central and integral to Canadian culture and daily life, Canada has become a post-Christian and secular state.

=== Mexico ===
Although Mexico is the second largest Catholic country in the world in terms of members, Catholicism has been declining over the past 30 years, from 89.7% of the population in 1990 to 77.7% in 2020. The number of Catholics in Mexico have decreased by 20.5% since 1950. In 2020, 8.1% of Mexicans did not identify with any religion.

The National Institute of Statistics and Geography (INEGI) reported that the number of evangelicals or Protestants rose from 4.9% in 1990 to 5.2% in 2000, reaching 7.6% in 2010, and 11.7% in 2020. The Institute estimates that 20 million Mexicans are evangelical. More than 17 million Mexicans are Pentecostal and Charismatic. There 8 million Christians independent from denominations in Mexico.

=== United States ===
Christianity, the largest religion in the United States, experienced a 20th-century high of 91% of the total population in 1976. This declined to 73.7% by 2016 and 64% in 2022. The Evangelical Lutheran Church in America (ELCA) lost about 30% of its congregation and closed 12.5% of its churches: the United Methodist church lost 16.7% of its congregation and closed 10.2% of its churches. The Presbyterian Church had the sharpest decline, losing over 40% of its congregation and 15.4% of its churches between 2000 and 2015. Infant baptism has also decreased; nationwide, Catholic baptisms declined by nearly 34%, and ELCA baptisms by over 40%. As of 2024, Christianity's decline may have leveled off or slowed, according to the Pew Research Center and Gallup, though according to the Public Religion Research Institute, it has continued to decline.

In a study published in 2022, Pew Research Center projected that if the rate of decline continued to accelerate, Christians would make up less than half of the American population by 2070, with estimated ranges for that year falling between 35% and 46% of the American population. In 2024, Pew Research Center published a study stating that the percentage of American adults who identify as religiously unaffiliated, known as "nones", numbered 28%, higher than Catholics at 23% and Evangelical Protestants at 24%. However, Pew reported in 2025 that Christianity's decline has begun to "slow…or level off." Some speculate that a revival of Christianity has begun in the U.S.

In 2019, 65% of American adults described themselves as Christians. In 2020, 47% of Americans said that they belonged to a church, down from 70% in 1999; this was the first time that a poll found less than half of Americans belonging to a church. Nationwide Catholic membership increased between 2000 and 2017, but the number of churches declined by nearly 11% and by 2019, the number of Catholics decreased by 2 million people, dropping from 23% of the population to 21%. Since 1970, weekly church attendance among Catholics has dropped from 55% to 20%, the number of priests declined from 59,000 to 35,000 and the number of people who left Catholicism increased from under 2 million in 1975 to over 30 million today.

In 2022, there were fewer than 42,000 nuns in the United States, a 76% decline over 50 years, with fewer than 1% of nuns under age 40. The Southern Baptist Convention has experienced decline: between 2006 and 2020, it lost 2.3 million members, representing a 14% decrease in membership during that period. Sexual abuse cases in Southern Baptist churches has been cited as a contributing factor. The Lutheran Church – Missouri Synod reported in 2021 that the denomination has been declining in membership. In 2020, the church reported approximately 1.8 million total baptized members, a decline from its peak in 1971 when it reported nearly 2.8 million total baptized members.

The 2014 Religious Landscape Study found a large majority of those who were raised as Christians in the United States still identify as such (retention rate of 87.6% among those raised Christian), while those who no longer identify as Christians mostly identify as religiously unaffiliated. More recent studies have found a retention rate closer to 67%, with one-third of those who were Christian in childhood leaving the religion by age 30. The 2014 study found that 84% of all adults who were raised as historically Black Protestant continue to identify as such or identify now with different Christian denominations, Evangelical Protestant (81%), Mormon (76%), Catholic (75%), Orthodox Christian (73%), mainline Protestant (70%), and Jehovah's Witnesses (62%) continue to identify as such or identify now with different Christian denominations. Significant minorities of those raised in nearly all Christian denominational families now say they are unaffiliated, ranging from 13% among those raised historically Black Protestant to 35% of those raised Jehovah's Witnesses. A small minority of those raised in nearly all Christian denominational families identify now with another faith, ranging from 3% among those raised historically Black Protestant, Evangelical Protestant, Mormon, Orthodox Christian, and Jehovah's Witnesses to 4% of those raised Catholic and mainline Protestant. A 2022 Pew Research study found that 30% of Latinos in the United States were religiously unaffiliated, and half of Latinos age 18–29 were religiously unaffiliated.

Moderate and liberal denominations in the United States have been closing down churches at a rate three or four times greater than the number of new churches being consecrated. However, according to The Christian Century, the rate of annual closures is approximately 1% and quite low relative to other types of institutions. It has been asserted that of the approximately 3,700 churches that close each year, up to half are unsuccessful new churches. The more conservative evangelical denominations have also declined, representing 23% of the population in 2006 and 14% in 2020 according to the Public Religion Research Institute.

The Public Religion Research Institute's 2020 Census of American Religion showed that the overall decline of white Christians in America had slowed, stabilizing at around 44% of the population. It also showed that, contrary to expectations, white evangelicals had continued to decline and that they were now outnumbered by white mainline Protestants. Conversely, the Pew Research Center found in 2022 that the decline had continued to accelerate over the previous fifty years.

== South America ==
Post-Columbian South America saw domination by a 'Catholic monopoly', with the Roman Catholic Church exercising strong influence over religious, social, and political life. In recent decades, however, scholars have described the region's religious landscape as having shifted toward a more competitive and pluralistic 'religious marketplace'. While Christianity remains the dominant religion, the region has experienced a significant decline in the proportion of Catholics, a surge in Evangelical and Pentecostal movements, and a notable rise in the non-religious population.

Some scholars have described the Catholic Church in this time and place as a kind of 'complacent monopolist', depending heavily on cultural traditions and legal protections rather than putting much effort into active evangelization to retain its followers. Between 1996 and 2026, the proportion of Catholics declined in nearly all South American countries, with the sharpest drops recorded in Uruguay, Brazil, Chile, Argentina and Colombia.

Although South America remains overwhelmingly Christian, the number of people who say they have no religious affiliation (irreligion) has grown noticeably, especially in the Southern Cone. Sociologists debate whether this represents real secularization or simply people drifting away from institutional religion. Some argue that even as the official Church weakens, Christian religiosity and its worldview still shapes everyday life for many.

Uruguay stands out as the most secular country in the region. Between 1996 and 2013, the proportion of irreligious people there rose from about 18% to 38%. Around the year 2020, Uruguay became the first country in South America to become majority non-religious, with 52.4% professing no faith. Chile has seen a similar trend, and according to the official 2024 census released by the National Institute of Statistics (INE), 25.8% of the population reported having no religion or belief system. Researchers largely trace this shift to younger generations being much less religious than their parents.

=== Argentina ===
As of 2026, around 58% of people in Argentina profess Catholicism, down from 76.5% in 2004. Irreligiosity grew from 12% to 19% in 9 years. According to a report from the University of Buenos Aires, as of 2026, 57.7% of Argentines identified as Catholic, 22.4% as irreligious, and 17.4% as Protestant, giving Catholics and Protestants a combined share of 75.1% of the population.

A 2019 survey conducted online by the Universidad de San Andrés showed that 76% of Argentinians believed in God (a decrease from 91% in 2008), 44% believed in heaven, 32% believed in hell, around 29% prayed daily, only 13% attended religious services weekly and about 24% regarded religion as very important in their lives.

However, affiliation with Protestant churches has increased; as of 2019, Protestantism in Argentina was around 15.3%, up from 9% in 2004. While Pentecostal churches originally attracted mostly the lower class, they show an increasing appeal to the urban middle-class. Middle-class congregations develop a distinctive style of Pentecostalism, more adapted to society.

=== Chile ===
Cases of sexual abuse, attempts to hide information, and interference in government affairs are suggested as principal causes of the decline of Christianity in Chile. According to the public broadcaster TVN, the number of Chileans who declare themselves Catholics fell from 73% in 2008 to 45% in 2018. In addition, Chile is the Latin American country that has least trust (36%) in the Church (according to Latinobarómetro). As of 2019, 63% of the Chilean population professed some branch of Christianity, according to the Encuesta Nacional Bicentenario, with an estimated 45% of Chileans declaring themselves part of the Catholic Church and 18% of Pentecostal churches. 5% of the population adhere to other religions. According to the 2024 Chilean census, Christians made up 73.1% of the population, including 54.0% Catholics, 16.3% Protestants, and 2.8% other Christians. Those with no religion accounted for 25.8%, while 0.9% belonged to other religions.

Attempts to restore the Roman Catholic Christian faith in Chile have failed. The Argentine newspaper Clarín reported that Pope Francis's state visit to Chile in 2018 "had been the worst in his five years of pontificate". After the papal visit, the crisis in the Chilean Catholic Church increased. According to the Bicentenario survey, atheism grew from 21% in 2018 to 32% in 2019 and then to 36% in 2020 and 37% in 2021. Despite the decline of Roman Catholic Church, Pentecostalism still maintains the same percentage of adherents since 2012.

=== Uruguay ===
Uruguay is one of the world's most secular nations. A study from 2019 indicated that almost 44.5% of Uruguayans are religiously unaffiliated. Around the year 2020 Uruguay became the first country in South America to become majority non-religious, with 52.4% professing no faith.

== East Asia ==
=== Japan ===
Although the presence of christianity dates back to 16th century, the total percentage share of christianity is just 1% to 1.5% of the entire Japanese population, while a 2023 survey by the Pew Research Center, published in 2024, found that 2% of Japanese adults identified as Christian.

The non religious population makes up an estimated 50% to 75% (depending on the wording in surveys). However, even through the Japanese society is heavily secular, most still do practise at least some forms of their native traditions of Buddhism and Shintoism.

While the percentage share of christianity is expected to stay roughly the same in the following decades, the total number of christians is projected to decrease due to demographic crisis. However, many analysts point out that foreign born nationals from countries like the Philippines or Vietnam will make up larger share of christians in Japan in the future as the native population shrinks. Christian churches are also facing acute shortages of priests.

=== South Korea ===
Between 1950 and 1962, Christians accounted for approximately 5% of South Korea's population. In 2025, christianity in South Korea was around 31%. Protestantism, the more practised form of christianity, was around 20% while catholicism was 11%. Non religiosity sat around 51% and is expected to increase in the future. According to the Pew Research Center, 42% of South Korean adults who currently identify as Christian were raised outside Christianity, most commonly as Buddhists or with no religious affiliation.

South Korea is suffering from the worst demographic crisis in the world. The total fertility rate sits at just 0.8 children per woman.

Moreover, young people report much higher shares of non religiosity than any other previous generation. Non religiosity among Generation Z reaches up to 76% while only 24% report having religious beliefs.

=== Taiwan ===
Christianity constituted 7% of the population, according to Taiwan's 2023 census, while additional estimates put the christian population also at around 7%. According to the same census, some 27% of Taiwanese are non religious. Non religious are the fastest growing affiliation and its growth is significantly skewed towards younger cohorts.

Taiwan, like other countries in East Asia, is suffereing from a demographic crisis and the population is currently on the decline.

As of 2026, Taiwan's Catholic community reports a severe youth exodus over rigid institucional stances on modern societal issues, such as LGBTQ+ rights equality.

== Statistics ==
Christian percentage in Western countries (2010–20) per Pew Research Center
Country	Christian percentage	
Country	2010	2020
United States	78.3	64.0
Germany	62.2	56.2
United Kingdom	62.4	49.4
France	57.1	46.5
Italy	88.5	80.5
Spain	78.6	69.5
Canada	67.2	53.3
Poland	97.3	91.2
Australia	67.1	46.8
Netherlands	42.7	35.1
Belgium	61.1	51.0
Czech Republic	30.0	26.4
Portugal	91.8	85.1
Hungary	72.6	72.4
Sweden	72.8	60.8
Austria	80.4	68.2
Switzerland	73.3	61.6
Denmark	80.2	76.9
Finland	81.8	72.3
Slovakia	75.1	73.7
Norway	78.8	71.4
New Zealand	49.1	40.3
Croatia	93.7	90.9
Lithuania	92.5	92.2
Slovenia	72.4	65.4
Estonia	61.2	52.6
Luxembourg	74.4	65.9
Malta	97.1	88.6

According to the 2025 Pew survey, Christianity ceased to be the majority faith in the United Kingdom, Australia, France, and Uruguay, where it had previously been the dominant religion.

== See also ==
- Church attendance
- Confessing Movement
- God is dead
- Irreligion
- Pentecostalism
- Postchristianity
- Secularization
