= Gretchen Morgenson =

American journalist

- Born: Gretchen C. Morgenson; January 2, 1956 (age 70); State College, Pennsylvania, U.S.
- Education: St. Olaf College (BA)
- Occupation: Journalist
- Children: 1
- Awards: Pulitzer Prize for Beat Reporting (2002); Gerald Loeb Award (2009)

Gretchen C. Morgenson (born January 2, 1956) is an American journalist notable as longtime writer of the Market Watch column for the Sunday "Money & Business" section of The New York Times. In November, 2017, she moved from the Times to The Wall Street Journal. She won a Pulitzer Prize in 2002 for a series of investigative articles on various scandals in the finance world.

== Early life and education ==
Morgenson was born January 2, 1956, in State College, Pennsylvania. She graduated in 1976 from St. Olaf College in Northfield, Minnesota with a B.A. degree in English and History.

== Career ==
She worked as an assistant editor with Vogue magazine, eventually becoming a writer and financial columnist. In 1981 she co-authored the book The Woman's Guide to the Stock Market and that same year joined the Wall Street stockbrokerage, Dean Witter Reynolds where she remained until January 1984. She returned to writing on financial matters at Money magazine and in late 1986 accepted an offer from Forbes magazine to work as an editor and an investigative business writer. In mid-1993, she left Forbes magazine to become the executive editor at Worth magazine but in September 1995 took on the job of press secretary for the Presidential election campaign of Steve Forbes following which she was appointed assistant managing editor at Forbes magazine.

=== The New York Times ===
In May 1998, Morgenson became the assistant business and financial editor at The New York Times. She has written about the conflicts of interests between financial analysts and their employers who generate income money from the companies that the analysts assess.

Beginning in 2005, Morgenson has been focusing on executive compensation packages being paid by American companies that she asserts have reached levels far in excess of what can be justified to shareholders.

In 2006, Morgenson broke a story about a Wall Street analyst (Matthew Murray) who was fired shortly after he reported emails to Congress concerning potential violations of SEC regulation AC by the investment bank (Rodman & Renshaw) that he worked for at the time. The emails allegedly documented that the investment bank wouldn't let the analyst lower his rating, or have his name removed from coverage, of an investment banking client. A subsequent article by Morgenson highlighted a letter she obtained from the Senate Finance Committee in which Senator Grassley stated that the investment bank's chairman (General Wesley Clark) had acknowledged to his staff that the analyst had been fired from the investment bank as a result of reporting the emails to Congress. Rodman was subsequently fined $315,000 for “supervisory and other violations related to the interaction between the firm’s research and investment banking functions.”

In 2009, The Nation called Morgenson "The Most Important Financial Journalist of Her Generation". In 2002 she won the Pulitzer Prize for her "trenchant and incisive" coverage of Wall Street. She has appeared on Bill Moyers Journal, and Charlie Rose.

=== The Wall Street Journal ===
In November, 2017, Wall Street Journal investigations editor Michael Siconolfi announced that Morgenson was joining the paper's investigative team as a senior special writer, working closely also with reporters in the money and investing group and the financial enterprise group.

=== NBC News ===
In December 2019, Morgenson left the Wall Street Journal to become senior financial reporter in NBC News's Investigations unit.

== Personal life ==
She is married, has a son and lives in New York City.

== Awards ==
- 2009: Gerald Loeb Award for Beat Writing for "Wall Street"
- 2009: Gerld Loeb Award for Large Newspapers for "The Reckoning"
- 2003: Matrix Awards Hall of Fame Newspapers
- 2002: Pulitzer Prize for Beat Reporting "for her trenchant and incisive Wall Street coverage."
- 2002: Gerald Loeb Award for Commentary

== Bibliography ==
- The Woman's Guide to the Stock Market, Barbara Lee, Gretchen Morgenson, Harmony Books, 1982, ISBN 978-0-517-54622-2
- Forbes Great Minds Of Business, John Wiley, 1997, ISBN 978-0-471-19652-5
- The Capitalist's Bible: The Essential Guide to Free Markets—And Why They Matter to You, HarperCollins, 2009 ISBN 978-0-06-156098-9
- Reckless Endangerment: How Outsized Ambition, Greed, and Corruption Led to Economic Armageddon, with Joshua Rosner, Times Books, 2011, ISBN 0-8050-9120-3
- These are the Plunderers: How Private Equity Runs—and Wrecks—America, Simon & Schuster, 2023, ISBN 978-1-98-219128-3
