= These Are the Plunderers =

Book written by Gretchen Morgenson with Joshua Rosner

These Are the Plunderers: How Private Equity Runs—and Wrecks—America
- Author: Gretchen Morgenson and Joshua Rosner
- Language: English
- Publisher: Scribner
- Publication date: June 20, 2024
- Publication place: United States
- ISBN: 978-1-982-19129-0

These Are the Plunderers: How Private Equity Runs—and Wrecks—America is a book written by American journalist Gretchen Morgenson, along with Joshua Rosner, published by Simon & Schuster.

The book details the activities of Private equity (PE) firms in the United States, with an emphasis on what the authors describe as the negative consequences of PE such corporate restructuring, asset stripping, its influence on employment, public service and institutional stability, with case studies on systemic economic consequences. The book investigates the perceived greed in PE and its negative effects on industries, paychecks, and the lives of everyday people.

In a review of the book, Ronald Moy stated the authors' case is slanted or incomplete: "the authors are not interested in presenting the industry’s good, bad, and ugly sides — just the latter two."
