= God Is Back =

2009 book by John Micklethwait and Adrian Wooldridge

- Title page for God Is Back: How the Global Revival of Faith Is Changing the World (2009)
- Author: John Micklethwait; Adrian Wooldridge
- Language: English
- Published: Penguin Press
- Publication date: 2009
- Publication place: United States

God Is Back: How the Global Revival of Faith Is Changing the World is a 2009 book by John Micklethwait and Adrian Wooldridge which argues against the secularization thesis and claims that there is a global revival of faith has started in the late twentieth century.

Micklethwait and Wooldridge provided a quick coverage of American history, in which they argue that American religion was dramatically transformed by the disestablishment of churches after the American Revolution. An emerging "free market" of religious choices led Americans to become increasingly pluralistic and tolerant of other forms of Christianity. The voluntary nature of religious association led Americans to take ownership of their own institutions and churches, helping create a democratic sense of responsibility for creating associations and community. These features of American culture, along with the First Amendment's separation of church and state, ensured that American religions could only survive by appealing to the common people. This democratized American Christianity, leading average Americans to shape religious movements themselves. In the post-Revolutionary period, all this led America in an increasingly pluralist and democratic direction.

Micklethwait and Wooldridge argue that the religions growing around the world tend to exhibit these same features. World religions—and Christianity, in particular—are growing fastest where they are: competing with other religious alternatives, unsupported by state governments, and entirely dependent upon popular interest. Writing against the fear that the growth of religion will increase warfare and strife, Micklethwait and Wooldridge argue that a democratic and pluralistic culture would help minimize these dangers while maximizing the benefits of religion. Finally, while the authors suggest that Islam too could be modernized and introduced to a pluralistic culture, they suspect that Islam is less amenable for this transition than Christianity.

Kirkus Reviews called it "A meaningful contribution to the ongoing conversation about the place of faith in modern life."
