= John Micklethwait =

English journalist (born 1962)

Richard John Micklethwait CBE (born 11 August 1962) is an English journalist who is the editor-in-chief of Bloomberg News, a position he has held since February 2015. He was previously the editor-in-chief of The Economist from 2006 to 2015.

== Early life ==
Micklethwait was born in 1962, in London, and was educated at Ampleforth College (an independent school) and Magdalen College, Oxford, where he studied history.

== Career ==
Micklethwait worked for Chase Manhattan Bank for two years and joined The Economist in 1987. Prior to becoming editor-in-chief, he was U.S. editor of the publication and ran the New York Bureau for two years. Before that, he edited the Business Section of the newspaper for four years. Micklethwait's other roles have included setting up an office in Los Angeles for The Economist, where he worked from 1990 to 1993. He has covered business and politics from the United States, Latin America, Continental Europe, Southern Africa, and Asia.

Appointed as editor-in-chief in March 2006, the first issue of The Economist published under his editorship was released on 7 April 2006. He was named Editors' Editor by the British Society of Magazine Editors in 2010. Micklethwait has frequently appeared on CNN, ABC News, BBC, C-SPAN, PBS and NPR.

In 2015, Micklethwait was appointed as a Trustee of the British Museum. He was also a delegate, along with two colleagues, at the 2010 Bilderberg Conference held in Spain. This group consists of an assembly of notable politicians, industrialists and financiers who meet annually to discuss issues on a non-disclosure basis.

Micklethwait was appointed Commander of the Order of the British Empire (CBE) in the 2016 Birthday Honours for services to journalism and economics.

In November 2019, Micklethwait ordered his staff not to investigate their boss, Michael Bloomberg (nor any other Democratic candidates) during Bloomberg's presidential campaign.

In October 2024, Micklethwait interviewed President-elect Donald Trump at the Economic Club of Chicago as Bloomberg's top editor.

== Personal life ==
In September 2024, Micklethwait married actress Kristin Scott Thomas after a five-year relationship.

== Bibliography ==
Micklethwait is the co-author of several books with Adrian Wooldridge, including:

- The Witch Doctors: Making Sense of the Management Gurus (1996)
- A Future Perfect: the Challenge and Hidden Promise of Globalisation (2000)
- The Company—A Short History of a Revolutionary Idea (2003)
- The Right Nation: A Study of Conservatism in America (2004)
- God is Back: How the Global Revival of Faith Is Changing the World (2009)
- The Fourth Revolution: The Global Race To Reinvent The State (2014)
- The Wake-Up Call: Why the Pandemic has Exposed the Weakness of the West, and How to Fix It (2020)

Media offices
Preceded by Bill Emmott	Editor of The Economist; 2006–2015	Succeeded by Zanny Minton Beddoes
