= Adrian Wooldridge =

British journalist and author (born 1959)

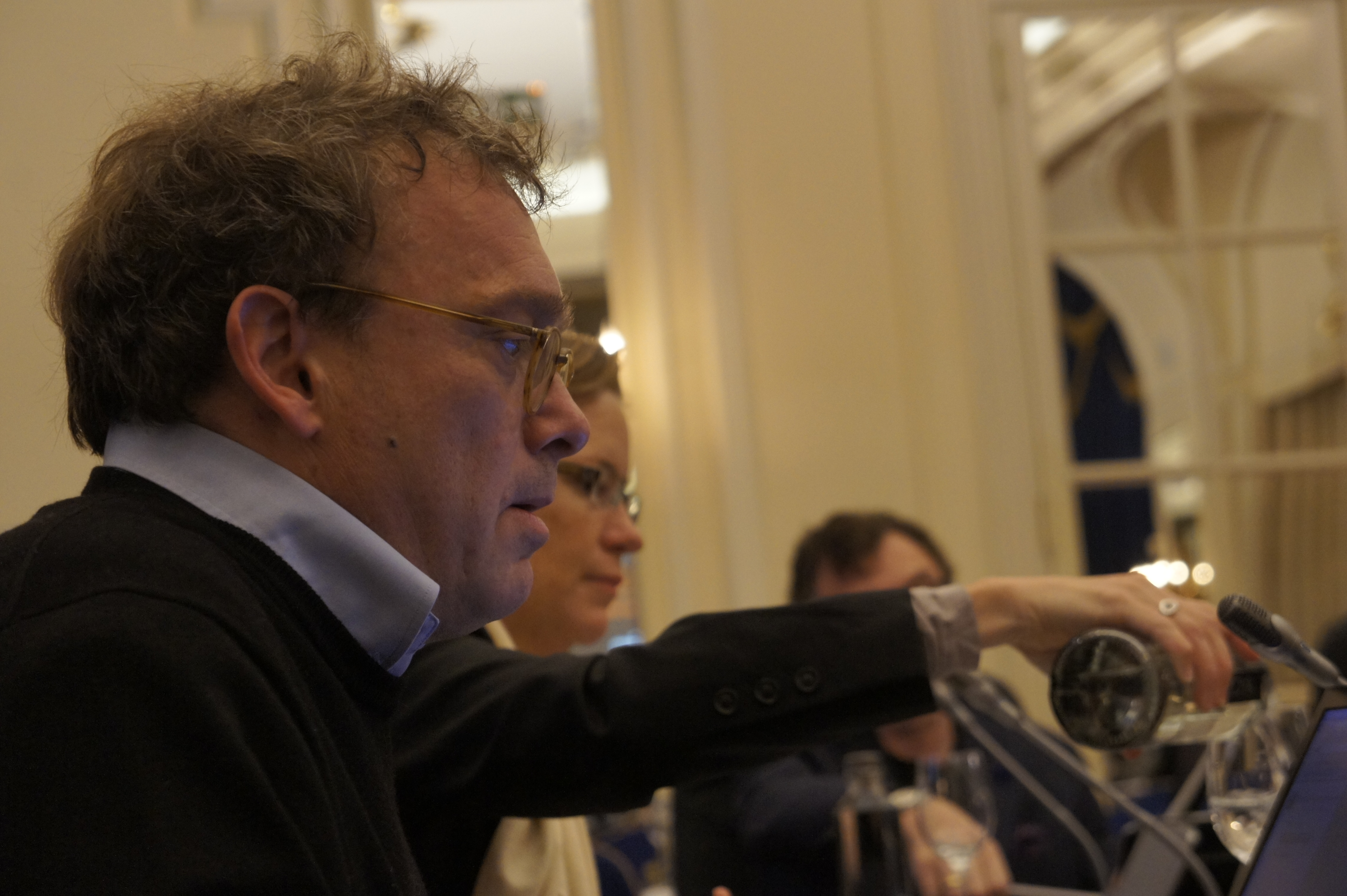
Adrian Wooldridge in 2011

Adrian Wooldridge (born 1959) is an author and columnist. He is the Global Business Columnist at Bloomberg Opinion.

== Life and career ==
Wooldridge was educated at Balliol College, Oxford, where he studied modern history and was awarded a fellowship at All Souls College, also at Oxford University, where he received a DPhil in 1985. From 1984 to 1985, he was also a Harkness Fellow at the University of California, Berkeley.

Wooldridge worked at The Economist weekly British newspaper for more than 20 years. He was The Economist's Washington bureau chief and the "Lexington" columnist, and the "Schumpeter" columnist (business, finance and management) until the end of 2016. As of June 2021, he was The Economist's political editor and "Bagehot" columnist, which was described as "an analysis of British life and politics, in the tradition of Walter Bagehot".

In September 2021, Wooldridge joined Bloomberg Opinion as the global business columnist.

== Bibliography ==
- Wooldridge, Adrian (1994). Measuring the Mind: Education and Psychology in England c. 1860–1990. Cambridge: Cambridge University Press. ISBN 9780521395151.
- — (18 April 2015). "Family companies (online:'To those that have')". Special Report. The Economist. Vol. 415, no. 8934.
- — (18 April 2015). "A very British business : some lessons from the success of Britain's elite private schools". Schumpeter. The Economist. Vol. 415, no. 8934. p. 56.
- Greenspan, Alan; Wooldridge, Adrian (2018). Capitalism in America: A History. New York: Penguin Press.
- — (2021). The Aristocracy of Talent: How Meritocracy Made the Modern World. Penguin. ISBN 9780241391501. The Times Book of the Year.
- — (2026). Centrists of the World Unite!: The Lost Genius of Liberalism. Allen Lane. ISBN 9780241758700.

Co-written (with John Micklethwait):

- The Witch Doctors: Making Sense of the Management Gurus (1996)
- A Future Perfect: The Challenge and Promise of Globalization (2000)
- The Company: A Short History of a Revolutionary Idea (2003)
- The Right Nation: Conservative Power in America (2004)
- God Is Back: How the Global Revival of Faith Is Changing the World (2009)
- The Fourth Revolution: The Global Race to Reinvent the State (2014)
- The Wake-Up Call: Why the Pandemic Has Exposed the Weakness of the West, and How to Fix It (2020)

== Awards ==
- 2017 Gerald Loeb Award for Commentary for "Creative Destruction: The Schumpeter Column"
