= Gerald Loeb Award winners for Columns, Commentary, and Editorials =

American journalism award

The Gerald Loeb Award for Distinguished Business and Financial Journalism is given annually for multiple categories of business reporting. The category "Editorials" was awarded in 1970–1972, "Columns/Editorial" in 1974–1976, "Columns" in 1977, "Columns/Editorial" again in 1978–1982, "Editorial/Commentary" in 1983–1984, and "Commentary" in 1985 onwards.

== Gerald Loeb Award for Editorials (1970–1972) ==
- 1970: Patricia Shontz, The Detroit News

Editorial Series:

"Today's Economy", 1969

- 1971: Philip Greer, The Washington Post

Editorials in Series:
1. "Wall Street Changes", December 20, 1970
2. "Wall Street Changes", December 21, 1970
3. "Wall Street Changes", December 22, 1970
4. "Wall Street Changes", December 23, 1970

- 1972: Robert H. Metz, The New York Times

Editorials in Series:
1. "Market Place: Why Wall St. Sold Wrigley", October 26, 1971
2. "Market Place: Price Swings: Limit Needed?", December 7, 1971
3. "Market Place: Market Drops: Another View", December 15, 1971
4. "Market Place: A Fresh Slant On Steep Dips", December 23, 1971
5. "MarketPlace: Dumping Stock: Some Solutions", December 31, 1971

== Gerald Loeb Award for Columns/Editorial (1973–1976, 1978–1982) ==
- 1973: "Wall Street" by Clem Morgello, Newsweek
- 1974: "Trust Busting the USA" by Henry Wallich, Newsweek
- 1975: "Pendulum of Power to Swing to Arabs?" by Edwin Darby, Chicago Sun Times
- 1976: "The Second Battle of Great Britain" by Joseph A. Livingston, The Philadelphia Inquirer

Columns in series:
1. "Britain Faces Second Battle", July 13, 1975
2. "Wage Freeze Pivotal in Second Battle of Britain", July 14, 1975
3. "Status of the Pound Shows Monetary Optimism", July 15, 1975
4. "Britain's Industrial Troubles Keep Growing Worse", July 16, 1975
5. "The 'Second Battle of Britain' Must Be Won, Too", July 17, 1975

- 1978: "IMF, World Bank Face Grave Issues" by Hobart Rowen, The Washington Post
- 1979: Robert L. Bartley, The Wall Street Journal
- 1980: "Investment Series: Gambling with Someone Else's Money" by Alan Gersten, Rocky Mountain News
- 1980: (Honorable Mention) "The Underpaid and Under-Protected" by Paul Lieberman and Chester Goolrick, The Atlanta Constitution

Their series of articles described widespread national minimum wage law violations in the state of Georgia.

Articles in series:
1. "Part I: The Turpentine Men: Hard Woods Toil For Little Pay", December 1, 1979
2. "For Many Americans, Work Pays Off In Poverty", December 1, 1979
3. "Endless Debt Haunts Turpentiners", December 2, 1979
4. "Naval Stores Ages-Old, but Few Like Living in Past", December 2, 1979
5. "Part III: No Golden Eggs In Georgia’s Chicken Sheds", December 3, 1979
6. "Motel Maid’s Wages Fall Into Crevice In The Law", December 4, 1979
7. "Unique Deductions Push Pay Below U.S. Minimum", December 4, 1979
8. "Over 40 Years, A Corporation’s Pattern Of Underpaying Workers", December 5, 1979
9. "Munford: ‘Minimum Wage A Tragic Thing", December 5, 1979
10. "They'd Rather Collect Weeds Than Welfare", December 6, 1979
11. "Wage Law Enforcers Overwhelmed By Complaints", December 6, 1979
12. "Beverly Worrell Has Done Battle 38 Years For Nation’s Underpaid", December 6, 1979

- 1980: (Honorable Mention) Tom Bethell, Harper's

Article:

"Fooling With the Budget", October 1979

- 1981: "How to Understand Inflation" by Sarai Ribicoff (posthumous), Los Angeles Herald Examiner
- 1981: (Honorable Mention) "Cable TV: Channels of Influence" by Stan DeCoster and Ann Baldelli, New London Day
- 1982 (tie): "Review & Outlook" by George Melloan, The Wall Street Journal
- 1982 (tie): "Selected Editorials" by Lester C. Thurow, Newsweek

== Gerald Loeb Award for Columns (1977) ==
- 1977: "Series on Pension Costs” by Lee Mitsang, The Associated Press

== Gerald Loeb Award for Editorial/Commentary (1983–1984) ==
- 1983: "Economic Focus" by Robert J. Samuelson, National Journal
- 1984: Robert L. Heilbroner, The New Yorker

Article:

"Economic Prospects", August 29, 1983

== Gerald Loeb Award for Commentary (1985–present) ==
- 1985: "Editorial Series" by Daniel Henninger, The Wall Street Journal

His editorial series discussed the international debt crisis, a letter on the U.S. economy by U.S. Catholic bishops, and bank failures.

- 1986 (tie): Michael Kinsley, The New Republic
- 1986 (tie): Robert Samuelson, Newsweek
- 1987: "Series of Editorials on Farm Policy" by Richard Doak, The Des Moines Register
- 1988: "Perspectives Columns" by Ron Ridenhour, New Orleans City Business
- 1988: (Honorable Mention) "Series of Editorials on the Texaco/Pennzoil Battle" by Gordon Crovitz, The Wall Street Journal
- 1989: "Selected Columns" by David Warsh, The Boston Globe

He was awarded for his "Economic Principles" column in The Boston Sunday Globe.

- 1990: "Columns on the Alleged Prosecutorial Abuses of the RICO Law" by L. Gordon Crovitz, The Wall Street Journal
- 1991: "Deals Columns" by Allan Sloan, Newsday
- 1992: "Selected Columns" by Warren T. Brookes (posthumously), The Detroit News
- 1993: "Deals Columns" by Allan Sloan, Newsday
- 1994: "Selected Columns" by Robert J. Samuelson, Newsweek
- 1995: "Selected Columns" by Jane Bryant Quinn, Newsweek
- 1996: "Selected Editorials" by Bill Bishop, Lexington Herald-Leader
- 1997: "Business World Columns" by Holman W. Jenkins Jr., The Wall Street Journal
- 1998: "Selected Columns" by Allan Sloan, Newsweek
- 1999: "Personal Technology Columns" by Walter S. Mossberg, The Wall Street Journal
- 2000: "Business and Technology Columns" by David Ignatius, The Washington Post
- 2001: "Floyd Norris Columns" by Floyd Norris, The New York Times

Norris was awarded "for his insightful columns educating investors about the complexities of Wall Street."

- 2002: "Market Watch" by Gretchen Morgenson, The New York Times

Columns:
1. "Hands Out, Even in a Time Of Crisis", November 4, 2001
2. "A Benefit For the Few Weighs On Many", February 25, 2001
3. "Employers Dodge a Bullet That Their Workers Can't", April 15, 2001
4. "A Company Tested And Found Wanting", June 17, 2001
5. "Warning Signs Fail to Shake True Believers' Faith", August 12, 2001
6. "Price Targets Are Hazardous to Investor's Wealth", August 5, 2001
7. "Take Away the Window Dressing, ans Who Will Buy?", September 2, 2001

- 2003: "Auto Industry Commentary" by Jerry Flint, Forbes

His bold, punchy, and entertaining essays on the auto industry expressed depth of knowledge while conveying new information.

Columns:
1. "Hydrogen Bomb", February 8, 2002
2. "Horror Story", June 14, 2002
3. "Money Isn't Everything", July 19. 2002
4. "Falling in Love, August 26, 2002
5. "A Death on Route 9", September 18, 2002

- 2004: "Golden State" by Michael Hiltzik, Los Angeles Times

The judges said his columns were "smart, angry and sometimes laugh-out-loud funny, tackling complex subjects in a lively, accessible style with a strong voice and a real sense of being on the reader's side.

Columns:
1. "Tobacco Fires Back as Ads Become Sorely Personal", April 17, 2003
2. "SBC, It's All in the Way You Look at It", June 23, 2003
3. "Stock Picker, 20, a Genius? Perhaps in His Own Eyes", August 21, 2003
4. "Safeway's Merger Loss Eclipses Labor Woes", October 23, 2003
5. "City Putting a Pound in the Way of Progress", December 1, 2003
6. "Lockyer Not Above a Little Legal Aid", December 18, 2003

- 2005: "Cracks in Fannie Mae's Foundation" by Peter Eavis, TheStreet.com

Columns:
1. "Fannie's Fearsome New Year Challenge", January 2, 2004
2. "Freddie Flap Highlights Fannie Flaw", January 30, 2004
3. "A New Reason to Fret About Fannie", April 1, 2004
4. "Fannie Flap Points to Options Grants", April 6, 2004
5. "Falcon Has Landed at Fannie Mae" May 6, 2004
6. "Fannie Probe Turns to Derivatives", September 2, 2004
7. "Fannie Fight Ready to Get Nastier", November 11, 2004

- 2006 (tie): "Review and Outlook: Kianna's Law" by Robert L. Pollock, The Wall Street Journal

Columns:
1. "How About a Kianna's Law?", 2005
2. "Kianna's Legacy", 2005
3. "The FDA vs. Cancer Patients", 2005
4. Pazdur's Cancer Rules", 2005

- 2006 (tie): "Business and Economics Columns" by Steven Pearlstein, The Washington Post

Columns:
1. "Big Three Lumbering Toward Failure", March 25, 2005
2. "Greenspan Misfires on Fannie, Freddie", May 25, 2005
3. "Defection Could Be Just What Organizaed Labor Needs", July 20, 2005
4. "Refiners' Merger Good for Business, Not Consumers", September 7, 2005
5. "Boats Rose in New Orleans, but Not for the Poor", September 14, 2005
6. "Alaska Would Be More at Home in Russia", November 23, 2005
7. "When Breaking Up is Not Hard to Do", December 14, 2005

- 2007: "Steve Bailey Downtown" by Steve Bailey, The Boston Globe

Columns:
1. "Key West Academy", February 1, 2006
2. "Bluto does good", March 10, 2006
3. "Gov. Jobs is MIA", April 5, 2006
4. "Good job, lost wages", May 10, 2006
5. "Friendly Fenway", July 26, 2006
6. "An American dream denied", October 18, 2006
7. "Happy 50th, Marty", November 29, 2006

- 2008: "Talking Business" by Joe Nocera, Vanity Fair

Columns:
1. "A Double Shot Of Nostalgia For Starbucks", March 3, 2007
2. "Well-Meaning But Misguided Stock Screens", April 7, 2007
3. "Weighing Jobs's Role In a Scandal", April 28, 2007
4. "IPhone Spin Goes Round And Round", June 30, 2007
5. "How The Bancrofts Blew It", August 4, 2007
6. "What If C.E.O. Pay Is Fair?", October 13, 2007
7. "The Pursuit Of Justice, Or Money?", December 8, 2007

- 2008: (Honorable Mention) "Business Columnist" by Daniel Howes of The Detroit News

Columns
1. "Real answers for Big 3 sting", January 31, 2007
2. "Who will save state when even boosters bail?", March 7, 2007
3. "A tough blow, a long road ahead", June 23, 2007
4. "A state in a state of denial", September 21, 2007
5. "Tactics from 1970 don't fit '07 reality", September 25, 2007

- 2009: "Fannie Mae and Freddie Mac" by Brian M. Carney, The Wall Street Journal

Articles in Series:
1. "Fannie Mae Alchemy", 2008
2. "A More Honest Socialism", 2008
3. "The Price of Fannie Mae", 2008
4. "Paulson's Fannie Test", 2008
5. "Whitewashing Fannie Mae", 2008

- 2010: "Capitalist Fools and Wall Street's Toxic Message" by Joseph E. Stiglitz, Vanity Fair

Articles in Series:
1. "Capitalist Fools", January 2009
2. "Wall Street's Toxic Message", July 2009

- 2011: "Paul Krugman Columns" by Paul Krugman, The New York Times

Columns:
1. "Fiscal Scare Tactics", February 5, 2010
2. "Now That's Rich", August 23, 2010
3. "Downhill With The G.O.P.", September 24, 2010
4. "The Hijacked Commission", November 12, 2010
5. "The Humbug Express", December 24, 2010

- 2012: "Euro Zone" by Zanny Minton Beddoes, Edward Carr, John Peet, Patrick Foulis and John O'Sullivan, The Economist

Columns:
1. "Time for Plan B", January 15, 2011
2. "They're bust. Admit it.", April 2, 2011
3. "How to save the euro", September 17, 2011
4. "Europe's rescue plan", October 29, 2011
5. "Is this really the end?", November 26, 2011

- 2013: "John Gapper (Financial Times)" by John Gapper, Financial Times

Articles in Series:
1. "Facebook ought to ditch its initial public offering", 2012
2. "Law firms have struck the limits of partnership", 2012
3. "JPMorgan's fiasco exposes the myth of an imperial CEO", 2012
4. "It is too late for America to eliminate Huawei", 2012
5. "HP should have known all about Autonomy", November 21, 2012

- 2014: "Commentary by Peter Goodman" by Peter Goodman, The Huffington Post
- 2015: "Wall Street Accountability" by Jesse Eisinger, ProPublica
- 2016: "Inside the Boardroom" by James B. Stewart, The New York Times
- 2017: "Creative Destruction: The Schumpeter Column" by Adrian Wooldridge, The Economist

Columns:
1. "The collaboration curse: The fashion for making employees collaborate has gone too far", January 23, 2016
2. "Mafia management: The crime families of Naples are remarkably good at business", August 27, 2016
3. "Shhhh! Companies would benefit from helping introverts to thrive", September 10, 2016
4. "Out with the old. Management theory is becoming a compendium of dead ideas", December 17, 2016
5. "Capitalism and democracy: The West confronts a future of slow growth, social division and populist revolt", December 24, 2016

- 2018: "The Pharmalot View" by Ed Silverman, Stat
- 2019: "Inside View" by Andy Kessler, The Wall Street Journal

Columns:

1. "Elon Musk's Uncontested 3-Pointers", February 26, 2018
2. "A Better Way to Make Facebook Pay", April 9, 2018
3. "Advice to New Grads: Scale or Bail", May 21, 2018
4. "General Electric's Long Unwinding", June 25, 2018
5. "Anything Good Takes Exactly Five Meetings", November 19, 2018

- 2020 (tie): "America’s Broken Health Care System" by Elisabeth Rosenthal, Kaiser Health News
- 2020 (tie): "A Secret Life of Your Data" by Geoffrey A. Fowler, The Washington Post
- 2021: "Sincerely, Michelle" by Michelle Singletary, The Washington Post

Columns in Series:
1. "Yes, I was hired because I was Black. But that’s not the only reason.", September 18, 2020
2. "Stop telling Black people we could close the wealth gap if we valued education more", September 25, 2020
3. "The legacy of slavery made my grandmother fear investing", October 9, 2020
4. "Credit scores are supposed to be race-neutral. That’s impossible.", October 16, 2020
5. "Being Black lowers the value of my home: The legacy of redlining", October 23, 2020
6. "Yes, Black Americans are entitled to reparations. We’ve earned them.", October 30, 2020
7. "Systemic racism, not $200 Air Jordans, suppresses Black wealth", November 6, 2020
8. "Black businesses are fighting for their lives. We can’t afford to lose them.", November 20, 2020
9. "Racial microaggressions take a major toll on Black Americans", December 4, 2020
10. "Black Americans donate a higher share of their wealth than Whites", December 11, 2020

- 2022: "Auto Insurance Columns" by Chad Livengood, Crain's Detroit Business
- 2023: "Coverage of the Infant Formula Shortage" by Alyssa Rosenberg, The Washington Post

Columns in series:
1. "The ongoing baby formula shortage is a reminder of a disturbing truth in America", September 21, 2022
2. "The baby formula crisis wasn’t a complete disaster. Here’s why.", September 26, 2022
3. "The U.S. should never have another baby formula shortage", October 6, 2022
