= List of winners of the Gerald Loeb Award for Small and Medium Newspapers =

The Gerald Loeb Award for Small and Medium Newspapers was a business news reporting award conferred in 2013 and 2014, although similar awards have existed under other titles since 1974. The "Newspaper" category was awarded in 1958–1973. It was split into two categories beginning in 1974: "Small Newspapers" and "Large Newspapers". A third category, "Medium Newspapers," was created in 1987. The small and medium newspaper awards were combined as "Medium & Small Newspapers" in 2009–2012, and "Small & Medium Newspapers" in 2013–2014. The last year newspaper categories were awarded was 2014. "Small & Medium Newspapers" was replaced by the platform-neutral category "Local" in 2015.

== Gerald Loeb Award for Small Newspapers (1974–1983, 1985–2008) ==
- 1974: Livingston V. Taylor, The Courier-Journal

Article:

"Kentucky Banks Continue Using State Funds at 4%", October 15, 1973

- 1975: "Who Owns West Virginia?" by Tom Miller, The Herald-Advertiser
- 1976: "The Multinational Corporations" by David R. Francis, The Christian Science Monitor

"The Multinational Corporations" was a four-part series examining the power of major companies and an analysis of their impact on the third world.

- 1977: "The Alaska Pipeline" by Sally Jones and Rosemary Shinohara, The Anchorage Daily News

The team investigated the problems building and financing the Alaska oil pipeline.

- 1977: "The Greenback Islands: A Look at Off-Shore Tax Havens" by Larry Kramer, The San Francisco Examiner

Kramer reported on offshore tax havens.

- 1978: Harold Chucker, Minneapolis Star

Articles in Series:
1. "New-business capital harder to secure", July 11, 1977
2. "Rules restrict investment", July 12, 1977
3. "Few firms are finding financing easily", July 13, 1977
4. "Venture-capital firms back few seekers", July 14, 1977
5. "Purse strings tighten up", July 15, 1977

- 1979: "Facing Up to Inflation" by Philip Moeller, The Courier-Journal

Articles in Series:
1. "The inflation battle: We can't win for losing", July 30, 1978
2. "How inflation game is played", July 30, 1978
3. "Inflation will be with us for years", July 31, 1978
4. "Recession's assured — is your job?", August 1, 1978
5. "On home front, inflation fight begins at budget", August 2, 1978
6. "Battling budget bulge can flatter your figures", August 3, 1978
7. "The Inflation Menace v. Average Joe: It's a three-round fight to the finish", August 4, 1978
8. "Poor Richard was wrong: A penny spent may save", August 5, 1978
9. "For investors, inflation is capital punishment", August 6, 1978
10. "Uncle Sam may not have your best interest at heart", August 6, 1978
11. "A home: Shelter from the inflation storm", August 7, 1978
12. "Techniques for big-money investing in real estate can return big money", August 7, 1978
13. "Don't buy a Retirement Lie", August 8, 1978
14. "Old belt-tightening ways may not trim today's inflation", August 9, 1978
15. "Cost of inflation can't b calculated in dollars alone", August 10, 1978

- 1980: "Rent Control" by Joe R. Cordero and Tim W. Ferguson, Santa Ana Register
- 1981: "The Chrysler Saga" by Gary M. Hector, American Banker
- 1982: Phil Norman, Louisville Courier-Journal

Articles in Series:
1. "Sacred Cows: Power, Politics and Prices in the Milk Industry", April 12, 1981
2. "How milk is priced", April 12, 1981
3. "Confusing maneuvers lurk under price tag", April 12, 1981
4. "Dairymen's bold course is financed by farmers", April 13, 1981
5. "Attorney is called the brains behind the co-op", April 13, 1981
6. "Fast-growing national firm fights co-op's legal battles", April 13, 1981
7. "Firm's critics even offer much praise for manager", April 13, 1981
8. "Small farmer leads co-op in crusade on 'parasites'", April 13, 1981
9. "Fast growth of co-ops brings fears of monopoly", April 14, 1981
10. "Farmers see dairy co-op as a blessing and a curse", April 15, 1981
11. "Milk system is costing the public in prices and taxes", April 16, 1981
12. "Dairy lobby lost battle, but the war is going on", April 16, 1981

- 1982: (Honorable Mention) "The Federal Impact Series" by the Staff of the Sentinel Star (including Susan Taylor Martin, Larry Lipman, John C. Van Gieson, Wendy Spirduso, Thomas Sabulis, Jim Nesbitt, Sharon Carrasco, Scott Abrahams, Jim Clark, Charlie Jean, Alex Beasley, Robert Johnson Anne Groer, Keay Davidson, Noel Holston, Dean Johnson, Jim Runnels)

Articles in Series:
1. "In Orange County, Uncle Sam outspends them all", April 19, 1981
2. "Programs come and go, are swallowed and grow", April 19, 1981
3. "Grant writers: There's gold in them thar pens", April 19, 1981
4. "Orlando buys basics with handout aid", April 20, 1981
5. "Eatonville building future with government grants", April 20, 1981
6. "Construction firms built with low bids", April 20, 1981
7. "Community Coordinated Child Care", April 20, 1981
8. "Disney World doesn't make believe over funding", April 20, 1981
9. "Bidding rules bypassed on furniture buy", April 20, 1981
10. "Right numbers can add up to extra money", April 20, 1981
11. "Budget growth an economic Frankenstein", April 20, 1981
12. "Schools learn vital lesson in funding", April 21, 1981
13. "Aid to Orange County schools", April 21, 1981
14. "U.S. millions come rigged with strings", April 22, 1981
15. "If handouts dried up, tide of taxes would rise", April 22, 1981
16. "Training for 12 mechanics a costly lesson", April 22, 1981
17. "Does government encourage suits against county?", April 22, 1981
18. "Double reimbursement for trip prompts closer scrutiny of bills", April 22, 1981
19. "Friendly sky may lose its smile", April 22, 1981
20. "CETA's temporary status produced long-lasting effect", April 22, 1981
21. "EPA signs the check for sewer projects", April 22, 2019
22. "Tax dollars keep hotels loaded with conventioneers", April 22, 1981
23. "Military owns big guns of U.S. Funding", April 23, 1981
24. "VA money: a balm for battle scars", April 23, 1981
25. "Defense Contracts", April 23, 1981
26. "Military's tab a big receipt for economy", April 23, 1981
27. "Social Security setup helps 1 in 3", April 24, 1981
28. "Budget, benefits balloon with Social Security", April 24, 2019
29. "Home-building foundation wakes shape with U.S. help", April 24, 2019
30. "2 percent of flow trickles out as welfare", April 24, 2019
31. "Agriculture money fertilizes fairways, research programs", April 24, 1981
32. "Orange County just nibbling at loans to small businesses", April 24, 1981
33. "Uncle's presence", April 24, 1981
34. "Is HUD that flush?", April 24, 1981
35. "Medicare, Medicaid funds the lifeblood of hospitals", April 25, 1981
36. "Cutbacks might pull plug on local public TV shows", April 25, 1981
37. "Cultural groups singing for dollars", April 25, 1981
38. "Health-care aid gives shot in the arm to local programs", April 25, 1981
39. "Uncle Sam chipping in to fight rising crime rate", April 25, 1981
40. "Helping to educate and protect", April 25, 1981
41. "Dollars are routed to FBI hunts, drug busts", April 25, 1981
42. "Federal blueprint for building budget", April 25, 1981

- 1983: "Series on the Failure of Penn Square Bank" by Phillip L. Zweig, American Banker
- 1984: No award given
- 1985: "The Tobacco Story" by Beth McLeo, Lawrence Spohn, Stan Swofford and Greta Tilley, Greensboro News & Record
- 1986: "The Man Who Saved Nike" by Mark L. Zusman, Willamette Week
- 1986: (Honorable Mention) Jan Brogan, Providence Journal-Bulletin
- 1987: "Floating Point's Troubled Waters" by Brent Walth, Willamette Week
- 1988: "Anatomy of a Takeover" by Paul Farhi, San Francisco Examiner
- 1988: (Honorable Mention) "The Peyton School Story: A Gamble Lost" by Julie Bird, Colorado Springs Gazette Telegraph
- 1989: "Towering Ambition" by Howard Gold, Miami Review

The series is about David Paul and Centrust Savings Bank.

- 1990: "Calculated Madness: The Rise and Fall of Crazy Eddie Antar" by Gary Belsky and Phyllis Furman, Crain's New York Business
- 1991: "A Requiem for Fashion" by Phyllis Furman and Linda Moss, Crain's New York Business

They were awarded for their writing on the effects of the AIDS epidemic on the fashion industry.

- 1992: "Shocks to the System" by Emory Thomas Jr. and M. Rex Smith, Atlanta Business Chronicle
- 1993: "Failing the Children" by Michael Hinkelman and Emory Thomas Jr., Atlanta Business Chronicle
- 1994: "UC Inc." by Lance Williams, San Francisco Examiner

He was awarded for reports on financial misconduct and improprieties by high officials at the University of California.

- 1995: "Wasteland" by Jim Lynch and Karen Dorn Steele, Spokesman-Review
- 1996: "Oil's New Frontiers" by Kim Fararo, Anchorage Daily News
- 1997: "River of No Return" by Lynda V. Mapes, The Spokesman-Review
- 1998: "Borrowing Trouble" by Amy Hetzner and Amy Baldwin, Birmingham Post-Herald

They were awarded for "an investigative series detailing the state's lending practices and how it affects the poor."

- 1999: "The Dairy Boom: Growth, Trouble and Transition" by Jennifer Hieger and Bill Heisel Jr., Yakima Herald-Republic
- 2000: Harris Meyer, New Times Broward-Palm Beach

His story examined the ethical implications of physicians using multi-level marketing arrangements to sell health-related product to their patients.

Article:

"The Doctor Will Sell You Now", July 29. 1999

- 2001: Bruce Rushton, The Riverfront Times

Article:

"Porn in the USA", November 29, 2000

- 2002: "Foal Deaths" by Janet Patton, Lexington Herald-Leader

Articles in Series:
1. "Breeders alarmed at mounting foal losses", May 8, 2001
2. "Carcasses pile up, but the killer remains elusive", May 13, 2001
3. "Veterinary, farm workers affected by high foal loss", May 20, 2001
4. "The caterpillar keeps crawling back into the equation", May 22, 2001
5. "The answer was chewing on the leaves", May 27, 2001
6. "Foal death mystery remains, even as UK set to advise farms", September 30, 2001
7. "Foal loss exceeds 5,100, study says", October 16, 2001

- 2003: "A License to Steal" by Eric Eyre and Scott Finn, The Charleston Gazette

Their series exposed secret deals among a "good ol' boy" network that increased prices. Their stories kept pressure on authorities and led to the cancellation of at least one deal as well as the resignation of a federal prosecutor and a state official.

Articles in Series:
1. "'A license to steal'", November 3, 2002
2. "School official resigns", November 2, 2002
3. "School officials subject to probe", November 1, 2002
4. "State equipment maintenance contract under review", November 15, 2002
5. "Flooded coffers", November 17, 2002
6. "Investigated company supplied Ground Zero rescuers", November 18, 2002
7. "State drops equipment repair deal", November 22, 2002
8. "School official was pressured for flood funds", December 1, 2002
9. "Flood insurance deal scuttled", December 8, 2002
10. "Following the floodwaters", December 8, 2002
11. "The go-to-guys", December 22, 2002

- 2004: "Everybody at Risk" by Kate Long, The Charleston Gazette

Articles in Series:
1. "On The Edge", June 15, 2003
2. "We Sink Or Swim With Everyone Else", June 17, 2003
3. "Insurance: With & Without", August 3, 2003
4. "Cancel The Discount?", August 3, 2003
5. "Hospital Sticker Shock", August 3, 2003
6. "We Thought We Had Insurance", December 21, 2003

- 2005: "The China Challenge" by Craig Troianello, Yakima Herald-Republic

Articles in Series:
1. "Apples to Apples", December 5, 2004
2. "Apples feed economy", December 6, 2004
3. "Peering into the future", December 7, 2004
4. "Meeting and competing", December 8, 2014

- 2006: "School's Pursuit of Profit Leaves Students Behind" by Sam Kennedy and Christina Gostomski, The Morning Call

Their story uses a local perspective to reveal the long-term effects of unscrupulous marketing, educational financing, and recruitment practices on unsophisticated students by for-profit educational enterprises.

Articles in Series:
1. "School's Pursuit of Profit Leaves Students Behind", April 24, 2005
2. "School Steers Students to Backbreaking Loans", May 22, 2005
3. "Dally Wants Hearing on School Loans", September 25, 2005
4. "Spotlight to be on Lehigh Valley College Loans", October 16, 2005
5. "High Interest Student Loan Hearing Moves to Capital", November 4, 2005
6. "Lawmakers Turn Up Heat On LVC Loans", November 10, 2005
7. “School Pulls Plug On Pricey Loan Program", February 23, 2006

- 2007: "The Great Empire Zone Giveaway" by Mike McAndrew and Michelle Breidenbach, The Post-Standard

Articles in Series:
1. "Money for Nothing", September 17, 2006
2. "The tax-credit generators", September 17, 2006
3. "Pataki's plan short-circuited in Legislature", September 17, 2006
4. "No Small Change", September 24, 2006
5. "State inflates 'new job' counts", September 24, 2006
6. "Old Sabres, new money", September 24, 2006
7. "Without Promised Expansions, Pyramid Collects Millions", October 1, 2006
8. "Hou You Can Cut Your Utility Bill", October 8, 2006
9. "For top 10 firms, $56M in refunds for few jobs", October 8, 2006
10. "What Happens When Tax Breaks Are For Sale", November 19, 2006

- 2008: "The China Effect" by Tony Bartelme, The Post and Courier

Articles in Series:
1. "Stem Cells: Miracle or mirage?", May 26, 2007
2. "The road to China", May 27, 2007
3. "Reality check", May 28, 2007
4. "China's rise has cost South Carolina jobs but it's also saving consumers money", April 29, 2007
5. "China's industry of knockoff Picassos, iPods, Viagra and more affects business worldwide", April 30, 2007
6. "Great pall of China: Smog dirties world's air", May 1, 2007
7. "The big squeeze", May 5, 2007
8. "Security at port is a quick scan away"May 6, 2007
9. "Charleston uses several security levels", May 6, 2007
10. "Hong Kong's t'ai chi", May 14, 2007

== Gerald Loeb Award for Medium Newspapers (1987–2008) ==
- 1987: "Technical Equities" by Edward O. Welles, San Jose Mercury News West Magazine
- 1988: "Down and Out in the Middle Class" by David Sylvester, San Jose Mercury News
- 1989: "Invisible Work Force" by S. Lynne Walker, The San Diego Union

The story is about illegal immigrant farm workers in San Diego County, California.

- 1990: "Coverage of the Collapse of Charles H. Keating Jr.'s Lincoln Savings & Loan" by Jerry Kammer, Andy Hall and Team, The Arizona Republic
- 1991: "Frank's Town" by Bill Dalton, Mike Hendricks and Chris Lester, The Kansas City Star

They were awarded for "a profile of Kansas City financier Frank Morgan."

- 1992: "Adios Wisconsin: The Mexican Job Connection" by John Fauber and Jack Norman, The Milwaukee Journal
- 1993: "Profits and Power: Japan's Foreign-Aid Machine" by Pete Carey and Lewis M. Simons, San Jose Mercury News
- 1994: "The HMO Maze: How Medicare Fails Seniors" by Fred Schulte and Larry Keller, Sun-Sentinel

Articles in series:
1. "Elderly find HMOs can be a gamble", November 7, 1993
2. "Seniors divided over HMOs", November 7, 1993
3. "Grievance reports detail variety of woes", November 7, 1993
4. "Records outline status of South Florida HMOs", November 7, 1993
5. "Treatment Trouble", November 7, 1993
6. "Abuses plague HMOs", November 8, 1993
7. "Cost-reduction incentives under fire", November 8, 1993
8. "Warning to travelers: Better not get sick out there", November 8, 1993
9. "Power of Profits", November 8, 1993
10. "Monitoring of agents lax at times", November 8, 1993
11. "Staff turnover may hurt quality of care", November 9, 1993
12. "Medicare tab to climb 12.3%", November 9, 1993
13. "Plan's controls help raise quality, physician says ", November 9, 1993
14. "Bad to worse", November 9, 1993
15. "Patient says HMO doctor was abusive", November 9, 1993
16. "Grievance system criticized", November 10, 1993
17. "Medicare officials pledge to look into readers' complaints", November 10, 1993
18. "Long, hard road", November 10, 1993
19. "Reports on care not available to consumers", November 10, 1993
20. "Officials struggle with HMO regulation", November 11, 1993
21. "State officials promise action", November 11, 1993
22. "Tactics under fire", November 11, 1993
23. "HMO stays alive despite woes", November 11, 1993
24. "Through the cracks", November 11, 1993

- 1995: "Stacking the Deck: The Birth of Louisiana Gambling" by Peter Nicholas, Susan Finch, Mark Schleifstein, Mike Hughlett and James O'Byrne, Times-Picayune
- 1996: "Formula for Disaster: The Lodi Explosion" by Debra Lynn Vial, Michael Moore and Bruce Locklin, The Record

Articles in Series:
1. "Chain of errors left 5 dead", October 17, 1995
2. "Credentials of 'expert' misrepresented", October 17, 1995
3. "Lodi skirted safety laws", October 18, 1995
4. "Chemical Companies in Lodi", October 18, 1995
5. "Accident reveals weaknesses in oversight at many levels", October 19, 1995
6. "U.S. may add criminal charges", October 19, 1995
7. "OSHA's Findings", October 19, 1995

- 1997: "Series of Investigative Reports on Comparator Systems Corp." by Cathy Taylor, Liz Pulliam and Elliot Blair Smith, Orange County Register
- 1998: "House of Cards" by William Conroy, Nancy Shields, John T. Ward, Larry Arnold, Rick Linsk and Terri Somers, Asbury Park Press

They were awarded for seven stories from a year-long investigation and series of reports on a multimillion-dollar real estate fraud scheme in New Jersey and three other states. Their series led to state and federal investigations.

- 1999: "Cosmetic Surgery: The Hidden Dangers" by Fred Schulte and Jenni Bergal, Sun-Sentinel

Their series and subsequent articles on cosmetic surgery deaths led the Florida Board of Medicine to tighten safety standards for office surgery.

Articles in Series:
1. "Plastic surgery: The risks you take", November 29, 1998
2. "Lack of regulations heightens surgical risks", November 30, 1998
3. "Training for laser surgery can be lax", November 30, 1998
4. "Patient briefing often sketchy", November 30, 1998
5. "Marketing blitz entices patients", December 1, 1998
6. "In the business of marketing body makeovers", December 1, 1998
7. "A cash cow or a lousy business", December 1, 1998
8. "Patients can nip and tuck now, pay later", December 1, 1998
9. "Clamping down on plastic surgeons", December 2, 1998
10. "Board moves to toughen plastic surgery rules", December 4, 1998
11. "Top doctor: Adopt surgery rules", December 5, 1998
12. "Plastic Surgeon to return to work", December 7, 1998
13. "Protecting plastic surgery patients", December 12, 1998

- 2000: "A Killer in Our Food" by Alison Young, Jeffrey Taylor and Janet L. Fix, Detroit Free Press

Their series examined a nationwide lysteria outbreak and the subsequent recall and epidemiological investigation.

Articles in series:
1. "Scraps below, drips above: A some home for bacteria", August 23, 1999
2. "The hunt begins", August 24, 1999
3. "Crisis at Sara Lee", August 25, 1999
4. "Crisis fades, pain endures", August 26, 1999
5. "It can happen again", August 27, 1999

- 2001: "Government Inc." by Robert Sargent, Ramsey Campbell, Jim Leusner and Sean Holton, The Orlando Sentinel

Their series "examined how Florida law allowed private developers to profit at the expense of homeowners."

Articles in Series:
1. "It takes a village to raise a fortune", October 15, 2000
2. "Top dollar for plain old stuff", October 15, 2000
3. "Playing by their own rules", October 15, 2000
4. "Players in the shadows, people in the dark", October 16, 2000
5. "Pockets of rebellion emerge here, there", October 16, 2000
6. "5 residents who refused to buckle under", October 16, 2000
7. "Country lawyer helps build a new city", October 17, 2000
8. "Lake official found a future at The Villages", October 17, 2000
9. "Falcon Trace quietly found home", October 17, 2000
10. "Islands of luxury", October 18, 2000
11. "Challenge holds up Osceola Trace", October 18, 2000

- 2002: "Unequal Opportunity" by Jeffrey Meitrodt, Mark Schleifstein, Pamela Coyle and Ronette King, The Times-Picayune

Articles in Series:
1. "Pushed Aside", March 25, 2001
2. "Exploiting Opportunity", March 25, 2001
3. "Insecure Future", March 25, 2001
4. "Breaking Barriers", March 26, 2001
5. "Through the Cracks", March 27, 2001
6. "Ready-Mix DBE", March 27, 2001
7. "Numbers Game", March 27, 2001

- 2003: "The CEO and His Church" by Deborah O'Neil and Jeff Harrington, St. Petersburg Times

Their investigation exposed the secret influential ties between a church and a public company.

Articles in Series:
1. "The CEO and His Church", June 2, 2002
2. "Separating belief and business", June 2, 2002

- 2004: "Drugging the Poor" by Fred Schulte, South Florida Sun-Sentinel
- 2005: "Danger Overhead: Crushed Roofs" by Bill Vlasic and Jeff Plungis, The Detroit News

Articles in Series:
1. "Thousands killed, hurt as auto roofs collapse", April 11, 2004
2. "Seat belts not enough to save lives in rollovers", April 12, 2004
3. "Feds, Big Three gird for roof showdown", April 13, 2004

- 2006: "Ohio Rare Coin Funds" by Christopher Kirkpatrick, Joshua Boak, Steve Eder, Jim Drew and Mike Wilkinson, The Blade

Their series exposed major investment abuses by the Ohio workers' compensation board.

Articles in Series:
1. "Ohio agency sinks millions into rare coins", April 3, 2005
2. "Investors suffer when coin funds lose their luster; string of scandals tarnishes market", April 24, 2005
3. "Coin fund profits for state hinged on graders' opinions", May 30, 2005
4. "Documents show how BWC pumped cash into failing fund", June 17, 2005
5. "Coin trades offered huge upside for dealers", August 8, 2005
6. "BWC fires all its money managers", 2005
7. "Firm backed by rare-coin money supplied international stamp deal", 2005

- 2006: (Honorable Mention) "Selling Drug Secrets" by Luke Timmerman and David Heath, The Seattle Times

Their highly detailed report exposed the practice of doctors being paid by financial firms for details about pending drug trials.

Articles in Series:
1. "Drug researchers leak secretsto Wall St.", August 7, 2005
2. "Investors quiz researcher in recorded conference call", August 7, 2005
3. "Selling secrets can distort data, kill promising drugs", August 7, 2005
4. "Some doctors see ethical pitfall in actions that others defend", August 7, 2005
5. "Sellers, buyers of secrets risk being prosecuted", August 7, 2005

- 2007: "Crab Factory" by Chiaki Kawajiri, Gady A. Epstein, and Stephanie Desmon, The Baltimore Sun

Articles in Series:
1. "Crab Factory", April 30, 2006
2. "Helping Nature", April 30, 2006
3. "Working The Water", May 1, 2006
4. "'Made in USA'", May 1, 2006

- 2008: "Sold a Nightmare" by Binyamin Appelbaum, Lisa Hammersly Munn, Ted Mellnik, Peter St. Onge and Liz Chandler, The Charlotte Observer

Articles in Series:
1. "Sold a nightmare", March 18, 2007
2. "One home save by a 2nd income", March 18, 2007
3. "Data wrong on some applications", March 18, 2007
4. "Beazer says it followed the law", March 18, 2007
5. "'$1 down' was an ominous sign", March 18, 2007
6. "House had code violations", March 18, 2007
7. "Homes with Beazer loans cost more", March 18, 2007
8. "Starter homes, sad endings", March 19, 2007
9. "How to buy your 1st home", March 19, 2007
10. "1 builder, hundreds of foreclosures", March 20, 2007
11. "Failed mortgages fly under the radar", March 21, 2007
12. "'No closing costs' add up fast", July 8, 2007
13. "Promises upfront, deals on the side", September 30, 2007
14. "Buyer blames himself – and agent", September 30, 2007
15. "Home loans were ill-fated", September 30, 2007
16. "New suburbs in fast decay", December 9, 2007
17. "The anatomy of a foreclosure crisis", December 9, 2007

== Gerald Loeb Award for Medium & Small Newspapers (2009–2012) ==
- 2009: "Borrowers Betrayed" by Jack Dolan, Matthew Haggman and Rob Barry, The Miami Herald
- 2009: (Honorable Mention) "The Cruelest Cuts" by Ames Alexander, Peter St. Onge, Franco Ordoñez, Kerry Hall and Ted Mellnik, The Charlotte Observer

Articles in Series:
1. "House of Raeford Farms masks injuries inside Carolinas plants", February 10, 2008
2. "An epidemic of pain", February 10, 2008
3. "Poultry series exposes a new, silent subclass", February 10, 2008
4. "Fight and might", February 11, 2008
5. "Company Safety is our priority", February 11, 2008
6. "Some managers knew workers were illegal, former employees say", February 12, 2008
7. "A boss's view: Keep them working", February 12, 2008
8. "Workers say they're denied proper medical care", February 13, 2008
9. "Judge criticized Tyson guidelines", February 13, 2008
10. "A worker's grueling day", February 13, 2008
11. "Injured workers say they aren't given time off to heal", February 14, 2008
12. "Workplace inspections at 15-year low", February 15, 2008
13. "Regulators reduce company's fines", February 15, 2008
14. "Penalties reduced in violations involving dangerous chemicals", February 15, 2008
15. "Company avoids harshest sanction after fatal accident", February 15, 2008
16. "Inspectors knew of repetitive work pain in 1994", February 15, 2008
17. "House of Raeford: We're working to prevent injuries", February 15, 2008
18. "N.C. backs off poultry scrutiny", February 15, 2008
19. "Hearings planned on poultry workers", February 17, 2008
20. "Easley to seek poultry changes", 2008
21. "Berry plans no changes after stories on poultry", March 9, 2008
22. "Lawmakers: Toughen poultry plant penalties", April 2, 2008
23. "Doctors feel push to downplay injuries", April 19, 2008
24. "Senators want OSHA's injury reports probed", 2008
25. "Family devastated, plant fined $2,500", April 26, 2008
26. "Measure would aid poultry workers", 2008

- 2010: "Keys to the Kingdom: How State Regulators Enabled a $7 Billion Ponzi Scheme" by Michael Sallah, Rob Barry and Lucy Komisar, The Miami Herald

Articles in Series:
1. "State aided suspect in huge swindle", July 5, 2009
2. "Stanford case puts lawyers in spotlight", October 4, 2009
3. "Feds eye Stanford's many ties to Congress", December 27, 2009

- 2011: "Hounded - Debtors and the New Breed of Collectors" by Chris Serres and Glenn Howatt, Minneapolis Star Tribune

Articles in Series:
1. "In jail [for being] in debt", June 6, 2010
2. "Is jailing debtors the same as debtors jail?", June 6, 2010
3. "What to know: Avoiding warrants". June 6, 2010
4. "Justice denied as debt seizures soar", August 29, 2010
5. "How garnishment works in Minnesota", August 29, 2010
6. "Criminals land jobs as debt collectors", December 12, 2010
7. "Would you give them your credit card number?", December 12, 2010

- 2011: "Seniors for Sale" Michael J. Berens The Seattle Times

Articles in Series:
1. "Seniors for sale", January 31, 2010
2. "State-required training for prospective owners has serious flaws", January 31, 2010
3. "Deaths in adult homes hidden and ignored", September 12, 2010
4. "How to recognize and prevent pressure sores", September 12, 2010
5. "Bed brokers scramble to cash in", December 12, 2010

- 2012: "Shattered Trust" by Raquel Rutledge, Rick Barrett, John Diedrich, Ben Poston and Mike de Sisti of Milwaukee Journal Sentinel

Articles in Series
1. "Shattered Trust", June 26, 2011
2. "A look at the Triad case", June 26, 2011
3. "Video", June 26, 2011
4. "Are recalled wipes still in use?", July 17, 2011
5. "Pads used despite bacterium", September 22, 2011
6. "FDA falling short on safety checks", December 28, 2011
7. "Priorities, staffing impede oversight", December 28, 2011

- 2012: "Inside Amazon's Warehouse" by Spencer Soper and Scott Kraus, The Morning Call

Articles in Series:
1. "Inside Amazon's Warehouse", September 18, 2011
2. "Amazon gets heat over warehouse", September 25, 2011
3. "Amazon workers left out in the cold", November 6, 2011

== Gerald Loeb Award for Small & Medium Newspapers (2013–2014) ==
- 2013: "Prognosis: Profits" Ames Alexander, Karen Garloch, Joseph Neff and David Raynor, The Charlotte Observer and The News & Observer

Articles in Series:
1. "Nonprofit hospitals thrive on profits", April 22, 2012
2. "Most N.C. horpitals slim on charity care", April 23, 2012
3. "Who pays for the patients?", April 23, 2012
4. "Carolinas HealthCare System statement", April 23, 2012
5. "Hospital suits force new pain on patients", April 24, 2012
6. "Hospital's clout in capital built with money, contacts", April 25, 2012
7. "Prices soar as hospitals dominate cancer market", September 23, 2012
8. "Same drug, different prices", September 23, 2012
9. "How we reported the story", September 23, 2012

- 2013: "Ghost Workers", Mandy Locke and David Raynor, The News & Observer

Articles in Series:
1. "Employees pay the price of workers' comp neglect", April 1, 2012
2. "What is worker's comp?", April 1, 2012
3. "Cheating employers make it tough to compete", August 19, 2012
4. "Struggling to stay in U.S., he feels invisible", August 19, 2012
5. "Employee vs. contractor", August 19, 2012
6. "Injured worker pays for employer's gamble", August 20, 2012
7. "What's the difference", August 20, 2012
8. "The skinny on worker's comp", August 20, 2012
9. "Inept bureaucracy lets unlawful businesses win", August 22, 2012

- 2014: "Deadly Delays" by Ellen Gabler, Mark Johnson, John Fauber, Allan James Vestal, and Kristyna Wentz-Graff, Milwaukee Journal Sentinel

== See also ==
- Gerald Loeb Award winners for Large Newspapers
- Gerald Loeb Award winners for Newspaper
