= Robert Nichols =

Robert Nichols may refer to:

== Entertainment ==
- Robert Nichols (poet) (1893–1944), English writer and poet
- Robert Nichols (author) (1919–2010), American poet, playwright, novelist, and landscape architect
- Robert Nichols (actor) (1924–2013), American actor

== Sports ==
- Robbie Nichols (1946–2011), American football linebacker
- Robbie Nichols (ice hockey) (born 1964), Canadian ice hockey player and coach
- Bob Nichols (basketball) (1930–2013), American basketball coach
- Bob Nichols (American football) (born 1943), American football player
- Bob Nichols (curler), American curler
- Bobby Nichols (born 1936), American golfer

== Other ==
- Robert Nichols (politician) (born 1944), American politician and Texas State Senator, 2007–present
- Rob Nichols (born 1969), American trade association executive and former Assistant Secretary of the Treasury for Public Affairs
- Robert Nichols (identity thief) (1926–2002), American identity thief and formerly unidentified person
- Robert C. Nichols (born 1927), American psychologist
- Robert E. Nichols (1925–1996), American business journalist, president of SABEW
- Robert L. Nichols (1922–2001), United States Marine Corps general

== See also ==
- Rob Nicol, New Zealand cricketer
- Robert Nichol (disambiguation)
- Robert Nicholls (disambiguation)
- Robert Carter Nicholas (disambiguation)
