= Ben Schifman =

American journalist

- Born: April 20, 1913; Kansas City, Missouri, US
- Died: September 22, 1998 (aged 85); Kansas City, Missouri, US
- Occupation: journalist
- Years active: 1930–1982
- Employer: The Kansas City Star
- Organization: SABEW
- Spouse: Mary Lapin
- Children: 3

Ben B. Schifman (April 20, 1913 – September 22, 1998) was a business journalist for The Kansas City Star who won a Gerald Loeb Award and served as the treasurer and president of the Society of American Business Editors and Writers (SABEW).

== Early life ==
Schifman was born on April 20, 1913, in Kansas City, Missouri, to Celia and Aron Schifman. Celia was born in Zawichost, Poland. Celia and Aron, who was also born in Poland, both emigrated to the United States in 1906 and settled in Kansas City. Schifman had a sister named Rose and four brothers – David, Herman, Maurice, and Meyer.

Schifman grew up in Kansas City, where he attended Humboldt School. He attended Manual Training High School, where he appeared in a production of the operetta Sunbonnet Sue in 1929. He dropped out of school before graduation to help support his family when the Great Depression hit. He later took night classes at Kansas City Junior College and a two-year course given by the American Institute of Banking.

== Career ==
=== United Press ===
Schifman started his career in 1930 working for the United Press. He became a financial writer and helped establish the St. Louis financial relay for the company.

=== The Kansas City Star ===
In 1934, Schifman began working for The Kansas City Star as a temp reporting on livestock, produce, and grain. He became a staff reporter later in the year. In 1936, he became a financial writer while doubling as a court reporter. That same year, he started the first local daily financial column in Kansas City entitled "On The Financial Front." He became the financial editor in 1954 after being mentored for the position. He received a Gerald Loeb special achievement award for a series of articles in 1961 on the stock market and related investment problems in which he predicted the 1962 stock market crash.

Schifman became involved in the business side of the employee-owned newspaper during the 1960s. He was appointed assistant treasurer in 1962, made investment manager of the newspaper in 1963, and elected treasurer in 1966. In 1967, he was elected to the board of directors, then named financial vice president the following year. When the Star purchased Graham Paper Company in 1971, Schifman served as a vice president and board member of the new subsidiary.

In 1972, Schifman received a financial press fellowship from the Wharton School of Finance and Commerce at the University of Pennsylvania.

The Star sold itself to Capital Cities Corp. in 1977, netting Schifman approximately $2 million from the sale of his employee shares in the company. After the sale, he became a consultant to the newspaper and retired in 1982.

=== Kansas City Society of Financial Analysts ===
In 1952, Schifman helped organize the Kansas City Society of Financial Analysts. He served on the first membership committee.

=== Radio ===
Schifman hosted the business news show Financial Pages of the Air that was broadcast on WDAF Radio in 1955.

=== SABEW ===
Schifman was elected to two terms as the first treasurer of the Society of American Business Editors and Writers in 1964 and 1965. He was elected to one term as the second president of the organization in 1966. In 1967, he joined the SABEW board of governors.

=== John Hancock Awards ===
Shifman served as a judge for the 1968 John Hancock Awards for Excellence.

=== Superior Equipment Manufacturing Co. ===
In 1981, a group of Kansas City businessmen led by Schifman purchased the Superior Equipment Manufacturing Company from Tiffany Industries. Schifman became the chairman of the company. Later that year, Superior bought the Campbell Manufacturing Company of Walthill, Nebraska. Superior filed for Chapter 11 bankruptcy in 1986 and reorganized as Superior-Delta Manufacturing, Inc., the following year.

== Personal life ==
Schifman married Mary Lapin on June 6, 1937, after a four-month engagement. Mary and Schifman had three children. Stanley Lapin Schifman was born on May 5, 1939. He married Kathryn Lynn Greenwood, daughter of Paul S. Greenwood, on March 30, 1963, and they divorced in 1966. He died on May 27, 2007. Elinor Sue Schifman was born in 1940 or 1941. She married Paul Norman Gershon, son of Clarence Gershon, on August 31, 1963. William Marcus Schifman was born in 1948 or 1949.

During World War II, Schifman served in the Third Missouri Infantry.

Mary was a member of the Mizrachi Women of America and was elected to the position of third vice-president of the Kansas City chapter in 1950.

Schifman and his wife were both active with the Kehilath Israel synagogue. Mary served as president of the synagogue's women's group in 1956. Schifman was made a trustee of the congregation, served as vice president of the board, and was a director of the synagogue. He helped with the synagogue's Israel Bonds campaign, at one point serving as the campaign's chairman, and received a citation in 1962 from the national campaign headquarters.

Schifman was active with youth programs in the early 1960s. He served as a director and financial vice president of the Kansas City Junior Achievement program. He also served as an area director for the Kansas City Boy Scout council and was a member of the Tribe of Mic-O-Say.

In 1970, the Kansas City Friends of the National Jewish hospital and Research center in Denver, Colorado, honored Schifman for his leadership efforts in supporting the hospital, calling him "a truly great citizen of the community."

Mary died on October 9, 1992. Schifman died on September 22, 1998.

== Awards ==
- 1962 Gerald Loeb special achievement award for Newspapers
