= List of winners of the Gerald Loeb Newspaper Award =

The newspaper category of the Gerald Loeb Award was awarded in 1958–1973. It was split into two categories beginning in 1974: "Small Newspapers" and "Large Newspapers". A third category, "Medium Newspapers", was created in 1987. The small and medium newspaper awards were combined as "Medium & Small Newspapers" in 2009–2012, and "Small & Medium Newspapers" in 2013–2014. The last year newspaper categories were awarded was 2014.

== Gerald Loeb Award for Newspaper (1958–1973) ==
- 1958: "Corporate Management: Its Effect on the Public Security" by David Steinberg, New York Herald Tribune

He was awarded for his seven-month investigation into Swan-Finch Oil Corp. that led the Securities and Exchange Commission (SEC) to subpoena his articles and files.

- 1959: "A series of articles on the problems of recession and recovery" by Nate White, The Christian Science Monitor
- 1960: "Horizons Unlimited: Freedom's Answer" by Nate White, The Christian Science Monitor
- 1961: "New Millionaires" by James C. Tanner, Daniel M. Burnham, Edward Cony, Richard F. Janssen, William R. Clabby, David R. Jones, Richard F. Roper, Steven Swett, James MacDonald, Paul Lancaster, Roger Rowand, Robert Keatley, Donald Bacon and Mitchell Gordon, The Wall Street Journal
- 1962:
  - Robert E. Bedingfield, The New York Times

He was awarded for the excellence in business journalism expressed in his various series covering the Allegheny Corporation, the New Haven Railroad, Gerard Re & Son, and a proposed merger between American Airlines and Eastern Airlines.

Articles in Gerard Re & Son Series:
1. "Suspended Brokers Here Accused of Stock Rigging", April 28, 1961
2. "Brokers Concede A Penalty Is Due", April 29, 1961
3. "Re and Son Lose Broker's Rights", May 5, 1961

Article on American and Eastern Airlines:
- "Merger Studied By 2 Big Airlines", December 23, 1961

- Special Achievement: Ben B. Schifman, Kansas City Star, for a series on the stock market and related investment problems that predicted the 1962 stock market crash.
- Special Achievement: Christina Kirk, The New York Herald, for a three-part series on the problems confronting African-American workers.

- 1963:
  - David R. Jones, The Wall Street Journal, for reporting on the United Steel Workers' labor pact that shares cost savings achieved through automation
  - Special Achievement: "UAC: Wizard of the Sky Reaches for the Moon", by Hugh R. McEvers, Hartford Times, a series on United Aircraft's space race efforts
  - Special Achievement: Robert E. Nichols, The Los Angeles Times, for a series on Howard Hughes' business empire and his court fight with Trans World Airlines

Articles in Series:
1. "Battle of the Billionaires: Howard Hughes Plays 'David' in Fight for Control of TWA", February 18, 1962
2. "Howard Hughes Flies High in Films, Finance", February 19, 1962
3. "Hughes: From Little Bits, a Mighty Fortune", February 20, 1962
4. "Hughes: Oil and Air an Explosive Mixture", February 21, 1962
5. "Feeder Lines Vital Pawns in TWA Battle", February 22, 1962
6. "Upheaval at General Dynamics, Battle to Control TWA Linked", February 23, 1962
7. "Hughes' Future With TWA Up to Judge", February 25, 1962

- 1964:
  - "The Price of Security" by Robert E. Nichols, Los Angeles Times

Articles in Series:
1. "Space Race: Are Americans Balking at the End or Means?", July 28, 1963
2. "Immensity of Cold War Economy Forces Exercise in Definition", July 29, 1963
3. "Defense: Still Big Business but Slimmer", July 30, 1963
4. "The Issue: To Create, Produce, Reward", July 31, 1963
5. "Politics: The X Factor in Defense Industry", August 2, 1963
6. "Our Space-Age Dilemma: How Expensive is Fast?", August 4, 1963
7. "Are U.S. Taxpayers at the Boiling Point?", August 6, 1963
8. "Management Skills Held Key to Survival", August 7, 1963
9. "The 50-Way Flow: California & the '2nd Tier'", August 12, 1963
10. "No. 1 Military Contractor and How It Grew", August 13, 1963
11. "Defense Contracting: a Never-Never Land", August 14, 1963
12. "R for Rattler Hearts, D for Dragonflies", August 15, 1963
13. "The National Security Mechanism: Economic Mainspring or Shackle", August 18, 1963

- Special Achievement: "The Deficit Debate" by Lee M. Cohn, Washington Evening Star, a three-part series discussing the merits of a federal balanced budget, federal spending, and a proposed tax cut.
- Special Achievement: Gordon Chambliss, Associated Press, for a four-part series discussing business cycles, automation, and labor-management relations.

- 1965: Edwin L. Dale Jr.,The New York Times

Article:

"International Monetary System Meets a Test", November 29, 1964

- 1966: Ross M. Robertson, Louisville Courier-Journal

Article:

"Why the Gold Flows Out", February 21, 1965

- 1967: David R. Francis, The Christian Science Monitor

Series:

"Monetary Reform", September and October 1967

- 1968: Richard A. Nenneman, The Christian Science Monitor

Article:

"U.S. Balance-of-Payments Picture", May 22, 1967

- 1969: Charles N. Stabler, The Wall Street Journal

Article:

"Playing It Safe", October 9, 1968

- 1970: Leland B. DuVall, The Arkansas Gazette

Article:

"Arkansas - The Evolution of Farm Credit", July 6, 1969

- 1971: Joseph A. Livingston, The Philadelphia Evening Bulletin

Article:

"A Broker's Story: How Howard Butcher Handled Sales of Penn Central Stock", December 9, 1970

- 1972: Robert E. Bedingfield, The New York Times

Article:

"A Switching Point for Rails?", May 2, 1971

- 1973: John Barbour, Associated Press

Article:

"Rising Food Prices Traced from Farm to Market", December 1972

== See also ==
- Gerald Loeb Award winners for Large Newspapers
- Gerald Loeb Award winners for Small and Medium Newspapers
