= Gerald Loeb Award winners for Local =

American journalism award

The Gerald Loeb Award is given annually for multiple categories of business reporting. The "Local" category was awarded for business, financial, or economic stories centered in a geographic area intended for consumers in that area from a local newspaper, magazine, television station, radio station, or website. "Local" replaced "Small & Medium Newspapers" in 2015.

== Gerald Loeb Award for Local (2015–present) ==
- 2015: "Misleading March to the Top" by Mike Hendricks and Mará Rose Williams, The Kansas City Star

Article:

"UMKC’s misleading march to the top", July 26, 2014

- 2016: “Payday at the Mill,” by Whit Richardson and Steve Mistler, Portland Press Herald and Maine Sunday Telegram

Articles in Series:
1. "Payday at the mill", April 19, 2015
2. "Shrewd financiers exploit unsophisticated Maine legislators on taxpayers’ dime", April 26, 2015

- 2017: "Painkiller Profiteers" by Eric Eyre, Charleston Gazette-Mail

Articles in Series:
1. "Drug firms fueled ‘pill mills’ in rural WV", May 23, 2016
2. "Drug firms poured 780M painkillers into WV amid rise of overdoses", December 18, 2016
3. "'Suspicious' drug order rules never enforced by state", December 19, 2016

- 2018: "The Tax Divide" by Jason Grotto, Sandhya Kambhampati, and Hal Dardick, Chicago Tribune and ProPublica Illinois

Articles in Series:
1. "An unfair burden", June 10, 2017
2. "The problem with appeals", June 10, 2017
3. "Decades of errors", June 10, 2017
4. "Commercial Breakdown", December 7, 2017

- 2019: "Time Bomb" by Cary Aspinwall, Allan James Vestal and Holly K. Hacker, The Dallas Morning News

Articles in Series:
1. "Part 1: How Atmos Energy’s natural gas keeps blowing up Texas homes (while customers pay the tab)", September 23, 2018
2. "Part 2: How Texas lets Atmos Energy off the hook", September 23, 2018

- 2020: "Profiting from the Poor" by Wendi C. Thomas, Deborah Douglas, Maya Miller, Beena Raghavendran, and Doris Burke, MLK50: Justice Through Journalism and ProPublica
- 2021: "Deceit, Disrepair and Death Inside a Southern California Rental Empire" by Aaron Mendelson, Rina Palta, Chava Sanchez, Shana Daloria, and Priska Neely, KPCC Southern California Radio and LAist
- 2022: "How Pennsylvania's Biggest Pension Fund Squandered Billions, Hurt Taxpayers and Triggered an FBI Investigation" by Craig McCoy, Joseph DiStefano, and Angela Couloumbis, The Philadelphia Inquirer and Spotlight PA

Articles:
1. "FBI probe of massive Pa. pension fund seeks evidence of kickbacks or bribery", May 16, 2021
2. "Internal PSERS documents show how Pa's biggest pension fund got key financial calculation wrong", May 30, 2021
3. "Facing FBI probe, PSERS backtracks on disclosure that staffers were on both sides of real estate dealings", June 8, 2021
4. "In a revolt, dissidents on PSERS board lobby colleagues to fire the fund’s leaders and set a new investment strategy", June 9, 2021
5. "Six of 15 board members of embattled Pa. pension fund officially call for removal of its top command", June 10, 2021

- 2023: "Legal Weed, Broken Promises" by Adam Elmahrek, Paige St. John, Robert J. Lopez, Ruben Vives, Marisa Gerber, Kiera Feldman, and Brian van der Brug, Los Angeles Times
