= Fred M. Hechinger Grand Prize for Distinguished Education Reporting =

The Fred M. Hechinger Grand Prize for Distinguished Education Reporting is the United States' top annual prize for journalism about education. It has been awarded each year since 1972 by the Education Writers Association, the national group for reporters and editors who cover education issues. The Hechinger Prize is awarded to the top work of journalism among the first-place winners in the association's annual National Awards for Education Reporting.

It is named for Fred M. Hechinger, the longtime education editor of The New York Times.

== List of winners ==
- 1972: John Matthews, The Washington Star
- 1973: William Grant, The Detroit Free Press
- 1974: James Nolan and Linda Stahl, The Louisville Courier-Journal
- 1975: Jonathan Neumann, Daily Hampshire Gazette (Northampton, Mass.)
- 1976: James Worsham and Marguerite Del Guidice, The Boston Globe
- 1977: Lou Antosh, The Philadelphia Bulletin
- 1978: Stanley Moulton and Laurel Sorenson, Daily Hampshire Gazette
- 1979: Staff of 10 writers, The Charlotte Observer
- 1980: Rena W. Cohen, The Daily and Sunday Herald (Arlington Heights, Ill.)
- 1981: Mary Bishop, Thomas Ferrick, Jr. and Donald Kimelman, The Philadelphia Inquirer
- 1982: Fred Anklam and Nancy Weaver, The Clarion-Ledger
- 1983: Robert Frahm, The Journal Times (Racine, Wisc.)
- 1984: Cindy Goodaker, The Oakland Press
- 1985: Janet Groat, The Macon Telegraph & Tribune
- 1986: Ricardo Gandara, The Albuquerque Tribune
- 1987: Emily Sachar, New York Newsday
- 1988: Team of 14 reporters from The Chicago Tribune
- 1989: Emily Sachar, New York Newsday
- 1990: Ann Carnahan and Tony Pugh, The Rocky Mountain News
- 1991: Theresa Churchill, Ron Ingram and Carol Alexander, Herald & Review (Decatur, Ill.)
- 1992: Kimberly J. McLarin, The Philadelphia Inquirer
- 1993: Stephen Henderson, Lexington Herald-Leader
- 1994: Neil A. Borowski, Laura Bruch, Thomas Ferrick, Craig McCoy, Dale Mezzacappa, John Woestenliek and Martha Woodall, The Philadelphia Inquirer
- 1995: Dudley Althaus, The Houston Chronicle
- 1996: Robert Frahm and Rick Green, The Hartford Courant
- 1997: Jacques Steinberg, The New York Times
- 1998: Deb Kollars, The Sacramento Bee
- 1999: Tim Simmons, The News and Observer
- 2000: Kenneth Weiss, the Los Angeles Times
- 2001: Patrick Healy, The Boston Globe
- 2002: Eric Eyre and Scott Finn, The Charleston Gazette
- 2003: Christine Willmsen and Maureen O'Hagan, The Seattle Times
- 2004: Joshua Benton, Holly Hacker and Herb Booth, The Dallas Morning News
- 2005: Linda Lutton, Kati Phillips and Jonathan Lipman, The Daily Southtown
- 2006: Jean Rimbach and Kathleen Carroll, The Bergen Record
- 2007: Martha Irvine and Robert Tanner, Associated Press
- 2008: Blake Morrison and Brad Heath, USA Today
- 2009: Bob Hohler, Boston Globe, "Failing Our Athletes: The Sad State of Sports in Boston Public Schools"
- 2010: Bloomberg News: "Education, Inc."
- 2011: Daniel Golden and Oliver Staley, Bloomberg News
- 2012: David Jackson and Gary Marx, Chicago Tribune
- 2013: Alex Blumberg, Ben Calhoun, Ira Glass, Sarah Koening, Alex Kotlowitz, Linda Lutton, Miki Meek, Jonathan Menjivar, Lisa Pollak, Brian Reed, Robyn Semien, Alissa Shipp, Julie Snyder, and Nancy Updike of WBEZ (Chicago), This American Life
- 2014: Nikole Hannah-Jones of ProPublica
- 2015: Cara Fitzpatrick, Lisa Gartner and Michael LaForgia, Tampa Bay Times
- 2016: Brian Rosenthal, Houston Chronicle
- 2017: John Woodrow Cox, The Washington Post
- 2018: Hannah Dreier, ProPublica, New York and The New York Times Magazine
- 2019: Jennifer Smith Richards of the Chicago Tribune, and Jodi S. Cohen and Lakeidra Chavis of ProPublica Illinois
- 2020: Ian Shapira of The Washington Post
- 2021: Laura Bauer and Judy Thomas of The Kansas City Star
- 2022: Jodi S. Cohen and Jennifer Smith Richards of ProPublica and the Chicago Tribune
- 2023: Brandi Kellam, Louis Hansen, and Gabriel Sandoval, Virginia Center for Investigative Journalism at WHRO-TV and ProPublica
