= Beer Chips =

American brand of thick-cut kettle style chips

Beer Chips is a brand of thick-cut kettle style chips with alcohol flavours, invented by Brett Stern in around 2005. The chips are covered with a heavy coating of sugar, honey, and salt, and are covered in beer. These chips are non-alcoholic as the alcohol is removed during the making. The SouthtownStar reviewed the company's beer, margarita, and bloody mary flavors, which they said were tasty. Beer chips are produced in various flavors, such as buffalo wing, margarita shot, barbecue, and pretzel.

The product is distributed in Oregon, California and Texas. In 2010 Stern sold the company to Barrel O’ Fun for an undisclosed sum of money.

== See also ==
- List of deep fried foods
