= Robert Nichol =

Robert Nichol may refer to:

- Robert Nichol (Canadian politician) (c. 1780–1824), businessman, judge and political figure in Upper Canada
- Robert Nichol (cinematographer), Canadian cinematographer, director, and writer
- Robert Nichol (British politician) (1890–1925), British member of parliament for East Renfrewshire, 1922–1924
- Robert Nichol (cricketer) (1924–1996), Scottish cricketer

== See also ==
- Robert Nichols (disambiguation)
- Robert Nicoll (1814–1837), Scottish poet
- Rob Nicol, New Zealand cricketer
