= William R. Clabby =

American journalist and editor

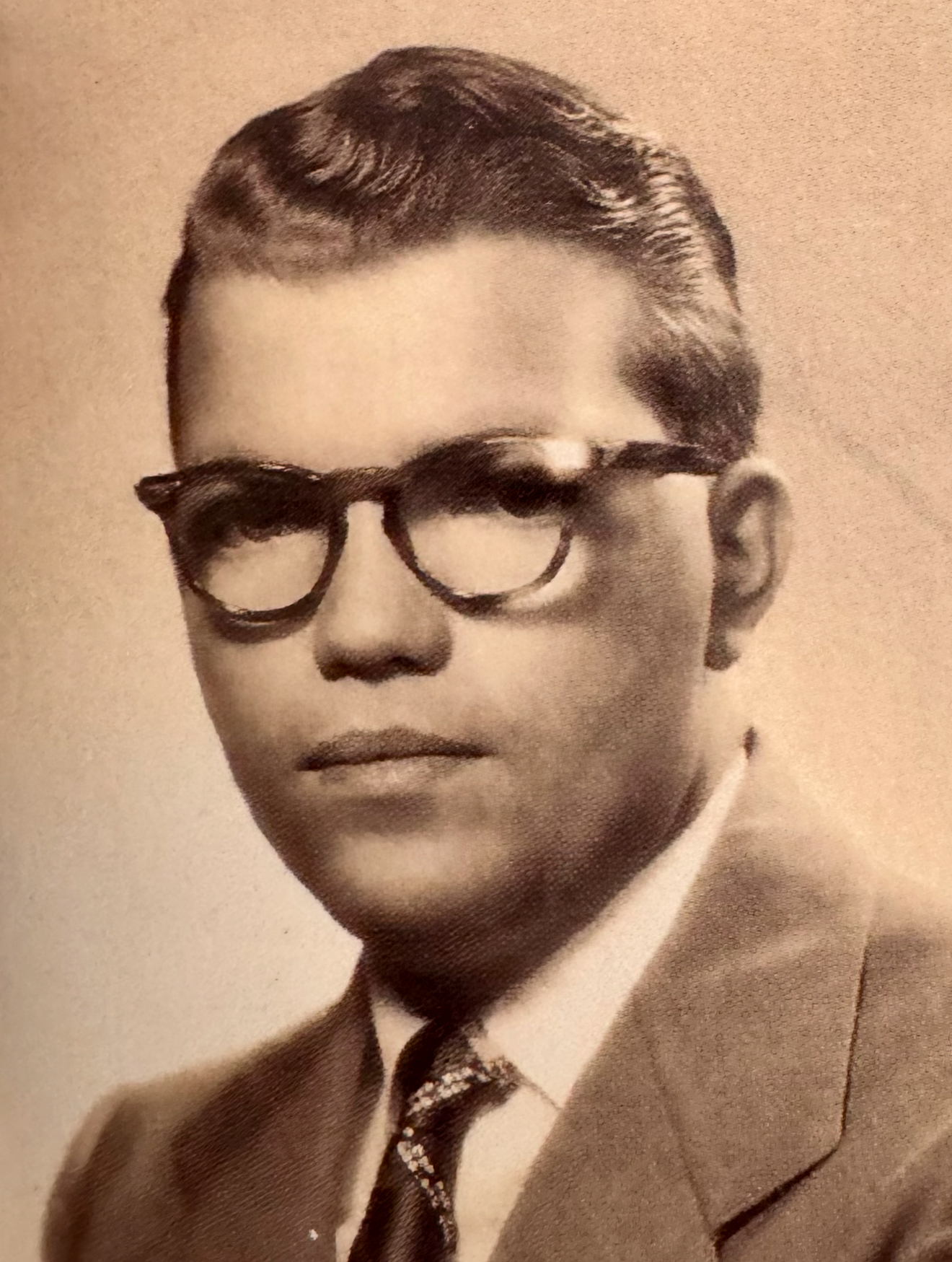
- Born: 1931; Waterloo, Iowa, U.S.
- Died: December 9, 1997 (aged 66); Marietta, Georgia, U.S.
- Education: B.A. Journalism
- Alma mater: Iowa State Teachers College; State University of Iowa
- Occupations: Journalist; Editor
- Years active: 1953–1996
- Awards: Gerald Loeb Award for Newspapers; 1961

William R. Clabby (1931 – December 9, 1997) was an American journalist and editor for The Wall Street Journal, and an executive for various Dow Jones news companies. He shared the 1961 Gerald Loeb Award for Newspapers.

== Early life ==
William Clabby was born in 1931 in Waterloo, Iowa, to Pearl Marie (Bloes) and James Francis Clabby. He was the eldest brother to his sister Joan and brothers James J. and Richard John.

Clabby attended St. John's School and Sacred Heart High School, graduating in 1949. In high school, he was a writer and photographer for the school newspaper, the Banner. He also acted in the Senior play, "Stardust".

While attending Iowa State Teachers College, Clabby served as the associate editor of the school newspaper, The College Eye. He transferred to the State University of Iowa and, in 1952, was appointed editor in chief of the school newspaper, The Daily Iowan, for his senior year. In May 1953, he received the second place award from the Theta Sigma Phi professional journalism sorority for the best photograph published in the Iowan during the past year. Clabby was elected into the Omicron Delta Kappa national men's honorary society before receiving his B.A. in Journalism in June 1953.

Clabby supported himself for a period of time working for Rath Packing Company.

=== Student election controversy ===
The 1953 State University of Iowa student council election held on March 25 had some irregularities that led to a new election being held on May 6. The Young Democrats accused the student council of mismanaging the March election, allowing several students to be elected by illegal methods. Clabby covered the election and the controversies surrounding it in The Daily Iowan, including editorial commentary discussing the issues and calling for a new election code.

Retiring student council members David Stanley and Carl Zimmerman presented charges to the board of publications on May 14 accusing Clabby of distorting facts, editorializing in news stories, and violating other objective journalism rules. The board, made up of students and faculty members, oversaw the Iowan. Stanley and Zimmerman demanded that Clabby be removed from the newspaper or be severely reprimanded.

The board cleared Clabby of all charges on May 22, finding the charges were unsubstantiated and that any errors in Clabby's reporting were not "a purposeful or malicious distortion or omission of facts, or an intentional violation of the rules of objective journalism."

== Career ==
The Chicago bureau of The Wall Street Journal offered Clabby a job shortly before he graduated from university. He started as a copyreader before being promoted to assistant news editor in 1955. In 1961, he was named the assistant managing editor of the Southwest edition of the Journal, which was published by the Dallas bureau. That year, he was part of the Journal team that received the 1961 Gerald Loeb Award for Newspapers. He was promoted to managing editor of the New York City bureau and a special writer for the page one department in 1966. During his tenure, Clabby pioneered satellite news services for the Journal.

Clabby was appointed the managing editor of the AP-Dow Jones Economic Report and Financial Wire in 1971.

Dow Jones and Bunker Ramo Corporation created DJ News-Recall in 1974, a joint venture providing a computerized retrieval service giving access to stories from the Dow Jones News Service, the Journal, and Barron's Magazine. Clabby took on the additional role of managing editor of the new service.

In 1977, Clabby was appointed general manager of news services for Dow Jones & Company. The newly created position put him in charge of the performance of Dow Jones News Service. He was named vice president of the Dow Jones Financial Information Services Group in 1980.

Dow Jones launched the television program The Wall Street Journal Business Report in 1978. Clabby served as an editorial advisor for the show.

The Associated Press, Dow Jones, and Telerate created AP-Dow Jones Telerate Co. in 1983 to distribute Telerate's computerized financial information services outside the U.S. and Canada, with Clabby serving on the board of directors. In 1992, Dow Jones restructured the subsidiary and its Information Services Group into three operating groups: Dow Jones-Telerate, Resources, and Business Information Services. Clabby was named the senior vice president and executive editor of information services responsible for news operations within the Resources group.

Clabby retired in 1996.

== Personal life ==
Clabby met Joann Caroll in high school. They married on August 10, 1952, while Joann was an Art major and president of her sorority at the Iowa State Teachers College. Joann was the daughter of Mildred L. (Conger) and Edmund J. Carroll.

The couple's first child was born in May 1953 while Clabby was defending his student council election reporting. In total, the Clabby's had 10 children – seven daughters and three sons.

The couple moved to Marietta, Georgia in 1996, where Clabby died of complications from Parkinson's disease on December 9, 1997.
