= Patrick Healy (journalist) =

New York Times Editor. CNN political analyst (born 1971)

- Born: August 31, 1971; Boston
- Education: Tufts University
- Occupation: Journalist
- Awards: Livingston Award (2002); Fred M. Hechinger Grand Prize for Distinguished Education Reporting (2002)

Patrick Durham Healy (born August 31, 1971) is currently an assistant managing editor at The New York Times. He has previously written for The Union Leader, Foster's Daily Democrat, The Chronicle of Higher Education, and The Boston Globe.

== Media career ==
After reporting for New Hampshire newspapers The Union Leader and Foster's Daily Democrat, he worked for as a reporter and editor for The Chronicle of Higher Education from 1994 to 2000.

Healy was a reporter for the Boston Globe from 2000 to 2004. His series on grade inflation at Harvard University, "Harvard's Quiet Secret", won the 2001 Fred M. Hechinger Grand Prize for Distinguished Education Reporting and the 2002 Livingston Award for Local Reporting.

Healy joined The New York Times in January 2005 as a political reporter. In 2021, Healy became the Deputy Editor of Opinion for the Times. In May 2025, Healy became assistant managing editor, overseeing Standards and Trust at the Times.

== Controversy ==
=== Coverage of 2004 presidential campaign ===
Healy's coverage of John Kerry's 2004 presidential campaign for the Globe was criticized for inaccuracies and misquotations unflattering to Kerry that required the publication of several corrections, as well as Healy's speculation in print about Kerry's wife and marriage.

=== Coverage of Bernie Sanders ===
In 2024, Fairness & Accuracy in Reporting (FAIR) criticized Healy (then deputy opinion editor at the Times) for an opinion piece he wrote on democratic socialist Bernie Sanders' Democratic National Convention speech, which Healy described as promoting policies unpopular with moderates. FAIR disputed Healy's article, saying that many of Sanders's policy proposals were broadly popular.

=== Departure by Paul Krugman ===
After leaving the Times in 2024, opinion columnist and Nobel Prize-winning economist Paul Krugman primarily blamed Healy for his departure. Krugman, who wrote for the Times opinion pages since 2000, stated that he was singled out for heavy editing by Healy, something he and other Times columnists had not been subject to in the past. He said that Healy "rewrote crucial passages" and "both made my life hell and left the columns flat and colorless."

=== Coverage of Zohran Mamdani ===
In July 2025, a Times report about New York City mayoral candidate Zohran Mamdani's 2009 application to Columbia University was widely criticized, including for its failure to identify a source as white supremacist Jordan Lasker, and also using hacked materials for the report. The coverage was celebrated by right-wing activist Christopher Rufo. Semafor reported that the Times pushed for the publication of the story to avoid being scooped, and that the coverage on Mamdani is divisive even among the Times' newsroom.

The criticism prompted Healy to post an 11-part defense on social media platform X (formerly Twitter). An article on The Guardian criticized the coverage as "a crusade against Mamdani".
