= Bob Hohler =

American journalist (born 1951)

Robert T. Hohler
- Born: October 23, 1951 (age 74); Boston, Massachusetts, US
- Education: Suffolk University
- Occupation: Journalist

Robert T. Hohler (born October 23, 1951) is an American investigative sports journalist for The Boston Globe. He also writes in-depth news stories ("enterprise reporting") for The Globe. Hohler was The Globe's Boston Red Sox beat reporter during their 2004 championship run.

== Biography ==
Hohler was born on October 23, 1951, in Boston, and a graduate of Suffolk University. He worked at the Monadnock Ledger, and then at the Concord Monitor beginning in 1983. While a columnist at the Concord Monitor, he wrote the book, I Touch the Future: The Story of Christa McAuliffe, which describes the life of New Hampshire teacher Christa McAuliffe who died aboard the space shuttle in 1986.

He subsequently joined The Globe in 1987 as a political reporter, including work from 1993 to 2000 at the Globe’s Washington bureau. From 2000 to 2004, he was the beat writer for the Boston Red Sox, including for the 2004 run in which the team captured their first championship since 1918. He stated that covering the Red Sox "was the greatest challenge of [his] career.”

Hohler authored a seven-part series chronicling the poorly-funded athletics programs of the Boston Public Schools.

== Awards ==
- 1985 Associated Press Feature Work Award
- 2007 Salute to Excellence Award from the National Association of Black Journalists
- 2009 Fred M. Hechinger Grand Prize for Distinguished Education Reporting, for Failing Our Athletes: The Sad State of Sports in Boston Public Schools.
- 2010 Dick Schaap Award for Outstanding Journalism
- 2010 Award for Excellence in Coverage of Youth Sports, presented by the John Curley Center for Sports Journalism at Penn State, for his series "Failing our Athletes," about the plight of athletic programs and student-athletes in Boston public schools.

== Works ==
- I touch the future: the story of Christa McAuliffe, author (Random House, 1986, ISBN 978-0-394-55721-2)
- The Best American Sports Writing 2007, contributor (Houghton Mifflin, 2007 ISBN 978-0-618-75116-7)
