= Paige St. John =

American journalist

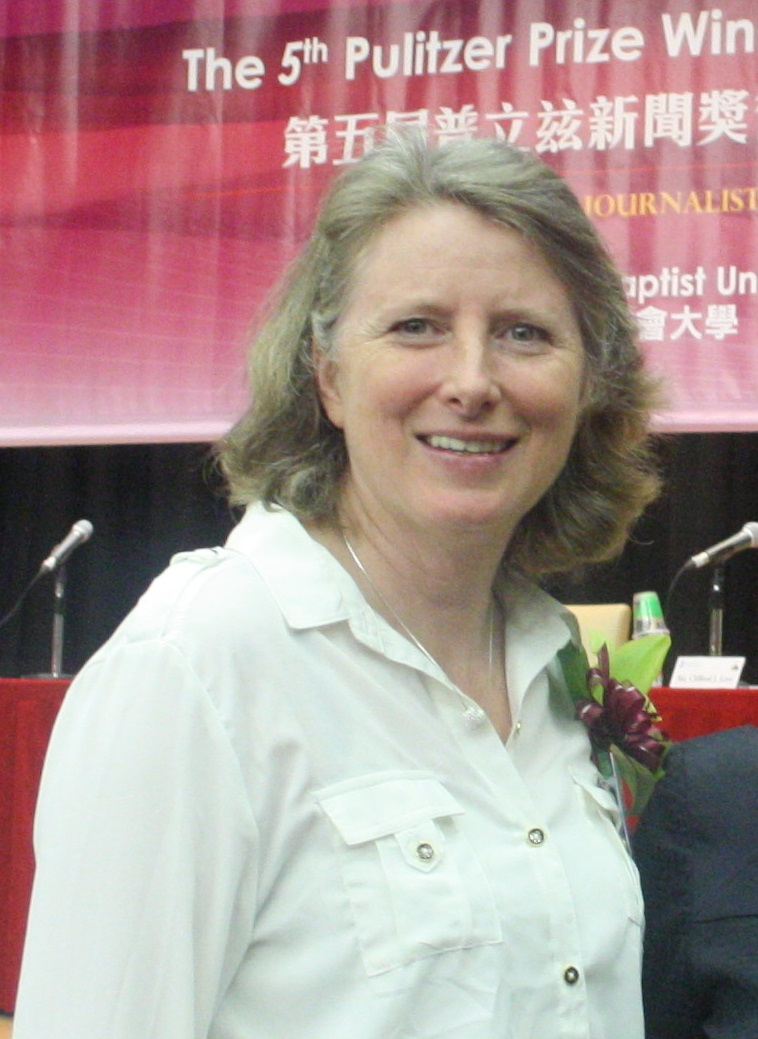
- Paige St. John in 2012
- Education: Southern Illinois University Edwardsville
- Occupation: Investigative reporter for the Los Angeles Times
- Spouse: John Wark
- Awards: Pulitzer Prize for Investigative Reporting 2011 Florida's Insurance Nightmare; Gerald Loeb Award for Local Reporting 2023 Legal Weed, Broken Promises – co-author

Paige St. John is an American journalist with the Los Angeles Times. Before joining the Times, St. John was at the Sarasota Herald-Tribune, where she earned the 2011 Pulitzer Prize for Investigative Reporting. The Pulitzer was the Herald Tribune's first, "for her examination of weaknesses in the murky property-insurance system vital to Florida homeowners, providing handy data to assess insurer reliability and stirring regulatory action."

== Life ==
St. John graduated from Southern Illinois University Edwardsville in the early 1980s.

She joined the LA Times Sacramento bureau in July, 2012. She began her career at The Detroit News. Later, she worked for the Associated Press in Traverse City, Michigan and Charleston, West Virginia. St. John went to Florida to become Gannett's state house bureau chief, and then joined the Herald-Tribune in 2008.

The Pulitzer Prize was awarded to St. John for her series "Florida's Insurance Nightmare," which discussed the Florida property insurance industry. St. John spent two years investigating the state's insurance system, and her series had already been recognized with the Scripps Howard Award, National Headliner Award, and Investigative Reporters and Editors Award. The 2011 Pulitzer jury said St. John, who was involved in the development of Internet applications for insurance analysis, offered "handy data to assess insurer reliability" and prompted legislative reforms. St. John was chosen by the 2011 Pulitzer jury over three other finalists: Walt Bogdanich, Sam Roe, and Jared S. Hopkins.

In June 2019, St. John began hosting the Man in the Window podcast, which is produced by the Los Angeles Times and Wondery. The series covers the case of the Golden State Killer, a serial rapist and murderer tied to hundreds of crimes from 1974 to 1986 across California.

St. John received the 2023 Gerald Loeb Award for local reporting for her contribution to the series "Legal Weed, Broken Promises".

== Family ==
She is married and has a daughter; her husband, John Wark, was a Pulitzer Prize finalist while working for the Orlando Sentinel.
