= James C. Tanner =

American journalist (1926–2019)

- Born: February 27, 1926; Killeen, Texas, U.S.
- Died: December 5, 2019 (aged 93); Houston, Texas, U.S.
- Resting place: Bellwood Cemetery, Houston, Texas, USA
- Education: University of Texas at Austin (BA)
- Occupation: Journalist
- Employer: The Wall Street Journal
- Awards: Gerald Loeb Award; 1961

James Calhoun Tanner (February 27, 1926 – December 5, 2019) was an American journalist who covered the oil and gas industry for The Wall Street Journal for many years. He was part of the team that won the 1961 Gerald Loeb Award for Newspapers.

== Early life ==
Tanner was born on February 27, 1926, in Killeen, Texas. He earned his B.A. in journalism from the University of Texas at Austin.

Tanner served in the U.S. Army during World War II. After the war, he was commissioned as a first lieutenant in the Texas National Guard.

== Career ==
Tanner began his career with the Valley Morning Star. He then served as the Killeen bureau chief for the Temple Telegram.

In 1949, Tanner and his wife, Trinnia, founded the Killeen Publishing Company to purchase and operate the Killeen Daily Herald the following year. Tanner was the president and editor, while Trinnia was the treasurer and a columnist. In 1954, Tanner sold the newspaper to James Gresham and joined the Dallas office of The Wall Street Journal.

Tanner covered the oil and gas industry as a staff reporter for the Journal. In 1961, he was part of the Journal team that received a Gerald Loeb Award for "New Millionaires". He received the Frank Kelley Memorial Award for excellence in journalism from the American Association of Professional Landmen in 1968 for the article "Food from Fuel", which tells the story of T. W. Murray's rise to prominence in the oil industry. Tanner was the natural resources editor by 1977, and oil editor when he left the paper in 1981.

In 1981, Tanner was appointed Vice President in charge of the newly created international publications division of the Petroleum Information Corporation, where he edited Petroleum Information International, a global energy newsletter.

Tanner returned to The Wall Street Journal by 1986. In 1993, he was included in Forbes magazine's MediaGuide 500: A Review of The Nations Most Important Journalists.

== Personal life ==
Tanner married Trinna Lanelle Farley in Temple, Texas, on April 4, 1947. Trinna was born in Temple on May 13, 1928.

Tanner retired from the Texas National Guard as a first lieutenant in 1960.

Trinna died on May 3, 2015, in Houston, Texas. Tanner died in Houston on December 5, 2019.
