= Richard F. Janssen =

American journalist (1933–2008)

- Born: March 7, 1933; St. Louis, Missouri, U.S.
- Died: June 28, 2008 (aged 75); Sarasota, Florida, U.S.
- Education: Washington University in St. Louis (BA)
- Occupation: Journalist
- Years active: 1957–1991
- Employers: The Wall Street Journal; Business Week
- Awards: Gerald Loeb Award

Richard Frederick Janssen, Jr., (March 7, 1933 – June 28, 2008) was an American journalist who received a Gerald Loeb Award in 1961.

== Early life ==
Janssen was born in St. Louis, Missouri, on March 7, 1933. He graduated from Beaumont High School in 1951, where he won second prize in an essay contest sponsored by the Women's Advertising Club of St. Louis, and received an Honorable Mention in the national Scholastic Writing Awards.

Janssen studied political science at Washington University on a partial scholarship. He was a member of the Alpha Sigma Phi fraternity and elected to Phi Beta Kappa. In 1954, he received his B.A. in Liberal Arts. After graduation, he was commissioned as a Second Lieutenant in the United States Army, entering active duty in 1955.

== Career ==
Janssen began his journalism career in 1957 as a business writer for The Wall Street Journal in Chicago, Illinois. In 1961, he was part of a team that received the Gerald Loeb Award for Newspapers for "New Millionaires". While at the Journal, Janssen served as an economics correspondent in Washington, D.C., bureau chief in London, and news editor in New York City.

In 1981, Janssen left the Journal for Business Week. He retired from the magazine in 1991.

== Personal life ==
Janssen and Jerry Ann Voss of St. Louis became engaged in 1954 and married in 1955. They had two children.

The couple was living in Millrift, Pennsylvania when Jerry died on January 12, 1987.

When Janssen retired in 1991, he moved to Sorrento East, Florida, buying a home abutting Oscar Scherer State Park He volunteered over 4,000 hours at the park building park benches, maintaining trails, and giving nature walks. He spent several years on the board of Friends of Oscar Scherer State Park.

Janssen married his second wife, Helen, in 1996. Helen worked as a real estate agent in Sarasota, Florida.

On June 28, 2008, Janssen died from a massive stroke while recuperating from a successful surgery that repaired three abdominal aneurysms.

== Bibliography ==
- The Evil I Do (2006), a science fiction novel
- Standing on Holy Ground: The Bible: Stories Retold, Places Revisited (2009), with John White Moore
