= Robert Nicholls =

Robert Nicholls may refer to:

- Robert Nicholls (politician)
- Robert Nicholls (artist)
- Robert Nicholls (professor)

== See also ==
- Robert Nichols (disambiguation)
