= John Gapper =

British writer and journalist (born 1959)

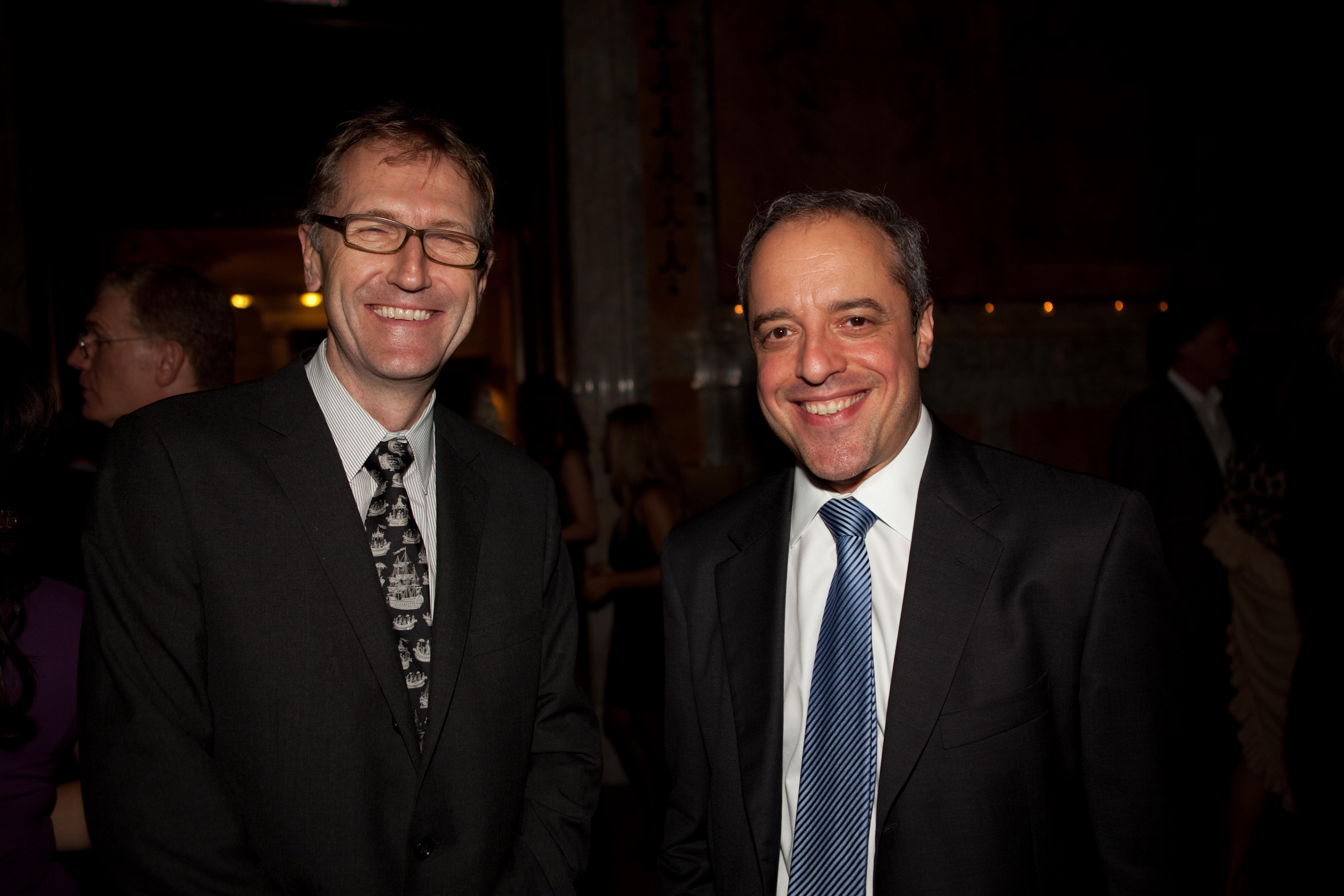
John Gapper (left) and Gary Silverman

John Gapper (born 31 May 1959) is a business columnist who writes a weekly column for the Financial Times. Formerly, he was the newspaper's chief business commentator and opinion and analysis editor. Gapper is also co-author with Nick Denton of All That Glitters: The Fall of Barings and author of two novels, A Fatal Debt and The Ghost Shift.

== Education ==
Gapper was educated at St Benedict's School, Ealing and at Exeter College, Oxford where he studied Philosophy, Politics and Economics. He later became a Harkness Fellow of the Commonwealth Fund of New York, studying US education and job training at the Wharton School of the University of Pennsylvania.

== Career ==
Gapper trained on the Mirror Group training scheme, working at the Tavistock Times. He then worked for the Daily Mirror, Daily Mail and Daily Telegraph before joining the Financial Times in 1987. He became in turn the Financial Times labour editor, banking editor and media editor and was then appointed assistant editor in charge of the comment page. Gapper became a columnist in 2003 and was based in New York between 2005 and 2012.

== Books ==
- All That Glitters: The Fall of Barings
- How To Be A Rogue Trader
- A Fatal Debt
- The Ghost Shift

== Awards ==
- Business commentator, Editorial Intelligence Comment Awards 2011 and 2014.
- Gerald Loeb Award for commentary 2013.
- International commentary, Society of American Business Editors and Writers Awards 2014.
