= Nate White =

American journalist

- Born: March 10, 1910
- Died: April 25, 1984 (aged 74)
- Education: B.A.
- Alma mater: Southwestern Presbyterian University
- Occupation: journalist
- Years active: 1937–1984
- Employer: The Christian Science Monitor
- Awards: Gerald Loeb Award 1959 1960

Nathaniel Ridgway White was an American journalist known for his business and financial reporting at The Christian Science Monitor. He received the second and third Gerald Loeb Awards for Newspapers, the most prestigious award for business journalism.

== Early life ==
White was born on March 10, 1910, in Ohio to John S. and Grace R. White.

He graduated with a bachelor's degree from Southwestern Presbyterian University in 1931.

== Career ==
White joined the Falmouth Outlook in Falmouth, Kentucky, in 1932 and rose to the position of editor. In 1936, he shared third prize for Best Editorial in a Kentucky daily newspaper from the Kentucky Press Association.

He moved to Boston in 1937 to be a radio news writer for The Christian Science Monitor. He was the Monitor's San Francisco correspondent in the early 1940s.

White served as a navy officer during World War II from 1942 to 1945.

After the war, he was the director of information for the Committee for Economic Development from 1948 to 1955, then returned to The Christian Science Monitor as the business and finance editor. He wrote a weekly column called "Trend of the Economy." While at the Monitor, he received two Gerald Loeb Awards for Newspapers: first in 1959 for a series of articles on the problems of recession and recovery, and again in 1960 for a series titled "Horizons Unlimited: Freedom's Answers." He was a finalist for the 1961 Pulitzer Prize for International Reporting.

In 1958, he hosted and moderated American Issues, an 18-part television series of 15-minue debates on economic issues produced by WNET and distributed by National Educational Television.

White became the editor of the American Banker in 1962.

== Religious activities ==
White became a Christian Scientist in 1927 and received his primary class instruction in 1932. He became a public practitioner of Christian Science in 1963. He held various positions in branch churches, including First Reader and chairman of the executive board.

He began serving on the Christian Science Board of Lectureship in 1969, and made a number of lecture tours around the country throughout the 1970s.

== Personal life ==
White was married to Mary Carolyn Lowndes White.

He died in Palm Beach, Florida on April 25, 1984.
