= David R. Jones (journalist) =

American journalist

- Born: 1931 or 1932 (age 93–94); Connellsville, Pennsylvania, US
- Education: B.A. Journalism; M.A. American History
- Alma mater: Pennsylvania State University; New York University
- Occupation: Journalist
- Years active: 1957–1997
- Employers: The Wall Street Journal; The New York Times
- Awards: Gerald Loeb Award for Newspapers; 1961; 1963

David Rhodes Jones Jr. (born 1931 or 1932) is an American journalist. He reported for and edited The Wall Street Journal and The New York Times. He received two Gerald Loeb Awards for excellence in business and financial journalism.

== Early life ==
Jones was born to Ruth Dillon and David R. Jones in Connellsville, Pennsylvania, in 1931 or 1932. His mother was a teacher, and his father a civil engineer.

== Education ==
Jones attended South Side School in Connellsville. In the 3rd grade play, "Switzerland", he sang a duet with Ruth Schoenborn in the second act and narrated the fourth act.

Jones was cited for having perfect attendance in the tenth grade at Connellsville Joint High School. During high school, he edited the school newspaper, the Coker, served as class treasurer, and became a member of the National Honor Society. He graduated On June 2, 1950, with several scholarships for university.

Jones studied journalism at Pennsylvania State University. He reported for the school newspaper, the Daily Collegian, and spent his summers reporting for his hometown newspaper, The Daily Courier. He was named editor of the Collegian his senior year. He was a member of the Tau Kappa Epsilon fraternity and the Sigma Delta Chi professional journalism fraternity. In 1953, he received a citation for being an outstanding student in the Journalism school. Jones participated in the Air Force ROTC (AFROTC) program, including training at Moody Air Force Base in the summer of 1953. He graduated with his B.A. in Journalism in 1954, then started work on a Master's degree before entering the Air Force in 1955.

While working for The Wall Street Journal, Jones continued his studies at New York University, receiving his M.A. in American History in 1961.

== Military service ==
Jones began his Air Force service as a second lieutenant (his rank acquired through the AFROTC program) at Wright-Patterson Air Force Base on February 14, 1955. He served in the public information branch of the Office of Information Services at the base.

== Career ==
The Wall Street Journal hired Jones after he left the Air Force in 1957. He started in the New York City office, then, in 1961, moved to manage the Pittsburgh bureau. He left the paper in 1963. During his tenure, he received two Gerald Loeb Awards for Newspapers for his work published in the Journal – the first as part of a team in 1961, the second by himself in 1963.

Jones took a month long vacation in Europe before starting at The New York Times Detroit bureau covering Michigan, Ohio, and Indiana. He moved to Washington, D.C., in 1965 to report on labor issues before being promoted to assistant editor of the bureau in 1968. He moved back to New York City the following year when he was promoted to assistant national editor. In 1972, he replaced Eugene L. Roberts Jr. as the paper's national editor.

Jones was named the editor of national editions in 1987. The role involved reconfiguring and developing the eight regional editions of the Times.

Jone's final promotion was to assistant managing editor in 1989. He retired c. 1997.

== Personal life ==
Jones met Mary Lee Lauffer while they were both reporters for the Daily Collegian. They married on October 8, 1955, while Jones was serving in the Air Force. Mary received her B.A. in Journalism earlier that year and was employed as a reporter for the woman's page of the Dayton Journal Herald.

The couple's daughter, Elizabeth, is a founding director of Page 73 Productions, which focuses on developing and producing plays by early-career playwrights in New York City.
