= Stephen Henderson (journalist) =

American journalist (born 1970)

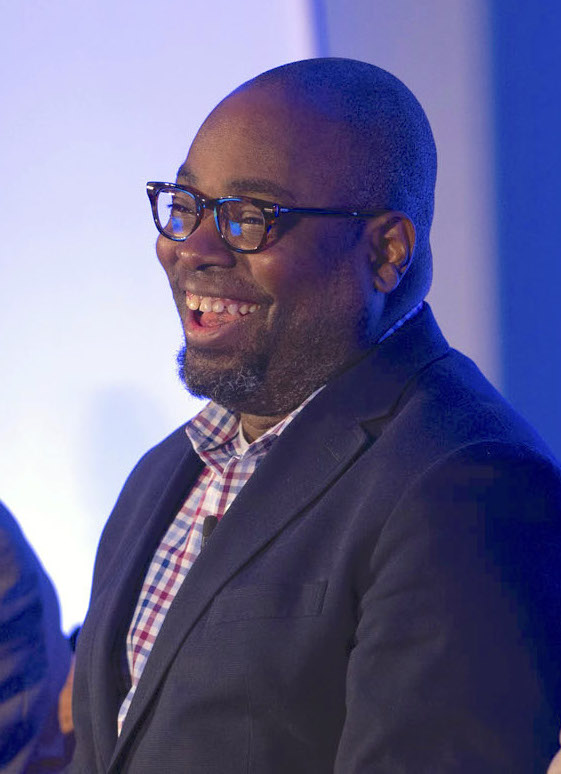
- Henderson in 2015
- Born: 1970 (age 55–56); Detroit, Michigan, U.S.
- Education: University of Michigan
- Occupation: journalist
- Years active: 1991–present
- Children: 2

Stephen Henderson (born November 23, 1970) is an American journalist. Henderson won the 2014 Pulitzer Prize for commentary and the 2014 National Association of Black Journalists Journalist of the Year Award while writing for the Detroit Free Press.

Henderson is the host of Detroit Today, a weekday talk show that features conversations about inequality of all kinds, democratic and civic participation and great ideas from contemporary books. It airs 9–10 am weekdays on WDET-FM, Detroit's NPR station.

He is also the host of Detroit Public Television's American Black Journal, a weekly talk show featuring African American perspectives on topics around arts, culture, and community issues important to the city of Detroit, the state of Michigan and the nation.

Following allegations of his inappropriate sexual behavior, Henderson was terminated by the Detroit Free Press in December 2017. After Henderson threatened to sue, Gannett, the paper's owner, agreed to a settlement.

== Early life and education ==
A native of Detroit, Michigan, Henderson graduated from the University of Detroit Jesuit High School in 1988 and the University of Michigan, where he worked for The Michigan Daily, in 1992.

== Career ==
Henderson has worked for the Baltimore Sun, the Chicago Tribune, the Lexington Herald-Leader, and Knight Ridder as a reporter, editorial writer and editor. He was the Editorial Page Editor and a columnist for the Detroit Free Press from 2009 to 2017.

Henderson has hosted the daily talk show "Detroit Today" on WDET since 2015, and he hosts the weekly talk show "American Black Journal" on Detroit Public Television and co-hosts the news show "MiWeek" on Detroit Public Television. In 2014 he won both the Pulitzer Prize for commentary and the National Association of Black Journalists Journalist of the Year Award for his writing on Detroit's financial crisis. He is also a two-time winner of the Scripps Howard Award for Commentary.

In 2016, Henderson wrote that Michiganders should take legislators who took money to shield Michigan's charter schools from oversight, "sew them into burlap sacks with rabid animals, and toss them into the Straits of Mackinac". After a backlash from conservatives, he tweeted that his remark was "hyperbole". "Everyone knows I don't have access to that much burlap," he said.

On December 6, 2017, Rev. W. J. Rideout III, pastor of Our God's People Church in Detroit, held a press conference to accuse the Detroit news media of covering up sexual harassment cases, including accusations of Henderson sexually harassing female coworkers. Rideout, who hosted a talk show on Detroit's 910 AM, was then suspended by radio station management because he did not identify the alleged victims. In response to Rideout's press conference, the Free Press conducted an internal investigation into the allegations. After the internal review, Henderson was fired from the Detroit Free Press for "inappropriate behavior" towards female employees that had occurred over several years. In response to his firing, Henderson said on his own radio show that he apologized to the women involved and said it was "bad judgement" on his part, but he also said that he disagreed with the decision by the Free Press and would be "exploring legal action." Henderson's attorney has said there was no lawsuit and that a settlement was reached in July 2018 between her client Henderson and his former employers at the Detroit Free Press.

In November 18, 2024, Henderson announced his departure from Detroit public radio, ending his show “Created Equal" due to station “disinvestment."

== Personal ==
Henderson lives in Detroit with his two children.

== Awards ==
- 1993 Fred M. Hechinger Grand Prize for Distinguished Education Reporting
- 2001 American Society of Newspaper Editors Prize for editorial writing
- 2014 Pulitzer Prize for Commentary
- 2014 National Association of Black Journalists Journalist of the Year Award
- 2014 Scripps Howard Award for Commentary
- 2016 Scripps Howard Award for Commentary
