= Michelle Singletary =

American writer

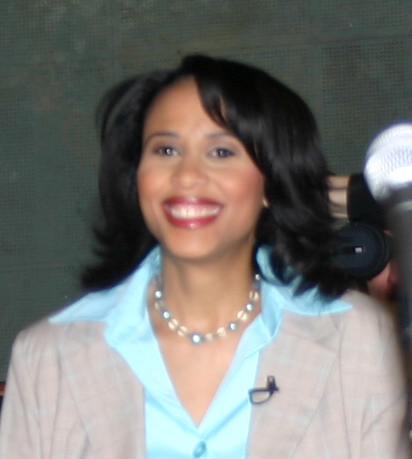
- Occupations: Writer, journalist, financial planner

Michelle Singletary is an American journalist. She is a personal finance columnist for the Washington Post. She won a 2021 Gerald Loeb Award for Commentary for "Sincerely, Michelle" in The Washington Post, and received the Gerald Loeb Lifetime Achievement Award in 2022.

== Life ==
She graduated from University of Maryland, College Park, and Johns Hopkins University. She wrote a series, "Sincerely, Michelle,"

She has appeared on the Amanpour & Co, Morning Edition, The Kojo Nnamdi Show, On Point, and The Long View. She participated in the OneTransaction Campaign.

== Works ==
- The 21-Day Financial Fast: Your Path to Financial Peace and Freedom.
- Spend well, live rich : how to get what you want with the money you have Random House, ISBN 978-0-375-50753-3
- Your money and your man : how you and Prince Charming can spend well and live rich Random House, ISBN 978-1-4000-6378-9
