= Joseph Livingston =

American journalist (1905–1989)

- Born: February 10, 1905; New York City, US
- Died: December 25, 1989 (aged 84); Bucks County, Pennsylvania, US
- Education: B.A.
- Alma mater: University of Michigan
- Occupation: Journalist
- Years active: 1925–1989
- Employers: The Philadelphia Record (1948–1968); The Philadelphia Inquirer (1972–1989)
- Organization: SABEW
- Spouse: Rosalie L. Frenger
- Children: 1
- Awards: Pulitzer Prize 1965; Gerald Loeb Award 1971 1974 1976

Joseph Arnold Livingston (February 10, 1905 – December 25, 1989) was an American business journalist and economist known for his long-running syndicated economics column for which he received a Pulitzer Prize and three Gerald Loeb Awards. He created the Livingston Survey, a twice-yearly economic forecast survey he personally conducted from 1946 until his death in 1989.

== Early life ==
Livingston was born on February 10, 1905, in New York City. After graduating from De Witt Clinton High School, he studied English at the University of Michigan, receiving his bachelor's degree in 1925.

== Career ==
=== Reporter ===
Livingston returned to New York City to begin his journalism career as a cub reporter for the Brooklyn Eagle. By late 1927, he was a staff reporter at The Brooklyn Daily Times. In the second half of the 1920s, he also worked at the Queens County News, The Bronx Home News, and Fairchild's Daily News Record.

=== Financial and economics reporter, editor ===
In September 1929, Livingston began an investment club with some of his university friends, which quickly became underwater when the Great Crash shook the stock market a month later. He realized his university education was insufficient for making informed investment decisions, so he took night classes at the City College of New York from 1929 to 1931 to study investing, accounting, statistics, and economic history. Armed with new knowledge, he repeatedly begged his editor to move him from general reporting to financial reporting until he was eventually fired.

Livingston joined the New York Daily Investment News, rising to executive editor in 1931, and wrote the "Talking It Over" column. In 1934, he moved to Financial World to be the public utility editor.

In 1935, Livingston joined Business Week as an editor and economist. He wrote "The Trend" and "Business Outlook" columns until his departure in 1942. During his tenure, he developed his "story chart" technique, which used charts to dramatically and quickly convey economic information. He extracted the real story from the data, then presented it in a way that the chart and captions clearly expressed everything that was part of the real story and nothing else.

=== World War II ===
Livingston put his journalism career on hold in 1942 to work as an economist for the U.S. government during World War II. He worked for the War Production Board to help start War Progress, an internal weekly report distributed among the various war agencies. The reports were noted for Livingston's use of his story charts to concisely deliver information. He served as editor for the publication and became the economic assistant to Chief of Operations Hiland G. Batchellor. In 1944, Livingston wrote a public affairs pamphlet entitled "Reconversion – the Job Ahead" and assisted in the production of two of the Board's "Critical Programs" reports. He transferred to the Office of War Mobilization and Reconversion in 1945 to help compile analytical and statistical reports for the government.

=== Livingston Survey ===
After the war, Livingston joined The Philadelphia Record in 1945 as the financial editor. The following year, he began sending a detailed questionnaire to economists around the U.S. asking for their forecasts of several economic variables for the next six, twelve, and eighteen months. He conducted the survey, which came to be known as the Livingston Survey, every six months for the rest of his life. In 1978, the Federal Reserve Bank of Philadelphia digitized Livingston's historical data to make it available to researchers. The Bank took over conducting the survey after his death in 1989. The survey is the longest continuous record of economists expectations.

=== Economics columnist ===
When the Record closed in 1947, Livingston moved to The Washington Post, where he started writing his semi-weekly "Minding Your Business" column. The column was renamed "Business Outlook" after a few months and was nationally syndicated later in the year, eventually being printed in over 70 newspapers. He continued writing the syndicated column for the rest of his life.

External image
- Joseph Livingston speaks to student protesters, september 1969

Livingston was hired by The Philadelphia Bulletin in 1948 to be their financial editor. In 1964, he visited Yugoslavia, Poland, Bulgaria, and Czechoslovakia to research the prospects of trade between the U.S. and Eastern Bloc countries. He toured factories and interviewed government officials at all levels. His research resulted in a six-part series entitled "The Powerful Pull of the Dollar" that earned him the 1965 Pulitzer Prize for International Reporting. He stepped down as financial editor in 1968 to focus on outside writing, but continued as an economics columnist.

A 1970 column reporting on his six-week investigation into Howard Butcher and suspicious transactions involving Penn Central stock earned Livingston the 1971 Gerald Loeb award for newspapers. While still writing for the Bulletin, Livingston taught an economics class ("Seminar on Contemporary Economic Trends") at Temple University in 1971 and 1972.

In 1972, Livingston left the Bulletin for The Philadelphia Inquirer, where he continued writing his economics columns and co-wrote a regular chess column. His decades as a financial writer were honored in 1974 by the first Gerald Loeb Memorial Award. He wrote a 5-part series of columns in 1975 entitled "The Second Battle of Great Britain" on the country's economic difficulties that earned him both the 1975 Bache Halsey Stuart Award from the Overseas Press Club and the 1976 Gerald Loeb award for Columns/Editorial In 1981, Livingston spent more than five weeks in Britain interviewing government officials, bankers, businessmen, labor leaders, workers, and members of Parliament for a five-part series entitled "English Lessons for America" that compared the U.S. and British economies and earned him the 1981 Overseas Press Club award for Best Business News Reporting from Abroad.

=== Book ===
Livingston's book, The American Stockholder, was published in 1958. The book discusses the role of stockholders, finding that the average stockholder plays an insignificant role.

=== Radio ===
In 1961, Livingston recorded the miniseries The Evolution of the American Economic Revolution for the Voice of America.

Livingston contributed the "Business Page" feature on WCAU radio's Evening Edition from 1962 to 1964.

== Personal life ==
Livingston met Rosalie Logise Frenger while they were both students at the University of Michigan. Rosalie, born October 19, 1903, in Las Cruces, New Mexico Territory, was the daughter of Clara Jacoby and New Mexico District Judge Numa C. Frenger. She was a correspondent for the El Paso Times and the El Paso Herald, and was a teacher at the Las Cruces Union High School. They married on September 26, 1927, at the Frenger family home in Las Cruces in a ceremony presided over by her father.

The couple initially lived in the Bronx. Rosalie joined an insurance company in 1928 as an editorial writer, and worked as an editor for Young Dancer magazine in the 1930s. They lived in the New York City area until 1942, when they moved to the Washington, D.C., area.

Livingston resumed investing his investment club's money in 1932 and 1933. The club's portfolio finally became profitable in 1935. His friends, not wanting to press their luck, decided to cash-out and dissolve the club. Livingston and his wife used their proceeds to purchase a farm in Bucks County, Pennsylvania. After the war, they lived in Philadelphia, then returned to Washington, D.C., in 1947. In 1948, they finally settled on their farm in Bucks County while maintaining an apartment in Center City, Philadelphia.

Their daughter, Patricia, was born in 1942. She graduated from Westtown School and Middlebury College, and received her master's degree from the University of Pennsylvania. In 1967, she married Mathew Herban III. She received her PhD in English from the University of Pennsylvania in 1973.

Livingston served as the president of The Franklin Inn Club in 1955. He helped organize the Society of American Business Editors and Writers (SABEW), serving two terms as its first president in 1964 and 1965.

On December 25, 1989, Livingston collapsed while preparing to leave his farm. He was pronounced dead at Doylestown Hospital. Rosalie died in Columbus, Ohio, on February 22, 1992, while visiting her daughter. The couple are buried side-by-side at Forest Hills Cemetery in Ann Arbor, Michigan.

== Awards ==
- 1962 The E. W. Fairchild Award from the Overseas Press Club
- 1965 Pulitzer Prize for International Reporting
- 1967 John Hancock Award for Excellence in business and financial writing, syndicated and news service writers
- 1968 John Hancock Award for Excellence in business and financial writing, syndicated and news service writers
- 1971 Gerald Loeb award for Newspapers
- 1973 John Hancock Award for Excellence in business and financial reporting, syndicated and news service writers
- 1974 Gerald Loeb Memorial Award
- 1975 Bache Halsey Stuart Award from the Overseas Press Club
- 1976 Gerald Loeb award for Columns/Editorial
- 1981 Overseas Press Club award for Best Business News Reporting from Abroad

== Selected bibliography ==
- The American Stockholder. 1958. Philadelphia and New York: J. B. Lippincott Company. 290 pages.
- "The Powerful Pull of the Dollar" series – winner of the 1965 Pulitzer Prize for International Reporting

1. "East Europe Asks Capitalistic Aid", November 8, 1964
2. "Communists Borrow Capitalist Techniques", November 15, 1964
3. "Yugoslavia Treads Capitalistic Byways", November 22, 1964
4. "West Europe Is Chessboard of Geopolitics", November 29, 1964
5. "Russians Seek Trade, But on Equal Status", December 6, 1964
6. "Trade Arguments Called Fallacies", December 13, 1964

- "Howard Butcher: Broker With Too Much At Once", December 6, 1970 – winner of the 1971 Geral Loeb award for Newspapers
- "The Second Battle of Great Britain" series – winner of the 1975 Bache Halsey Stuart Award and the 1976 Gerald Loeb award for Columns/Editorial

1. "Britain Faces Second Battle", July 13, 1975
2. "Wage Freeze Pivotal in Second Battle of Britain", July 14, 1975
3. "Status of the Pound Shows Monetary Optimism", July 15, 1975
4. "Britain's Industrial Troubles Keep Growing Worse", July 16, 1975
5. "The 'Second Battle of Britain' Must Be Won, Too", July 17, 1975

- "English Lessons for America" series – winner of the 1981 Overseas Press Club award for Best Business News Reporting from Abroad

1. "English Lessons for America", August 2, 1981
2. "U.S., Britain are alarmingly alike in lag", August 3, 1981
3. "The 'Iron Lady' doesn't bend to labor", August 4, 1981
4. "Postwar issue: Unemployment versus inflation", August 5, 1981
5. "What an economy needs: The moral equivalent of war". August 6, 1981

== See also ==
- Livingston Survey
