= Lisa Gartner =

American journalist

- Education: Northwestern University
- Occupations: Journalist, writer
- Awards: Pulitzer Prize (2016); George Polk Award (2019); Livingston Award (2016)

Lisa Gartner is an American journalist and writer who won the 2016 Pulitzer Prize for Local Reporting, and the Livingston Award. In 2019, she won a George Polk Award. She graduated from Northwestern University. She has worked for the Washington Examiner, Tampa Bay Times, Philadelphia Inquirer, and the San Francisco Chronicle.

Gartner's Pulitzer-winning project was for with the Tampa Bay Times, and was noted "For exposing a local school board's culpability in turning some county schools into failure factories, with tragic consequences for the community."
