= Philip Moeller (journalist) =

American journalist

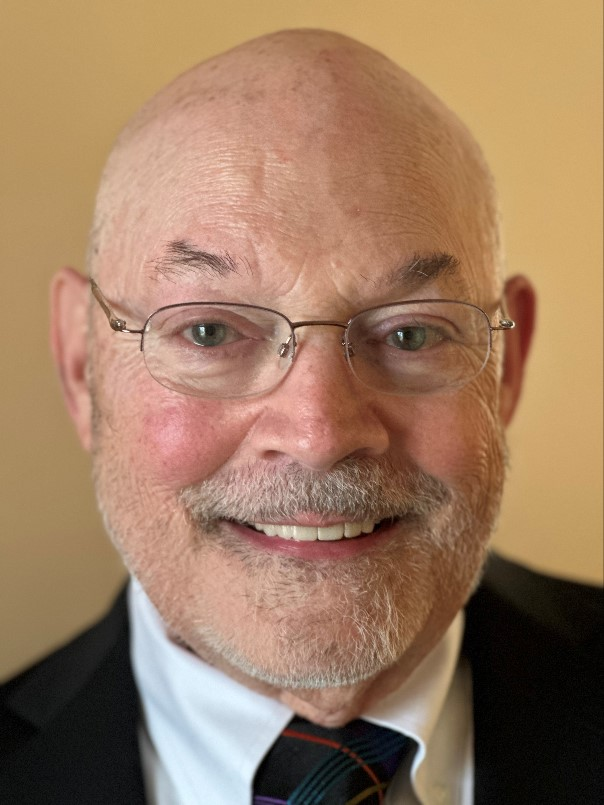
Philip Moeller

Philip Moeller is a journalist and primary author of the "Get What's Yours" series of books published by Simon & Schuster.

Moeller was a reporter for the Charlotte Observer and the Chicago Sun-Times, business editor for the Louisville Courier-Journal and the Baltimore Sun, and editor of The Hartford Business Journal. He later wrote for U.S. News & World Report, Money magazine, and the PBS NewsHour.

In 2015, he co-authored the New York Times bestseller, "Get What's Yours: The Secrets to Maxing Out Your Social Security." In 2016, he wrote "Get What's Yours for Medicare: Maximize Your Coverage, Minimize Your Costs." In 2021, the third book in the series was published: "Get What's Yours for Health Care: How to Get the Best Care at the Right Price." In 2024, the revised edition of "Get What's Yours for Medicare" was published.

He has received awards including the 1979 Gerald Loeb Award for Distinguished Business and Financial Journalism for Small Newspapers and was a Bagehot Fellow in Business and Economics Journalism at the Columbia Graduate School of Journalism. He is a graduate of Princeton University and has a master's degree from the Medill School of Journalism at Northwestern University.
