= Peter St. Onge =

American economist and commentator,

Peter St. Onge is an American economist, commentator, and senior fellow at the Heritage Foundation. He is known for his libertarian-leaning views on taxation, monetary policy, and government regulation. He frequently appears in national media to discuss economic trends and public policy. St. Onge has been a critic of federal income taxes and inflationary fiscal policy.

== Career and views ==
St. Onge has appeared in a variety of media outlets discussing American economic policy. He has been a recurring guest on Fox Business, where he has described "policy-driven inflation," arguing that government spending and central bank policy are the primary drivers of inflation. On other segments, he has criticized how unemployment is calculated, arguing that official metrics often understate underlying economic weaknesses. In an appearance on The Joe Pags Show, he discussed the potential end of the federal income tax, which he believes would promote economic growth by "getting the government out of the way" of economic productivity. He argued that the income tax discourages work and innovation and believes that other forms of taxation, such as tariffs or consumption taxes, are more economically efficient.

St. Onge is also a contributor to op-ed columns such as The Holland Sentinel and the Mises Institute. He has written articles for the Heritage Foundation.
