= Eric Eyre =

American journalist and investigative reporter

Eric Eyre (born c. 1965) is an American journalist and investigative reporter, best known for winning the Pulitzer Prize in investigative reporting for exposing the opioid crisis in West Virginia. He was a statehouse reporter for the Charleston Gazette-Mail. He resigned his position in April 2020. He is also the author of the book, Death in Mud Lick: A Coal Country Fight Against the Drug Companies That Delivered the Opioid Epidemic.

== Career ==
Eyre graduated from Loyola University of New Orleans. He earned his master's degree in Mass Communication at the University of South Florida St. Petersburg. During his time at the university, Eyre worked as an intern at the St. Petersburg Times. Eyre has reported for The Anniston Star of Alabama, the Daily Times-Advocate of California, and the Pottstown Mercury of Pennsylvania.

In 1998 Eyre began covering education, health, and business at the Charleston Gazette, now the Charleston Gazette-Mail. The Gazette-Mail is a daily morning newspaper in Charleston, West Virginia with a daily print circulation of around 37,000. Eyre worked at the Gazette-Mail until 2020, where he balanced his work as a full-time statehouse reporter and his pursuit of investigative projects spotlighting issues in the rural communities of West Virginia.

He also formerly worked at Mountain State Spotlight, where he was a co-founder and senior investigative reporter.

== Awards and recognition ==
Eyre's work has received national recognition on several occasions. He has been the recipient of the following:

- Investigative Reporters and Editors (IRE) Medal
- National Headliners Award
- Fred M. Hechinger Grand Prize in education reporting from the Education Writers Association
- Society of American Business Editors and Writers award
- 2003 Gerald Loeb Award for Small Newspaper for "A License to Steal"
- Association of Health Care Journalists award
- Kaiser Family Foundation fellowship
- Pulitzer Prize in investigative reporting for “courageous reporting, performed in the face of powerful opposition, to expose the flood of opioids flowing into depressed West Virginia counties with the highest overdose death rates in the country”
- 2017 Gerald Loeb Award for Local business journalism for "Painkiller Profiteers"

== Published works ==
Much of Eyre's work has been published through the Charleston Gazette-Mail. Some of his most notable published works include:

- “Death in Mud Lick: A Coal Country Fight against the Drug Companies That Delivered the Opioid Epidemic" (2020)
- “Painkiller Profiteers” (2016)
- “The Meth Menace” (2013)
- “Wired for Waste” (2012)
- “The Well Connected” (2012)
- “Grants, Graft and Greed at Workforce West Virginia” (2009)
- “State of Decay: West Virginia's Oral Health Crisis” (2007)
- “Web of Deceit: The Fall of West Virginia House Education Committee Chairman Jerry Mezzatesta” (2004)
- “Taken for a Ride” (2003)
- “The Long Haul and Broken Promises” (2002)
- “License to Steal” (2002)
