= Robert J. Samuelson =

American journalist (1945–2025)

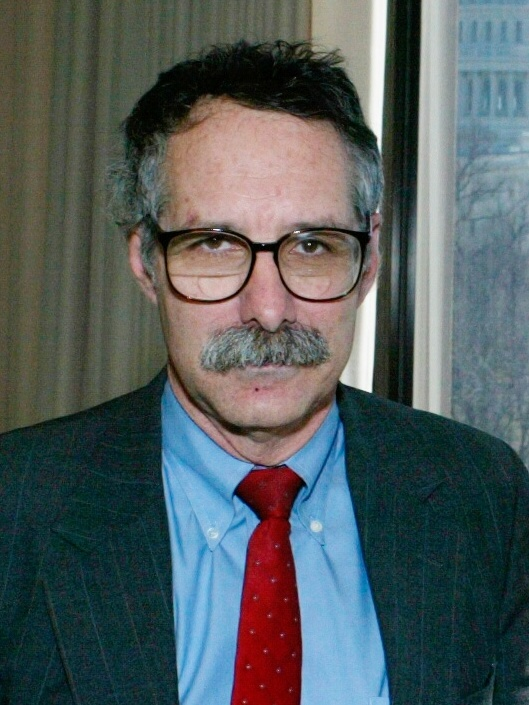
Samuelson in 2004

Robert Jacob Samuelson (December 23, 1945 – December 13, 2025) was an American conservative journalist for The Washington Post, where he wrote about business and economic issues from 1977 to 2020. He was a columnist for Newsweek magazine from 1984 to 2011.

== Career ==
Samuelson began his career in journalism as a reporter on the business desk of The Washington Post in 1969 and left the paper to become a freelancer in 1973. His work has appeared in The Sunday Times, The New Republic and the Columbia Journalism Review. He joined the National Journal in 1976, where he wrote the "Economic Focus" column. He was a contributing editor there from 1981 to 1984, when he left to write for Newsweek. At age 75, Samuelson posted his last op-ed article in The Washington Post on September 14, 2020.

== Personal life and death ==
Samuelson was born in New York City on December 23, 1945, and raised in nearby White Plains, New York. He received his bachelor's degree in 1967 from Harvard University, where he concentrated in government. He and his wife, Judith Herr, lived in Bethesda, Maryland, and have three children. Samuelson died in Bethesda on December 13, 2025, at the age of 79.

== Journalism awards ==
Samuelson received:

- 1993 John Hancock Award for Best Business and Financial Columnist
- National Headliner Award for Feature Column on a Single Subject in both 1992 and 1993; another in 1987 for Best Special Interest Column
- Gerald Loeb Awards for Commentary in 1994, 1986 and 1983; Loeb finalist in 1988 for his columns on the October 1987 Wall Street crash
- An Alicia Patterson Journalism Fellowship in 1982 to research and write about the changes in the U.S. economy since World War II
- 1981 National Magazine Award for Reporting

== Books by Samuelson ==
- The Good Life and Its Discontents: The American Dream in the Age of Entitlement, (Random House: 1995) 368 pages, ISBN 0-8129-2592-0
- Untruth: Why the Conventional Wisdom Is (Almost Always) Wrong, (Random House: 2001) 304 pages ISBN 978-0-8129-9164-2 (trade paperback edition)
- The Great Inflation and Its Aftermath: The Past and Future of American Affluence, (Random House: 2008) 336 pages ISBN 978-0-375-50548-5
