= Robert C. Nichols =

American educational psychologist

Robert Cosby Nichols (born January 24, 1927) is an American educational psychologist and twin researcher. John C. Loehlin, conducted a study of 850 twin pairs to determine the relative importance of genetic and environmental factors on individual differences in personality. The study was published in 1976 as the book Heredity, Environment, and Personality: A Study of 850 Sets of Twins. It was among the first studies examining the potential role of genetic factors in personality, after decades of researchers ignoring the subject. He has also researched the role of genetics in human intelligence.

== Biography ==
Nichols was born in Hopkinsville, Kentucky on January 24, 1927. He was educated at the University of Louisville and the University of Kentucky. He received his Ph.D. in psychology from the latter university in 1954. He then worked as a clinical psychologist at the Veterans Administration for two years before joining the faculty of Purdue University in 1956. In 1955, he served as president of the Houston Psychological Association. In 1961, he joined the National Merit Scholarship Corporation as a research psychologist, where he eventually became vice president for Research. He joined the State University of New York at Buffalo as Professor and Chairman of the Department of Educational Psychology in 1968. In 1969, he was elected a fellow of Division 15 of the American Psychological Association.
