= Daily Southtown =

American newspaper, edited in Chicago

- Type: Daily newspaper
- Owner: Chicago Tribune Media Group (Tribune Publishing)
- Founded: September 11, 1906; 119 years ago
- Language: English
- City: Tinley Park, Illinois
- Country: United States
- Website: www.chicagotribune.com/suburbs/daily-southtown/

The Daily Southtown (formerly SouthtownStar) is a newspaper of the Chicago, Illinois, United States, metropolitan area that covers the south suburbs and the South Side neighborhoods of the city – a wide region known as the Chicago Southland. Its popular slogan is "People Up North Just Don't Get It" (a pun). It is published by the Chicago Tribune Media Group.

== History ==
Founded on September 11, 1906, the Southtown celebrated its 100th year as a paper in 2006. Originally called the Englewood Economist, it was retitled the Southtown Economist in 1924 and began publishing twice weekly. The newspaper relocated from Chicago's Englewood community to the west end of the city in Garfield Ridge in 1968.

The company started publishing a six-day a week edition called the Daily Southtown on February 26, 1978. While the launch of the new publication was already being planned, the launch date was moved up when the Chicago Daily News announced it would publish its last edition March 4, 1978. The company continued to publish its weekly and bi-weekly publications for some time.

In 1986, the Daily Southtown was purchased by Pulitzer Publishing; who sold the paper in 1994 to the American Publishing Company. The paper relocated to suburban Tinley Park in 1997.

On November 18, 2007, The Star, a twice-weekly neighborhood newspaper based in Tinley Park, merged into the Daily Southtown to create the SouthtownStar, which is circulated daily with a special Neighborhood Star pull-out section on Thursdays and Sundays. In 2014, the SouthtownStar was purchased by the Chicago Tribune Media Group along with the other Wrapports Chicago suburban papers. The name was changed back to the Daily Southtown.

The paper maintains bureaus in Chicago city hall and the city's federal courts building.

Like its larger counterparts, the newspaper also entered into the broadcasting business in 1925 with a license to operate radio station WBCN. WBCN started broadcasting on 1130 kHz from the paper's offices at 65th and Halsted. They soon entered into an agreement of time-sharing of the frequency with radio station WENR, then owned by the All-American Radio Company. By the next year, both stations had moved to 1040 kHz, still retaining their time-sharing agreement. By 1927, Chicago financial magnate Samuel Insull had become interested in both WBCN and WENR. Insull, who had been a founder of station KYW, sold his interest in the station. His newly formed Great Lakes Broadcasting bought them both, and moved them on the dial to 870 kHz. When Insull's fortune began to disappear, he sold the licenses of both radio stations to the National Broadcasting Company in 1931. The two were officially merged with WBCN leaving the air in early 1933.

== Awards ==
In 2006, the Southtown was named Newspaper of the Year among the nation's large circulation suburban dailies by Suburban Newspapers of America and the American Press Institute. The judges said: "This is a terrific newspaper – its spot-news coverage is both broad and deep, and its feature stories are as good as those of the country's best newspapers. The newspaper puts a lot of effort into providing value to readers – and it shows."

The paper also won the Illinois Associated Press Award for General Excellence in 2006, the national Fred M. Hechinger Grand Prize for Distinguished Education Reporting, and the Chicago Headline Club's Watchdog Award for Reporting in the Public Interest.

In 2010 photo editor Larry Ruehl and staff photographer Matt Marton received the Sigma Delta Chi Award from the Society of Professional Journalists for feature photography.

== Notable staff ==
Among its resident writers is Phil Kadner, who has written a daily column for two decades. In 2002, he won the Studs Terkel Award for journalistic excellence for writing from a grassroots perspective, and has received several Peter Lisagor Awards for commentary. Of his most recent Lisagor win in 2006, the judges wrote: "His writing is absolutely clean. ... No personal vanity, and eyes open to the world and the ordinary people who are so extraordinary in it."

Paul Ladewski served as the first Daily Southtown sports editor, and he went on to become a Lisagor Award-winner as well as the 2005 Illinois Sports Columnist of the Year. He was the only Chicago beat writer to cover the Michael Jordan era in Chicago from start to finish (1984-1998). As a member of the Baseball Writers' Association of America, in the wake of the steroids controversy, Ladewski touched off a nationwide debate and raised awareness with the only known blank ballot in the 2007 National Baseball Hall of Fame election. In all, he covered more than 3,500 MLB, NBA, NHL and NFL games in multiple roles.

Kevin Carmody, environment reporter, won a 1999 George Polk Award, one of the nation's most prestigious prizes in journalism, for his stories on the official cover-up of the illness and death of employees exposed to toxic metals decades ago in A-bomb factories. His series "Deadly Silence" revealed how hundreds of scientists, tradesmen and secretaries at a Manhattan Project lab at the University of Chicago were carelessly exposed to the toxic metal beryllium, then for 45 years intentionally kept in the dark about the potentially deadly health consequences.

Cornelia Grumman, a 2003 Pulitzer Prize winning editorial writer at the Chicago Tribune for her death penalty editorials, was a reporter at the Southtown. Cathleen Falsani, author of The God Factor and now the religion reporter for the Sun-Times, got her start in newspapers as the religion beat writer for the Southtown. Other writers who cut their teeth on the news business at the Southtown include Mark Konkol 2011 Pulitzer Prize winner for the Chicago Sun-Times and now writer-at-large for DNAInfo.com, author-blogger-columnist Allison Hantschel and David Heinzmann of the Chicago Tribune.
