= Robert E. Nichols =

American journalist

- Born: 1925; Daytona Beach, Florida, US
- Died: September 30, 1996 (aged 71); San Francisco, California, US
- Occupation: journalist
- Employers: San Diego Union; Los Angeles Times
- Organization: SABEW
- Awards: Gerald Loeb Award

Robert E. Nichols (1925 – September 30, 1996) was a business journalist known for his work as the financial editor of The Los Angeles Times and as president of the Society of American Business Editors and Writers. He received two Gerald Loeb Awards. His professional memberships included Sigma Delta Chi and the National Society of Art Directors.

== Early life ==
Nichols was born in Daytona Beach, Florida in 1925. He moved to California in 1926, where he grew up. He attended San Diego State College, St. John's College in Annapolis, Maryland, and George Washington University.

== Career ==
Nichols spent his early career working in Washington, D.C., for the New York Herald Tribune as a national labor correspondent, and CBS as a network correspondent and documentary specialist. He worked for Time, Inc., in New York City as contributing editor for business and finance and the special assistant to the director of corporate special projects.

He returned to California in 1953 to work as the Sunday editor of the San Diego Union. At the same time, he was a correspondent for Time, Life, Sports Illustrated, Architectural Forum, and House & Home magazines. In 1955, he received an honorary mention from the California Newspaper Publishers Association Awards for a series on development in the Southwestern United States.

Nichols moved to the Los Angeles Times in 1961 to be the financial editor, replacing Harold Walsh who left to join EF Hutton as regional director of corporate research. Nichols was a key figure in expanding the financial section and shifting the focus from local to primarily national coverage. He received a Gerald Loeb special achievement award in 1963 for a series on Howard Hughes' business empire and his court fight with Trans World Airlines. He won another Gerald Loeb award the following year for the series "The Price of Security" that provides an in-depth examination of the space and defense industries and their relationship to the California and national economies.

Nichols helped found the Society of American Business Editors and Writers (SABEW). He helped formulate SABEW's code of ethics, was elected treasurer in 1966, and was elected the third president of the organization in 1967.

In 1968, Nichols left the Times to be a special assistant to the Board of Governors of the Federal Reserve for two years.

Nichols joined Bank of America in 1970 as the director of editorial services at the bank's headquarters in San Francisco. He became the director of public relations in 1973. During his tenure, he strongly advocated for the bank to release a voluntary disclosure code, which it did in 1976 – the first in the financial services industry. Nichols retired in 1985.

== Personal life ==
Nichols and his wife Diana had three children – daughters Robin and Kim, and son Craig.

Nichols died in San Francisco, California, on September 30, 1996, from liver cancer.

== Awards ==
- 1955 California Newspaper Publishers Association award for Editorial, honorable mention
- 1963 Gerald Loeb special achievement award for Newspaper
- 1964 Gerald Loeb award for Newspaper

== Selected bibliography ==
- Series winning a 1955 California Newspaper Publishers Association award: (Note: The articles were originally published in the San Diego Union.)

1. "Boom Area Called Modern Eldorado", October 17, 1954
2. "Yuma Area Typical Of New Southwest", October 18, 1954
3. "Phoenix Now Walks In Metropolis Class", October 19, 1954
4. "Churches And Motels Abound", October 21, 1954
5. "Southwest Empire Began With Farms", October 22, 1954
6. "Southwest Nemesis: High Freight Rates", November 1, 1954
7. "Coronado's Scouts Heralded Tourists", November 2, 1954
8. "Arizona Livestock Raisers Optimistic", November 3, 1954

- Series receiving a 1963 Gerald Loeb special achievement award:

1. "Battle of the Billionaires: Howard Hughes Plays 'David' in Fight for Control of TWA", February 18, 1962
2. "Howard Hughes Flies High in Films, Finance", February 19, 1962
3. "Hughes: From Little Bits, a Mighty Fortune", February 20, 1962
4. "Hughes: Oil and Air an Explosive Mixture", February 21, 1962
5. "Feeder Lines Vital Pawns in TWA Battle", February 22, 1962
6. "Upheaval at General Dynamics, Battle to Control TWA Linked", February 23, 1962
7. "Hughes' Future With TWA Up to Judge", February 25, 1962

- "The Price of Security", winner of a 1964 Gerald Loeb award:

1. "Space Race: Are Americans Balking at the End or Means?", July 28, 1963
2. "Immensity of Cold War Economy Forces Exercise in Definition", July 29, 1963
3. "Defense: Still Big Business but Slimmer", July 30, 1963
4. "The Issue: To Create, Produce, Reward", July 31, 1963
5. "Politics: The X Factor in Defense Industry", August 2, 1963
6. "Our Space-Age Dilemma: How Expensive is Fast?"], August 4, 1963
7. "Are U.S. Taxpayers at the Boiling Point?", August 6, 1963
8. "Management Skills Held Key to Survival"], August 7, 1963
9. "The 50-Way Flow: California & the '2nd Tier'", August 12, 1963
10. "No. 1 Military Contractor and How It Grew"], August 13, 1963
11. "Defense Contracting: a Never-Never Land"], August 14, 1963
12. "R for Rattler Hearts, D for Dragonflies", August 15, 1963
13. "The National Security Mechanism: Economic Mainspring or Shackle", August 18, 1963
