= Robert Carter Nicholas =

Robert Carter Nicholas may refer to:

- Robert Carter Nicholas Sr. (1728/29–1780), American lawyer and political figure
- Robert C. Nicholas (1787–1856), United States Senator from Louisiana
- Robert C. Nicholas (New York politician) (1801–1854), New York politician
