= Daniel Howes =

Daniel Howes is an American business columnist and associate business editor of The Detroit News.

He graduated from the College of Wooster in 1983, and from Columbia University with a master's in international affairs. From 1999 to 2003, he was European correspondent and automotive columnist. From 1993 to 1999, he was automotive, investigative, and projects reporter. He was a reporter for The Roanoke Times.

He lives in Bloomfield Hills with his wife; they have a daughter.

== Awards ==
- 2008 Gerald Loeb Award Honorable Mention for Commentary
- Medill award, Northwestern University
