= Kennedy Slide of 1962 =

1962 stock market decline

- Date: December 1961 – June 1962
- Location: United States
- Type: Stock market crash, bear market
- Outcome: S&P 500 declines 22.5%; Dow Jones Industrial Average drops 5.7% (on May 28, 1962); Structural and legislative trading system reforms enacted by the SEC; Full market stabilization achieved following the conclusion of the Cuban Missile Crisis

The Kennedy Slide of 1962, also known as the Flash Crash of 1962, is the term given to the stock market decline from December 1961 to June 1962 during the presidential term of John F. Kennedy. After the market experienced decades of growth since the Wall Street crash of 1929, the stock market peaked during the end of 1961 and plummeted during the first half of 1962. During this period, the S&P 500 declined 22.5%, and the stock market did not experience a stable recovery until after the end of the Cuban Missile Crisis. The Dow Jones Industrial Average fell 5.7%, down 34.95, the second-largest point decline then on record.

== Background ==
Following the Wall Street Crash of 1929, speculators became more cautious and reluctant about holding on to stocks for extended periods of time. As a result, there was an increased trend of pooling on the bear side of the market—betting on stock prices to lower—and pushing stock prices down further. These bear raids allowed many Wall Street investors to make fortunes, for adequate regulation of inside information had not yet become established. Joseph P. Kennedy, a famous and prominent bear raider, had gained much of his fortune through trading in stock pools. As his wealth continued to grow, he later entered the political sphere as a strong supporter of Franklin D. Roosevelt. Kennedy eventually became appointed as the chairman of the U.S. Securities and Exchange Commission, a federal agency established by Franklin D. Roosevelt in order to investigate current speculative operations and prevent a downturn like the 1929 crash. During his term as the head of the commission, Kennedy did a thorough job and made a name for both himself and his family. His success and reputation may have eventually helped place his son in the Presidency during the election of 1960.

During the time period leading up to the Kennedy Slide of 1962, the economy was experiencing a rapid expansion. From February 1951 to December 1959, the real GDP of the United States had risen significantly. Stock prices had been on a steady rise since the late 1940s, and when John F. Kennedy took office in 1961, he promised that the recovery would continue. After continuing to rise through December 1961, however, the stock market experienced a massive decline. Through June 1962, the S&P 500 experienced a 22.5% decline. The Dow Jones Industrial Average dropped 5.7% on May 28, 1962, alone, in what was termed the "Flash Crash of 1962".

== Explanations ==
During the time of the Kennedy Slide, the head of the American Stock Exchange, Edwin Posner, explained to reporters that "this definitely is not panic selling". Instead, he attributed the drop in stock prices as an adjustment from the previous 10 years of increases. With this drop, Posner believed that stocks were reaching their realistic levels.

After a thorough investigation led by a special committee of the U.S. Securities and Exchange Commission, the committee concluded that there were clear signs of incompetence, but none of malfeasance that would have warranted further investigation. The SEC had hoped to figure out the causes of wrongdoing in order to pass legislation that would prevent further mishaps, but it did not find any evidence of such behavior. In its report, the SEC concluded that the downturn in the market was due to "a complex interaction of causes and effects—including rational and emotional motivations as well as a variety of mechanisms and pressures", which led to a "downward spiral of great velocity and force". The end of the report labeled the market slide as an isolated, nonrecurring incident with precipitating causes that were unable to be confidently ascertained.

== Recouping ==
President John F. Kennedy was asked by many to address the public about the state of the economy, but he ultimately decided not to do so. Kennedy's advisors pushed for all sorts of remedies, from reducing the margin requirement to announcing a tax cut of $5–10 billion to holding a "fireside chat" and discussing the health of the economy. Six weeks after deciding on not taking an action, however, Kennedy reduced the margin requirement and decided on a tax cut, hoping to incentivize large, self-financing companies.

The public began gaining confidence after important businessmen and fund managers addressed press about the concerns of the market. J. Paul Getty, an oil tycoon with large investments in Wall Street, addressed the press and explained, "When some folks see others selling, they automatically follow suit. I do the reverse—and buy. I don't think the slide will go on. In fact, I think there will be a rather substantial rise shortly." Walter Benedict, fund manager of the billion dollar mutual fund Investors Planning Corporation, also announced that the market was bullish, stating that his funds had recently purchased $20 million worth of stock. With the backing of successful investors, the public's fears had temporarily subsided, and the stock markets rallied heavily in what became the greatest single day rally since the end of World War II.

Although it seemed like recovery was imminent, the stock market continued to be volatile throughout the month of June. A stable rise did not occur until the end of the Cuban Missile Crisis in October.

== Aftermath ==
This stock market shock was significant, but it had little immediate effects on interest rate premiums in the credit market. During the entire period, the interest rates remained relatively steady. Because there had not been substantial loan losses or bank failures in decades, the bank system remained remarkably stable, preventing the interest rates from spreading upward. The Federal Reserve made only minor interest rate movements, which helped ease panic in the treasury markets.

When comparing the highest and lowest points of the stock market during the Kennedy Slide, the paper values of stocks declined 27% during the period of December 1961 and June 1962. The 1929–1932 bear market, which was a substantial cause of the Great Depression, saw a sharp drop of 89%. Many aspects of the Kennedy Slide of 1962 mirrored those of the Wall Street Crash of 1929, such as the detrimental mix of an extremely volatile stock market, fearful investors, and weak leadership.

== See also ==
- Great Depression
- Stock market crash
- Flash crash
- Cuban Missile Crisis
