= Society for Advancing Business Editing and Writing =

Association of business journalists

The Society for Advancing Business Editing and Writing is an association of business journalists. Originally founded as the Society of American Business Editors and Writers, in 2018, it changed its name "as part of a broader effort to embrace a global focus on business journalism." Its headquarters is at the Walter Cronkite School of Journalism and Mass Communication at Arizona State University in Phoenix, Arizona.

== History ==
The Society of American Business Editors and Writers, or SABEW, was formed in 1964 to promote superior coverage of business and economic events and issues.

The movement began when the late R.K.T. (Kit) Larson, former associate editor of The Virginian-Pilot in Norfolk, Virginia, began talking with Charles C. Abbott of the University of Virginia about "the generally poor reporting of business news in the country's press". Larson organized several small seminars, and in 1961 put together a three-day session that attracted 60 business editors and writers. The success of that seminar resulted in another in 1963.

A permanent organization took shape in 1964 when the Society of American Business Writers held its first meeting in New York City. Joseph Livingston served two terms as the first president of the organization in 1964 and 1965. In 1984, the Society took a major step by voting to place its offices at the University of Missouri School of Journalism. In 2009, the Board of Governors voted to move the Society's headquarters to Arizona State University's Walter Cronkite School of Journalism and Mass Communication in downtown Phoenix, where it was established in September of that year.

== Membership ==
Since 1990, SABEW began offering institutional memberships, and now entire business staffs at major newspapers, business journals, business weeklies, wire services, online publications, and broadcast outlets are members. By 2010, the SABEW has more than 2,000 members are from North America and several countries.

As part of its mission, SABEW sponsors an annual convention and specialized reporting conferences. Since the mid-1990s, it has recognized the best in business and financial news coverage with the annual Best in Business Awards. SABEW has a Canada Chapter which conducted its first Toronto event in 2010.

== See also ==
- Business journalism

== Sources ==
- Official website
