= List of After Words interviews first aired in 2010 =

After Words is an American television series on the C-SPAN2 network’s weekend programming schedule known as Book TV. The program is an hour-long talk show, each week featuring an interview with the author of a new nonfiction book. The program has no regular host. Instead, each author is paired with a guest host who is familiar with the author or the subject matter of their book.

First air date (Links to video)	Interviewee(s)	Interviewer(s)	Book	Topic of interview / Comments
January 2, 2010	Gail Collins	Gwen Ifill	When Everything Changed: The Amazing Journey of American Women from 1960 to the Present	
January 9, 2010	David Wessel	Alice Rivlin	In Fed We Trust: Ben Bernanke's War on the Great Panic	Ben Bernanke, 2008 financial crisis
January 16, 2010	Peniel Joseph	Kevin Merida	Dark Days, Bright Nights: From Black Power to Barack Obama	
January 23, 2010	Thomas Fleming	Barbara Mitnick	The Intimate Lives of the Founding Fathers	Founding Fathers of the United States
January 30, 2010	John Yoo	Victoria Toensing	Crisis and Command	
February 6, 2010	Joseph Stiglitz	Lori Wallach	Freefall	2008 financial crisis
February 13, 2010	Garry Wills	Tom Blanton	Bomb Power	
February 20, 2010	Ken Gormley	Greg Craig	The Death of American Virtue: Clinton v. Starr	Impeachment of Bill Clinton
February 27, 2010	George Packer	Christopher Hitchens	Facing Unpleasant Facts and All Art Is Propaganda	George Orwell
March 13, 2010	Bill and Janet Cohen	John Lewis	Race & Reconciliation	
March 21, 2010	Diane Ravitch	Valerie Strauss	The Death and Life of the Great American School System	
March 27, 2010	Bill Bennett	Walter Isaacson	A Century Turns	
April 3, 2010	Jack Matlock	Dimitri Simes	Superpower Illusions: How Myths and False Ideologies Led America Astray - and How to Return to Reality	
April 10, 2010	Deborah Amos	Mohamad Bazzi	Eclipse of the Sunnis	Sunni Islam
April 17, 2010	Harry Markopolos	Nicole Gelinas	No One Would Listen	Madoff investment scandal
April 24, 2010	Mark Perry	Larry Johnson	Talking to Terrorists	
May 1, 2010	Elaine Tyler	Christina Hoff Sommers	America and the Pill: A History of Promise, Peril, and Liberation	The birth control pill, Margaret Sanger, Katharine McCormick
May 8, 2010	Piper Kerman	Ted Conover	Orange is the New Black: My Year in a Women's Prison	
May 15, 2010	John Kiriakou	Frederick Hitz	The Reluctant Spy	
May 22, 2010	Michael Graham	Jonathan Karl	That's No Angry Mob, That's My Mom	The Tea Party movement
May 29, 2010	Sebastian Junger	Paul Rieckhoff	War	173rd Airborne Brigade Combat Team in Afghanistan, 2007-2008
May 31, 2010	Mitt Romney	Juan Williams	No Apology: The Case for American Greatness	
June 5, 2010	Stephen Prothero	Sally Quinn	God is Not One	Conceptions of God
June 13, 2010	Gary Rivlin	Heather Mac Donald	Broke USA	
June 26, 2010	Jere Van Dyk	George Packer	Captive: My Time As A Prisoner of the Taliban	
July 10, 2010	Andrew Napolitano	Ralph Nader	Lies the Government Told You	
July 11, 2010	Arthur Brooks and Strobe Talbott		The Battle: How the Fight between Free Enterprise and Big Government Will Shape America's Future (by Brooks) and Fast Forward: Ethics and Politics in the Age of Global Warming (by Talbott)	Brooks and Talbott interviewed each other about the other's book.
July 17, 2010	Alan Brinkley	Sam Tanenhaus	The Publisher: Henry Luce and His American Century	Henry Luce
July 24, 2010	Ayaan Hirsi Ali	Paula Dobriansky	Nomad	
July 31, 2010	Carl Cannon	Paul Clement	Circle of Greed	William Lerach
August 7, 2010	Richard Whittle	John Pike	The Dream Machine	V-22 Osprey
August 14, 2010	Peter Beinart	Mike Allen	The Icarus Syndrome	
August 21, 2010	Michael Belfiore	Joanne Carney	The Department of Mad Scientists: How DARPA Is Remaking Our World, from the Internet to Artificial Limbs	DARPA
August 28, 2010	Sebastian Mallaby	Gillian Tett	More Money Than God: Hedge Funds and the Making of a New Elite	Hedge funds
September 4, 2010	David Kilcullen	Lawrence Wilkerson	Counterinsurgency	Counterinsurgency
September 11, 2010	Arianna Huffington	Maria Bartiromo	Third World America: How Our Politicians Are Abandoning the Middle Class and Betraying the American Dream	
September 18, 2010	Gabriel Schoenfeld	Michael Mukasey	Necessary Secrets: National Security, the Media, and the Rule of Law	
September 27, 2010	Louise Knight	Dan Moshenberg	Jane Addams: Spirit in Action	Jane Addams
October 3, 2010	James Swanson	Edna Greene Medford	Bloody Crimes	Jefferson Davis, Funeral and burial of Abraham Lincoln
October 9, 2010	Hooman Majd	Hamid Dabashi	The Ayatollah's Democracy	Politics of Iran
October 16, 2010	Maria Bartiromo	Yves Smith	The Weekend That Changed Wall Street	
October 23, 2010	Dinesh D'Souza	Jonathan Alter	The Roots of Obama's Rage	
November 1, 2010	Scott Rasmussen and Doug Schoen	Amity Shlaes	Mad as Hell	Tea Party movement
November 14, 2010	Nigel Hamilton	Richard Norton Smith	American Caesars	
November 20, 2010	John Dower	Sanho Tree	Cultures of War	
November 21, 2010	Ron Christie	Janet Langhart Cohen	Acting White	
November 28, 2010	James Zogby	Barbara Slavin	Arab Voices: What They Are Saying to Us and Why it Matters	
December 11, 2010	Noah Feldman	Dahlia Lithwick	Scorpions: The Battles and Triumphs of FDR's Great Supreme Court Justices	Felix Frankfurter, Hugo Black, Robert Jackson, William O. Douglas
December 12, 2010	Jimmy Carter	Doug Brinkley	White House Diary	
December 18, 2010	Hugh Shelton	William Cohen	Without Hesitation: The Odyssey of an American Warrior	
December 27, 2010	Jane Smiley	Cecilia Kang	The Man Who Invented the Computer	John Vincent Atanasoff
