= Stelios Kouloglou =

Greek writer and politician (born 1953)

Stelios Kouloglou MEP
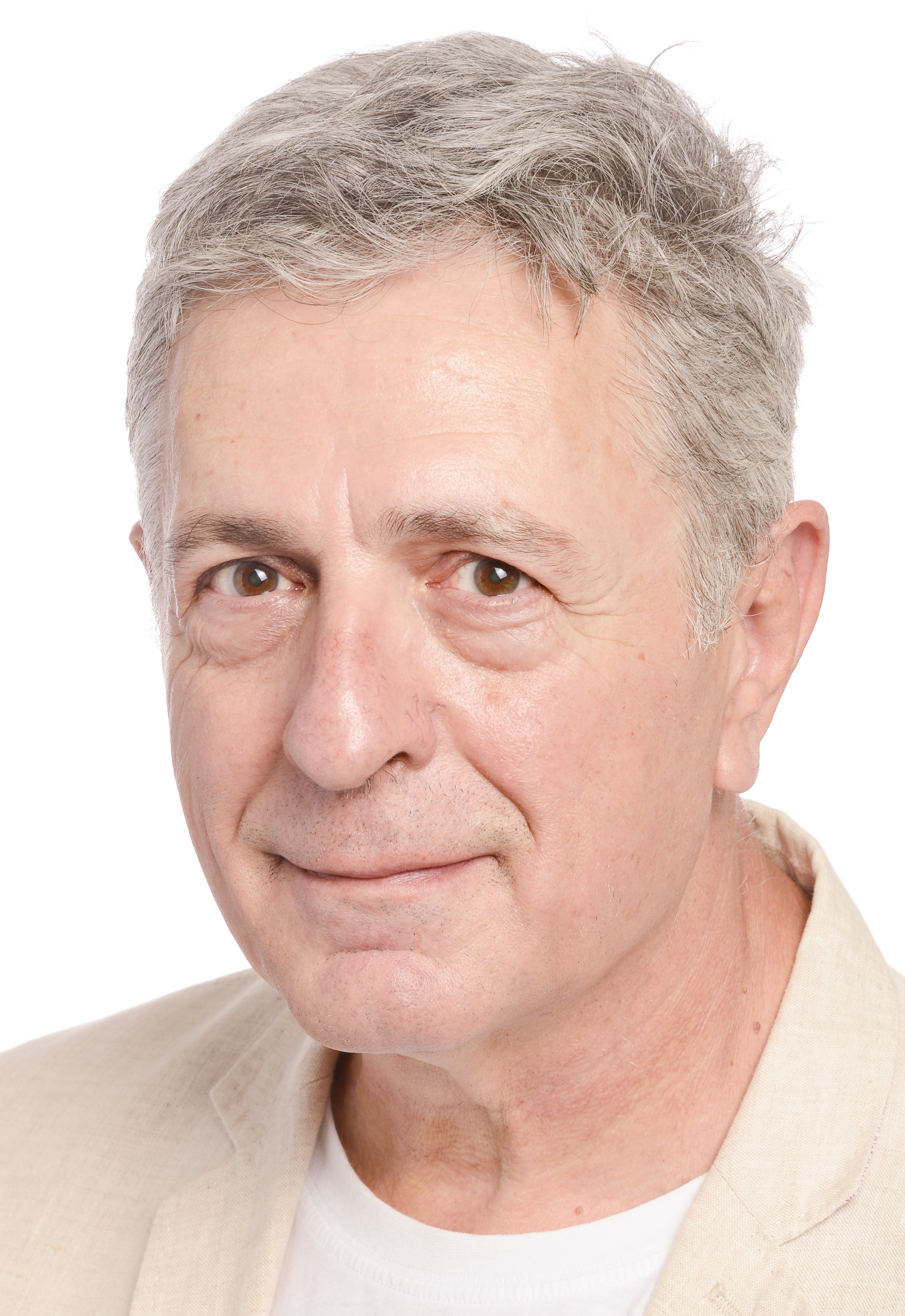

Member of the European Parliament for Greece
- In office 1 July 2014 – 16 July 2024

Personal details
- Born: 27 February 1953 (age 73) Athens, Greece
- Party: New Left (2023–present)
- Other political affiliations: Syriza (2015–2023)

Stelios Kouloglou (Greek: Στέλιος Κούλογλου; born 27 February 1953) is a Greek journalist, writer, and documentary director. He is the creator of the news web channel "TVXS". He is also a political analyst and major Greek publications columnist in international press including Le Monde Diplomatique.

In early 2015, Kouloglou was designated a member of the European Parliament on behalf of Syriza, after Georgios Katrougalos joined the Tsipras cabinet. On 23 October 2023, he announced his departure from the Syriza parliamentary group amidst a rift with newly elected party leader Stefanos Kasselakis.

== Biography ==
He was born in Athens. He graduated from the University of Athens and studied journalism in Paris, Tokyo and India. He has worked as a political correspondent in Greece and as a foreign correspondent in Paris and Moscow, from where he covered developments in the Soviet Union and the other ex-communist countries. In the 1992-95 period he covered the war in Yugoslavia as a special war correspondent.

In 1996 Kouloglou created and introduced for the Greek national television Reportage Without Frontiers a weekly current affairs and documentaries program awarded 4 times as the best informative program of the Greek television. His documentaries have won awards in Greece and abroad. Best Greek documentary award for his series of programs on the Greek civil war(2000), Eurocomenius award for the film “The Death Match”(2002).

On 12 May 2008 the administration of ERT decided not to renew the cooperation with the journalist. As justification, they said that the broadcast had run its course and that its cost was disproportionally high. According to Kouloglou, the ERT administration had requested the cancellation of the broadcasting of his documentary show titled "Generation of 700 €", while they also refused to cooperate in the organization of a documentary on human rights in China from Mao to the Olympic Games. The termination of his cooperation with ERT was portrayed as "censorship" by politically friendly to the journalist media and a few like-minded deputies in the parliament.

On 1 November 2008 he founded the internet channel named "TV Without Frontiers", a news and political analysis website.

In 2009, his documentary film Confessions of an Economic Hit Man, based on the book of the same name by John Perkins, was shown at film festivals in the U.S. and received awards in South Korea and Spain.

On 28 January 2010, as compensation to the " censorship" imposed on him, he returned to the Hellenic Broadcasting Corporation's (ERT) as a member of the Board appointed by the new government. However, in June 2010, he resigned from the Board of ERT and in September 2010 he restores the broadcasting of the program Reportage without Frontiers until the closing of ERT by the government of Antonis Samaras.

He has written books on current affairs and politics (Sta ihni tou Tritou Dromou, 1986 (On the footsteps of the "Third Road"), Mia fora ki enan kairo itan mia Sovietiki Enwsi, 1994 (Once upon a time there was a Soviet Union), Oi kokkinoi ksanarhontai, 1994 (The return of the Reds)), historical testimonies (Martyries gia ton Emfylio kai tin Elliniki Aristera, 2005 (Testimonies on the Civil War and the Greek Left)) and Min pas pote monos sto tahydromeio, 2002 (Never go to the post office alone)), top best seller for years 2002-3. He was awarded "writer of the year 2002" for this book.

He is producer and director of numerous grand reportages and documentaries for ARTE, ERT, including «Whistleblowers»(2004). Among his documentaries stands out "Oligarchy" (2012) a documentary on the world financial crisis filmed in the US, Germany, Belgium, Great Britain, Spain, Portugal, Ecuador and Greece. «Holocaust of Memory»(2013), is a documentary about personal testimonies on unreported nazi crimes in Greece. His documentary titled "The godmother" (2014) focuses on Angela Merkel and accuses her of a strategy to impose German hegemony in Europe. His latest documentary "Escape from Amorgos" (2015) is a story about the exiled politician Giorgos Mylonas and true face of the military dictatorship in Greece.

He has been described by the international media watchdog «Reporters without Borders» as «long the symbol of investigative journalism» in Greece.

In 2026, The Citizen Lab reported that Kouloglou had been hacked with the Pegasus spyware during his time serving in the PEGA Committee of the European Parliament.
