= Confessions of an Economic Hit Man =

Book by John Perkins

- Author: John Perkins
- Language: English
- Publisher: Berrett-Koehler Publishers
- Publication date: 2004
- Pages: 250
- ISBN: 0-452-28708-1
- OCLC: 55138900

Confessions of an Economic Hit Man is a semi-autobiographical book written by American essayist John Perkins, first published in 2004.

The book provides Perkins' account of his career with engineering consulting firm Chas. T. Main in Boston. Perkins states that the NSA arranged for him to be hired by the firm, and that he was subsequently seduced and trained as an "economic hitman" by a businesswoman named Claudine Martin, who worked for Chas. T. Main. Perkins writes that his primary role at Chas T. Main was to convince leaders of underdeveloped countries to accept substantial development loans for large construction and engineering projects, thus trapping them in a system of American influence and control.

The book was a commercial success, appearing on the best-seller lists of both the New York Times and Amazon. Critics expressed doubts about the accuracy and validity of claims Perkins made in the book. Perkins was referred to as a conspiracy theorist by one reviewer, while a number of former colleagues at Chas T. Main disputed or disagreed with some of his allegations. Several reviewers discussed a lack of documentation or verification for Perkins' claims.

== Content ==
The book provides Perkins' account of his career with engineering consulting firm Chas. T. Main in Boston. Perkins states that the National Security Agency (NSA), with whom he had interviewed for a job prior to joining Main, was involved in his recruitment. According to Perkins, this interview effectively constituted an independent screening that led to his subsequent hiring as an 'economic hit man' by Einar Greve, vice president of the firm (and alleged NSA liaison). Perkins says that he was seduced and trained as an "economic hitman" by a Chas. T. Main businesswoman named Claudine Martin, who used his NSA personality profile to manipulate and control him.

According to Perkins, his job at the firm was to convince leaders of underdeveloped countries to accept substantial development loans for large construction and engineering projects. Ensuring that these projects were contracted to U.S. companies, such loans provided political influence for the US and access to natural resources for American companies, thus primarily helping local elites and wealthy families, rather than the poor.

The book heavily criticizes U.S. foreign policy and the notion that "all economic growth benefits humankind, and that the greater the growth, the more widespread the benefits." Perkins states that, in many cases, only a small portion of the population benefits at the expense of the rest, pointing to, as an example, an increase in income inequality, whereby large U.S. corporations exploit cheap labor, and oil companies destroy local environments.

Perkins describes what he calls a system of corporatocracy and greed as the driving forces behind establishing the United States as a global empire, in which he took a role as an "economic hit man" to expand its influence. In this capacity, Perkins recounts his meetings with some prominent individuals, including Graham Greene and Omar Torrijos. Perkins describes the role of an economic hit man as follows:

Economic hit men (EHMs) are highly paid professionals who cheat countries around the globe out of trillions of dollars. They funnel money from the World Bank, the U.S. Agency for International Development (USAID), and other foreign "aid" organizations into the coffers of huge corporations and the pockets of a few wealthy families who control the planet's natural resources. Their tools included fraudulent financial reports, rigged elections, payoffs, extortion, sex, and murder. They play a game as old as empire, but one that has taken on new and terrifying dimensions during this time of globalization.

== Reception ==
The book did well in terms of sales, placing on the best-seller lists of both the New York Times and Amazon. The New York Times wrote that Perkins' book followed "a rich literary tradition, spanning more than 80 years, of corporate insiders writing books in a confessional vein that puncture the secretive, less seemly aspects of their professions".

Columnist Sebastian Mallaby of The Washington Post wrote "This man is a frothing conspiracy theorist, a vainglorious peddler of nonsense, and yet his book, Confessions of an Economic Hit Man, is a runaway bestseller." Mallaby said that Perkins' conception of international finance is "largely a dream" and that his "basic contentions are flat wrong" because "the poor don't always lose" when developing countries borrow money. Mallaby wrote that Indonesia reduced its infant mortality and illiteracy rates by two-thirds after economists persuaded its leaders to borrow money in 1970. He also disagrees with Perkins' statement that 51 of the top 100 world economies belong to companies.

A press release issued by the U.S Department of State (DOS), said there was a lack of documentary or testimonial evidence to corroborate Perkins's statement that the NSA was involved in his hiring by Chas T. Main. The DOS release stated that the NSA "is a cryptological (codemaking and codebreaking) organization, not an economic organization" and that its missions do not involve "anything remotely resembling placing economists at private companies in order to increase the debt of foreign countries."

Economic historian Niall Ferguson discusses some of Perkins's statements in the 2008 book The Ascent of Money (2008). According to Perkins, the leaders of Ecuador (President Jaime Roldós Aguilera) and Panama (General Omar Torrijos) were assassinated by US agents for opposing the interests of the owners of their countries' foreign debt. Both men died in airplane crashes in 1981. According to Ferguson, Perkins's allegations "seems a little odd." Ferguson wrote that, in the 1970s, the amount of money that the US had lent to Ecuador and Panama accounted for less than 0.4% of the total U.S. grants and loans, while in 1990, exports from the US to those countries accounted for approximately 0.4% of total U.S. exports (approx. US$8 billion). Ferguson contends those "do not seem like figures worth killing for."

Boston Magazine wrote that, when asked for evidence for his statements, Perkins produced a "flimsy package of materials", including an article related to Chas. T. Main's former vice president, Einar Greve. Greve, who first offered Perkins a job at the firm, agreed that foreign debt represented a poor economic strategy for developing nations:

Basically his story is true.… What John's book says is, there was a conspiracy to put all these countries on the hook, and that happened. Whether or not it was some sinister plot or not is up to interpretation, but many of these countries are still over the barrel and have never been able to repay the loans.

Greve said that he knew no one from the NSA and that Perkins "has convinced himself that a lot of this stuff is true". Frank Fullerton, one of Perkins' supervisors at Chas T. Main, said that Perkins left because he "thought he was worth more than he was."

== Other works ==
Perkins continued with writing four other books on the 'economic hit man' topic, focusing on other aspects:

- A Game as Old as Empire: the Secret World of Economic Hit Men and the Web of Global Corruption (2007);
- The Secret History of the American Empire: The Truth About Economic Hit Men, Jackals, and How to Change the World (2007);
- Hoodwinked: An Economic Hit Man Reveals Why the World Financial Markets Imploded – and What We Need to Do to Remake Them (2009); and
- The New Confessions of an Economic Hit Man (2016).

=== Documentary film ===
In 2009, Stelios Kouloglou directed a Greek–U.S. co-produced documentary titled Confessions of an Economic Hit Man, featuring interviews with Perkins filmed between 2007 and 2008. The film was shown at movie festivals around the United States.

== See also ==
- The Shock Doctrine
- American Century
- War Is a Racket
