= The World's Banker =

2004 financial biography by Sebastian Mallaby

- Author: Sebastian Mallaby
- Language: English
- Subject: Economic development, Finance, Foreign Policy , World Bank, International finance
- Publisher: Penguin Press
- Publication date: 2004
- Media type: Print: hardback
- Pages: 432
- ISBN: 1594200238
- Preceded by: After Apartheid (1992)
- Followed by: More Money Than God: Hedge Funds and the Making of a New Elite (2010)

Sebastian Mallaby's The World's Banker: A Story of Failed States, Financial Crises, and the Wealth and Poverty of Nations (2004) (The World's Banker) is a financial biography book. British journalist Mallaby is a highly ranked member of the Council on Foreign Relations, working in international economics.

== Summary ==
Mallaby follows a formula in his books, using each chapter to focus on a different geographic concern related to the world bank during the tenure of J.D. Wolfensohn.

- Preface: The Prisoner of Lilliput
- Chapter One: A Tale of Two Ambitions - concerns the outlook of U.S. president after the attacks.
- Chapter Two: “World Bank Murderer”
- Chapter Three:The Renaissance President
- Chapter Four: A Twister in Africa
- Chapter Five: Mission Sarajevo
- Chapter Six: Narcissus and the Octopus
- Chapter Seven: The Cancer of Corruption
- Chapter Eight: Uganda's Myth and Miracle
- Chapter Nine: A Framework for Development
- Chapter Ten: From Seattle to Tibet
- Chapter Eleven: Waking Up to Terror
- Chapter Twelve: A Plague upon Development
- Chapter Thirteen: Back to the Future
- Chapter Fourteen: A Lion at Carnegie
- Afterword: regarding the appointment of successor Paul Wolfowitz

== Reception ==
"Mallaby gives us a sophisticated, evenhanded take on the bank's last decade of development efforts."

"Mallaby, a Washington Post editorial writer, provides a sympathetic yet critical assessment of the World Bank under Wolfensohn's leadership, crediting him for bringing the bank much closer to its developing-country clients but faulting him for trying to take on too wide a scope of activity without a clear and manageable set of priorities."

== Editions ==
- The World's Banker: A Story of Failed States, Financial Crises, and the Wealth and Poverty of Nations. Penguin Press, October, 2004. Hardcover USA. ISBN 1594200238 1st ed. pages: 432.
- The World's Banker: A Story of Failed States, Financial Crises, and the Wealth and Poverty of Nations. Penguin Press, October 2004. Paperback. ISBN 978-0-300-11676-2 1st ed. pages: 432.
- The World's Banker: A Story of Failed States, Financial Crises, and the Wealth and Poverty of Nations. Penguin Press, April 25, 2006. Hardcover USA. ISBN 978-0143036791 2nd ed. pages: 496.

This edition features a new afterword by the author that analyzes the appointment of Paul Wolfowitz as Wolfensohn's successor at the World bank.

- Kindle other electronic book editions.
- Audiobook edition by Audible Audio.

== See also ==
- "James David Wolfensohn". World Bank. Archived from the original on 12 November 2020. Retrieved 26 November
- World Bank biography; retrieved 7 May 2008
