= Belfiore (surname) =

Belfiore is a surname. Notable people with the surname include:

- Ivan Belfiore (born 1960), Canadian soccer player
- Joe Belfiore (born c.1968), executive at Microsoft
- Michael Belfiore, American author and journalist
- Mike Belfiore (born 1988), American baseball pitcher
