= Alfred Winslow Jones =

American investor, hedge fund manager and sociologist

- Born: 9 September 1900; Melbourne, Australia
- Died: 2 June 1989 (aged 88); Redding, Connecticut, U.S.
- Education: Harvard University (BA); Columbia University (PhD)
- Occupations: Investor, hedge fund manager, and sociologist
- Known for: Founding of first modern hedge fund
- Spouses: Anna Luise Hauser née Block; Mary Carter
- Children: Anthony Winslow Jones; Dale Burch

Alfred Winslow Jones (9 September 1900 – 2 June 1989) was an American investor, hedge fund manager, and sociologist. He is credited with forming the first modern hedge fund and is widely regarded as the "father of the hedge fund industry."

== Early life and education ==
Jones was born in Melbourne, Australia, the son of Arthur Winslow Jones (an executive of General Electric) and his wife, Elizabeth Huntington. He moved to the United States with his family when he was 4, growing up in Schenectady, New York. He graduated from Harvard University in 1923, and, after working as purser on a tramp steamer that sailed around the world, he joined the Foreign Service. In the early 1930s, he became vice consul at the U.S. embassy in Berlin during Hitler's rise to power. In 1932, for just under a year he was married to Anna Luise Hauser, née Block (1896–1982), a daughter of the German painter Joseph Block and a descendant of German banker Joseph Mendelssohn. In 1936, he married Mary Carter, with whom he travelled through Spain during that country's civil war, reporting on civilian relief for the Quakers. In 1941, he earned a doctorate in sociology at Columbia University. He then completed his doctoral thesis, Life, Liberty and Property, a survey of attitudes toward property in Akron, Ohio.

Sebastian Mallaby dedicated a chapter in his 2010 book entitled More Money Than God: Hedge Funds and the Making of a New Elite, in which he describes Jones as "an erudite dandy, a onetime Marxist who hiked to the frontlines of the Spanish Civil War with the writer Dorothy Parker—where they shared a bottle of Scotch whisky with Ernest Hemingway."

== Academic career ==
During the 1940s Jones worked for Fortune magazine and wrote articles on non-financial subjects such as Atlantic convoys, farm cooperatives, and boys' prep schools. In March 1949, Jones was investigating technical methods of market analysis for an article titled "Fashions in Forecasting", reporting on a new class of stock-market timers and the approaches they employed to call the market. He studied a dozen or so of these "technicians", whose approaches ranged from volume/price ratios to odd-lot statistics to the outcome of the Harvard–Yale football game.

In "Fashions," Jones assessed each approach, sometimes harshly and other times positively. For example, Jones commented on one analysis that "…the market trend succeeded itself 62.5 times out of a hundred and reversed itself 37.5 times. The probability of obtaining such a result in a penny tossing series is infinitesimal." Jones was looking for approaches that offered better than a 'fair game.' He noted that certain approaches require trending markets, others work in higher volatility environments, still others in improving credit markets. He was beginning to feel his way down a dimly lit path toward what today would be considered a factor-based approach to portfolio construction.

Jones's comments on Nicholas Molodovsky's work showed he thought highly of it. In one passage on Molodovsky he said, "Well controlled experimental work of this nature is important and likely to become more accurate as the methods are further developed." He hinted at the approach of risk-weighting individual stocks, as well as quantifying how far a stock has diverged from its fundamental value.

The research gave him the idea to try his own hand at investing. Two months before the Fortune article went to press, Jones had established an investment partnership, A.W. Jones & Co., that would exploit this new style of investing. He raised a total of $100,000, $40,000 of which was his own. In its first year the partnership's gain on its capital came to a very respectable 17.3 percent.

== The "hedge fund" ==
Jones is credited with coining the phrase "hedged fund" and is credited with creating the first hedge fund structure in 1949. Jones referred to his fund as being "hedged", a term then commonly used on Wall Street to describe the management of investment risk due to changes in the financial markets.

Jones combined two speculative tools to create what he considered a conservative investment scheme. He used leverage to buy more shares, and used short selling to avoid market risk. He bought as many stocks as he sold, so market-wide moves up or down would be neutralized in the portfolio. The value of the portfolio, then, would not be based on direction of the market but whether the manager had picked the right stocks to buy and sell. The fund avoided requirements of the Investment Company Act of 1940 by limiting itself to 99 investors in a limited partnership. Jones chose to take 20 percent of profits as compensation, invoking the Phoenician sea captains who kept a fifth of the profits from successful voyages. Initially, he charged no fee unless he made a profit. Jones later added a 2% management fee on all assets, regardless of the performance of the fund. These elements: a partnership structure where a percentage of profits is paid as compensation to the general partner/fund manager, a small number of limited partners as investors, and a variety of long and short positions, are the core elements of hedge funds today. Jones' fee system of a 2% management fee and a 20% fee on gains was also widely adopted by hedge funds and became popularly known as the 2-and-20 model.

While a few investors, including Warren Buffett and Barton Biggs, adopted the structure that he created, Jones and his structure were not widely known until 1966. That year Carol Loomis wrote an article called "The Jones Nobody Keeps Up With." Published in Fortune, Loomis' article lionized Jones and his approach. The article's opening line summarizes the results at A.W. Jones & Co.: "There are reasons to believe that the best professional money manager of investors' money these days is a quiet-spoken seldom photographed man named Alfred Winslow Jones." Coining the term 'hedge fund' to describe Jones' fund, it pointed out that his hedge fund had outperformed the best mutual fund over the previous five years by 44 percent, despite its management-incentive fee. On a 10-year basis, Mr. Jones's hedge fund had beaten the top performer Dreyfus Fund by 87 percent. This led to a flurry of interest in hedge funds and within the next three years at least 130 hedge funds were started, including George Soros's Quantum Fund and Michael Steinhardt's Steinhardt Partners.

Alfred Jones's investors lost money in only 3 of his 34 years. By contrast, the S&P500 had 9 down years during a similar period. Jones's worst year was the fiscal year that ended on 31 May 1970, when he lost 35.3% (the S&P lost 23.4% over the same period). Alex Porter, one of Jones's portfolio managers, confirmed that their market exposure was aggressive, perhaps up to 120%. By contrast, Jones did relatively well during the market downturn of 1973–1974 by being conservative.

In 1984, Jones transformed his fund into a fund of funds, investing its capital in other hedge funds with different areas of expertise and investment styles. He gradually disengaged himself from his office and gave his time to the Peace Corps and even tried to establish a "reverse Peace Corps" in which aid recipients would send their own volunteers back to the United States to work with the poor in that country, as a "hedge" against creating a culture of inferiority among developing countries.

== Legacy and awards ==
In 2008, he was inducted into Institutional Investors Alpha's Hedge Fund Manager Hall of Fame along with Bruce Kovner, David Swensen, and others.

== See also ==
- List of Harvard University people
- List of Columbia University people

== Sources ==
- John Russell, Alfred W. Jones, 88, Sociologist And Investment Fund Innovator. NY Times 3 June 1989: Section 1, Page 11
- Hugo Lindgren, Long-Short Story Short. NY Magazine 16 April 2007
- David A. Vaughan, Comments for the U.S. Securities and Exchange Commission Roundtable on Hedge Funds. 14–15 May 2003
- A.W. Jones, History of the Firm
- Sharon Reier, From Jones to LTCM: A Short (-Selling) History, International Herald-Tribune 2 December 2000
- David Skeel, Behind the Hedge. Legal Affairs, November/December 2005
- Alan Rappeport, A Short History of Hedge Funds. CFO Magazine 27 March 2007
- Michael Litt, Prudence: Paradigm Shift in Pension & Wealth Management. AEI POLICY SERIES, May 15, 2006
- "Learning to Love Hedge Funds; Hedge funds have been reviled as slick opportunists that fanned the flames of the collapse. Yet Sebastian Mallaby argues that they hold the key to a more stable financial system," Sebastian Mallaby, Wall Street Journal, June 11, 2010

== Extended bibliography ==
- Alfred Winslow Jones, Life, Liberty, and Property, A Story of Conflict and a Measurement of Conflicting Rights, 'The University of Akron Press
- Roger Lowenstein, When Genius Failed (2000)
- Scott J. Lederman, 'Hedge Funds', in Financial Product Fundamentals: A Guide for Lawyers, 11–3, 11–4, 11-5 (Clifford E. Kirsch ed., 2000);
- Brown, Heidi and John H. Christy. "Growing Pains." Forbes 11 June 2001: 74–77.
- Jones, Alfred Winslow. "Fashions in Forecasting." Fortune March 1949: 88–91, 180, 182, 184, 186.
- Landau, Peter. "Alfred Winslow Jones: The Long and the Short of the Founding Father." Institutional Investor August 1968:
- Landau, Peter. "The Hedge Funds: Wall Street's New Way to Make Money." New York Magazine 21 October 1968: pp. 20–24.
- Lindgren, Hugo. "Long-Short Story Short: The Creation Myth." New York Magazine 16 April 2007
- Loomis, Carol J. "The Jones Nobody Keeps Up With." Fortune April 1966: 237, 240, 242, 247.
- Loomis, Carol J. "Hard Times Come to Hedge Funds." Fortune June 1970: 100–103, 136–140.
- "Missing 'd.'" Grant's Interest Rate Observer 9 October 1998: 1–2.
- Scholl, Jaye. "Back to the Future." Barron's 31 July 2000: 32.
- Strachman, Daniel A. Getting Started in Hedge Funds. New York: Wiley, 2000.
- Strauss, Lawrence C., "The Legacy." Barrons 31 May 2004
