= Zanny Minton Beddoes =

British journalist (born 1967)

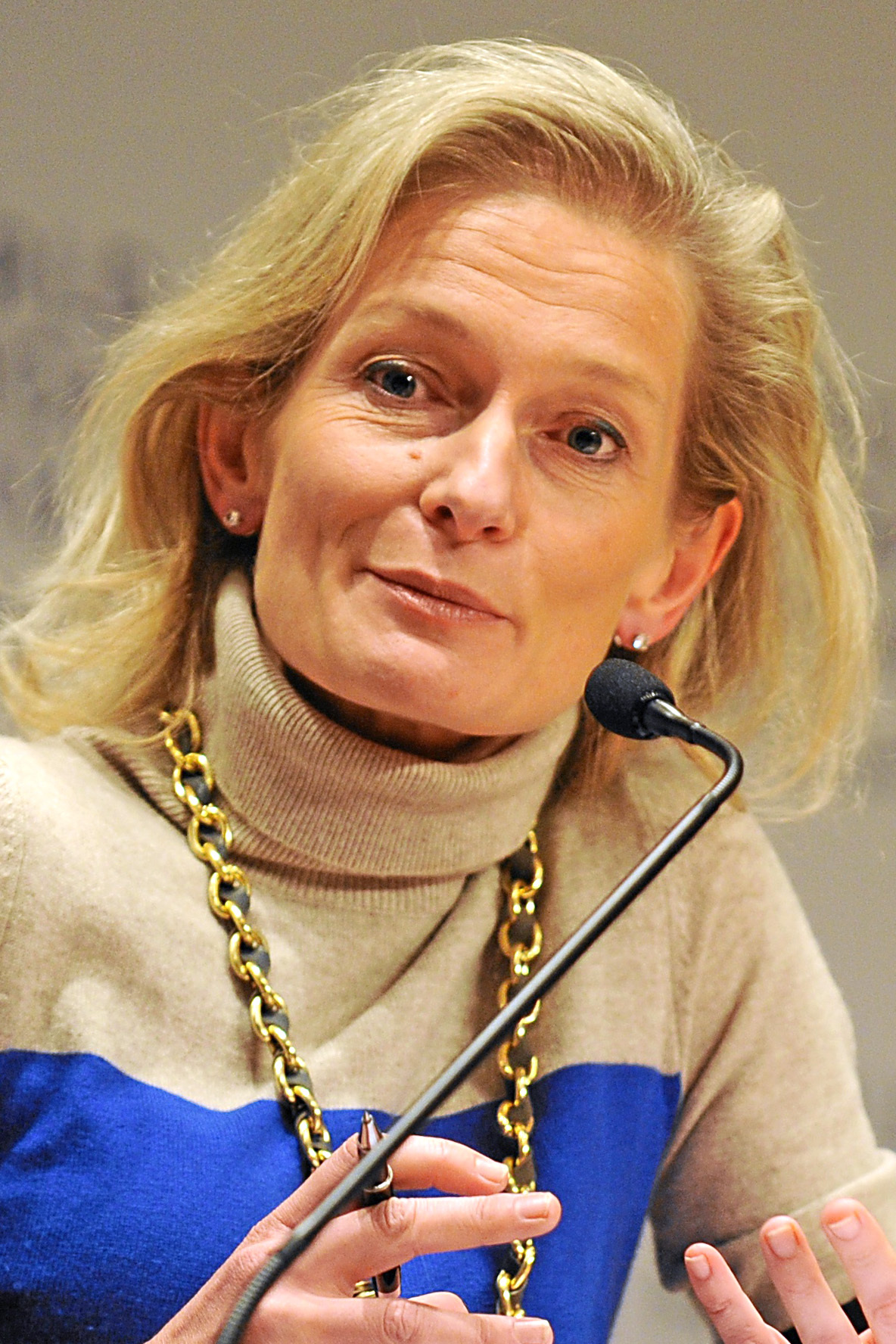
- Minton Beddoes at the World Economic Forum Annual Meeting in 2013
- Born: July 1967 (age 59); Shropshire, England
- Education: St Hilda's College, Oxford (BA); Harvard University (MPA)
- Occupation: Editor-in-chief of The Economist
- Spouse: Sebastian Mallaby
- Children: 4
- Awards: Gerald Loeb Award (2012 and 2017)

Susan "Zanny" Minton Beddoes (born July 1967) is a British journalist. She is the editor-in-chief of The Economist. She began working for the newspaper in 1994 as its emerging markets correspondent.

On February 2, 2015, she became editor-in-chief of The Economist, and the first woman to hold the position. She is also a member of the board of directors of The Economist Group.

== Education and early life ==
Minton Beddoes was born in Shropshire, the eldest daughter of a former British army officer and his German-born wife.

Minton Beddoes was educated at Moreton Hall School near Oswestry, and received a Bachelor of Arts degree at the University of Oxford, where she studied philosophy, politics and economics (PPE) as an undergraduate student of St Hilda's College, Oxford. She earned a master's degree at the Kennedy School of Harvard University as a Kennedy Scholar from 1989 to 1990, and had the scholarship fully renewed for an additional year.

== Career ==
After graduation, she was recruited as an adviser to the minister of finance in Poland, in 1992, as part of a small group headed by Professor Jeffrey Sachs of Harvard. She then spent two years as an economist at the International Monetary Fund (IMF), where she worked on macroeconomic adjustment programmes in Africa and the transition economies of Central and Eastern Europe.

Through this work, she joined The Economist in 1994 as the newspaper's correspondent for emerging markets, based in London. She became the economics editor in 1996, overseeing global economics coverage from Washington DC, and later moved to business affairs editor, responsible for business, finance and science. She began as the 17th editor-in-chief on 2 February 2015, the first woman to hold the position.

Secured by her appointment to the top editor position at The Economist, Minton Beddoes was described by the 2015 edition of Debrett's 500 as "one of the most influential voices in financial journalism". She has written surveys of the world economy, Latin American finance, global finance and Central Asia. She has written extensively about the American economy and international financial policy; the enlargement of the European Union; the future of the IMF; and economic reform in emerging economies. She has been published in Foreign Affairs and Foreign Policy, contributed chapters to several conference volumes, and edited Emerging Asia (Asian Development Bank, 1997), a book on the future of emerging-markets in Asia.

In May 1998, she provided expert testimony on the introduction of the euro to the United States House Financial Services Subcommittee on International Monetary Policy and Trade, a subcommittee of the House Committee on Financial Services.

In 2010, Minton Beddoes spoke at Princeton University with Peter Orszag, Director of the Office of Management and Budget, and Professor Alan Blinder, Chair of the Center for Economic Policy Studies at Princeton. Their discussion was called "How Did We Get Into this Mortgage Mess, and How Do We Get Out?" In 2012, she gave the 28th Annual Max Rosenn Lecture on "Stress-Testing America's Prosperity". Minton Beddoes is a regular commentator on Marketplace and other public radio programmes. She has also appeared on CNN, the BBC World Service, Charlie Rose, PBS NewsHour, CNBC, NBC and Real Time with Bill Maher.

She is a trustee of the Carnegie Endowment for International Peace and a member of the Research Advisory Board of the Committee for Economic Development.

In 2015, Minton Beddoes was one of 133 invitees to the 63rd Bilderberg conference, an invitation-only meeting of top business leaders, politicians, academics and royalty, for an informal and secret discussion of world issues.

=== Awards ===
- 2012 Gerald Loeb Award for Commentary
- 2017 Gerald Loeb Award for Breaking News

== Personal life ==
She is married to English journalist and author Sebastian Mallaby. They have four children.

Media offices
Preceded by John Micklethwait	Editor of The Economist; 2015–present	Succeeded by Incumbent
