= Charles T. Main =

American mechanical engineer and business executive

Charles Thomas Main
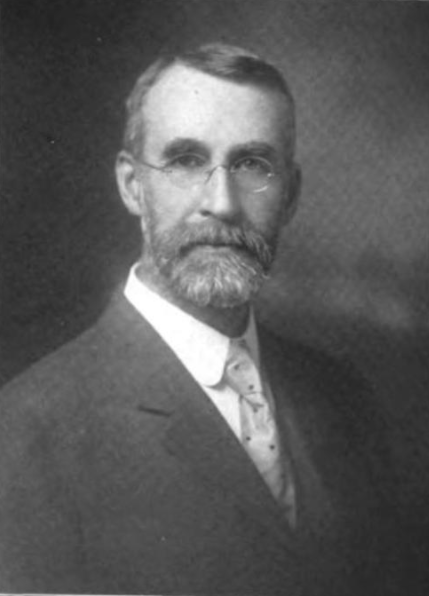
- Born: February 16, 1856; Marblehead, Massachusetts, U.S.
- Died: March 6, 1943 (aged 87); Winchester, Massachusetts, U.S.
- Education: Massachusetts Institute of Technology (BS, 1876)
- Occupations: Engineer, businessman
- Spouse: Elizabeth F. Appleton (m. 1883)
- Awards: ASME Medal (1935); ASME Honorary member (1939)

Charles Thomas Main (February 16, 1856 – March 6, 1943) was an American mechanical engineer and business executive, who worked for New England textile mills, and also in the then new field of hydroelectricity. He is known as founder of Charles T. Main, Inc., and as president of the American Society of Mechanical Engineers in the year 1918-19.

== Biography ==
Charles Thomas Main was born in Marblehead, Massachusetts on February 16, 1856, the son of Thomas and Cordelia (Reed) Main. His grandmother, Deborah Phillips, was a descendant of Rev. George Phillips who settled Watertown, Massachusetts in 1630. Main's father was a machinist and engineer, and this may account in part for Charles' early displayed fondness for scientific subjects and general work in mathematics. He obtained his preliminary education in the schools of Marblehead, and later entered the Massachusetts Institute of Technology, then of Boston, Massachusetts, where he was graduated B.S. in 1876. Following his graduation, he spent three years (1876–79) as assistant in the laboratories of the institute, perfecting himself in the practical work of his profession.

In October 1879, in order to still further improve both his technical and practical knowledge, he became a draftsman in the extensive plant of the Manchester Mills, at Manchester, New Hampshire, remaining there until June 1, 1881, when he began work as engineer in the Lower Pacific Mills at Lawrence, Massachusetts. In this capacity he served until 1885, when his abilities won him promotion to the position of assistant superintendent of the mills. In 1886, he was made superintendent, and so continued until January 1, 1892, when he resigned to enter upon general engineering practice.

He worked a year in Providence, Rhode Island, and then entered a partnership with power engineer Francis Winthrop Dean. He started his own firm in 1907 which was incorporated as the engineering company Charles T. Main, Inc., in 1926. Main became identified as engineer and designer with some of the most important industrial construction work in the eastern United States, and designed and constructed many industrial plants the cost of which mounted far into the millions of dollars.

Aside from his professional activities, he was always interested in the problems of municipal and local government, and held numerous public offices and appointments. During his residence in Lawrence, he served as a member of the board of aldermen, was a member of the school board of Lawrence in 1890, and a trustee of the Public Library Association in 1891. He maintained his residence in Winchester, Massachusetts, for some years, and from 1895 to 1906 served as a member of its water and sewer board.

He is the author of several papers on steam power, water power, ventilation of industrial properties, mill construction, etc. His Notes on Mill Construction (1886) was used as a textbook at MIT. He is the originator of numerous devices and inventions, notably of a receiver pressure register for compound engines, which he perfected in 1884.

Main was a member of the American Society of Civil Engineers and the American Society of Mechanical Engineers (ASME) of which he was president. He received the ASME Medal in 1935 and was elected an honorary member of ASME in 1939. He was president of the Boston Society of Civil Engineers in 1912 and drafted a code of ethics during that time which was a first for engineering societies. He was a member of the National Association of Cotton Manufacturers, the New England Water Works Association, and the Corporation of the Massachusetts Institute of Technology. He was also a member of the Society of Arts of Boston, the Exchange Club of Boston, Engineers' Club of Boston, and Technology Club of Boston, the Engineers' Club of New York, and the Calumet Club of Winchester.

== Family ==
On November 14, 1883, he married Elizabeth F. Appleton, of Somerville, Massachusetts. They had three children: Charles Reed, Alice Appleton, and Theodore Main.

He died at his home in Winchester, Massachusetts on March 6, 1943.

== Notes ==
- Homans, James E., ed. (1918). "Main, Charles Thomas" . The Cyclopædia of American Biography. New York: The Press Association Compilers, Inc.
