= Edward Botwinick =

American entrepreneur

- Education: Columbia University (BA, BS)
- Occupations: IT Entrepreneur, investor
- Employer: Unisys
- Known for: Founding Timeplex
- Relatives: James Wolfensohn (brother-in-law)

Edward Botwinick is an American businessman, investor, and IT industry entrepreneur.

== Biography ==
Botwinick graduated from Columbia College with a BA in 1956 and the Columbia School of Engineering and Applied Science with a BS in 1958.

Upon graduating from Columbia, Botwinick worked for US Semiconductor Corporation before co-founding Silicon Transistor Corporation. After the company went public, it was acquired in 1963. From 1963 to 1967, Botwinick was president and a shareholder Quantum Inc. He then joined Goldman Sachs as Vice President of high-tech investment research and venture capital.

At Goldman, Botwinick, he learned of the opportunity to invest in American Data Systems, the company behind Time-division multipliers. He then invested, and co-founded Timeplex and became chairman and CEO of the company in 1977. In the next few years, he led the company to launch a number of successful statistical multiplexer products, including the T-1 multiplexers, and made it one of the first companies to use microprocessors in its systems.

In 1987, Unisys acquired Timeplex for $307 million and Botwinick became Senior Vice President of Unisys and President of Unisys Networks. He retired from Unisys in 1989.

Botwinick sat on the board of Duke Cancer Institute and Lamont–Doherty Earth Observatory, and was a trustee of Columbia University. He currently serves as a president of the Botwinick-Wolfensohn Foundation.

== Personal life and family ==
Botwinick's father was Benjamin Botwinick, businessman and philanthropist who founded Benjamin Botwinick & Co., a New York City accounting firm. His sister, Elaine Botwinick, was married to World Bank president James Wolfensohn.
