= James Wolfensohn =

Banker, former World Bank president

Sir James Wolfensohn KBE AO
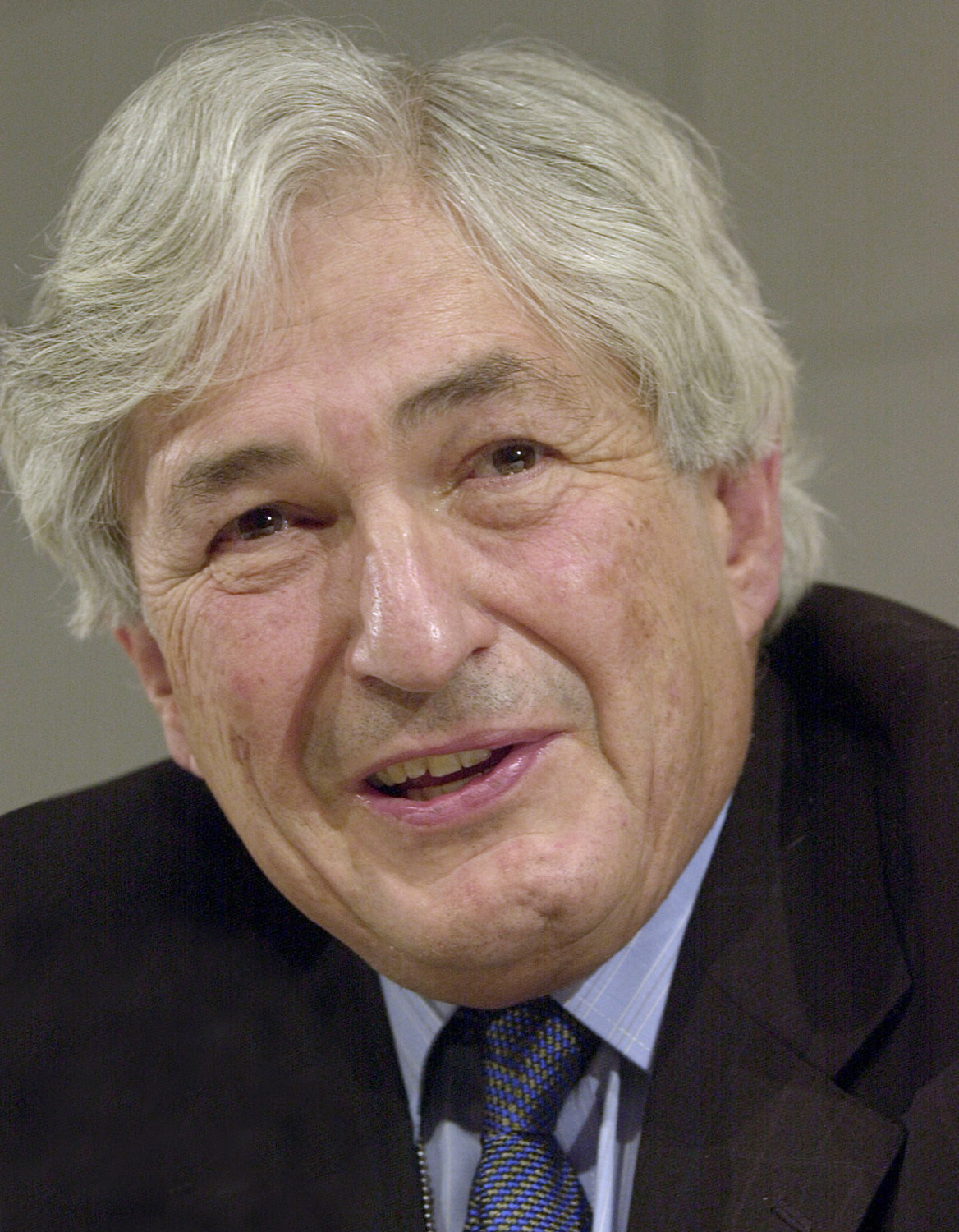

Special Envoy of the Quartet on the Middle East
- In office 14 April 2005 – 30 March 2006
- Preceded by: Office established
- Succeeded by: Tony Blair

President of the World Bank Group
- In office June 1, 1995 – May 31, 2005
- Preceded by: Ernest Stern (acting)
- Succeeded by: Paul Wolfowitz

Personal details
- Born: James David Wolfensohn; 1 December 1933 Sydney, Australia
- Died: 25 November 2020 (aged 86) New York City, New York, U.S.
- Spouse: Elaine Botwinick (m. 1961; died 2020)
- Relations: Edward Botwinick (brother-in-law)
- Children: 3
- Education: University of Sydney (BA, LLB); Harvard University (MBA)
- Website: Official website

Sir James David Wolfensohn KBE, AO (1 December 1933 – 25 November 2020) was an Australian-American lawyer, investment banker, and economist who served as the ninth president of the World Bank Group (1995–2005). During his tenure at the World Bank, he is credited with the focus on poverty alleviation and a rethink on development financing, earning him recognition as a banker to the world's poor. In his other roles, he is credited with actions that brought Chrysler Corporation back from the brink of bankruptcy, and also improving the finances of major United States cultural institutions, including Carnegie Hall and the Kennedy Center. He served two terms as president of the World Bank on the nomination of U.S. president Bill Clinton, and thereafter held various positions with charitable organizations and policy think-tanks including the Brookings Institution.

He was born in Sydney, Australia, and was a graduate of the University of Sydney and Harvard Business School; he was also an Olympic fencer. He worked for various companies in Britain and the United States before forming his own investment firm. Wolfensohn became an American citizen in 1980 and renounced his Australian citizenship, although he eventually regained it in 2010.

== Early life and education ==
Wolfensohn was born on 1 December 1933 in Sydney, New South Wales, Australia. His father Hyman, known as Bill, was born in London to Austrian-Jewish immigrants, while his mother Dora was born in Belgium to Polish parents. His father was a "highly intelligent but failed businessman" who had previously worked for the Rothschild banking family. Wolfensohn's parents arrived in Australia in 1928. He was named after James Armand de Rothschild, his father's former employer, whose birthday he shared. His mother sang with Australian radio and gave him piano lessons, instilling in him a love of the symphony. In high school, he was noted to have taken part in operas, including playing female roles in Gilbert and Sullivan operettas.

Wolfensohn grew up in a two-bedroom flat in Edgecliff. His father struggled financially, and in his autobiography, A Global Life, Wolfensohn described how monetary insecurity was a fact of life from childhood and explained that he was always looking for a cushion to protect himself from it. Wolfensohn attended Woollahra Public School, and then Sydney Boys High School. He entered the University of Sydney at the age of 16, graduating Bachelor of Arts (BA) and Bachelor of Laws (LLB). In 1959 he earned a Master of Business Administration (MBA) from Harvard Business School. In his 2010 memoirs he revealed that he failed several university classes, including English, and was a "late developer".

Wolfensohn was a member of the Australian fencing team at the 1956 Summer Olympics in Melbourne, participating in the Men's Team Épée and an officer in the Royal Australian Air Force.

== Business career ==
Before attending Harvard, Wolfensohn was a lawyer in the Australian law firm of Allen, Allen & Hemsley in Sydney (now Allens). Upon graduating from Harvard Business School, Wolfensohn worked briefly for Swiss cement giant Holderbank (now Holcim). He also worked for an air-conditioner company requiring him to travel across India, Nigeria, Greece, Mexico, Latin America, and other developing countries. He wrote in his memoir about the poverty and inequity, "The inequity was so striking that I could hardly absorb what was in front of me. I had known what to expect intellectually, but, the reality was a shock. It left an indelible mark that would influence my later life."

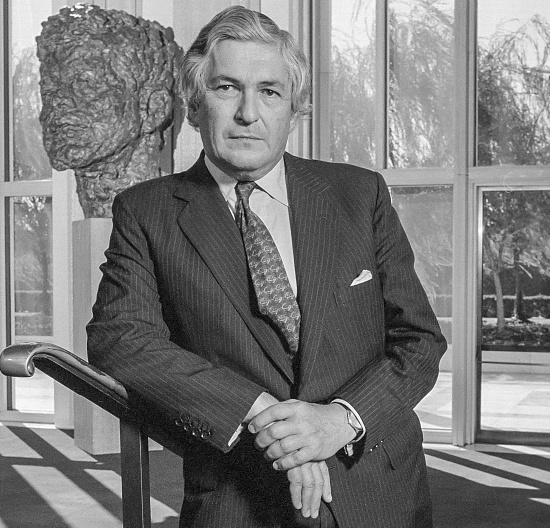
Wolfensohn at the Kennedy Center for the Performing Arts in 1990

He then returned to Australia, where he worked for various banking institutions, including Darling & Co. In the late 1960s, he became a director of Darling's major shareholder J. Henry Schroder & Co, a London-based investment bank. He was a senior executive in the London office before becoming managing director of the bank's New York City office from 1970 to 1976. He later became a senior executive at Salomon Brothers. In 1979, together with Chrysler Corporation's then chief executive officer Lee Iacocca and then President of the New York Fed Paul A. Volcker, who later became Chairman of the Board of Governors of the Federal Reserve System, Wolfensohn helped orchestrate the rescue of Chrysler from the verge of bankruptcy. In what has been described as the largest corporate bailout at that time, in addition to his banking skills he is noted to have played a role in smoothening a cultural rift between Lee Iacocca and Japanese Bankers, who went on to invest more than $600 million in the company.

In 1980, he became a naturalized citizen of the United States, after it was rumored that he was a candidate to succeed Robert McNamara as president of the World Bank. He renounced his Australian citizenship at this time. He next established his own investment firm, James D. Wolfensohn, Inc., along with partners including Paul Volcker. Upon accepting his nomination to serve as president of the World Bank in 1995, Wolfensohn divested of his ownership interest in James D. Wolfensohn, Inc. The firm was later bought by Bankers Trust. The firm had a diverse client which included Ralph Lauren Corporation and Mercedes-Benz.

During the 1980s and 1990s, he was the chairman of the Carnegie Hall and later of the Kennedy Center. At both of these places, he is credited with stabilizing the cultural organizations' finances and managing their budget shortfalls. At the Kennedy Center he pushed for a shift in programming toward "crowd pleasing" programs including Andrew Lloyd Webber's Phantom of the Opera and Cats. Clashes with this approach prompted staff like the artistic director Marta Istomin to quit in 1990.

In 2005, upon stepping down as president of the World Bank, he founded Wolfensohn & Company, LLC, a private firm that works with governments and large corporations doing business in emerging markets. He was also the chairman of the International Advisory Board of Citigroup. In 2009, he became a member of the International Advisory Council of the Chinese sovereign wealth fund China Investment Corporation.

== World Bank tenure and other public service ==
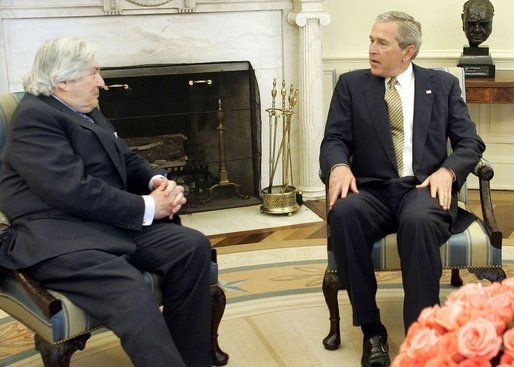
Wolfensohn (left) with U.S. President George W. Bush in the Oval Office, 2005.

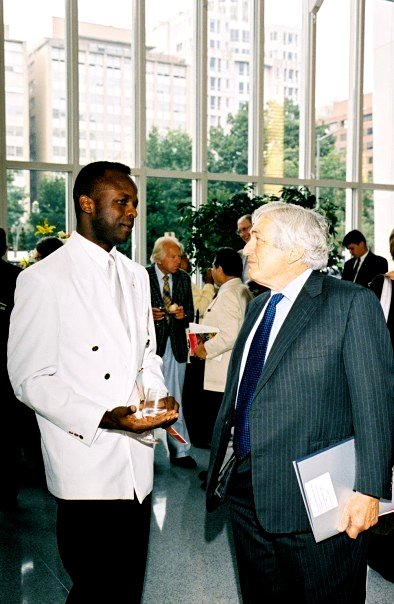
Nigerian artist Ibiyinka Alao and James D. Wolfensohn in Washington, D.C. in 2004.

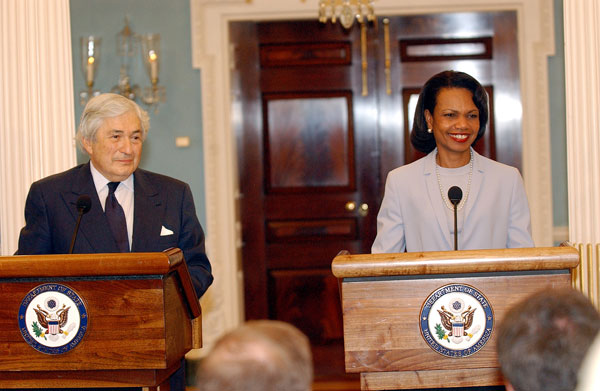
Wolfensohn speaking at a press conference with Condoleezza Rice in 2006.

Wolfensohn became the ninth president of the World Bank on 1 July 1995 after he was nominated by U.S. president Bill Clinton. He was unanimously supported by the bank's board of executive directors for a second five-year term in 2000, becoming the third person to serve two terms in the position after Eugene R. Black and Robert McNamara. He visited more than 120 countries around the world during his term as president. Speaking of the People's Republic of China, he said, "China never borrowed less than $3 billion a year during my tenure. They were the most significant client". He believed that the People's Republic of China sought to obtain know-how in addition to money from the Bank, with the People's Republic going from a net borrower to holding over two and a half trillion in foreign exchange reserves.

Wolfensohn is credited, with among other things, having been the first World Bank president to bring attention to the problem of corruption in the area of development financing. His reforms during his time at the World Bank earned him recognition as a champion of the world's poor. He is credited for reforms at the World Bank, including decentralization, technology investments, and moves towards openness. In June 1996, he wrote a memo that spot audits would occur after he established an in-house auditing staff at the World Bank. His time at the Bank was also a period of shift from complex infrastructure projects in developing economies to social-sector led programs. During this time, the World Bank became one of the largest funders of global primary education and health programs including HIV/AIDS programs. He also advanced debt release programs for many Africa and Latin American nations.

He brought attention to contemporary Africa when he hosted the award-winning visual artist Ibiyinka Alao during the show "Visions and Vignettes" presented by the World Bank Art Program.

On 3 January 2005, Wolfensohn announced he would not seek a third term as president. During his term, the Alfalfa Club named him as their nominee for President of the United States in 2000 as part of a long-standing tradition, despite being constitutionally ineligible due to the natural-born citizen clause in Article II of the United States Constitution. He served as an advisor to the Grassroots Business Fund.

== Mideast envoy ==
In April 2005, Wolfensohn was appointed special envoy for Gaza disengagement by the Quartet on the Middle East, a group of major powers and the United Nations promoting the Israeli-Palestinian peace process. He resigned after 11 months as special envoy when he understood the United States government to be undermining his efforts and firing his staff.

According to him the major blame for the failure of his Middle East mission lay with him. "I feel that if anything, I was stupid for not reading the small print," he admitted. "I was never given the mandate to negotiate the peace." Former British prime minister, Tony Blair, would succeed him in this role.

== Civic and charitable activities ==
In 2006, Wolfensohn founded the Wolfensohn Center for Development at the Brookings Institution, a Washington, D.C.–based think tank. The centre examined how to implement, scale up, and sustain development interventions to solve key development challenges at a national, regional, and global level and strove to bridge the gap between development theorists and practitioners. Its projects focused on youth exclusion in the Middle East, large-scale anti-poverty programs, reforms of global economic governance, and regional cooperation, particularly in Central Asia. The Center concluded work after five years.

Wolfensohn was a trustee of the Rockefeller Foundation, and also served as an honorary trustee of the Brookings Institution. He was a trustee and past chairman of the board of trustees of the Institute for Advanced Study in Princeton, New Jersey. He was chairman emeritus of the John F. Kennedy Center for the Performing Arts in Washington, D.C., and also of the Carnegie Hall in New York City. He was a member of the non-profit think tank the Council on Foreign Relations. In July 2008, Wolfensohn was selected as one of the inaugural fellows of the Australian Institute of International Affairs. He served on the board of various charitable foundations, including the Wolfensohn Family Foundation.

Between 1985 and 2015 Wolfensohn attended 27 conferences of the Bilderberg Group, which rendered him one of the most frequent participants of the organization during this time period. He also attended meetings of the Aspen Institute and the World Economic Forum. He was a one time a member of the Steering Committee of the Bilderberg Group. In 2004, Wolfensohn was the commencement speaker at Brandeis University. Wolfensohn sat on the board of Endeavor (non-profit). He was a member of the Honorary Board of the International Paralympic Committee.

== Personal life ==
Wolfensohn married Elaine Botwinick, sister of IT entrepreneur Edward Botwinick, in 1961. They had three children and seven grandchildren. Botwinick died in August 2020, three months before Wolfensohn's death.

In New York City, he once found himself at a Jerusalem Foundation lunch next to Dorothy de Rothschild, widow of James. She could not tell him why his father suddenly had left Rothschild six decades earlier. But he was reassured that his father had been a "wonderful man".

Wolfensohn began cello studies with Jacqueline du Pré, a friend, at the age of 41 when she offered to teach him on the condition that he perform on his 50th birthday at Carnegie Hall in New York City, which he did. He repeated the exercise on his 60th and 70th birthdays with Yo-Yo Ma and Bono. He continued to play and appeared, together with musician friends, at private events at Carnegie Hall and elsewhere.

In October 2010, he regained his Australian citizenship, that he had renounced earlier. Wolfensohn was a resident of Jackson Hole, Wyoming.

Wolfensohn died on 25 November 2020 in Manhattan of complications from pneumonia, aged 86, six days short of his 87th birthday.

== Honours ==
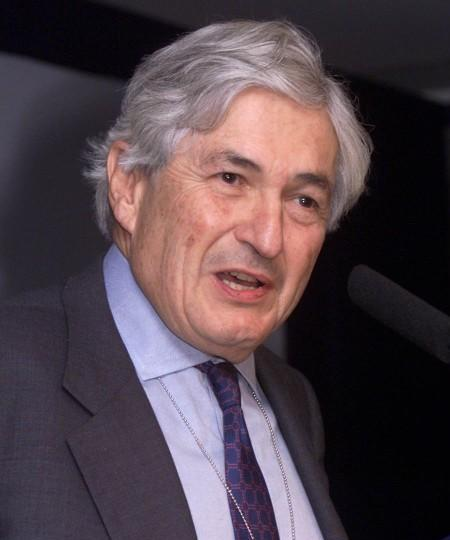
Wolfensohn in 2000

Wolfensohn received numerous awards throughout his life. He became an honorary officer of the Order of Australia in 1987, received the Golden Plate Award of the American Academy of Achievement in 1993, and an honorary knighthood of the Order of the British Empire in 1995 for his service to the arts. The University of New South Wales conferred an honorary degree of Doctor of Science on him in 2006, and he received the Award of Excellence from The International Center in New York.

In 2006, Wolfensohn received the Leo Baeck Medal for his humanitarian work promoting tolerance and social justice. In 2011, he was awarded the Golden Biatec Award, the highest award bestowed by Slovakia's Informal Economic Forum – Economic Club, for his contribution to addressing global priorities. At the 2016 Summer Olympics, Wolfensohn was inducted into the Olympians for Life project.

He was a member of both the American Academy of Arts & Sciences and the American Philosophical Society.

== Bibliography ==
- James D. Wolfensohn: "Social Development", in: Frank-Jürgen Richter, Pamela Mar: Asia's New Crisis, John Wiley 2004; ISBN 0-470-82129-9
- Sebastian Mallaby (2004) The World's Banker: A Story of Failed States, Financial Crises, and the Wealth and Poverty of Nations. Critical biography by former Economist writer and Washington Post contributor, emphasis on World Bank; ISBN 1-59420-023-8.
- James D. Wolfensohn and Andrew Kircher (2005) Voice for the World's Poor: Selected Speeches and Writings of World Bank President James D. Wolfensohn, 1995–2005; ISBN 978-0-8213-6156-6. Collection of speeches, articles, memoranda and op-eds.
- James D. Wolfensohn (2010). A Global Life: My Journey among Rich and Poor, from Wall Street to the World Bank, p. 96. Pan MacMillan; ISBN 978-1-58648-255-8

Diplomatic posts
Preceded by Ernest Stern (acting)	President of the World Bank Group; 1995–2005	Succeeded by Paul Wolfowitz
New office	Special Envoy of the Quartet; 2005–2006	Vacant Title next held by Tony Blair
