= The Man Who Knew =

2016 biography of Alan Greenspan

- First edition (UK)
- Author: Sebastian Mallaby
- Publication date: 2016

The Man Who Knew: The Life and Times of Alan Greenspan is a biography of the former Chairman of the Federal Reserve Alan Greenspan, written by Council on Foreign Relations Senior Fellow Sebastian Mallaby. It was published in 2016 by Bloomsbury Press.

In the book, Mallaby addresses questions about Greenspan that emerged during the 2008 financial crisis. "Mr. Greenspan is a fascinating subject because for so long he was considered a genius, only to later be blamed for the financial crisis," wrote Andrew Ross Sorkin, reviewing the book in the New York Times. "Mr. Mallaby does an exquisite job going beyond these two versions of the Greenspan narrative and taking the reader inside the complicated mind of a man who may have had one of the largest ever influences over our economy."

The Man Who Knew won the 2016 Financial Times and McKinsey Business Book of the Year Award, was named a New York Times Notable Book of 2016, a Foreign Affairs Best Book of 2016, and an Economist Book of the Year.
