= Chas. T. Main =

US engineering company

- Industry: Power generation
- Founded: 1893
- Founder: Charles T. Main
- Fate: Bought in 1985
- Headquarters: Boston, USA

Chas. T. Main Inc. was an engineering company of the United States founded in 1893 and specialized in power generation—mainly hydroelectric power. In 1985, the company was bought by Parsons Corporation.

== History ==
It was founded in 1893 by Charles T. Main, an engineer for the textile mills of New England. It was privately owned by its senior engineers, it being felt that this would leave decision making to those that knew the industry best. In addition to the then-traditional business of water and steam power, Main soon expanded into the new field of water resource engineering and hydroelectric generation. In 1949 it began an association with the United States Atomic Energy Commission working on projects relating to plutonium-based nuclear reactors. It rose to become a worldwide player in the utility industries, providing many wide-ranging engineering services. For example, in the mid-1950s Charles T. Main was responsible for the building of a hydro-electric plant in Turkey (Sarıyar Dam) and developing a plan to unify development of the water resources of the Jordan River Valley for its surrounding countries, Jordan, Syria, and Israel.

Main also provided economic and consulting services including forecasting, impact, allocation, and feasibility studies. Former Main consultant John Perkins is author of the book Confessions of an Economic Hit Man, which deals with the issues of third world debt and neo-colonialism.

In the mid 1980s, mismanagement led to the downfall of Main and it was bought by Parsons Corporation of Pasadena, California in 1985, which changed its name to Parsons Main, Inc. in January 1992.
