= John Perkins (author) =

American author (born 1945)

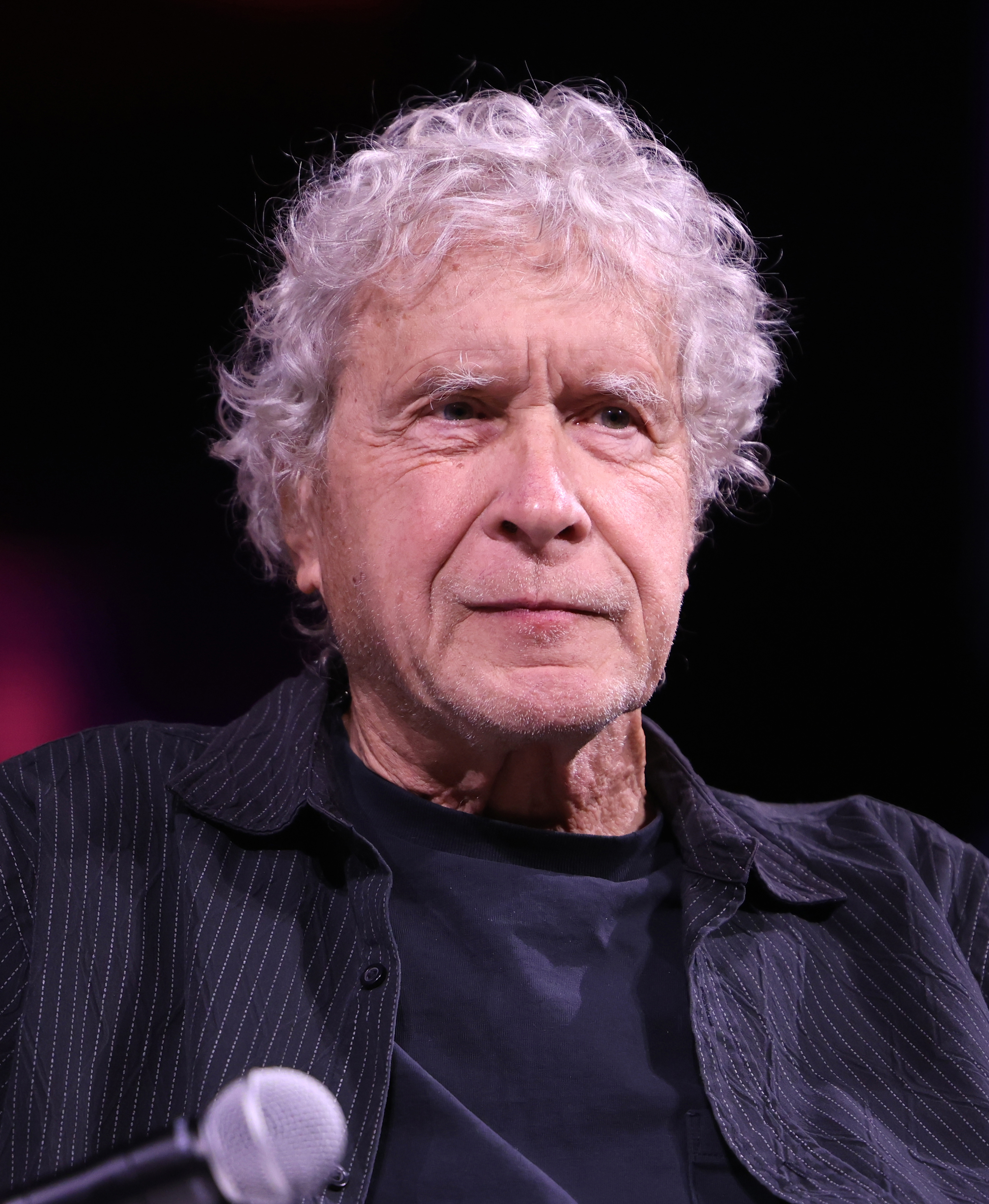
- Perkins in 2025
- Born: January 28, 1945 (age 81); Hanover, New Hampshire, U.S.
- Education: Boston University (BS)
- Children: 1
- Writing career
- Notable work: Confessions of an Economic Hit Man (2004)
- Website: johnperkins.org

Signature
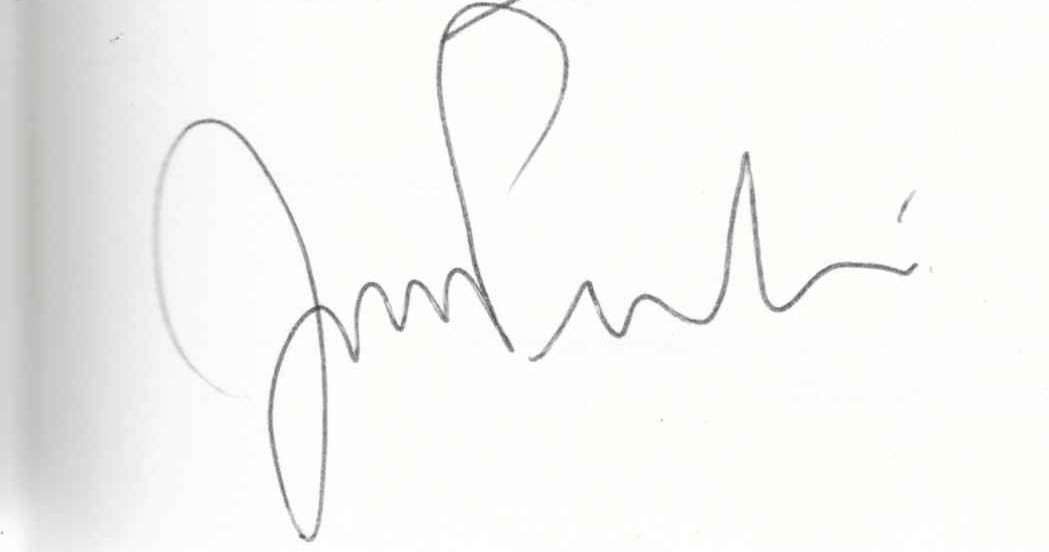

John Perkins (born January 28, 1945) is an American author. His best known book is Confessions of an Economic Hit Man (2004), in which Perkins describes playing a role in a process of economic colonization of Third World countries on behalf of what he portrays as a cabal of corporations, banks, international financial institutions, and the United States government. Perkins' claims were strongly contested by some involved parties as well as those familiar with the topics, and the book spent more than 70 weeks on the New York Times bestseller list.

Perkins has also written about mystical aspects of indigenous cultures, including shamanism.

== Life and career ==
Perkins graduated from the Tilton School in 1963. He subsequently attended Middlebury College for two years before dropping out. He later earned a Bachelor of Science degree in business administration from Boston University in 1968. He was a Peace Corps Volunteer in Ecuador from 1968 to 1970. He spent the 1970s working for the Boston strategic-consulting firm Chas. T. Main. He said he was screened for the job by the National Security Agency (NSA). Perkins states that he was seduced and trained as an "economic hitman" by a businesswoman named Claudine Martin, who used his NSA personality profile to manipulate and control him.

As chief economist at Chas. T. Main, Perkins said he advised the World Bank, United Nations, IMF, U.S. Treasury Department, Fortune 500 corporations, and countries in Africa, Asia, Latin America, and the Middle East. Perkins states that he worked directly with heads of state and CEOs of major companies. Perkins's time at Chas T. Main provides the basis for his subsequent statements that, as an "economic hit man", he was charged with inducing developing countries to borrow large amounts of money, designated to pay for questionable infrastructure investments, but ultimately with a view to making the debt-laden countries more dependent, economically and politically, upon the West.

In the 1980s, Perkins left Main and founded and directed an independent energy company. Perkins implies in New Confessions of an Economic Hitman, published in 2016, that he was poisoned in 2005 on behalf of the NSA or CIA. Doctors diagnosed him with diverticulosis.

== Assessments of Confessions of an Economic Hit Man ==
Confessions of an Economic Hit Man provoked strong reviews, with many critics saying Perkins made false or unverified claims in the book.

Sebastian Mallaby, economics columnist of the Washington Post, described Perkins as "a conspiracy theorist, a vainglorious peddler of nonsense, and yet his book, Confessions of an Economic Hit Man, is a runaway bestseller". Mallaby, a member of the Council on Foreign Relations, said Perkins' conception of international finance is "largely a dream" and his "basic contentions are flat wrong". As an example, Mallaby stated how Indonesia reduced its infant mortality and illiteracy rates by two-thirds after economists persuaded its leaders to borrow money in 1970.

Articles in the New York Times and Boston magazine said there was a lack of documentary or testimonial evidence to corroborate the claim that the NSA was involved in Perkins' hiring by Chas T. Main. After an investigation, the New York Times concluded that "the arc of Mr. Perkins's career seems to be described accurately", although they did not find evidence to support "some of his fancier claims," including those involving the NSA.

A number of Perkins' former colleagues disagreed with his perspective on the company and contradicted specific claims he made; Frank Fullerton, one of his supervisors, stated Perkins left Chas T. Main because he "thought he was worth more than he was". Einar Greve, the former vice president of Chas. T. Main who first offered Perkins a job at the firm, agreed with Perkins that foreign debt had harmful effects and also represented a poor economic strategy for developing nations:

Basically his story is true.… What John's book says is, there was a conspiracy to put all these countries on the hook, and that happened. Whether or not it was some sinister plot or not is up to interpretation, but many of these countries are still over the barrel and have never been able to repay the loans.

However, Greve denied many other aspects of Perkins' book, such as the NSA having any links to Main, or that Perkins was seduced by Claudine Martin. Instead, Greve believes Perkins has convinced himself the false parts of his story are accurate.

A review in Boston Magazine wrote how Perkins provided the magazine with a "flimsy package of materials" to verify the claims he made in the book.

In 2006, the US State Department stated much of the book "appears to be a total fabrication ... the National Security Agency is a cryptological (codemaking and codebreaking) organization, not an economic organization ... Neither of [its] missions involves anything remotely resembling placing economists at private companies in order to increase the debt of foreign countries."

== Bibliography ==
- Confessions of an Economic Hitman Trilogy includes Confessions of an Economic Hitman ( ISBN 978-1576753019), The New Confessions of an Economic Hitman ( ISBN 978-1626566743), and Confessions of an Economic Hitman, 3rd Edition ( ISBN 978-1523001897)
- The Art of the Steal: Trump and The Economic Hit Man Presidency (September 8,2026), Berrett-Koehler Publishers; ISBN 979-8890572554
- Touching the Jaguar: Transforming Fear into Action to Change Your Life and the World (2020), Berrett-Koehler Publishers; ISBN 1523089865, 978-1523089864.
- The New Confessions of an Economic Hitman (2016), Berrett-Koehler Publishers; ISBN 9781626566743.
- Hoodwinked: An Economic Hit Man Reveals Why the World Financial Markets Imploded – and What We Need to Do to Remake Them (2009), Crown Business; ISBN 0-307-58992-7
- The Secret History of the American Empire (2007), Plume; ISBN 0-525-95015-X
- A Game as Old as Empire: the Secret World of Economic Hit Men and the Web of Global Corruption (edited by Steven Hiatt, introduction by John Perkins) (2007), Berrett-Koehler; ISBN 9781576753958
- Confessions of an Economic Hit Man (2004), Berrett-Koehler; ISBN 9781576753019

Perkins's books on mystical aspects of indigenous cultures, including shamanism, include:

- Spirit of the Shuar: Wisdom from the Last Unconquered People of the Amazon (2001), co-authors Shakaim Mariano Shakai Ijisam Chumpi, Shakaim Mariano Ijisam Chumpi, Destiny Books, ISBN 0-89281-865-4
- Psychonavigation: Techniques for Travel Beyond Time (2nd 1999), Destiny Books, ISBN 0-89281-800-X
- Shapeshifting: Shamanic Techniques for Global and Personal Transformation (1997), Destiny Books, ISBN 0-89281-663-5
- The World Is As You Dream It: Teachings from the Amazon and Andes (1994), Destiny Books, ISBN 0-89281-459-4
- The Stress Free Habit: Powerful Techniques for Health and Longevity from the Andes, Yucatan, and the Far East (1989), Healing Arts Books, ISBN 978-0892812929
