= Ibiyinka Alao =

Nigerian artist (born 1975)

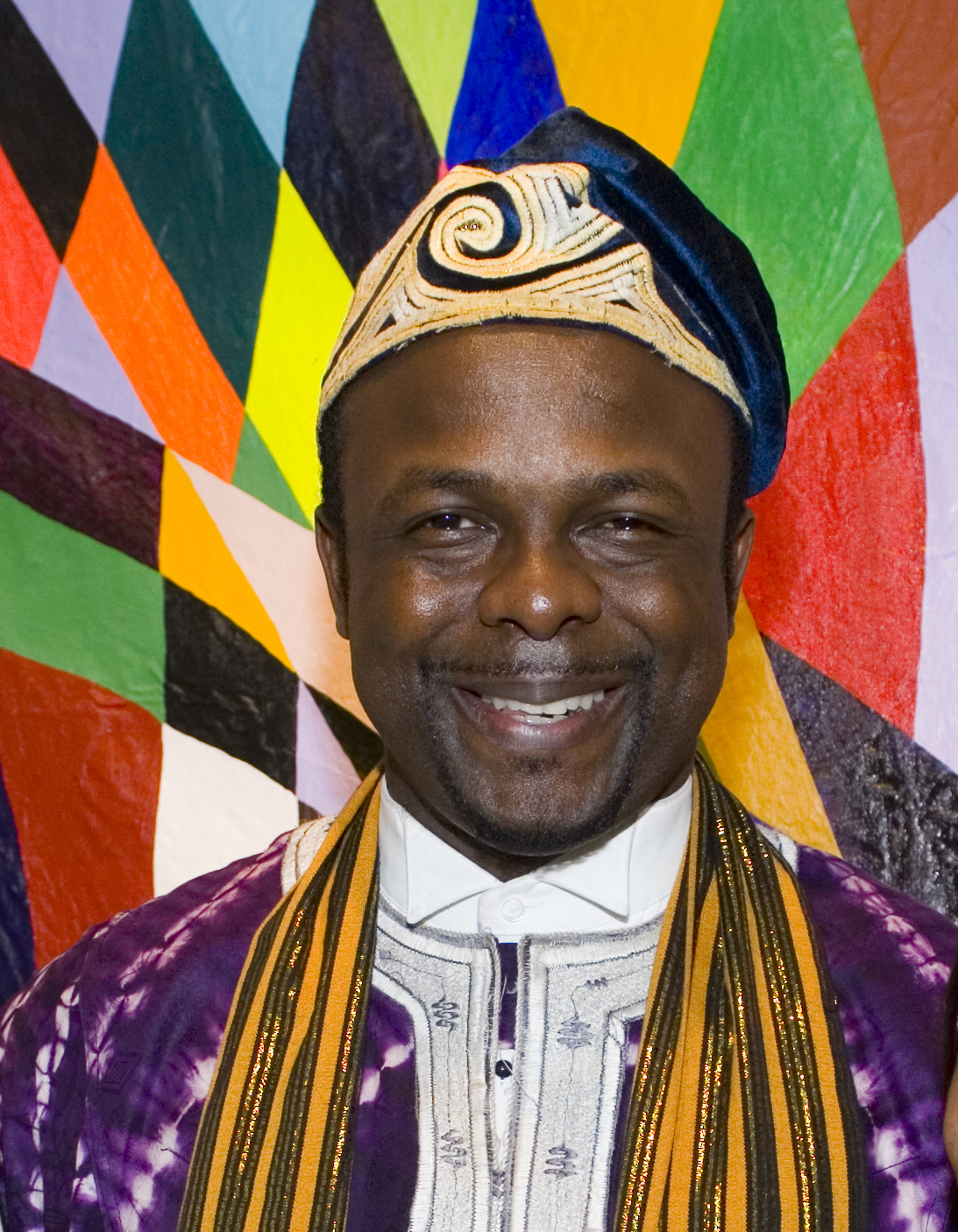
- Born: Ibiyinka Olufemi Alao; Kogi State, Nigeria
- Education: Architecture
- Known for: Contemporary Art
- Notable work: Fireflies
- Awards: United Nations
- Patrons: The World Bank

Ibiyinka Olufemi Alao is an American artist, architect, writer, film director and musical theatre composer of Nigerian descent.

In a worldwide contest organized by the United Nations headquarters in New York City to determine the artist whose work best represents the charter for Peace, Alao's work was the winner in the adult category.

Alao's artworks are characterised by bright colours. They express themes including hope, joy, peace and love – a reflection of his West African roots and Christian faith.

== Biography ==
He is from Ponyan in Iyagba East Local Government area of Kogi State. His father is Ezekiel Bamisaiye Alao and his mother is Grace Bosede Alao. He has two brothers and two sisters. He and his wife, Kaila live in Pennsylvania.

Alao attended the Nigerian Navy Secondary School (NNSS) in Navy Town, Lagos. He obtained an A-Level certificate in Physics at Kwara State Polytechnic and studied Architecture at the Obafemi Awolowo University in Ile-Ife. After graduating, he worked as an architect and civil engineer with the State Ministry of Works and Housing Development.

The organisation Global Citizen has described him as an artist "spread[ing] messages of peace". Alao's work to make peacemakers of children and adults was the focus of a PBS American Dreams documentary broadcast in April 2025 called Ibiyinka Alao: Fireflies and Stories of Hope.

In Japan, he is an advisor to the non-profit Ashinaga. In the UK, Alao's work was exhibited by the British Council and he is on the advisory board of the Lightup Foundation, a youth-focussed nonprofit organization committed to civic engagement and social development.

== Fireflies ==
Fireflies are part of Alao's artworks because of his memories of childhood experiences of them in West Africa. He has spoken about fireflies in schools to help children "realize that interests in art and science are not mutually exclusive".

== Career ==
In 2005, he was named Nigeria's "Ambassador of Art" by The President and Commander in Chief of The Armed Forces. Alao won first place in the United Nations International Art Contest involving participants from 61 countries.

Alao worked on a painting that is a background for his "My Fireflies" Musical Theater. "Eternity" is one of the largest paintings in the world, measuring 100 ft (30.50 meters) wide X 12 ft (3.70 meters) tall. The painting was unveiled accompanied by song and dance in Pennsylvania. This painting is currently on display as a planetarium experience at Mauch Chunk Museum and Cultural Center where Alao serves as Artist-in-Residence and President of the Board of Directors. This Museum is a contributing building to the Old Mauch Chunk Historic District, listed in the National Register of Historic Places in 1977. My FireFlies, a feature animated movie based on this painting was released by Fireflyers International Network(FIN) in celebration of World Firefly Day.

Alao is an art ambassador for Nigeria.

Alao's paintings have been used in art therapy for mental health, for creating peacemakers and building up community. They are displayed in prisons and hospitals.

Alao's artworks have been exhibited at the Nigerian National Museum, the British Council, the Royal Netherlands Embassy, the Metropolitan Museum of Art in New York City, the Smithsonian Museum in Washington DC, The World Bank Headquarters in Washington DC, The headquarters of the United Nations in New York City, the Harvard Business School in Cambridge, Massachusetts, the Empire State Building in New York City and the Martin Luther King Center. Alao was invited by the director general to attend the SEC 25 class, and give a lecture at the National Institute for Policy and Strategic Studies (NIPSS) where he talked to the participants about the importance of art in diplomacy and government policies about peace. He is an honorary member of the National Institute.

James Wolfensohn, the chairman emeritus of Carnegie Hall in New York City and former president of the World Bank Group, hosted Alao's artworks during the exhibit "Visions and Vignettes" - a collection of 18 contemporary colourful Tempera pieces. It was curated by the World Bank Art Program in partnership with the Smithsonian Museum. Three pieces of Alao's work are in the permanent collection of the World Bank.

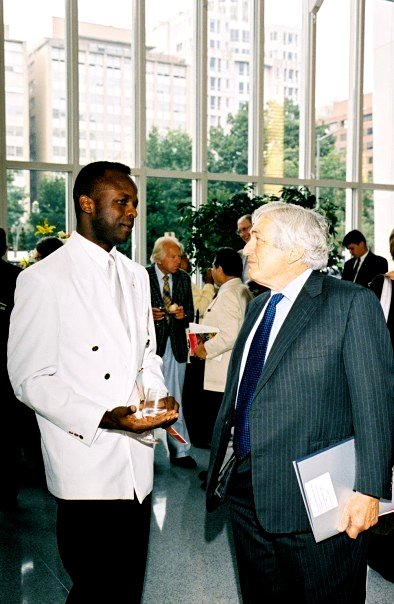
Ibiyinka Alao and James D. Wolfensohn in Washington DC

The Children's Museum of Pittsburgh hosted Alao as a 2020 inaugural Tough Art at Home Artist in Residence. They produced a video from his studio of Alao telling a story and teaching children how to paint with light using chiaroscuro.

Bucknell University in Pennsylvania and Middlebury College in Vermont hosted Alao for an art/science residency during the autumn of 2021 to 2025 and 2023 respectively with funding focussed on firefly research from National Science Foundation.

== Philosophy ==
In an interview with Curator Magazine, Alao discussed the necessity of making art accessible to everyone, stating that many big art institutions, especially in the Western world, are yet to come to terms with a way of showing art without making it appeal only to the elite, thereby losing its meaning:

I have never been able to conceive how any rational system will take the very things that were given us to travel better on this spiritual journey, lock them up in a building, and only open up to tell people about how great journey the artist undertook or what a great time the Art was made in. I sometimes feel as if in the West, most art institutions are set up this way and rarely engage people in the present. We therefore feel alienated from the Art and most people end up feeling Art is only for an elite group of people.

=== "A Bird of Fire" ===
The art critic and poet Pascal Letellier of the French Cultural Centre observed a special exhibit of Alao's work presented by the Royal Netherlands Embassy and British Council in 2002. Originally written in French, this critique was translated into English by the British Council and included in the catalogue.

Ibiyinka must have been forged in the mould of the spiritual Yoruba. He is a first rate poet. He is a Bird of Fire, a wizard. He carries his tranquillity the same way as those who know the mysteries of the World. His big sketches are not portraits. The multicoloured costumes of the men standing are like the universe which face and invite us- These big embroidered gowns are like the firmament, they occupy all the space when they are displayed. They are as many dreamlike stories to bewitch us although they come from the perfect knowledge of lost traditions- there is an application to detail that cannot pass unnoticed, attention to perfection in folds, colourful arrangements, secret ornaments. These masterpieces of great patience illustrate the peaceful and surprising research, conducted alone by a unique artist, in the remote region of a Nigerian Imagination.

Ibiyinka is a traveler to observe. Each time I meet him, he is coming back from one of these imaginary journeys. Today he is ready, he is "mature" as we say, to carry his world of fantasy to other naive views, other distant opinion, to talk in silence to those who are ready to listen, the grace and magic spell of Africa.

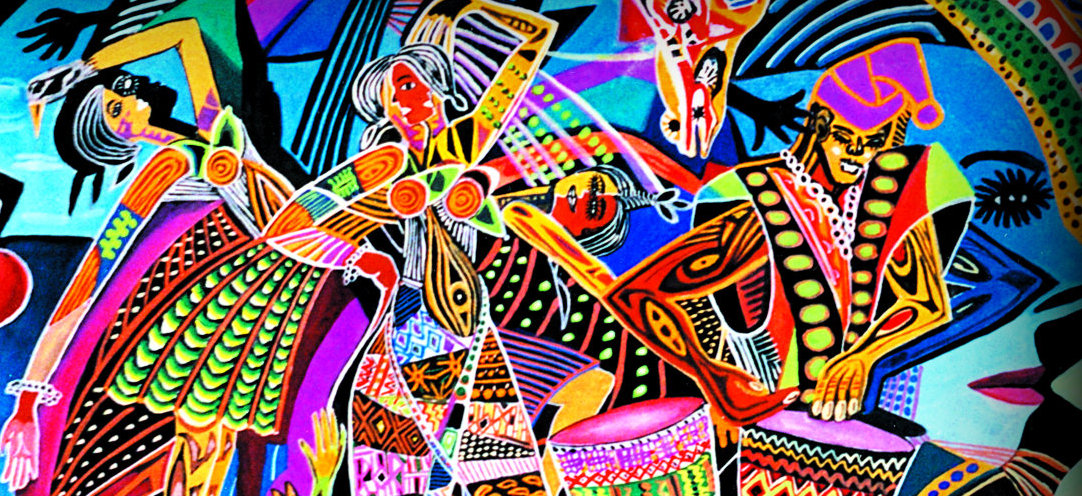
Mortal Feelings by Ibiyinka
