= The Department of Mad Scientists =

Book by Michael Belfiore

The Department of Mad Scientists: How DARPA Is Remaking Our World, from the Internet to Artificial Limbs
- Author: Michael Belfiore
- Language: English
- Subject: DARPA
- Genre: Non-fiction
- Publisher: HarperCollins
- Publication date: 2009
- Publication place: United States
- ISBN: 9780061577932

The Department of Mad Scientists: How DARPA is Remaking Our World, from the Internet to Artificial Limbs, is a book by Michael Belfiore about the history and origins of DARPA. Belfiore describes DARPA's creation as the agency ARPA in Department of Defense and some of its notable contributions to artificial limbs, the Internet, space exploration and robotic automobiles.

== Reception ==
In his review of the book, Tom Simonite says "Belfiore does a good job of exploring the sunny side of the moon that is DARPA", but also notes that the author had no access to DARPA's classified research, which constitutes approximately half of all work. Robin Tatu also observes Belfiore's limited access, but calls the book a "an engaging inquiry into the workings of the agency, its past contributions, and its concerns for future technology." David Pitt describes the book as "a capsule history" that, "for some readers [..] serves as a tantalizing introduction to subject that bears deeper exploration."
