= Michael Belfiore =

American author and journalist

Michael Belfiore is an author and journalist. Some of his notable works include The Department of Mad Scientists: How DARPA is Remaking Our World, published by Smithsonian Books Rocketeers, and The Way People Live - Life Aboard a Space Station. He has written numerous articles for Popular Mechanics and Popular Science
