= More Money Than God =

2010 financial book by Sebastian Mallaby

- Hardcover
- Author: Sebastian Mallaby
- Language: English
- Subject: Finance, Hedge fund, Asset management
- Publisher: Penguin Press
- Publication date: June 10, 2010
- Publication place: United States
- Media type: Print (hardback)
- Pages: 496
- ISBN: 1594202559
- OCLC: 462897580

More Money Than God: Hedge Funds and the Making of a New Elite (2010) is a financial book by Sebastian Mallaby published by Penguin Press. Mallaby's work has been published in the Financial Times, The Washington Post, The New York Times, The Wall Street Journal, and the Atlantic Monthly as columnist, editor and editorial board member. He is a senior fellow for international economics at the Council on Foreign Relations (CFR). The book is a history of the hedge fund industry in the United States looking at the people, institutions, investment tools and concepts of hedge funds. It claims to be the "first authoritative history of the hedge fund industry." It is written for a general audience and originally published by Penguin Press. It was nominated for the 2010 Financial Times and Goldman Sachs Business Book of the Year Award and was one of The Wall Street Journal's 10-Best Books of 2010. The Journal said it was "The fullest account we have so far of a too-little-understood business that changed the shape of finance and no doubt will continue to do so."

In a review in The New York Times, the book was called a "smart history of the hedge fund business" that explains "how finance’s richest moguls made their loot," and "argues that the obsessive, charismatic oddballs of the hedge fund world are Wall Street’s future — and possibly its salvation."

== Summary ==
In each chapter, Mallaby takes a narrative focus on one individual or company that played an important role in the history of hedge funds. Mallaby then weaves in other people, ideas or companies related to the star of the chapter. The following are some of the major people, institutions and concepts on a per chapter basis. The first in each list is the central character of that chapter.

- Ch 1 Big Daddy: A. W. Jones, Hedge fund
- Ch 2 The Block Trader: Michael Steinhardt, Steinhardt, Fine, Berkowitz & Co., Block trade, Monetary policy
- Ch 3 Paul Samuelson's Secret: Commodities Corporation, Paul Samuelson, Bruce Kovner (Caxton Corporation), Trend trading, Automated trading system
- Ch 4 The Alchemist: George Soros, Quantum Fund, Reflexivity, Jim Rogers
- Ch 5 Top Cat: Julian Robertson, Tiger Management
- Ch 6 Rock-and-Roll Cowboy: Paul Tudor Jones II
- Ch 7 White Wednesday: Black Wednesday, Stanley Druckenmiller and George Soros
- Ch 8 Hurricane Greenspan: Shadow banking system, 1994 bond market crisis, Stanley Druckenmiller and George Soros
- Ch 9 Soros vs Soros: 1997 Asian financial crisis, 1998 Russian financial crisis, Stanley Druckenmiller and George Soros
- Ch 10 The Enemy Is Us: Long-Term Capital Management, John Meriwether
- Ch 11 The Dot-Com Double: Dot-com bubble, Tiger Management and Quantum Fund
- Ch 12 The Yale Men: David Swensen, Tom Steyer, Event-driven investing
- Ch 13 The Code Breakers: Renaissance Technologies, James Simons, David E. Shaw
- Ch 14 Premonitions of a Crisis: Amaranth Advisors, Brian Hunter
- Ch 15 Riding the Storm: John Paulson, Subprime mortgage crisis
- Ch 16 "How Could They Do This": 2008 financial crisis

== Editions ==
- More Money Than God: Hedge Funds and the Making of a New Elite. Penguin Press, 2010. Hardcover USA. ISBN 978-1-59420-255-1
- More Money Than God: Hedge Funds and the Making of a New Elite. Penguin Paperbacks, 2011. Paperback USA. ISBN 978-0-14-311941-8
- More Money Than God: Hedge Funds and the Making of a New Elite. Bloomsbury Publishing, 2011. Paperback UK. ISBN 978-1-4088-0975-4
- Kindle other electronic book editions.
- Audiobook edition by Audible Audio, narrated by Alan Nebelthau.

== See also ==
- The Quants (2010) a by Scott Patterson
- The Big Short (2010) by Michael Lewis
