= Sebastian Mallaby =

English journalist and author (born 1964)

- Born: Sebastian Christopher Peter Mallaby; May 1964 (age 62)
- Education: Eton College
- Alma mater: Oxford University
- Occupations: Author, journalist
- Spouse: Zanny Minton Beddoes
- Children: 4
- Parent(s): Sir Christopher Mallaby; Pascale Mallaby

Sebastian Christopher Peter Mallaby (born May 1964) is an English journalist and author, Paul A. Volcker senior fellow for international economics at the Council on Foreign Relations (CFR), and contributing columnist at The Washington Post. Formerly, he was a contributing editor for the Financial Times and a columnist and editorial board member at The Washington Post.

His recent writings have been published in The New York Times, The Wall Street Journal, and the Atlantic Monthly. His books include The Man Who Knew (2016), More Money Than God (2010), and The World's Banker (2004).

== Early life ==
Sebastian Mallaby was born in May 1964, the son of Sir Christopher Mallaby, who was Ambassador of the United Kingdom to Germany (1988–1993) and Ambassador of the United Kingdom to France (1993–1996), and Lady Mallaby. He was educated at Eton College, won an academic scholarship to Oxford University, and graduated in 1986 with a first class degree in modern history.

== Career ==
Mallaby worked at The Washington Post from 1999 to 2007 as a columnist and member of the editorial board. Prior to that he spent thirteen years with The Economist in London, where he wrote about foreign policy and international finance. He also spent time in Africa, where he covered Nelson Mandela's release and the collapse of apartheid; and in Japan, where he covered the breakdown of the country's political and economic consensus during the 1990’s.

Between 1997 and 1999, Mallaby was The Economist’s Washington bureau chief and wrote the magazine's weekly "Lexington" column on American politics and foreign policy. Foreign Affairs published his essay "The Reluctant Imperialist" about failed states in 2002. Mallaby is a two-time Pulitzer Prize finalist: in 2005 for editorials on Darfur and in 2007 for a series on economic inequality in America.

He wrote a long article for The Guardian on 'the cult of the expert - and how it collapsed'.

== Books ==
Mallaby's books include After Apartheid (1992), which was a New York Times Notable Book. The World's Banker (2004) is a portrait of the World Bank under James Wolfensohn. An essay in the Financial Times said of The World's Banker, "Mallaby's book may well be the most hilarious depiction of a big organization and its controversial boss since Michael Lewis's Liar's Poker."

Mallaby published a history of the hedge-fund industry in More Money Than God: Hedge Funds and the Making of a New Elite (2010). Washington Post columnist Steve Pearlstein called it "the definitive history of the hedge fund industry, a compelling narrative full of larger-than-life characters and dramatic tales of their financial triumphs and reversals." It was the recipient of the 2011 Gerald Loeb Award, a finalist in the 2010 Financial Times and Goldman Sachs Business Book of the Year Award, and a 2010 New York Times bestseller.

After five years of research and in-person interviews, Mallaby's The Man Who Knew: The Life and Times of Alan Greenspan was published in October 2016. A biography of former Fed Chair Alan Greenspan, it was praised by former Governor of the Bank of England Mervyn King as "a fascinating and balanced study of arguably the most important figure of the post-war global financial scene." It won the 2016 Financial Times and McKinsey Business Book of the Year Award.

In 2022, Mallaby published his fifth book, The Power Law: Venture Capital and the Making of the New Future, a history of the venture capital industry's development in the U.S. and globally over the last seven decades.

In 2026, Mallaby published his sixth book, The Infinity Machine: Demis Hassabis, DeepMind, and the Quest for Superintelligence, a biography of Nobel laureate Demis Hassabis and the founder of DeepMind an artificial intelligence company.

== Personal life ==
Mallaby is married to the English journalist Zanny Minton Beddoes, who is the editor-in-chief of The Economist and the first woman to hold the position. They have four children.
