= Stephen Downing (producer) =

American film producer (1938–2025)

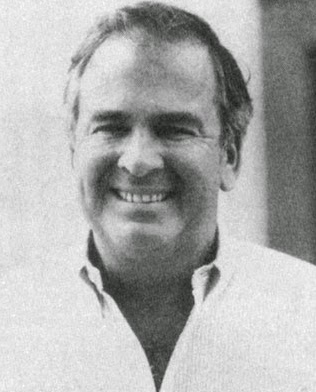
- Born: October 28, 1938; Hanford, California, U.S.
- Died: November 20, 2025 (aged 87); Long Beach, California, U.S.
- Education: California State University, Los Angeles (BA)
- Occupations: Television producer, screenwriter, activist, investigative journalist, LAPD Deputy Chief
- Notable work: Huffington Post, New York Magazine, L.A. Times, Beachcomber
- Television: MacGyver, T.J. Hooker, Kojak, Quincy, M.E., Knight Rider, F/X: The Series, Police Story
- Spouse: Adrienne Allen
- Children: (3) Michael P. Downing, Tambree Justice, Julie Davies

Stephen Downing (October 28, 1938 – November 20, 2025) was an American screenwriter, producer, activist and investigative journalist who began his screenwriting career in the 1960s while still working as a Los Angeles Police Department (LAPD) officer. Most of Downing's pre-1980 writing and producing credits appeared under pseudonyms to escape notice of the LAPD. Downing was active in the movement to end the international war on drugs and the militarization of police in America. In 2011, Downing became a board member of Law Enforcement Action Partnership, formerly known as Law Enforcement Against Prohibition (LEAP), after years representing the group as a speaker. He left the board in 2019, but was still an advisory board member who gave speeches and wrote op-ed pieces on behalf of the group. He also volunteered his time as an investigative journalist, with a focus on police corruption and reform, for a local print newspaper in Long Beach, California. As a television producer and screenwriter he is best known for the series Walking Tall, RoboCop: The Series, T. J. Hooker and MacGyver.

== Law enforcement career ==
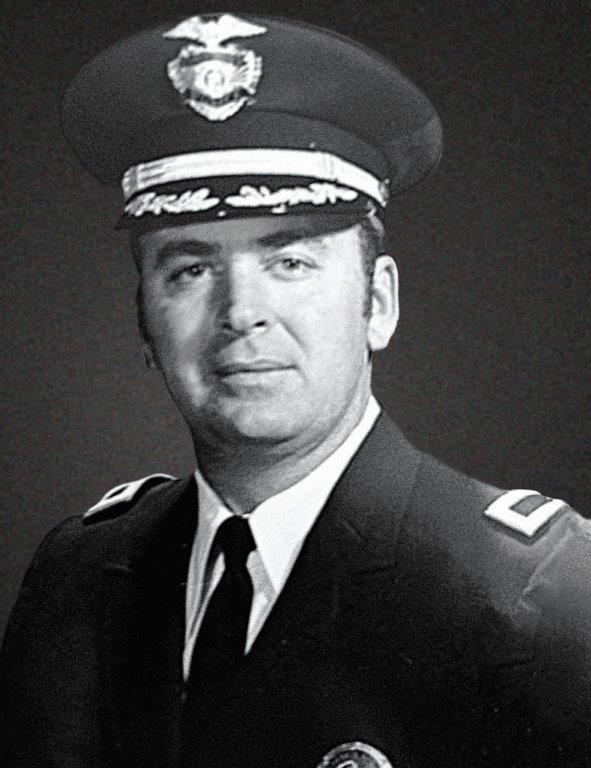
Downing's Official LAPD Photo

Downing retired from the LAPD in 1980 after more than 20 years of service, during which he saw firsthand the destructive nature of the war on drugs. Downing left his mark on the LAPD with many of his assignments. As Captain of Detectives, he established homicide investigation techniques still in use today. As Commanding Officer of Juvenile Division, he established and published a file that brought an end to abuses in state probation subsidy programs. As Commanding Officer of Southwest Area, he designed and implemented the first functionally integrated police operation in law enforcement aimed at combating gang activity, a program that became a national model. As a Commanding Officer of the Personnel and Training Bureau, he chaired the Shooting Review Board and provided the leadership to adopt the first use of force policy in the nation that had as its preamble a reverence for human life and its taking to be at last resort. Downing's son also served as an LAPD Deputy Chief. Michael P. Downing served as the Commanding Officer of Counter-Terrorism & Special Operations Bureau, and was interim Chief of Police after Chief William J. Bratton stepped down in 1990.

Since retirement, he has been an outspoken advocate to end both the militarization of police and the war on drugs.

== Activism against War on Drugs ==
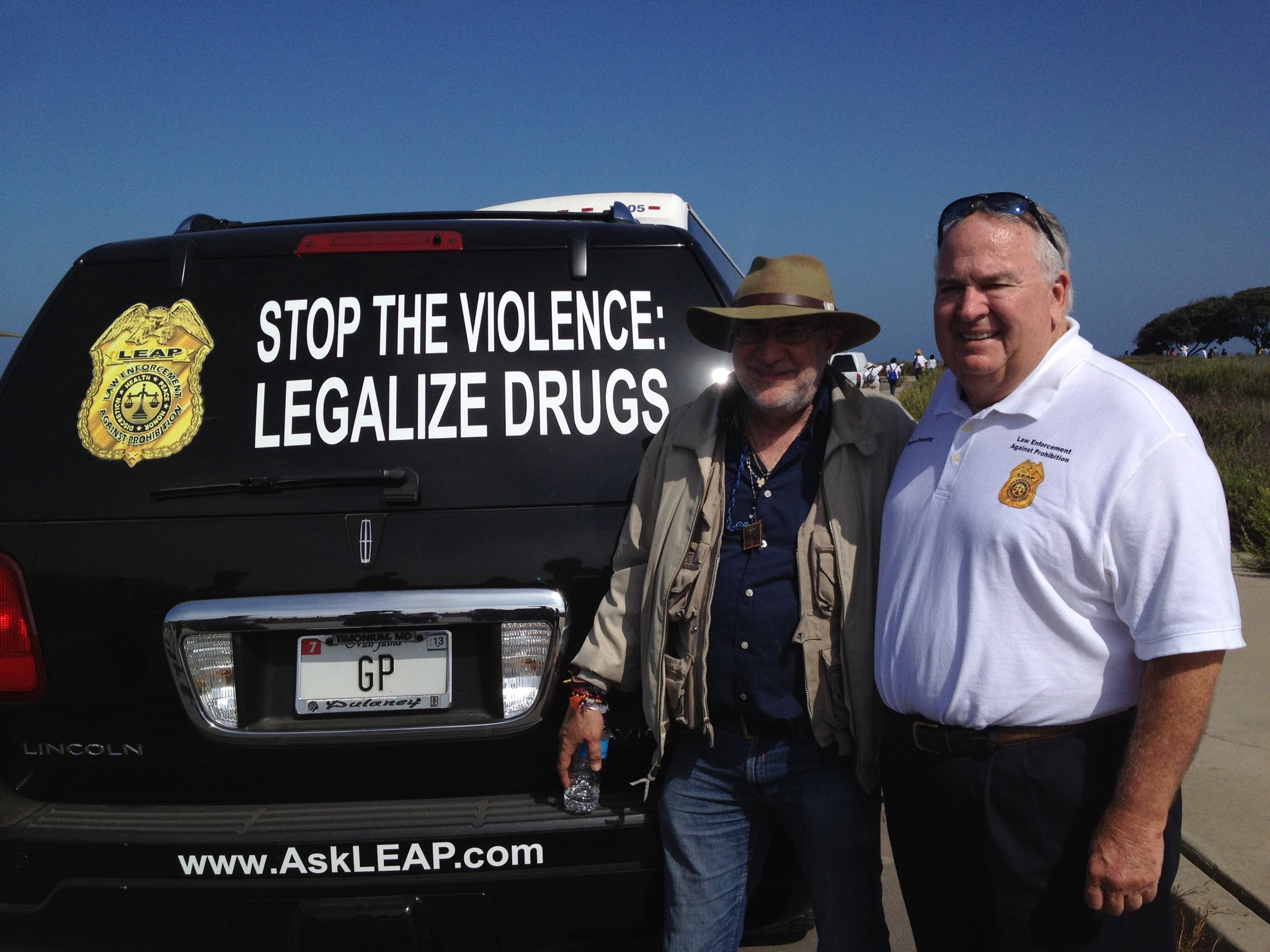
Downing (right) and Javier Sicilia, Caravan for Peace (2012)

Downing became opposed to the war on drugs after the death of a fellow officer in an undercover drug sting in 1973. Since then, the countless senseless deaths of civilians and officers from drug violence, and deaths of addicts who overdose due to impure and unpredictable street drugs, have cemented Downing's opposition to the drug war. He opposes the war on drugs not only due to its negative impact on minority communities, but also the drug war's corrupting influence on law enforcement. Downing believes the drug war is a distraction from law enforcement's true purpose, and has made police departments dependent on drug investigations as a source of funding obtained through civil assets forfeiture.

As LEAP board member, Downing took part in the 2012 Caravan for Peace; joining Mexican poet, novelist, and peace activist Javier Sicilia to raise awareness of the disastrous effects drug prohibition has had on both the U.S. and Mexico. Downing has written opinion pieces advocating for the end of the drug war in publications such as the Huffington Post, New York magazine, and the Los Angeles Times. After cannabis prohibition was ended in California, he served as a director, and later, for two years as chairman of the board of directors for Cannabis Sativa, Inc, a publicly traded cannabis corporation.

== Hollywood career ==
Downing's Hollywood credits include writing or producing credits on over 500 hours of television dating back to the 1965. His first Hollywood job was as a technical advisor on Adam-12, advising Jack Webb who would later buy Downing's first script for the TV show Dragnet. While an LAPD officer he used three screen names to stay off the department's radar. He used the pseudonyms Michael Donovan, Sean Baine, and Adrian Leeds for his screenwriting credits. As Michael Donovan, Downing wrote for ten shows, including episodes of Dragnet, Adam-12, Emergency!, and Police Story. As Sean Baine, he wrote for 16 shows, including Kojak, Quincy, M.E., Get Christie Love!, and The Streets of San Francisco. As Adrian Leeds, he wrote for five shows, including Baretta and Police Woman. Downing would write on weekends and his wife, Adrienne Allen, would deliver his scripts to producers.

After retiring from the LAPD, Downing began exclusively using his real name for television projects. Downing has served as executive producer/show-runner/writer on fourteen television shows as himself. His production credits include the series MacGyver, T. J. Hooker, Knight Rider, F/X: The Series, and RoboCop. He has written and produced numerous made-for-television movies and mini-series including Without Warning: Terror in the Tower (about the first bombing of the New York World Trade Center in 1993), Crisis in Mid-Air, Alone in the Neon Jungle, Command in Hell, and numerous projects adapting the novels of John Jakes. Additional writing-only credits under his real name include CHiPs, Nero Wolfe, Sierra, McClain's Law, and Walking Tall.

Downing was also featured as himself in many documentaries, including Legalize It, The Culture High, American Drug War 2: Cannabis Destiny, and With Justice and Dignity: A Caravan for Peace.

One of his later works, Hate Train, a screenplay about a Black female homicide detective who derails a murderous PAC supported white supremacist conspiracy launched from Palm Beach, Florida, was completed and taken to the production marketplace in May 2021.

He later worked on a screenplay about Shona Banda, a mother suffering from Crohn's Disease who became a victim of the state of Kansas' War on Cannabis.

=== Work on MacGyver ===
Downing worked on the show MacGyver since its first season in 1985, eventually serving as the executive producer/showrunner. Downing's wife, Adrienne Allen, served as show publicist and their daughter, Julie, acted in multiple episodes of the series. Downing was the supervising producer/"show-doctor"responsible for MacGyver's refusal to use a gun, a character trait he pushed for after he was brought in after the pilot episode (in which MacGyver used a gun). Downing became an advocate for curbing access to guns, especially handguns, after seeing the effects of gun violence firsthand as a police officer. He was a witness to the LAPD's role in perpetuation of that violence by auctioning off seized guns—only for those guns to subsequently be used in a crime. This position earned criticism, including a call from the National Rifle Association of America (NRA) to boycott MacGyver.

== Investigative journalism efforts ==
Downing lived in Long Beach, California, where he frequently published articles investigating the Long Beach Police Department.

Downing's investigative journalism efforts began after the LBPD shooting of Douglas Zerby by Long Beach police in 2010. The Los Angeles District Attorney declined to prosecute the shooting, but a subsequent civil case resulted in a $6.5 million judgement against the city. Downing did not take payment for his investigative journalism work, seeing it as a community service.

From 2010, Downing uncovered innumerable scandals at the Long Beach Police Department. His writings uncovered mismanagement, incompetence, corruption, abuse and financial fraud at LBPD. This work has received praise from the community, but also criticism from the LBPD and its supporters (including a death threat from a former LBPD officer).

In 2018, after developing a whistleblower source within the LBPD, Downing worked with the ACLU and Al Jazeera to uncover the LBPD's secret use of disappearing messaging app TigerText. Al Jazeera and Downing's publisher, the Long Beach Beachcomber, would publish simultaneous articles on the scandal on September 18, 2018—resulting in LBPD Chief of Police Robert Luna issuing an order that very day ending his department's use of the disappearing message app his department had been using for the last four years.

== Death ==
Downing died in Long Beach on November 20, 2025, at the age of 87, from sepsis.
