= List of Police Woman episodes =

This is a list of episodes for the television series Police Woman.

== Series overview ==
Season	Episodes	Originally released	
Season	Episodes	First released	Last released
Pilot		March 26, 1974	
1	22	September 13, 1974	March 14, 1975
2	24	September 12, 1975	March 2, 1976
3	23	September 28, 1976	March 22, 1977
4	22	October 25, 1977	March 30, 1978

== Episodes ==
=== Pilot (1974) ===
The pilot for this series was an episode of Police Story titled "The Gamble" (March 26, 1974), in which Angie Dickinson was introduced as a vice officer named Lisa Beaumont.

=== Season 1 (1974–75) ===
No. overall	No. in season	Title	Directed by	Written by	Original release date
1	1	"The End Game"	Alvin Ganzer	Mark Rodgers	September 13, 1974
Pepper (Angie Dickinson) and Crowley (Earl Holliman) pose as bank employees to nail a particularly vicious gang of bank robbers. Guest stars: Jonelle Allen, Linda Dano, Paul Burke, Susanne Benton, Skip Homeier, Bill Williams, John Howard and Vince Howard
2	2	"The Beautiful Die Young"	Barry Shear	Story by : Douglas Benton; Teleplay by : Edward DeBlasio	September 20, 1974
Pepper investigates a modeling school which is actually a front for supplying young girls to the porn business and overseas white slavery trade. Guest stars: William Windom, Kathleen Quinlan, Karen Lamm, Judy Canova, Harvey Jason, Antonio Fargas and Cathy Rigby
3	3	"Warning: All Wives..."	Arnold Laven	Edward DeBlasio	September 27, 1974
Pepper and Bill go undercover to catch a rapist/killer who is targeting the wives of patients at a hospital. Guest stars: Elinor Donahue, Joyce Bulifant, William Katt, Don Stroud, Martha Scott, Robert F. Simon, Joan Tompkins and Joan Darling
4	4	"Seven-Eleven"	Richard Benedict	Frank Telford	October 4, 1974
Pepper goes undercover and impersonates an airline stewardess who is a link in a complex heroin smuggling chain. Guest star: Larry Hagman, John Larch, Chuck McCann, Karen Carlson, Albert Popwell, Charles Bateman and Dick Miller
5	5	"Anatomy of Two Rapes"	Barry Shear	Richard M. Bluel & Pat Fielder	October 11, 1974
Pepper and the squad investigate a pair of alleged rapes. The first involves a wealthy woman who claims that she was attacked a week before her daughter's wedding. The second involves the rape and murder of a married woman, who was known for being very promiscuous. Guest stars: Angel Tompkins, Rhonda Fleming, Pat Morita, Philip Carey, Hal Williams, Don "Red" Barry, Eddie Firestone, Jack Riley, C. Lindsay Workman and Darrell Zwerling
6	6	"It's Only a Game"	Leonard Horn	Story by : Gregory K. Scott; Teleplay by : David Dugan	October 25, 1974
Squad veterans question whether their newest member really wants the job or is being pushed into it by his father, a retired detective. Guest star: Patrick Wayne, Philip Michael Thomas, Dane Clark and Ed Prentiss
7	7	"Fish"	Bernard McEveety	Frank Telford	November 1, 1974
Pepper goes undercover in a woman's prison to gain the confidence of a fellow prisoner who has information that could put away a mobster. Guest star: Marian Mercer, Conny Van Dyke, Morgan Woodward and Joyce Brothers
8	8	"Flowers of Evil"	Alexander Singer	Story by : Joshua Hanke; Teleplay by : John W. Bloch	November 8, 1974
Pepper goes undercover as a nurse-on-the-run to gain employment at an old folks' home where the female patients are being murdered for their checks by a trio of homicidal lesbians. Guest stars: Laraine Stephens, Fay Spain, Lynn Loring, Meg Wyllie, Florence Lake, Elizabeth Kerr and Garry Walberg
9	9	"The Stalking of Joey Marr"	Bernard McEveety	Irving Gaynor Neiman	November 22, 1974
Pepper must transfer the son of a murdered gang chief from Mexico to testify against a killer. Guest star: Monte Markham, Pepper Martin, John Crawford, Phillip Terry and Stephen Manley
10	10	"Requiem for Bored Wives"	Alvin Ganzer	Irving Elman	November 29, 1974
A freewheeling disc jockey finds his wife murdered in her bed. Guest stars: Bob Crane, Della Reese, E. J. Peaker, Lance LeGault, Jane Merrow and Melendy Britt
11	11	"Smack"	John Newland	Richard M. Bluel & Pat Fielder	December 6, 1974
Pepper goes undercover as a high school teacher to hunt down a group of drug pushers. Guest stars: William Shatner, Brenda Sykes, Barry Livingston, Robert Sampson, Smokey Robinson, Jamie Donnelly, Anne Seymour and Ray Vitte
12	12	"The Cradle Robbers"	Richard Benedict	Larry Brody	December 13, 1974
A search for a missing granddaughter of Sergeant Crowley's old friend leads Pepper to an adoption racket in which children are bought and sold. Guest star: John Vernon, Cliff Emmich, Sharon Farrell, Arlene Golonka, Douglas Fowley, Harry Bartell, Judy Lewis and Kyle Richards
13	13	"Shoefly"	Alvin Ganzer	Story by : Joshua Hanke & Dan Ullman; Teleplay by : Edward DeBlasio	December 20, 1974
Internal Affairs gives Pepper and Crowley 72 hours to find the cop who switched barrels on a murder weapon before the accused killer got to court. Guest star: Ed Nelson, Audrey Dalton, David White, Rory Calhoun, Annette O'Toole, Robyn Hilton and Phillip Pine
14	14	"Target Black"	Charles S. Dubin	Irving Gaynor Neiman	January 3, 1975
Pepper serves as bodyguard for a visiting campus speaker who, being black and Marxist, is a magnet for threats from hate groups. Guest star: Ruby Dee, Warren Stevens, Pervis Atkins, Mary Alice and Robert Ginty
15	15	"Sidewinder"	Reza Badiyi	Story by : Gregory K. Scott; Teleplay by : Richard M. Bluel	January 17, 1975
Four Korean War vets armed with M-16s and a bazooka prepare to pull off Operation: Sidewinder, a heist of an armored car carrying a multi-million dollar payload. One of the men's penchant for prostitutes puts Pepper in the action undercover. Guest stars: Glenn Corbett, John P. Ryan, Ron Masak, Geoffrey Lewis, Lara Parker, Bill Dana and Milton Selzer
16	16	"Blast"	Alvin Ganzer	Chester Krumholtz	January 24, 1975
The deaths of a prominent politician and a nightclub dancer in a car explosion send Pepper to work as a go-go dancer for the club's owner, a one-time poor boy with a powerful yen for the finer things in life. Guest star: Robert Vaughn, Laraine Stephens, George Murdock, Joyce Jillson and Ned Romero
17	17	"No Place to Hide"	Leonard Horn	Sean Baine	January 31, 1975
A clue is found linking a series of seemingly random murders: Each victim had testified against the mob and was now enjoying a new life in the Witness Protection Program. Pepper goes undercover as a secretary to uncover the leaker. Guest stars: Mark Harmon, David Selby, Katherine Justice, Gordon Jump, Stephen Young and Tom Rosqui
18	18	"Nothing Left to Lose"	Alexander Singer	Story by : Shimon Wincelberg; Teleplay by : Douglas Benton & Edward DeBlasio	February 14, 1975
Pepper's informant is LaRue Collins, a mentally unstable masseuse whose work allows her to overhear mobsters plotting crimes. But now her cover is blown and she is running for her life. Guest stars: Patty Duke, John Astin, Patricia Barry, Kathleen Lloyd, Lee Paul, Naomi Stevens and Victor Sen Yung
19	19	"The Company"	Alvin Ganzer	Gregory K. Scott	February 21, 1975
Three gangland killings signal that someone is taking over established vice activities. A gambling operator is feeling the heat, and Pepper is there to help. Guest stars: Shelley Berman, Paula Kelly, Rick Jason, Kaz Garas, Johnny Seven and Frank de Kova
20	20	"Ice"	David Moessinger	Story by : E. Arthur Kean; Teleplay by : David Moessinger	February 28, 1975
Posing as a couple of jewel fences, Pepper and Crowley travel to Masiaca, Mexico as part of a complex plan to nab a gang of diamond thieves. Guest star: Michael Parks, James Keach, Ned Glass, Jane Elliot, William Campbell, Florence Halop and René Enríquez
21	21	"Bloody Nose"	Leonard Horn	Shimon Wincelberg	March 7, 1975
While working undercover as a waitress in a seedy roadside diner connected to a series of truckload heists, Pepper finds herself entangled in the ugly spousal abuse dispute between a young married couple in her apartment complex. Guest star: David Birney, Joan Goodfellow, Jack Soo, Joe Kapp, Joyce Jameson and Eddie Egan
22	22	"The Loner"	John Newland	Burton Armus	March 14, 1975
Pepper is strangely fascinated by a ruggedly individualistic ex-cop who works as a bodyguard and is antagonizing both the police and the gangster who is after his client. Guest stars: Don Meredith, Neville Brand, Pepper Martin, Robert Phillips and Pat Harrington Jr.

=== Season 2 (1975–76) ===
No. overall	No. in season	Title	Directed by	Written by	Original release date
23	1	"Pawns of Power"	Barry Shear	Sean Baine	September 12, 1975
Pepper investigates an illegal gambling operation whose owners are also suspected of counterfeiting. Guest stars: Roddy McDowall, Robert Goulet and Sydney Chaplin
24	2	"The Score"	Barry Crane	Gabe Essoe	September 19, 1975
A drug pusher's sale of particularly potent speed causes several overdose deaths, and creates an emotional crisis for the criminal's guilt-ridden girlfriend. Guest stars: Michael Constantine, Paul Koslo, Christopher Stone, Frank Aletter and Olivia Cole
25	3	"Paradise Mall"	Alvin Ganzer	Frank Telford	September 26, 1975
A detective's wife is the latest of a killer's victims, who are all blondes and whose corpses are adorned with wedding veils. Guest star: Bruce Boxleitner, James Wainwright, Ned Romero and Gavan O'Herlihy
26	4	"Pattern for Evil"	John Newland	Edward DeBlasio	October 3, 1975
Pepper goes undercover as a fashion consultant when a designer loses more than just designs. Guest stars: Rick Lenz, Janet Margolin, Harold J. Stone, Ron Soble, Logan Ramsey, Deborah Pratt and Charlie Brill
27	5	"The Chasers"	Barry Shear	Irve Tunick	October 10, 1975
A group of con artists who prey on car crash victims choose the wrong patsy — Pepper, who awakens in the hospital after being knocked unconscious by a speeding car. Guest stars: Ida Lupino, Ian McShane, Paul Benjamin, John Smith, Edward Andrews, Berlinda Tolbert and Vivian Bonnell
28	6	"Cold Wind"	Alexander Singer	Ralph L. Kelly	October 17, 1975
Suspicion for the murder of two factory employees falls on two co-workers: a compulsive gambler who had a fight with one of the victims, and an enigmatic college student who disappeared on the night of the crime. Guest stars: Kenneth Mars, John Quade, Lee Delano and Alix Talton
29	7	"Above and Beyond"	Alexander Singer	Elroy Schwartz	October 31, 1975
After a parole officer is murdered, Pepper goes undercover as a parolee to find out why and how he was killed. Guest star: Peter Brown, Andrew Parks, Robert Sampson, Richard Venture, Audrey Dalton, Jonelle Allen, Pat Renella, David S. Cass Sr. and Rafael Campos
30	8	"Farewell, Mary Jane"	Douglas Benton	Gregory K. Scott	November 4, 1975
Pepper engineers a major drug purchase to help capture a police informant turned drug dealer. Guest stars: Sam Elliott, Geoffrey Lewis, Charles Bateman, Lance LeGault and Loni Anderson
31	9	"Blaze of Glory"	Barry Shear	Shimon Wincelberg	November 11, 1975
While posing as a prostitute, Pepper is taken hostage by a glory-seeking, bank-robbing couple. Guest stars: Don Stroud, Nellie Bellflower, William Lucking, Phil Leeds and Read Morgan
32	10	"Glitter with a Bullet"	John Newland	S.S. Schweitzer	November 18, 1975
While investigating the death of a well-known musician, Pepper becomes involved with a confused young rock star and his ruthless manager. Guest star: John Rubinstein, Frank Gorshin, Robbie Lee, Nita Talbot, Olivia Cole and Commander Cody and His Lost Planet Airmen
33	11	"The Purge"	Alvin Ganzer	Burton Armus	November 25, 1975
Pepper goes undercover to clear Crowley, who is suspended for killing a teenager, and find out the real reason behind the attack. Guest stars: David Huddleston, Tige Andrews, Bert Remsen, Don "Red" Barry, Stephen Pearlman, Rick Jason, Hayden Rorke and Lee Paul
34	12	"Don't Feed the Pigeons"	Herschel Daugherty	Story by : Joshua Hanke & John W. Bloch; Teleplay by : John W. Bloch	December 2, 1975
When an old woman is killed for her possessions, Sgt. Pepper and the crew find that a group is using "the oldest trick in the book" to fool grannies out of their money. Guest stars: Jeanette Nolan, Erik Estrada, Joyce Jameson, Henry Gibson, Vonetta McGee, Sondra Currie, Lieux Dressler and Alice Frost
35	13	"The Hit"	David Moessinger	David Moessinger	December 9, 1975
A boxer's life hangs by a thread as a hitman, who had failed to get him the first time, must finish the job or his employers will finish him off. Guest stars: Amy Irving, Harris Yulin, Fay Spain, Cliff Emmich, Geoffrey Horne, Eddie Egan and Conny Van Dyke
36	14	"Silence"	Barry Shear	Edward DeBlasio	October 24, 1975
When a woman goes missing, her mute sister tries to find her, accusing the missing woman's husband of foul play. Guest stars: Joanna Pettet, George Murdock, Robert Webber and Buddy Lester
37	15	"Incident Near a Black and White"	Herschel Daugherty	Gregory K. Scott	December 23, 1975
Working under an ambitious Lieutenant with no street experience, Pepper and team go out in search of a cop killer. Guest stars: Don Galloway, Chu Chu Malave, Ned Romero, Paulene Myers and Susan Blanchard
38	16	"The Melting Point of Ice"	Robert Vaughn	Shimon Wincelberg	January 6, 1976
A robbery goes wrong and the situation becomes more complicated when the stolen diamonds go missing. Suspicion centers on a construction site, and Pepper goes undercover as a caterer to try and discover who at the site has the diamonds. Guest star: Carmine Caridi, Charles Frank, Tom Reese, Paul Lambert, Jason Wingreen, Joan Tetzel and Kieu Chinh
39	17	"The Pawn Shop"	Richard Benedict	Story by : S.S. Schweitzer & Gregory K. Scott; Teleplay by : S.S. Schweitzer	January 20, 1976
Pepper goes undercover to catch a burglar dealing in high grade antiques through a pawnshop. Guest star: Joan Collins, Diane Baker, Rick Segall, Phillip Pine and John Dennis Johnston
40	18	"Angela"	Alvin Ganzer	Irving Pearlberg	December 16, 1975
When the boyfriend of a drug dealer's daughter is framed, the team investigates. Guest stars: Joseph Campanella, Brooke Adams, Pepper Martin and Scott Hylands
41	19	"Wednesday's Child"	Barry Shear	Sean Baine	February 3, 1976
A cat burglar and a nightclub singer are enlisted to break up a burglary ring that preys on wealthy single women. Guest stars: Paula Kelly, Robert Loggia, Edd Byrnes, Audrey Christie, Les McCann, Raymond St. Jacques and Helen Martin
42	20	"Generation of Evil"	Corey Allen	Stanley Roberts	February 10, 1976
Pepper goes undercover in Las Vegas to find the kidnapped grandson of an elderly millionaire. Guest stars: Robert Vaughn, Antony Carbone, Barry Williams, Penny Santon, Sherwood Price, David Opatoshu, Carmen Argenziano and Kevin Hagen
43	21	"Double Image"	Barry Shear	Joseph Polizzi	February 17, 1976
Royster falls in love with a key witness he is tasked to protect in a murder trial. Guest stars: Catherine Burns, Lucille Benson and Dane Clark
44	22	"Mother Love"	John Newland	Max Hodge	February 24, 1976
A young woman who is mentally disturbed kidnaps the child she gave up at birth. Guest star: Donna Mills, Barry Brown, Brooke Bundy and Clifford David
45	23	"Task Force: Cop Killer: Parts 1 and 2"	Barry Shear	Douglas Benton & Edward DeBlasio	March 2, 1976
46	24	"Task Force: Cop Killer: Parts 1 and 2"	Barry Shear	Douglas Benton & Edward DeBlasio	March 2, 1976
While training with a motorcycle task force to prove women can be effective motorcycle cops, Pepper falls for a smooth talker. Pepper is in search of the persons responsible for her boyfriend's "accident" while he hovers near death. Guest stars: James Darren, Cynthia Sikes Yorkin, Cooper Huckabee, Dane Clark, Charles Haid, Gerald McRaney and Don Stroud

=== Season 3 (1976–77) ===
No. overall	No. in season	Title	Directed by	Written by	Original release date
47	1	"The Trick Book: Parts 1 and 2"	Barry Shear	Douglas Benton & Edward DeBlasio	September 28, 1976
48	2	"The Trick Book: Parts 1 and 2"	Barry Shear	Douglas Benton & Edward DeBlasio	September 28, 1976
An influential banker informs the police that he is being blackmailed by Madame Hilary La Salle, operator of a very classy brothel. Apparently, she has been keeping a little black book — her "trick book" — containing details of all her clients. When Madame DeSalle is found murdered and the "trick book" goes missing, Pepper Anderson and Bill Crowley are called in to investigate. Guest stars: Joan Collins and Dorothy Malone
49	3	"Tender Soldier"	Corey Allen	Scott Swanton	October 5, 1976
Pepper poses as a revolutionary to nab the terrorist who murdered a police officer.
50	4	"Trial by Prejudice"	Barry Shear	Sean Baine	October 12, 1976
Pepper, suspended from duty, faces a departmental trial when a suspect claims that Pepper sexually molested her at the time of her arrest. Guest star: Carol Lynley
51	5	"Sara Who?"	Jerry London	Douglas Benton & Edward DeBlasio	October 26, 1976
While hunting the murderer of a police woman, Sgts. Pepper Anderson and Bill Crowley learn that a second police woman has been savagely attacked. Guest star: Meredith Baxter
52	6	"Broken Angels"	Corey Allen	Kenneth Peters	November 9, 1976
The victim of a murder attempt arranged to look like a drunk-driving crash is an officer with a drinking problem. Guest star: Anne Francis, Robert Walden as Spider Denton
53	7	"Brainwash"	John Newland	Rudolph Borchert	November 16, 1976
Pepper poses as an investigative news reporter to probe the private school where several teenagers have mysteriously died.
54	8	"The Lifeline Agency"	Corey Allen	Gabe Essoe	November 23, 1976
Pepper and Crowley pose as a wealthy couple anxious to negotiate with a baby-selling operation.
55	9	"Tennis Bum"	Alvin Ganzer	Gregory K. Scott	November 30, 1976
Pepper is working undercover on a syndicate case, and becomes romantically involved with a tennis pro; what she does not realize is that he is an undercover cop as well.
56	10	"Bait"	David Moessinger	David Moessinger	December 7, 1976
A rapist whose latest victim was a college girl is sought by Pepper and Crowley. Guest star: Bruce Davison
57	11	"The Death of a Dream"	Douglas Benton	Shimon Wincelberg	December 14, 1976
Pepper Anderson, as well as a city councilman and his masseuse, is held hostage by terrorists. Guest star: Sharon Farrell
58	12	"Father to the Man"	John Newland	Sheridan Gibney and Katrin Jaye	December 21, 1976
A young girl who witnessed a murder becomes the target of two gangsters who meant to kill her father. Guest star: Kim Richards
59	13	"Once a Snitch"	Alvin Ganzer	Sean Baine	January 4, 1977
Bernie Casey guest stars as P.J. Johnson. Pepper poses as a prostitute to learn why an attempt was made on the life of the new chief of police.
60	14	"Night of the Full Moon"	Alvin Ganzer	Don Balluck	January 11, 1977
Pepper is the decoy in a strategy to capture a schizophrenic young man who strangles middle-aged women. Guest star: Lisa Hartman Black
61	15	"Banker's Hours"	John Newland	Daniel B. Ullman	January 18, 1977
Pepper is on the trail of a gang of lady bank robbers. Guest star: Mariette Hartley
62	16	"Disco Killer"	Ernest Pintoff	Stanley Roberts	January 25, 1977
Pepper assumes the identity of a woman who was shot during a record-company executive's murder. Guest star: Ruth Roman
63	17	"Shadow of a Doubt"	Alf Kjellin	Daniel B. Ullman	February 1, 1977
Styles is suspected of complicity in the killing of his former girlfriend.
64	18	"The Killer Cowboys"	Alexander Singer	Edward DeBlasio	February 8, 1977
Pepper renews her romance with a test pilot, and she and Crowley pursue homicidal thieves who dress as cowboys.
65	19	"Shark"	John Newland	Rudolph Borchert	February 15, 1977
A loan-shark operation terrorizes borrowers to collect bad debts.
66	20	"Solitaire"	Douglas Benton	Gregory K. Scott	February 22, 1977
Pepper comes to the aid of an officer who is trying to recapture a cop killer that escaped while in his custody.
67	21	"Bondage"	Arnold Laven	Irv Pearlberg & Frank Telford	March 1, 1977
Pepper assumes the role of a porn queen after a hardcore porn film actress is murdered.
68	22	"Silky Chamberlain"	Barry Shear	Douglas Benton & Edward DeBlasio	March 8, 1977
Con men relieve Crowley's gullible uncle of his life's savings. Guest star: Cheryl Ladd
69	23	"Deadline: Death"	John Newland	Gregory K. Scott	March 22, 1977
After a reporter is killed by a car bomb, the man's son begins a search for his father's murderer.

=== Season 4 (1977–78) ===
No. overall	No. in season	Title	Directed by	Written by	Original release date
70	1	"Do You Still Beat Your Wife?"	Corey Allen	Edward DeBlasio	October 25, 1977
Undercover cop Pepper Anderson and partner Bill Crowley aid a battered wife who refuses to press charges against her brutal husband. Guest star: Dee Wallace
71	2	"Guns"	Alvin Ganzer	Burton Armus	November 1, 1977
Pepper sets herself up as a target by offering Congressional testimony against an international gun-running operation. Guest stars: Nipsey Russell, Bill Williams and Adam West
72	3	"Means to an End"	John Newland	Sean Baine	November 8, 1977
Pepper infiltrates a college drug ring to learn who is supplying cheap but lethal downers to students.
73	4	"The Inside Connection"	John Newland	Frank Telford	November 22, 1977
Pepper poses as a prisoner to find the killer of a rookie policewoman who was investigation a drug operation in the women's county jail. Guest star: Jayne Kennedy
74	5	"Screams"	David Moessinger	David Moessinger	December 6, 1977
A demented rapist-murderer is preying on hitchhikers. Guest stars: Audrey Landers and Rich Little
75	6	"The Buttercup Killer"	Michael Mann	Gabe Essoe	December 13, 1977
A killer attired in a nun's habit is slaying members of a Greek family, leaving only a dried buttercup as a clue.
76	7	"Merry Christmas Waldo"	E. Arthur Kean	E. Arthur Kean	December 14, 1977
An elderly Santa Claus robs banks using trickery, to assure his indigent friends a merry Christmas. This is a remake of a first-season episode of Police Story, with a different outcome.
77	8	"Death Game"	John Newland	Don Balluck	December 21, 1977
Pepper is driven to the brink of a nervous collapse by an unidentified assailant threatening her life. Guest star: Danny DeVito
78	9	"Ambition"	Virgil W. Vogel	Adrian Leeds	December 28, 1977
An overzealous detective becomes implicated in an extortion scam. Guest star: Paul Williams
79	10	"Blind Terror"	Virgil W. Vogel	Douglas Benton & Edward DeBlasio	January 4, 1978
It is a case of mistaken identity when criminals kidnap Pepper, thinking she is married to an accountant who uncovered payoffs from a criminal syndicate. Guest stars: Sandra Dee, Tab Hunter, Edie Adams, and Sid Haig
80	11	"Tigress"	Douglas Benton	Max Hodge	January 11, 1978
Pepper resents her assignment to protect an unscrupulous former classmate who is now a political candidate. Guest star: Eartha Kitt
81	12	"Sunset"	David Moessinger	Kenette Gfeller	January 18, 1978
In the midst of the investigation into the death of a race car driver, Crowley and his dying ex-wife seek reconciliation. Guest star: Alice Ghostley
82	13	"The Young and the Fair"	Corey Allen	Irv Pearlberg	January 25, 1978
A local professor may be involved with a white slavery racket, so Pepper goes undercover as a college student.
83	14	"The Human Rights of Tiki Kim"	Virgil W. Vogel	Jackson Gillis	February 1, 1978
A young girl from Korea is abducted and held to prevent her from talking about the murder she witnessed.
84	15	"Sixth Sense"	David Moessinger	Jack M. Casey & David Moessinger	February 8, 1978
Crowley discovers a woman near death in a car trunk, but the driver — her assailant — is freed on a technicality. Guest stars: Juliet Mills, Barbara McNair, and Phyllis Davis
85	16	"Sons"	Richard Benedict	Edward DeBlasio	February 15, 1978
A rookie cop is beaten and a man tells the police what he knows about it, only to have his son murdered. Guest stars: Robert Englund and Kathleen Freeman
86	17	"Murder with Pretty People"	John Newland	Max Hodge	February 22, 1978
A model agency owner, who was not a popular person to begin with, is murdered, sending Pepper undercover as a fashion model to find the killer. Guest stars: Morgan Fairchild and Anne Francis
87	18	"Battered Teachers"	Alvin Ganzer	Daniel Benton	March 1, 1978
Teachers are being terrorized at a high school by local area hoods, so Pepper goes back to school to go after them. Guest stars: Debra Winger and Mare Winningham
88	19	"A Shadow on the Sea"	Alvin Ganzer	Jack M. Casey	March 8, 1978
Pepper, a waterfront cop and an old sea dog go after two boat hijackers who murdered a honeymooning couple and seem willing to steal and kill more to set up a smuggling operation. Guest star: Catherine Bach
89	20	"Sweet Kathleen"	Douglas Benton	Sean Baine	March 15, 1978
Guest star Craig Stevens as Saunders. A woman tells Crowley a story of how she knew the details about a robbery but was forced to keep those facts to herself or face the consequences.
90	21	"Flip of a Coin"	George Lehr	Jack M. Casey	March 23, 1978
Styles's wife is facing surgery and he's having trouble concentrating on a kidnapping case. Guest star: Gary Collins
91	22	"Good Old Uncle Ben"	Larry Stewart	Daniel B. Ullman	March 30, 1978
An old friend of Pepper's gets drawn into a cattle stealing scheme. Guest stars:Keenan Wynn, Bettye Ackerman
