= David Brown (police officer) =

Former Superintendent of the Chicago Police Department

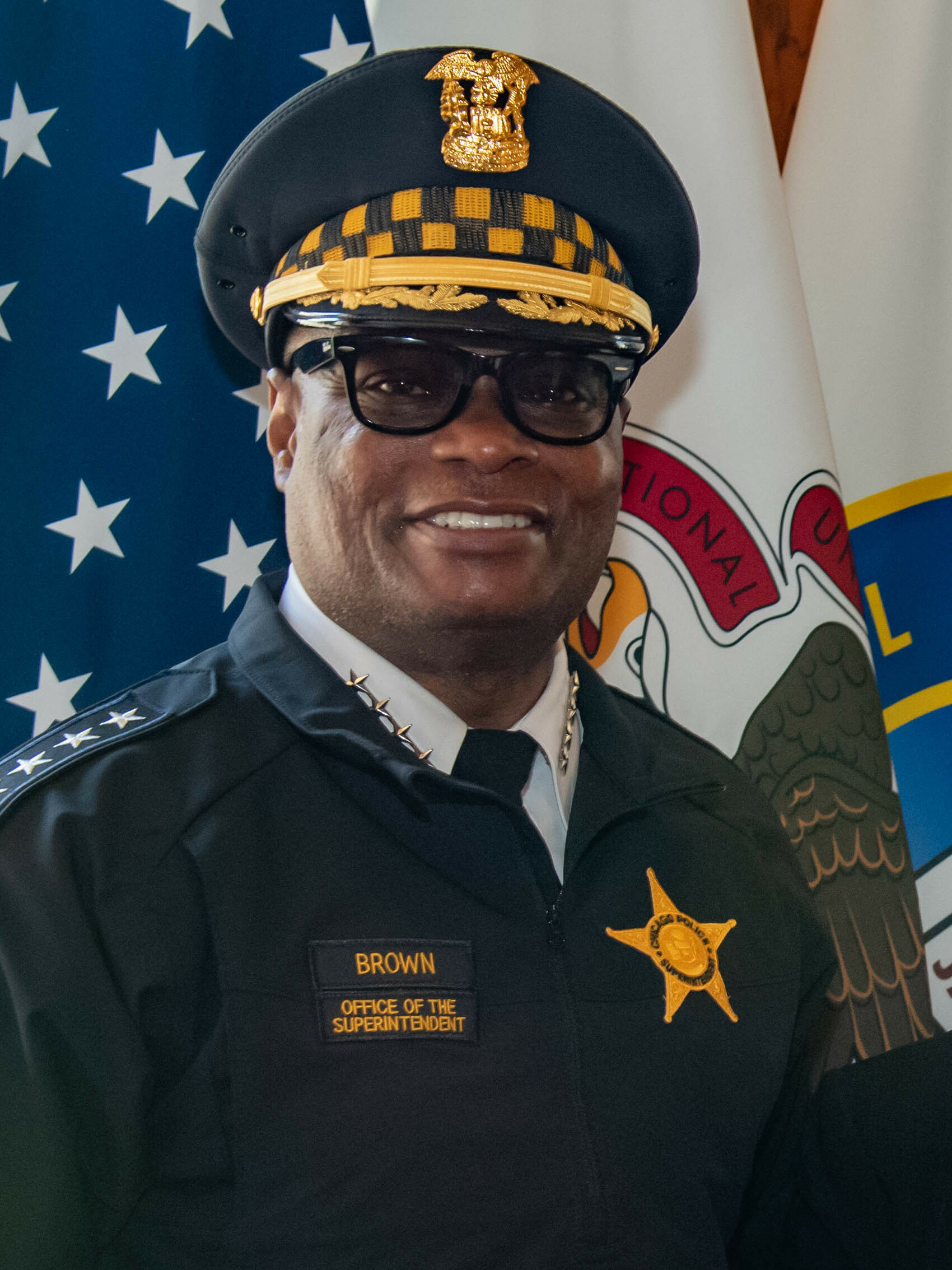
- Brown in 2022

63rd Superintendent of the Chicago Police Department
- In office April 15, 2020 – March 16, 2023; Acting: April 15, 2020 – April 22, 2020
- Mayor: Lori Lightfoot
- Preceded by: Eddie T. Johnson; Charlie Beck (interim)
- Succeeded by: Larry Snelling; Eric Carter (interim)

28th Chief of the Dallas Police Department
- In office May 4, 2010 – October 4, 2016
- Preceded by: David Kunkle
- Succeeded by: Reneé Hall

Personal details
- Born: David O'Neal Brown; September 18, 1960 (age 65) Dallas, Texas, U.S.
- Education: University of Texas, Austin; Dallas Baptist University (BS); Amberton University (MBA)

David O'Neal Brown (born September 18, 1960) is an American former law enforcement administrator. He served as the 63rd superintendent of the Chicago Police Department in Illinois from 2020 to 2023 and as the chief of the Dallas Police Department in Texas from 2010 to 2016.

== Education ==
A Dallas native, Brown is a graduate of South Oak Cliff High School and attended the University of Texas at Austin before enrolling in the Dallas police academy, originally with the intention of becoming a prosecutor. He earned a Bachelor of Science from Dallas Baptist University, in 1999 and an MBA from Amberton University, in 2001 and graduated from the FBI National Academy and the FBI National Executive Institute, the Senior Management Institute for Police, the National Counter-Terrorism Seminar in Tel Aviv, and the United States Secret Service dignitary protection seminar. He is certified by the State of Texas as a master peace officer and a police instructor.

== Career ==
=== Dallas Police Department ===
==== Early tenure ====
After joining the Dallas Police Department in 1983, Brown worked in patrol divisions, SWAT, and internal affairs. He became first assistant chief of police in 2005; in 2007–08, he served as assistant city manager.

==== Chief of police ====
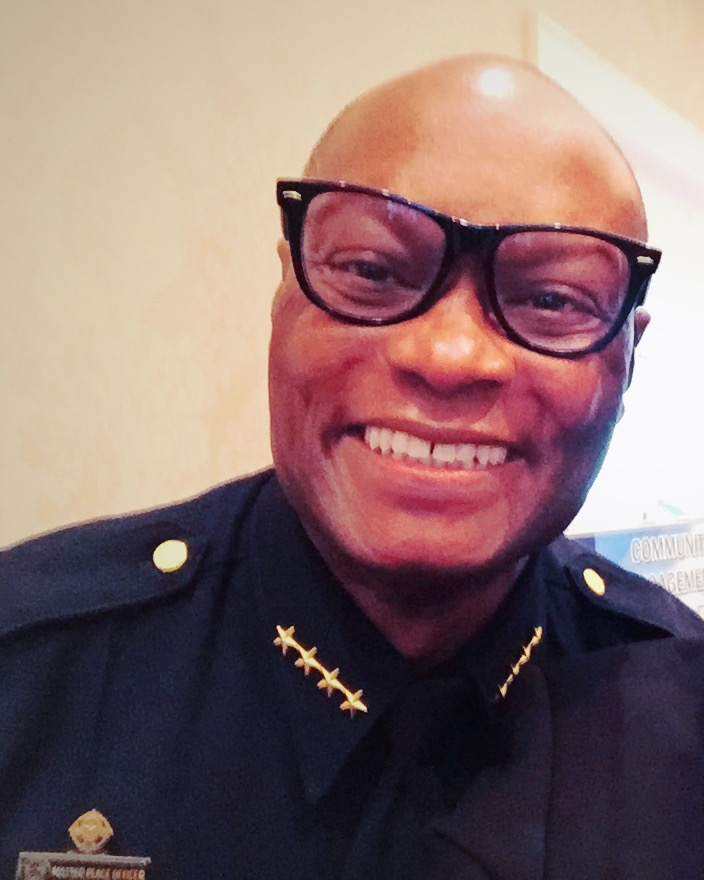
Brown in 2015

Brown was appointed police chief in April 2010 and sworn into office on May 4, 2010.

The New York Times reported that Brown has "earned a national reputation as a progressive leader whose top priority is improving relations and reducing distrust between the police department and the city’s minority residents." He has advocated reducing the use of force and discouraged chasing suspects in cars and even by foot, since such chases often lead to fatalities. According to published reporting, he also has a reputation as a "tough boss" and has fought with the local police union over his emphasis on less-confrontational strategies and his willingness to fire officers, often publicly. He has also sought to increase transparency by equipping officers with body cameras and sought to reform training on the use of lethal force. It has also been reported that some African American residents still feel they are subject to discrimination by the police.

Brown was chief during the 2016 shooting of Dallas police officers that killed five police officers and injured nine others and two civilians. He made the choice to use C-4 explosive delivered by a robot to kill the shooter, Micah Xavier Johnson, who was heavily armed and secured behind a brick corner with no safe way for police to rush Johnson or reach him with a sniper. The killing of Johnson was the first time in United States history a robot was used by police to deliver lethal force against a suspect.

Brown received praise for reforms that were designed to reduce violent confrontations between police officers and the community and increase the department's accountability and transparency. However, he was also criticized by the local police union for the methods through which he implemented of some policies.

On September 1, 2016, Brown announced that he would be retiring from the Dallas Police Department on October 22, 2016. Despite being the longest serving police chief in recent decades, he gave no reason for his retirement only about 7 weeks after the Dallas police shootings, but the mayor and city manager both said that he was not forced out of office. Brown subsequently moved up his retirement date to October 4, 2016, to better coordinate dates with an upcoming pension board meeting.

External videos
- Presentation by Brown on Called to Rise, June 1, 2017, C-SPAN

In 2017 Brown's memoir, Called To Rise: A Life in Faithful Service to the Community That Made Me, was published by Ballantine Books.

=== Chicago Police Department ===
On April 2, 2020, Brown was nominated to be Superintendent of the Chicago Police Department by Chicago Mayor Lori Lightfoot. He took over as acting Superintendent on April 15, after his predecessor Charlie Beck, who held the position on an interim basis after the dismissal of Eddie T. Johnson, stepped down. His nomination was unanimously approved by Chicago City Council and he was sworn in on April 22.

Brown was a controversial superintendent throughout his tenure in Chicago. One day after Chicago mayor Lori Lightfoot's defeat in the first round of the 2023 Chicago mayoral election, Brown announced that he would be resigning as superintendent of the Chicago Police Department effective March 16, 2023. All of Lightfoot's opponents had vowed to fire Brown if elected. Brown will be returning to Dallas upon his resignation to take a position with a private law firm.

== Personal life ==
Brown is married to former Dallas police sergeant Cedonia Brown. In 1988, his police academy classmate, U.S Army veteran of the Vietnam War, and former partner Walter Williams was fatally shot in the line of duty. In 1991, his younger brother, Kelvin, was killed by drug dealers in the Phoenix area.

On June 20, 2010, his 27-year-old son, David Brown Jr., who suffered from bipolar disorder and had only a minor prior record involving a marijuana arrest, shot and killed 23-year-old Jeremy McMillian and 37-year-old Lancaster, Texas, police officer Craig Shaw. Brown was fatally shot more than a dozen times in the ensuing shootout with officers responding to the scene. The Dallas County medical examiner's autopsy reported the presence of PCP in Brown's bloodstream.
