= Michael Downing =

Michael Downing may refer to:

- Michael Downing (director), Canadian film director (Clean Rite Cowboy, Why Don't You Dance?)
- Michael Downing (politician), former state legislator in New Hampshire
- Michael Downing (writer), American writer (Perfect Agreement, Breakfast with Scot)
- Michael P. Downing, former chief of the Los Angeles Police Department
