= Charlie Beck =

American former police chief in Los Angeles (born 1953)

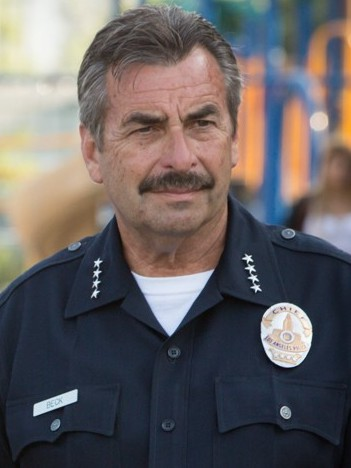
- Beck in 2014

Superintendent of the Chicago Police Department
- Interim
- In office December 2, 2019 – April 15, 2020
- Mayor: Lori Lightfoot
- Preceded by: Eddie T. Johnson
- Succeeded by: David Brown

Chief of Police of Los Angeles
- In office November 17, 2009 – June 27, 2018
- Mayor: Antonio Villaraigosa; Eric Garcetti
- Preceded by: William Bratton; Michael Downing (Interim)
- Succeeded by: Michel Moore

Personal details
- Born: Charles Lloyd Beck; June 27, 1953 (age 72) Long Beach, California, U.S.
- Nickname: "Charlie"
- Police career
- Department: Chicago Police Department; Los Angeles Police Department
- Service years: Chicago P.D.: December 2019-April 2020; Los Angeles P.D.: March 1977 – June 2018 (41 years)
- Rank: Acting Superintendent of the Chicago P.D.: 12/2019; Chief of L.A.P.D. (56th): 11/2009; Deputy Chief: 8/2006; Commander: 4/2005; Captain: 7/1999; Lieutenant: 4/1993; Sergeant: 6/1984; Sworn in as a Police Officer: 3/1977; Sworn in as a Reserve Police Officer: 1975

Charles Lloyd Beck (born June 27, 1953) is a retired American police officer, formerly serving as the Chief of the Los Angeles Police Department (LAPD) and subsequently as the Superintendent of the Chicago Police Department. A veteran of the department with over four decades as an officer, he is known for commanding and rehabilitating the Rampart Division after the Rampart scandal; and for technology enhancements during his time as Chief of Detectives. He agreed to be interim Superintendent of Police in Chicago in late 2019 while the city searched for a replacement for retiring Eddie Johnson. Beck took the helm of the Chicago Police Department on December 2, 2019, after Johnson was fired. On April 15, 2020, Beck stepped down and was replaced by former Dallas Police Department Chief David Brown, who had been nominated by Lightfoot to serve as permanent Superintendent. After his retirement he rejoined the Reserve Corps as a Reserve Police Officer and is assigned to the Office Of The Chief Of Police.

== Early life and education ==
Beck is a native of Long Beach, California. He attended Mayfair High School in Lakewood, California, and then the California State University, Long Beach where he received a B.A. in occupational studies-vocational arts. His father, George, was also an LAPD officer, retiring at the rank of deputy chief in 1980.

== Career ==
Beck was appointed to the Los Angeles Police Department in March 1977 after serving two years with the Los Angeles Police Reserve Corps. As a patrol officer, his assignments included both the Rampart and Hollywood divisions. After promotion to sergeant in June 1984, Beck worked in the Department's C.R.A.S.H. program under then-chief, Daryl Gates, in the 1980s and early 1990s. Beck worked in the Department's Internal Affairs division as a sergeant and a lieutenant. He was promoted to lieutenant in April 1993 and to captain in July 1999 (following that promotion he was initially assigned to Southeast Division, followed by terms as the Commanding Officer of Juvenile Division, Central Area and finally Rampart Area), and then commander in April 2005. In August 2006, he achieved the rank of deputy chief, the same rank that his father, a retired Los Angeles police officer, had attained. Upon that promotion, he assumed command of Operations-South Bureau. Beck went on to become Chief of Detectives, and implemented a number changes to the Detective Bureau, particularly in the use of technology (for which the Detective Bureau has overall responsibility for the entire LAPD). Beck was appointed Chief of Police in November 2009. According to the Los Angeles Times, Beck was paid a salary of $297,000 in 2011.

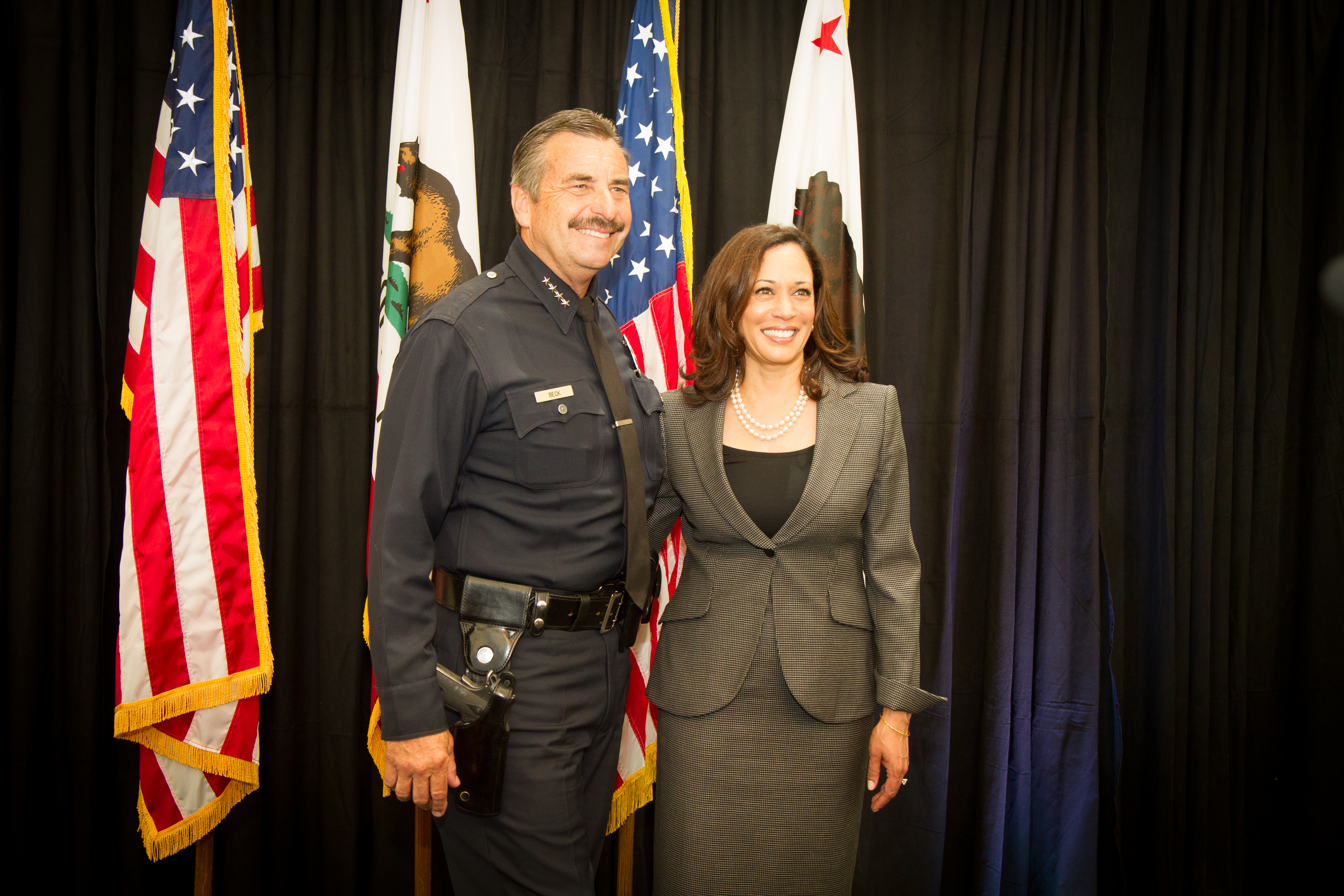
Beck and California Attorney General Kamala Harris celebrate the 50th anniversary of the signing of the Civil Rights Act of 1964.

During the 2013 manhunt of Christopher Dorner, eight Los Angeles police officers fired 103 rounds at two innocent women who were delivering newspapers; one woman, a 71-year-old, was shot twice in the back, and the other woman was injured by broken glass. Even though a commission found that the eight officers violated department policy, none were suspended or fired; Beck chose to allow the shooting officers to return to duty after undergoing additional training. In a settlement, the two women shot by police received $4.2 million from the City of Los Angeles; Beck described the shooting "a tragic misinterpretation" by police working under "incredible tension."

On April 17, 2015, California Attorney General Kamala Harris announced a statewide program of anti-bias training for law enforcement officers. Beck said removing built-in bias among officers "is not something you get inoculated against once in your life and that’s it. This takes constant retraining, constant discussion." Beck and Harris had established a close working relationship. LAPD spokesman Josh Rubenstein stated that "Beck assigned a security detail for US Senator Kamala Harris shortly before she was sworn into office in 2017, based on a threat assessment he believed to be credible."

On January 19, 2018, Beck announced his retirement later that year. On June 4 of that year, Mayor Garcetti announced that Michel Moore would succeed him on June 27.

On November 8, 2019, Chicago's mayor, Lori Lightfoot appointed Beck as the city's interim superintendent, to commence upon the retirement of incumbent Eddie Johnson. Lightfoot praised Beck and said he "stood firmly on the side of immigrant rights in the face of opposition related to Los Angeles' status as a Sanctuary City, and its choices related to non-cooperation with federal immigration officials." Chicago will conduct a nationwide search for the permanent Superintendent. Beck declined a permanent position, and agreed to hold the Office for a few months. On April 2, 2020, Beck was replaced by former Dallas Police Department Chief David Brown as Superintendent.

== Personal life ==
Beck is known to be an avid motocross enthusiast, winning several awards in the sport, and is the current Police and Fire Motocross national champion. His sister, Megan, was a detective. His wife, Cindy, was a narcotics dog handler. Two of his children, Brandi and Martin, are LAPD officers. His daughter Megan is a Deputy Sheriff for LASD.

In 2016, Beck made a cameo appearance on Real Housewives of Beverly Hills when he ran into Erika Jayne and her husband Thomas Girardi while having lunch.

In 2018, Beck appeared in a cameo role as Police Chief in the music video When the Seasons Change by Five Finger Death Punch.

Police appointments
Preceded by Michael P. Downing	Chief of Los Angeles Police Department; 2009–2018	Succeeded by Michel Moore
