= Rikki Klieman =

American lawyer (born 1948)

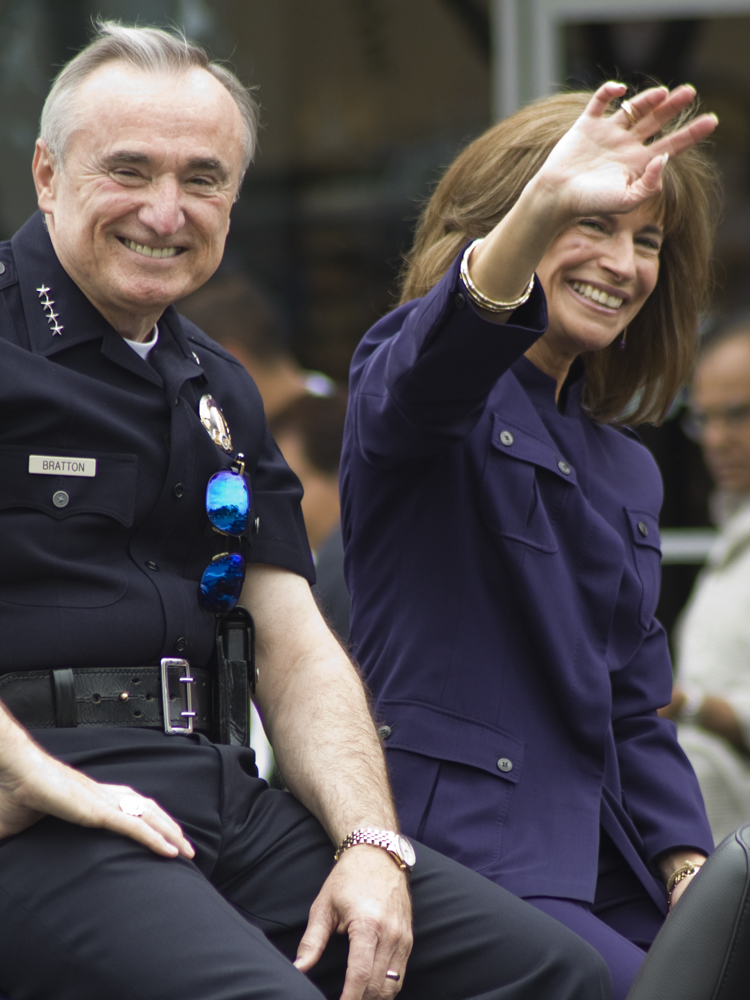
- Klieman (right) and husband William Bratton at LA/Valley Pride
- Born: 1948 (age 77–78); Chicago, United States
- Education: Northwestern University; Boston University School of Law
- Occupations: Attorney; Author; Actress; Television commentator
- Spouse: William J. Bratton

Rikki Klieman (born 1948) is an American criminal defense lawyer and television personality. A native of Chicago, she is a legal analyst for CBS News, having previously worked in criminal defense in Boston and taught at Columbia Law School. Additionally, she is an author, actress, and is married to William Bratton, former chief of the Los Angeles Police Department and former Police Commissioner of the New York Police Department.

== Early life ==
Klieman was born in 1948 to a Ukrainian Jewish immigrant family in Chicago, where she danced, acted, and sang as a youth. Klieman attended Northwestern University where she was a theater major and had plans of becoming an actress. However, she decided to attend law school. Klieman graduated from Boston University School of Law in 1975 with her Juris Doctor. During law school she externed for U.S. District Court judge Walter Jay Skinner.

== Legal career ==
After law school Klieman was an assistant district attorney for the Middlesex County District Attorney's Office, before she joined the Boston, Massachusetts, law firm of Friedman & Atherton and then started her own private practice. In 1983 she was named by Time magazine as one of the five best female attorneys in the United States. In 1993 in the case of Commonwealth v. Twitchell she defended the Christian Scientist parents whose two-year-old son died of an untreated bowel obstruction. From 1996 to 2003 she was a member of the faculty of Columbia Law School, and previously taught at the law school of her alma mater, Boston University.

== Other ==
Klieman worked for TruTV until October 30, 2009, when its news division was absorbed into CNN's existing crime/justice coverage unit. She has also acted in the guest-recurring role of lawyer Kathy Berson on TV series Las Vegas during the 2005–06 season. More recently, she has appeared on the TV show Shark. She also wrote her autobiography with co-author Peter Knobler, Fairy Tales Can Come True: How a Driven Woman Changed Her Destiny. She's been married to her third husband, Bill Bratton, the former police chief of Boston, New York City, and Los Angeles, since 1999. Klieman is his fourth wife. In 2013 she appeared as Katrina McCarthy in the season 4 episode "Justice Served" of the CBS police procedural drama Blue Bloods, as well as appearing in 2014 in the season 5 episode "Loose Lips" as Judge Fowler, and again appeared as Judge Fowler in 2015 in the 6th-season episode "Rush to Judgment" of Blue Bloods.

As of 2015, Klieman regularly appears as a legal analyst for CBS News' morning news show CBS This Morning.
