= Reneé Hall =

Former Chief of the Dallas Police Department

29th Chief of the Dallas Police Department
- In office September 1, 2017 – December 31, 2020
- Preceded by: David Brown
- Succeeded by: Eddie Garcia

Deputy Chief of the Detroit Police Department
- In office May 2014 – August 2017

Personal details
- Born: February 10, 1971 (age 55) Detroit, Michigan, U.S.
- Police career
- Department: Dallas Police Department; Detroit Police Department
- Service years: Dallas P.D.: September 2017-January 2021; Detroit P.D.: February 2013 – September 2017
- Rank: Chief of the Dallas P.D.: 9/2017; Deputy Chief of the Detroit Police Department: 5/2014; Commander of Detroit PD: 10/2013; Interim Inspector: 2/2013
- Badge no.: Chief of Police

Ulysha Reneé Hall (born February 10, 1971) is an American police officer. She served as the chief of police of the Dallas Police Department from 2017 through the end of 2020.

Hall grew up in Detroit. Her father was a police officer with the Detroit Police Department, but was murdered in 1971 when she was six months old. She attended Grambling State University and University of Detroit Mercy, and became an officer with the Detroit Police Department herself. She was promoted to deputy chief of the Detroit police in 2014. The Detroit City Council noted in 2017 that "Deputy Chief Ulysha Renee Hall has served the Detroit Police Department and the citizens of Detroit with loyalty, integrity and professionalism. She is widely respected throughout the law enforcement community as a disciplined leader and consummate professional with the proven ability to deliver results." In 2017, she moved to Dallas to become chief of the Dallas Police Department. She became the first woman (and first black woman) to serve as police chief in Dallas. On September 8, 2020, Hall sent her letter of resignation to the Dallas city manager, which was accepted. However, Hall's resignation did not go into effect until the end of 2020.

== Appointments ==
Major Cities Chiefs-Police Executive Leadership Institute (PELI IV) September 2016 to March 2017

Graduate of the FBI National Academy Session #262 October 5, 2015 through December 11, 2015

Gubernatorial Appointment to The State of Michigan Elevator Safety Board 2014 & 2016 Governor Rick Snyder

In 2022, Hall was named a fellow of Harvard University's Advanced Leadership Initiative.

In 2023, Hall was elected National Second Vice President of National Organization of Black Law Enforcement Executives (NOBLE).

== Honors ==
2015 Honoree for Women of Excellence Michigan Chronicle

2017 Woman of the Decade Native Detroiter

Congressional Badge of Bravery Board Member (CBOB)
