= Daniel Comeaux =

American federal agent

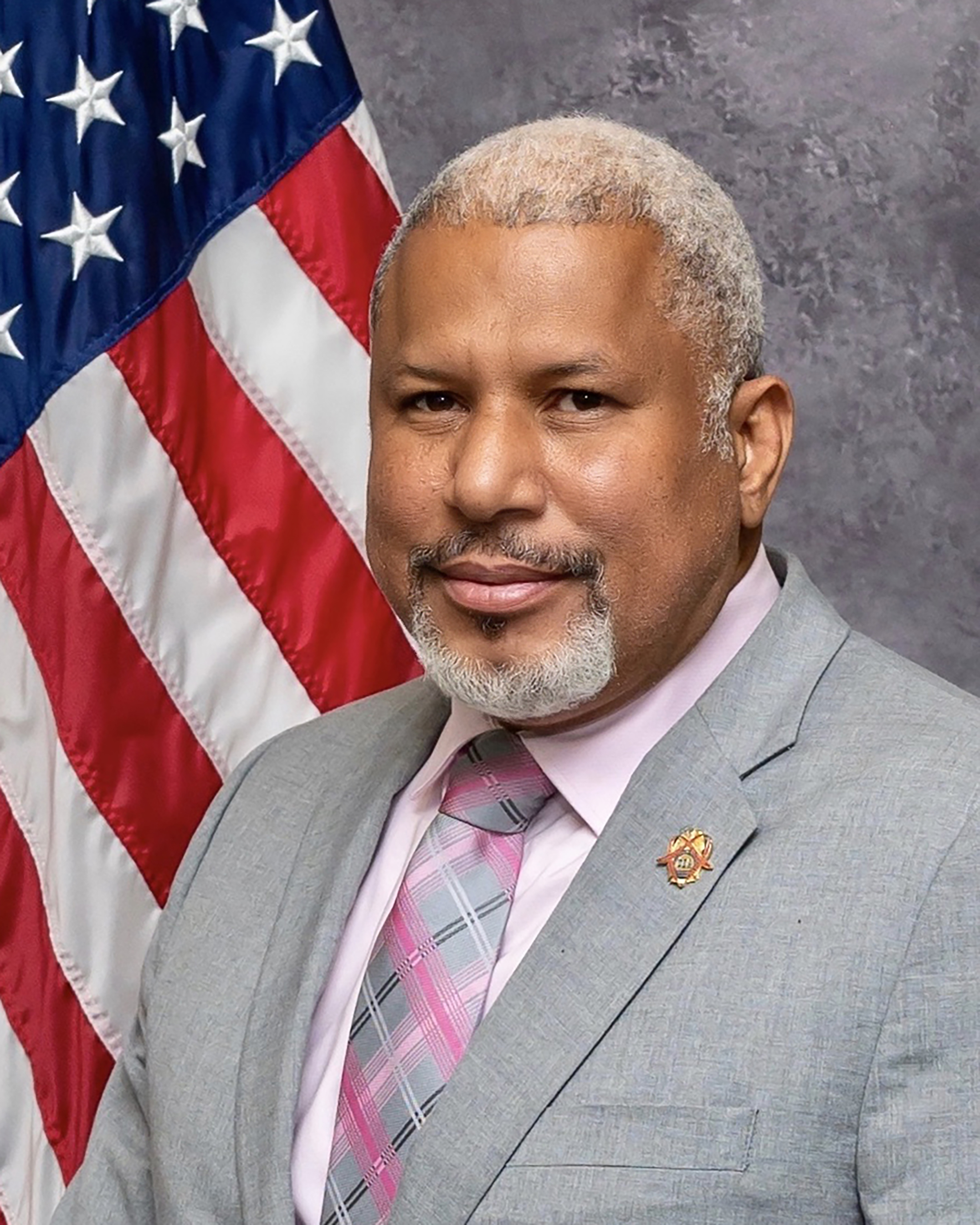
- Drug Enforcement Administration portrait of Comeaux

31st Chief of the Dallas Police Department
- Incumbent
- Assumed office April 23, 2025
- Mayor: Eric Johnson
- Preceded by: Edgardo "Eddie" Garcia

Personal details
- Born: June 4, 1969 (age 56) Lafayette, Louisiana, U.S.
- Education: St. Louis Community College-Forest Park (AS); University of Houston - Downtown (BS)

Daniel C. Comeaux (born June 4, 1969) is an American police officer currently serving as the 31st Chief of the Dallas Police Department. He assumed this position in April 2025.

== Early life and education ==
Comeaux was born on June 4, 1969, in Lafayette, Louisiana; although born in Lafayette, he grew up in New Orleans, Louisiana.

Comeaux played varsity baseball at St. Louis Community College–Forest Park and graduated with an associate degree in 1990. He then continued playing varsity baseball at Texas State University (formerly known as Southwest Texas State University). Comeaux later graduated from the University of Houston–Downtown with a bachelor degree in 1995. Comeaux became a member of Omega Psi Phi fraternity, in 1997 by joining the Rho Beta Beta chapter in the 9th district.

== Career ==
=== Houston Police Department ===
Comeaux began his career by becoming a police officer in the Houston Police Department in 1991; shortly after beginning, he became one of the department's narcotics officers.

=== Drug Enforcement Administration (DEA) ===
After completing his undergraduate degree, Comeaux then joined the Drug Enforcement Administration (DEA) in 1997; Comeaux worked for the DEA from 1997 until April of 2025. Throughout his time with DEA, he assumed roles in nine different offices: Special Agent in the San Francisco Division Oakland Resident office in 1997, Special Agent in the Houston Field Division in 2000, Group Supervisor of the Tucson District Office in 2008, Resident Agent in Charge of the Gulfport Resident Office in 2011, Staff Coordinator in the Operations Division, Office of Global Enforcement - Mexico/Central America/Canada Section in Washington D.C. in 2014, Assistant Special Agent in Charge of the New Orleans Division Jackson District Office in Jackson, Mississippi in 2015, Senior Executive Service as the Associate Special Agent of DEA's Los Angeles Field Division in 2018, Special Agent in Charge of the San Francisco Field Division in 2019, and Special Agent in Charge of the DEA Houston Field Division in 2021

=== National Association of Black Narcotic Agents (NABNA) ===
From 2016 until 2021, concurrently with his DEA positions, Comeaux served as President of the National Association of Black Narcotic Agents, an organization aimed at assisting law enforcement agencies in the recruitment of minorities and improving the image of narcotic law enforcement as a viable career choice for minorities.

=== Dallas Police Department ===
After 33 years of prior law enforcement experience, Comeaux became the Chief of Dallas Police Department in April of 2025. Comeaux's stated priorities have been officer recruitment, instituting proactive policing strategies, transparency and community engagement, reforming the department's internal affairs division, and combatting safety issues that accompany large-scale events such as Lone Star New Year's Eve and the 2026 FIFA World Cup. One of Comeaux's most covered decisions while in office has been his rejection of a $25 million partnership between Dallas Police Department and United States Immigration and Customs Enforcement. Still, Comeaux has voiced his commitment to assisting federal law enforcement agencies.
