= Lee Paul =

American film and television actor (1939–2019)

- Born: Paul Lee Kroll; June 16, 1939; United States
- Died: September 22, 2019 (aged 80)
- Occupations: Film and television actor
- Years active: 1966–1988
- Height: 6 ft 6 in (198 cm)
- Spouse: Kathy Kroll
- Website: leepaulusa.com

Paul Lee Kroll (June 16, 1939 – September 22, 2019), also known as Lee Paul, was an American film and television actor. He was best known for playing the bodyguard of Doyle Lonnegan (Robert Shaw) in the 1973 film The Sting, alongside actor Charles Dierkop who played Floyd.

Paul was born in the United States, where he was raised in Brooklyn, New York. He attended college in Marietta, Ohio, and served in the United States Air Force. He guest-starred in numerous television programs including Hawaii Five-O, Quincy, M.E., Wonder Woman, Fantasy Island, Tenspeed and Brown Shoe, The Rookies, The Fall Guy, Simon & Simon, Emergency!, Ironside, Police Woman, Matlock, Falcon Crest, Cannon, Happy Days, Mannix, Adam-12 and Mission: Impossible.

Paul was married to dancer Kathy Kroll. He was an expatriate to Sweden for Swedish-American Day, and was a petroleum engineer.

Paul died on September 22, 2019, at the age of 80.

== Partial filmography ==
- Mission Impossible (1971-1972) - Gristin, Schmidt
- Ben (1972) - Careu
- The Sting (1973) - Lonnegan's bodyguard
- The Rookies (1973) - Tim Duvall
- Kung Fu (1973) - Gilchrist
- Hawaii Five-O (1969, S1Ep23 "Not That Much Different"
- Hawaii Five-O (1972, S4E18) - Mitch Keller
- ’’Cannon’’ (1973, S3E3) - Menacing Loan Shark
- Scream of the Wolf (1974) - Student
- Get Christie Love (1974) - Pilot Episode, Max Loomis
- Happy Days (1974) - Mory
- The Island at the Top of the World (1974) - Chief of Boat Archers
- Police Woman (1975 - 1977)
- Emergency! (1975) - Pete
- The Fall Guy (1985) - Henchman
- Deadly Friend (1986) - Sergeant Charlie Volchek
- The Van Dyke Show (1988) - Al
