= Dallas Police Department =

Dallas, Texas law enforcement agency

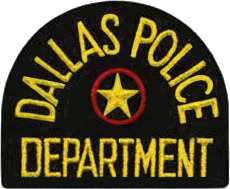
- Patch

- Badge
- Abbreviation: DPD

Agency overview
- Formed: 1881; 145 years ago
- Employees: 3,581 (2020)
- Annual budget: $517 m (2020)

Jurisdictional structure
- Operations jurisdiction: Dallas, Texas, U.S.
- Area: 342.5 square miles (887 km^{2})
- Population: 1,345,076 (2018)
- Legal jurisdiction: Dallas
- Governing body: Dallas City Council

Operational structure
- Headquarters: 1400 S. Botham Jean Blvd., Dallas, Texas
- Officers: ▼3,168 of 4,000 (2025)
- Civilians: 574 (2020)
- Agency executive: Daniel Comeaux, Chief of Police

Facilities
- Stations: 7: Central (1); Northeast (2); Southeast (3); Southwest (4); Northwest (5); North Central (6); South Central (7); Source:
- Marked police cars: 1200
- Unmarked vehicles: 900
- Motorcycles: 40
- Police Boats: 2
- Helicopters: 2

Website
- dallaspolice.net

The Dallas Police Department, established in 1881, is the principal law enforcement agency serving the city of Dallas, Texas.

== Organization ==
The department is headed by a chief of police who is appointed by the city manager who, in turn, is hired by the Dallas City Council. The city manager is not an elected official.

Primary responsibility for calls for police service are seven operations divisions based on geographical subdivisions of the city. Each operations division is commanded by a deputy chief of police. The divisions are designated Central, Northeast, Southeast, South Central, Southwest, Northwest and North Central and operate from facilities which are referred to as substations. Each operations division's geographical area is further subdivided into sectors which are composed of beats, each of which is normally patrolled by a uniformed officer or officers in a squad car. Calls for service are received primarily through the city's 9-1-1 system which is answered by a city-operated emergency communications center. Each substation also has an investigative unit with detectives who are assigned cases of burglary and theft which are committed within the area covered by their division.

Other crimes are investigated by specialized investigative units including the Child Abuse Squad, Family Violence Squad, Narcotics Division, CAPERS [Crimes Against Persons] Robbery, Assault, and Homicide Units, Forgery Squad and a Computer Crimes Team.

A specialized Tactical Division includes a SWAT Operations Unit, Mounted Unit, Canine Unit, Helicopter Unit and an Explosive Ordnance Squad. The SWAT Operations Unit was featured on a reality series for the A&E Network in 2006 entitled "Dallas SWAT".

All Officers are armed with a Glock pistol chambered in 9mm as their sidearm.

== History ==
The first Chief of Police, J. C. Arnold, was elected in 1881. Prior to that, an elected Town Marshal and deputies had guarded Dallas since 1856. Arnold held the position for 17 years.

By 1898, 34 officers patrolled the city on horseback. In 1907, the department acquired an automobile and two motorcycles.

During the heyday of the Ku Klux Klan in Dallas in the 1920s, a sizable number of DPD were KKK members, including police commissioners and police chiefs. One list of members includes at least 106 Dallas police officers, which at the time was the majority of the police department. During this period, the DPD did not protect the non-white community in Dallas and did not pursue cases involving racial violence against Blacks.

In November 2021, Distributed Denial of Secrets released 1.8 terabytes of police helicopter surveillance footage from the Dallas Police Department and the Georgia State Patrol. According to Wired, the footage showed helicopters capturing everything from cars lined up at a drive-through, and people standing in their yards and on the street. Non-profit advocacy group Fight for the Future called the leak "a crystal-clear example of why mass surveillance makes our society less safe, not more safe."

=== Line-of-duty deaths ===
According to The Officer Down Memorial Page, between 1892 and 2016, 84 members of the Dallas Police Department died in the line of duty. The best-known instance was the murder of Officer J. D. Tippit, who was shot dead less than an hour after the assassination of President John F. Kennedy on November 22, 1963. Lee Harvey Oswald was charged with both crimes but was murdered before he could stand trial.

Other notable deaths include the murder of Officer Robert W. Wood on November 28, 1976, which was later examined in Errol Morris' documentary, The Thin Blue Line. Additionally, Senior Corporal Victor Lozada, a motorcycle officer in the Traffic Division, was killed on February 22, 2008, while serving as part of an escort to Senator Hillary Clinton's motorcade near downtown Dallas for a presidential campaign event; Senior Corporal Lozada's funeral was attended by over 4,500 police officers as well as Senator Clinton. On January 6, 2009, Senior Corporal Norman Smith, an 18-year veteran, was shot and killed while attempting to serve an arrest warrant.

The 2016 shooting of Dallas police officers is the deadliest single incident for law enforcement officers in the U.S. since the September 11 attacks in 2001. On July 7, 2016, Micah Xavier Johnson ambushed and fired upon a group of Dallas Police Department (DPD) and Dallas Area Rapid Transit (DART) officers, killing five officers and injuring nine others. Two civilians were also wounded. The shooting happened at the end of a protest against the police killings of Alton Sterling in Baton Rouge, Louisiana, and Philando Castile in Falcon Heights, Minnesota.

== Incidents involving misconduct ==
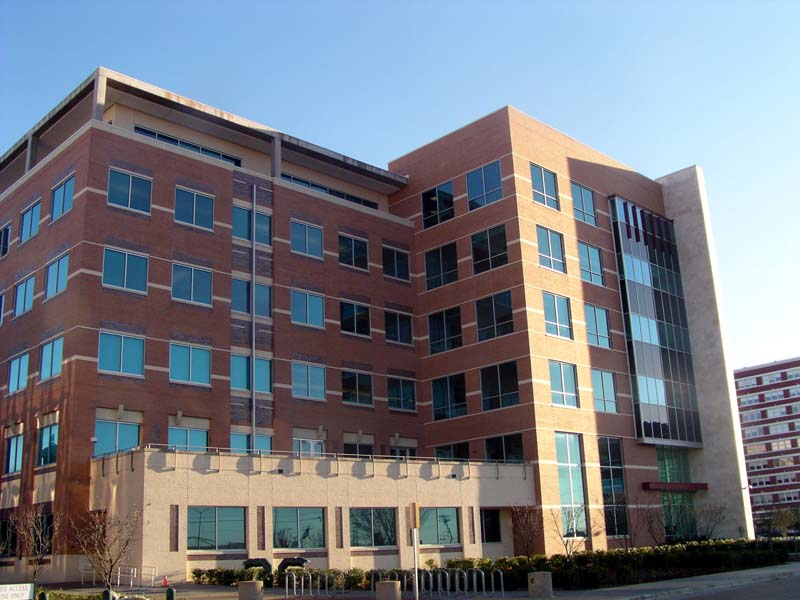
Dallas Police Department headquarters

=== Deaths of Officers Rawlings and Daniels ===
On 15 August 1899 at about four in the morning, two Dallas police officers killed each other in what was described in the press as a duel. Officer Albert P Rawlings and Officer Charles A Daniels killed each other at the corner of Main and Poydras streets. The two men had a long-standing grudge.

=== Murder of Santos Rodriguez ===
Early in the morning of July 24, 1973, Dallas police officers Darrell L. Cain and Roy Arnold were investigating a burglary, from a vending machine, of eight dollars. Two children, twelve-year-old Santos Rodriguez and thirteen-year-old David Rodriguez were taken from their home and brought to the scene of the crime. In an attempt to frighten Santos into confessing, Officer Cain, thinking he had emptied his service revolver of all its ammunition, aimed it at the boy and pulled the trigger twice. The second time, the gun discharged killing Santos, who was still handcuffed. Cain was found guilty of murder by a jury in November 1973 and sentenced to five years in prison. He served half of it. The City of Dallas apologized to the Rodriguez family forty years later.

=== Robert Powell ===
On March 18, 2009, NFL player Ryan Moats's mother-in-law, Jonetta Collinsworth, died from breast cancer. Moats, his wife Tamisha (Collinsworth's daughter) and other family members rushed to Baylor Regional Medical Center in Plano, Texas, when they were informed that she was close to death. After driving through a red light, Moats was stopped by police officer Robert Powell who delayed him for more than 10 minutes outside the hospital's emergency room, allowing the rest of the family to leave, even after Moats's ordeal was corroborated by a nurse in the hospital to Powell. Powell even drew his gun at Moats during the incident. By the time Moats reached Collinsworth, she had died. Moats questioned whether race could have played a factor in the interaction due to the nature and tone of the officer's remarks to the family; When asked if he felt if Officer Powell be fired, Moats said, "I really don't know. All I know is what he did was wrong. I mean, he stole a moment away from me that I can never get back. I'm really not the judge on what should happen to him. I think maybe his superiors and the Dallas police should handle what should happen to him." Officer Powell issued an apology to Moats. Police officials investigated Powell's actions; he was placed on administrative leave but later resigned from the department. After Moats' incident with Officer Powell, former Cowboy Zach Thomas acknowledged that Powell was the same officer who handcuffed and jailed his wife Maritza after she was pulled over for making an illegal u-turn in July 2008.

=== Fake drug scandal ===
Beginning on December 31, 2001, the local ABC-affiliate, WFAA, began broadcasting a series of investigative reports alleging that hundreds of pounds of cocaine and methamphetamine seized by undercover officers of the DPD Narcotics Division during 2001 were actually not illegal substances. The subsequent "fake drug" scandal led to dismissal of over 80 drug cases by the Dallas County District Attorney's office, multiple investigations, the indictment of three current or former DPD narcotics officers, the release of defendants (many whom were falsely accused Mexican immigrants) who had pleaded guilty to cases where later investigation revealed no illegal drugs were involved and the prosecution of multiple informants that had been used to make cases that were subsequently dismissed. In 2003, the Dallas City Manager fired Dallas Police Chief Terrell Bolton, due in part for his department's lack of oversight of the Narcotics Dept. officers involved in these fake drug arrests. He sued the City of Dallas over that firing but his case was dismissed with prejudice in 2005. Many of the 25 victims of the false arrests and wrongful prosecution won Federal Civil Rights Violations lawsuit settlements and actual jury case awards against the City of Dallas. One attorney who sued the city on behalf of what was a large percentage of Mexican immigrants who spoke little English, said, "the total cost could climb to as much as $8 million once all 25 cases are resolved."

=== Ronald Jones beating ===
In December 2009, Dallas police officers received word that two white men were fighting in the downtown area. Failing to locate the described men, Officer Matthew Antkowiak discovered a black man crossing the street and made a pedestrian stop of him which turned into a scuffle. Other officers then joined in. The man, Ronald Jones, ended up spending fourteen months in jail on various charges. When Jones’ defense attorney viewed video tapes of the beating, he believed that the police reports had been falsified. The City contended that while the reports were inaccurate and incomplete, this was attributed in part to Officer Antkowiak's inability to accurately relate the events to the officer that did the actual report (Officer Antkowiak claimed to have suffered a closed-head injury during the incident that aggravated a prior confirmed injury). Mr. Jones was released and in March 2014 awarded $1.1 million by the city to settle the matter. Officer Antkowiak retired on an unrelated medical claim and is no longer employed in law enforcement. He has set up a private firm to train policemen. No other disciplinary action was taken against any official.

=== Killing of Tony Timpa ===
On August 10, 2016, Dallas Police killed Tony Timpa, a 32-year-old resident who had called 911 for aid, telling the dispatcher that he had schizophrenia and depression but not taken his prescription medication. Timpa was already handcuffed when a group of officers restrained him on the ground while he squirmed, repeatedly crying out, "You're gonna kill me!". After he fell unconscious, the officers assumed he was asleep and, rather than confirm that he was breathing or feel for a pulse, joked about waking him up for school and making him breakfast. They kept him prone on grass for nearly 14 minutes and zip-tied his legs together, one pressing his knee into Timpa's back. One of the paramedics called to the scene administered the sedative Versed. The responders began to panic only as they loaded Timpa's body onto a gurney, one exclaiming, "He didn’t just die down there, did he?" Timpa died within 20 minutes of police officers' arrival, of "cocaine and the stress associated with physical restraint", according to his autopsy. It took over three years for footage of the incident to be released. The footage contradicted claims by Dallas Police that Timpa was aggressive. The officers involved were Sgt. Kevin Mansell and Officers Danny Vasquez and Dustin Dillard. Criminal charges against three officers were dropped in March 2019 and they returned to active duty.

=== Murder of Botham Jean ===
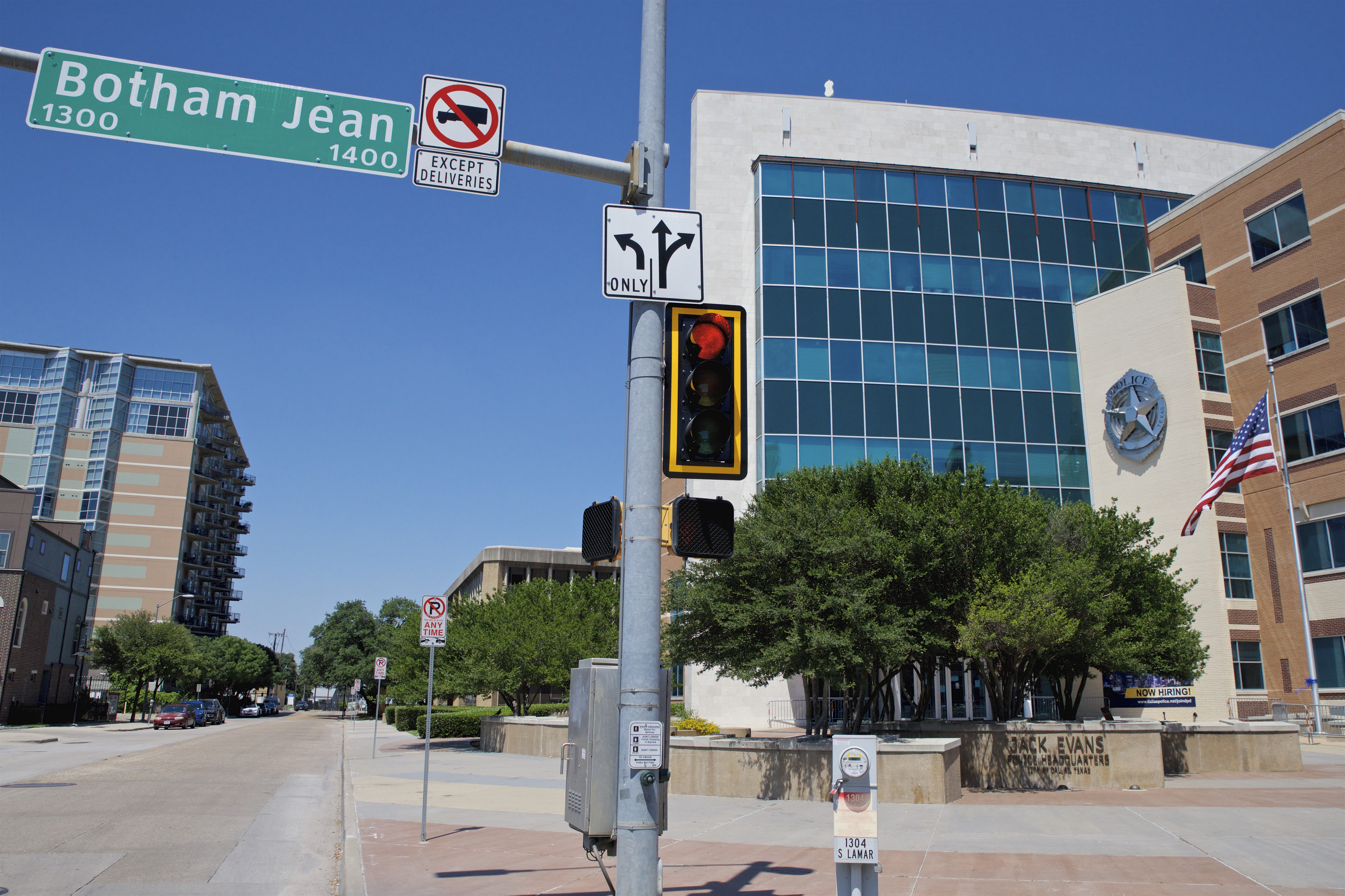
The street in front of Dallas police headquarters was renamed Botham Jean Blvd. in 2021.

On September 6, 2018, Dallas patrol officer Amber Guyger, in uniform but off duty after a daylong shift, entered the apartment of Botham Jean and shot and killed him. Guyger said that she had entered the apartment believing it was her own and shot Jean believing he was a burglar. She then called 911. Jean was taken to a nearby hospital, where he died from his wound. The investigation was taken over by the Texas Rangers, who were responsible for Guyger's arrest three days later. Guyger was charged with manslaughter, a 2nd degree felony in Texas, which carries a sentence of 2 to 20 years in a state prison and/or a fine not to exceed $10,000. On September 24, Guyger was terminated from the police force, after being placed on administrative leave since the shooting.

Following the shooting, an attorney representing Jean's family accused the Dallas police department of smearing Jean's reputation. The lawyers also disputed the account of the incident that Guyger told officials, which was recorded in the arrest warrant affidavit, and asserted that two independent witnesses had come forward to give recollections that conflict with Guyger's account.

On November 30, 2018, Guyger was indicted on murder charges by a Dallas County grand jury.

On September 22, 2019, the day before the trial began, Dallas County District Attorney John Creuzot took part in an interview regarding the trial in spite of a gag order issued by Judge Tammy Kemp in January of that year. After questioning jurors, who reported that they had not seen the interview or other media coverage of the trial, Kemp denied the defense's motion for a mistrial, and sequestered the jury.

On October 1, 2019, Guyger was found guilty of murder.

On October 2, 2019, Guyger was sentenced to 10 years in prison.

On October 5, it was revealed that Joshua Brown, a key witness for the prosecution, was killed after being shot more than once the previous night. Despite speculation about the motive behind Brown's killing, the slaying had nothing to do with the Jean case.

=== Murder of Liza Saenz and Albert Douglas ===
Bryan Riser was a former 13-year veteran on the Dallas police force. He was arrested on March 4, 2021, for the two unconnected murders of Liza Saenz and Albert Douglas in 2017. Riser was charged with two counts of capital murder. One of the men connected with the murder of Saenz told police that he and Riser had been connected with burglaries and that Riser had paid him and others $3,500 to kidnap and kill Albert Douglas, then later promised $6,000 to kill Saenz. Bryan Riser was later reinstated but resigned right after in July of 2024. He currently has pending lawsuit against the Detective who made the arrest without probable cause. Chief Garcia left department right after in August of 2024.

=== Corruption ===
The actions of the Dallas Police has been the subject of controversy over the years, with various convictions being overturned. Several of these were attributed to the actions of Captain Will Fritz, who was a Klux Klun member and District Attorney Henry Wade, who was posthumously exposed for his corruption. Craig Watkins, the first black American DA for Dallas County, described the Dallas police' tenure as having "a cowboy kind of mentality and the reality is that kind of approach is archaic, racist, elitist and arrogant." Watkins said in a 2010 interview in The Guardian that officers from his own jurisdiction "were taken aback because we were calling in to question the work they had done for all these years. It was the same among some folks in this office. They were afraid of the consequences of this Pandora's box being opened." In 2026, Tommy Lee Walker, who was reportedly intimidated by Fritz and threatened with a beatup, was symbolically exonerated, albeit the decision is not legally binding.

== Rank structure and Insignia ==
Rank	Insignia
Chief	
Executive Assistant Chief	
Assistant Chief	
Deputy Chief	
Major	
Lieutenant	
Sergeant	
Senior Corporal	
Police Officer	

Members of the department who are captains and below are protected by the city's civil service system with promotion based on the results of competitive examinations. Senior corporals typically are officers who serve either as field training officers in the Patrol Division or who serve as detectives in one of the department's investigative units. The rank of captain has not been in use since 1992, however, those who were captains were allowed to keep it as well as those who were demoted from any chief position, as chiefs once demoted must retain their last civil service rank. There is currently only one captain remaining as of 2018. Majors, deputy chiefs and assistant chiefs are appointed by the chief of police without examination and do not hold civil service protection for these ranks. Division commander and bureau commander are non-civil-service titles based on assignments. Members may hold both assignment titles and civil service or appointive ranks. On October 4, 2012, Chief David Brown created a new major rank in between captain and deputy chief.

== List of heads ==
=== Marshals (1856–1890) ===
List of Dallas City Marshalls
Order #	Marshal	Years	Notes
1st	Andrew M. Moore	1856-57	
2nd	Marlin M. Thompson	1857-1858	
3rd	Andrew M. Moore	1858	Removed from office after killing Andrew Cockrell
4th	William M. Moon	1858	
5th	George W. Baird	1859-60	
6th	Marlin M. Thompson	1860-61	
7th	Peter Stevenson	1861-62	
Confederate government rule from 1861-66
8th	JF Barbier	1868–72	appointed Governor Edmund J. Davis
9th	George W. Campbell	1872	appointed by Governor Edmund J. Davis
10th	Thomas Flynn	1872-74	first after restoration of elected marshals
11th	June Peak	1874-76	
12th	WF Morton	1876-81	
13th	James Carter Arnold	1881-90	

=== Chiefs ===
List of Chiefs of the Dallas Police Department
Order #	Marshal	Years	Notes
1st	James Carter Arnold	1881-98	
2nd	M. W. Kirby	1898	
3rd	G.E. Cornwell	1898–99	
4th	Sterling Price	1900–02	
5th	R.L. "Dick" Winfrey	1902–Jan. 6, 1904	
6th	Epps G. Knight	Jan. 19, 1904–1905	
7th	Robert P. Keith	1905–06	
8th	Ben F. Brandenburg	1906–08	
9th	R.L. Cornwell	Jun.–Dec. 1909	
10th	John W. Ryan	1909–21	
11th	Elmo Strait	1921–22	
12th	Louis Brown	1922–24	
13th	Claude W. Trammel	1924–35	
14th	Robert L. Jones	1935–39	
15th	James M. Welch	1939–45	
16th	Carl Hansson	May 3, 1945–Jan. 19, 1960	
17th	Jesse Curry	Jan. 20, 1960–Mar. 10, 1966	
18th	Charles Batchelor	Mar. 11, 1966– Dec. 31, 1969	
19th	W. Frank Dyson	Dec. 15, 1969–Осt. 19, 1973	
20th	Don Byrd	Oct. 19, 1973 - May 1, 1979	
21st	Glen King	May 21, 1979–Mar. 27, 1982	
22nd	Billy Don Prince	May 4, 1982–Aug. 1, 1988	
23rd	Mack Vines	Aug. 22, 1988–Sep. 13, 1990	
–	Sam Gonzales (acting chief)	1990-91	
24th	William Rathburn	Mar. 4, 1991–Mar. 1, 1993	
–	Robert Jackson Jr. (acting chief)	1993	
25th	Bennie R. Click	July 12, 1993–Sep. 30, 1999	
26th	Terrell Bolton	Oct. 1, 1999–Aug. 27, 2003	
–	Randy Hampton (acting chief)	2003-04	
27th	David Kunkle	June 24, 2004–May 5, 2010	
28th	David Brown	May 5, 2010–Oct. 5, 2016	
29th	Reneé Hall	Sep. 5, 2017–Jan. 1, 2021	
30th	Edgardo "Eddie" Garcia	Feb. 3, 2021–Oct. 17, 2024	
–	Michael Igo (acting chief)	Oct. 18, 2024–Apr. 10, 2025	
31st	Daniel Comeaux	Apr. 11, 2025–present	

== Demographics ==
Breakdown of the makeup of the rank and file of DPD as of 2016:

Gender Demographics of the DPD
Gender	2008	2016
Male	83%	81%
Female	17%	19%

Race/Ethnicity Demographics of the DPD
Race/Ethnicity	2008	2016
White	57%	50%
African American	24%	26%
Hispanic	16%	21%
Other	0%	0%
Asian/Pacific Islander	1%	2%
American Indian/Alaskan	1%	1%

== See also ==
- 2015 attack on Dallas police
- 2016 shooting of Dallas police officers
- List of Law enforcement in Texas
- Texas Rangers
