= Police Woman (TV series) =

American police procedural television series (1974–1978)

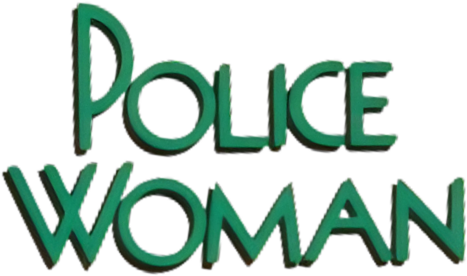
- Genre: Action; Police procedural
- Created by: Robert L. Collins
- Starring: Angie Dickinson; Earl Holliman; Ed Bernard; Charles Dierkop
- Music by: Morton Stevens
- Country of origin: United States
- No. of seasons: 4
- No. of episodes: 91 (list of episodes)

Production
- Executive producer: David Gerber
- Camera setup: Single-camera
- Running time: 48–50 minutes
- Production companies: David Gerber Productions; Columbia Pictures Television

Original release
- Network: NBC
- Release: September 13, 1974 – March 29, 1978

Related
- Police Story; Joe Forrester; David Cassidy: Man Undercover

Police Woman is an American police procedural television series created by Robert L. Collins and starring Angie Dickinson that ran on NBC for four seasons, from September 13, 1974, to March 29, 1978. The series follows Sgt. "Pepper" Anderson (Dickinson), an undercover officer working for the Criminal Conspiracy Unit of the Los Angeles Police Department, alongside her superior Sergeant William "Bill" Crowley (Earl Holliman) and teammates Pete Royster (Charles Dierkop) and Joe Styles (Ed Bernard). Based on an original screenplay by Lincoln C. Hilburn, the show depicted Pepper going undercover in a wide range of roles to investigate crimes ranging from murder to drug offenses.

Police Woman was one of the first hour-long television dramas starring a woman, and it influenced later series such as Charlie's Angels. It prompted a significant rise in applications from women to police departments across the United States. Dickinson received three Emmy nominations and won a Golden Globe award for the role. The show attracted considerable attention during its run, including an eighth-episode controversy in its first season over the portrayal of lesbian characters, which led to NBC agreeing not to rebroadcast that episode following protests from gay and lesbian activist groups.

== Synopsis ==
Based on an original screenplay by Lincoln C. Hilburn, the series revolves around Sgt. "Pepper" Anderson (Dickinson), an undercover police officer working for the Criminal Conspiracy Unit of the Los Angeles Police Department. Sergeant William "Bill" Crowley (Earl Holliman) was her immediate superior, and Pete Royster (Charles Dierkop) and Joe Styles (Ed Bernard) were the other half of the undercover team that investigated everything from murders to rape and drug crimes. In many episodes, Pepper went undercover (as a prostitute, nurse, teacher, flight attendant, prison inmate, dancer, waitress, etc.) to get close enough to the suspects to gain valuable information that would lead to their arrest.

== Character's name ==
Although Dickinson's character was called Pepper, sources differ as to the legal given name of the character. Most sources give the character's legal name as Suzanne (which was her undercover name in episode 8). Others give it as Leanne or Lee Ann (the latter name is mentioned by Crowley in the second-season episode "The Chasers" and by Pepper herself in the first-season episodes "Fish" and "The Stalking of Joey Marr"). The Police Story episode entitled "The Gamble", which serves as a pilot for Police Woman, gives Dickinson's character's name as "Lisa Beaumont", although her character in "The Gamble" is a new officer, whereas on "Police Woman" she is a seasoned detective sergeant. On the Season 1 DVD release of Police Woman, Dickinson states that the producers and she decided not to go with the name Lisa Beaumont when the series first went into production and came up with the name Pepper.

== Episodes ==
Season	Episodes	Originally released	
Season	Episodes	First released	Last released
Pilot		March 26, 1974	
1	22	September 13, 1974	March 14, 1975
2	24	September 12, 1975	March 2, 1976
3	23	September 28, 1976	March 22, 1977
4	22	October 25, 1977	March 30, 1978

== Guest stars ==
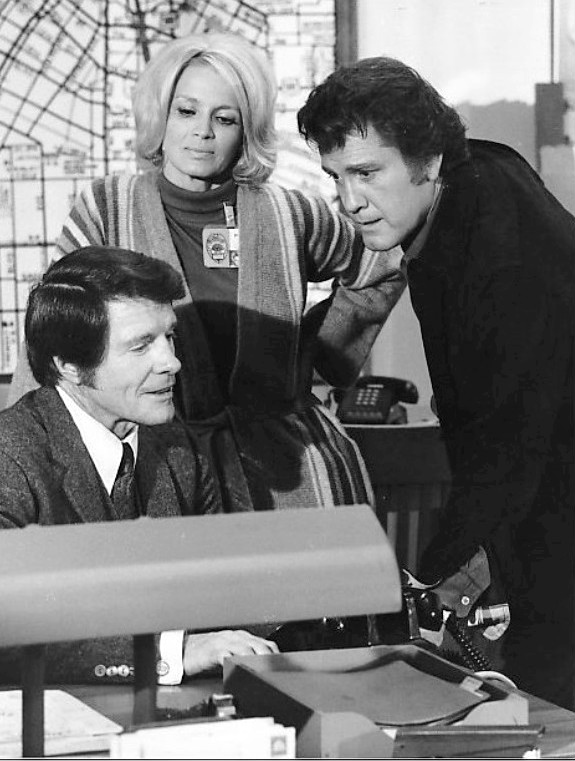
With Robert Horton, 1976

Among the guest stars in the series' 91 episodes were: Edie Adams, Loni Anderson, Diane Baker, Frank Bonner, Rossano Brazzi, Melendy Britt, Rory Calhoun, Dane Clark, Joan Collins, Bob Crane, Patricia Crowley, James Darren, Ruby Dee, Sandra Dee, Danny DeVito, Elinor Donahue, Patty Duke, Geoff Edwards, Sam Elliott, Ned Glass, Audrey Landers, Rhonda Fleming, Erica Hagen, Kevin Hagen, Larry Hagman, Florence Halop, Mark Harmon, Chick Hearn, Robert Horton, Amy Irving, Bayn Johnson, Cheryl Ladd, Fernando Lamas, Barry Livingston, Ida Lupino, Carol Lynley, Monte Markham, Ian McShane, Don Meredith, Donna Mills, Juliet Mills, James Olson, Annette O'Toole, Michael Parks, Lee Paul, E. J. Peaker, Joanna Pettet, Kathleen Quinlan, Kim Richards, Kyle Richards, Cathy Rigby, Smokey Robinson, Ruth Roman, Tom Rosqui, Ricky Segall, William Shatner, Fay Spain, Michelle Stacy, Laraine Stephens, Philip Michael Thomas, Robert Vaughn, John Vernon, Patrick Wayne, Carole Wells, Adam West, Barry Williams, and Debra Winger.

== Release ==
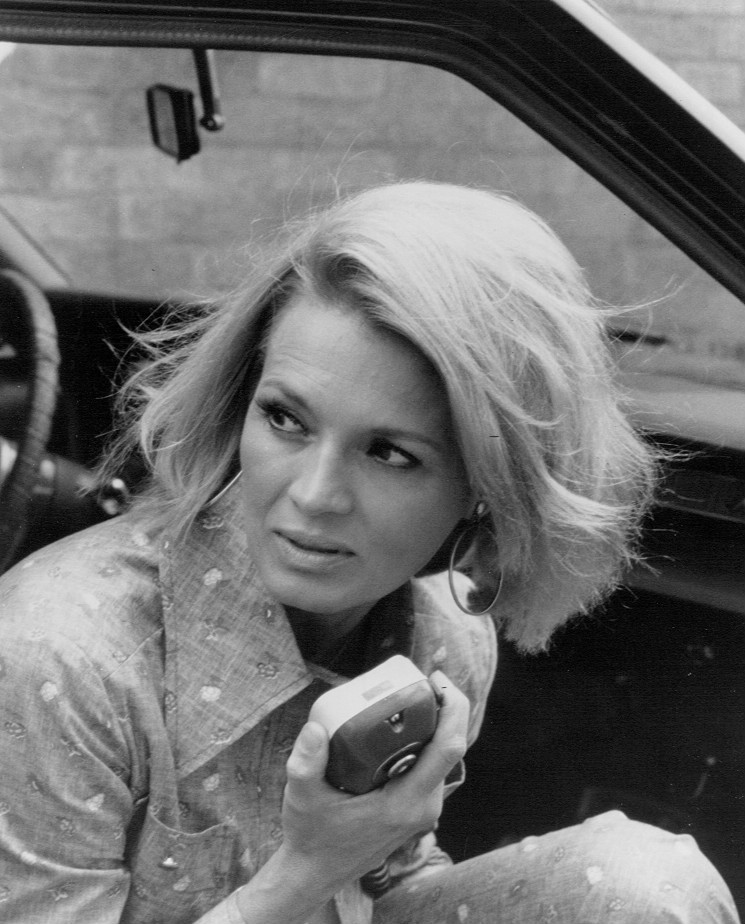
Dickinson as Sgt. "Pepper" Anderson

=== Ratings and timeslots ===
Season	Timeslot	Rank	Rating
(1) 1974–1975	Friday at 10:00 pm	#15	22.8
(2) 1975–1976	Friday at 10:00 pm	#30	20.2
(3) 1976–1977	Tuesday at 9:00 pm	#55	17.8
(4) 1977–1978	Wednesday at 9:00 pm	#74	15.3

=== Home media ===
On March 7, 2006, Sony Pictures Home Entertainment released season one of Police Woman on DVD in Region 1. Shout! Factory acquired the rights to the series in Region 1 in October 2011 and planned to release additional seasons on DVD. They subsequently released season two on February 7, 2012. Season three was released on December 19, 2017. Season four was released on May 8, 2018.

DVD Name	Ep #	Release date	
DVD Name	Ep #	Region 1	Region 4
The Complete First Season	22	March 7, 2006	October 5, 2016
The Complete Second Season	24	February 7, 2012	TBA
The Complete Third Season	24	December 19, 2017	TBA
The Complete Fourth Season	22	May 8, 2018	TBA

=== Syndication ===
The streaming service Tubi made all episodes of the show available to watch starting in January 2022. Several episodes from the first season are available to view for free in Minisode format on Crackle. Decades aired episodes on April 3 & April 4, 2021, as part of "The Decades Binge". The series is currently seen on MeTV+.

== Reception ==
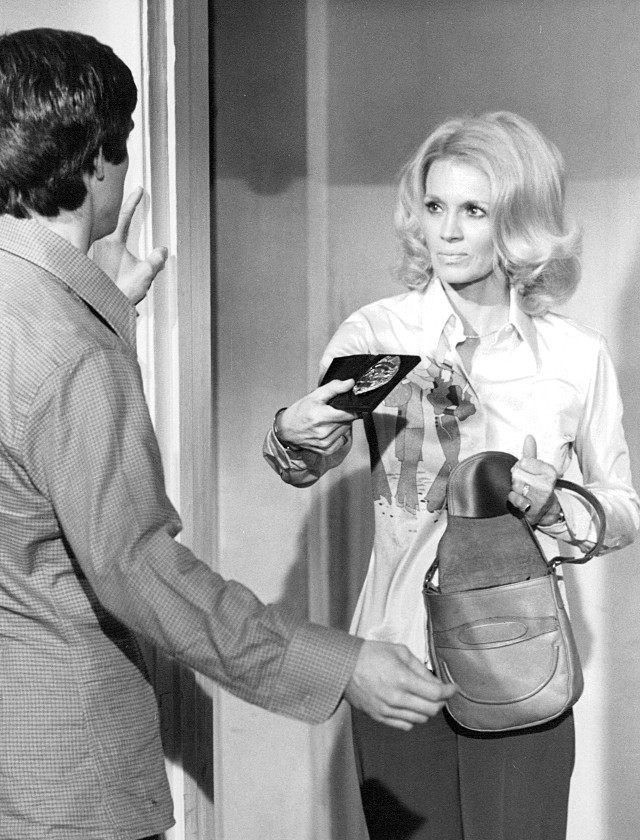
Dickinson flashes her badge, 1976

Police Woman was one of the first hour-long television dramas starring a woman. The pilot for Get Christie Love!, starring Teresa Graves, preceded Police Woman by about two months, as the pilot for Police Woman aired in March 1974 as an episode of Police Story entitled "The Gamble". The syndicated 1957 series Decoy, starring Beverly Garland, was the first series, a 30-minute drama, to focus on a female police officer.

Dickinson received three Emmy nominations and won a Golden Globe award for the show.

By the last season, Dickinson tired of appearing in scenes "where the phone rings while I'm taking a bath. I always want to look as sexy, beautiful and luscious as I can. But I'd prefer scripts where the sensuality is pouring out naturally for the whole 60 minutes". She, nonetheless, did not expect the show's cancellation in 1978. Dickinson said in 2019 that she somewhat regrets having done the series, since it left her with little time for other projects.

While the series never ranked above number 15 for the annual ratings, Police Woman hit number one for the week on two occasions during its first year, also hitting number one in several other countries where the program aired.

Police Woman influenced later shows such as Charlie's Angels, which People in 1978 described as a "three-shaker imitation". It caused an avalanche of applications for employment from women to police departments around the United States. Sociologists who have in recent years examined the inspiration for long-term female law enforcement officials to adopt this vocation have been surprised by how often Police Woman has been referenced.

President Gerald Ford rescheduled a press conference so as not to delay an episode of Police Woman, reportedly his favorite show.

=== "Flowers of Evil" controversy ===
"Flowers of Evil" was the eighth episode of season one; it aired on November 8, 1974. In it, Pepper investigates a trio of lesbians who run a retirement home while robbing and murdering the elderly residents. Gay and lesbian groups protested the episode, calling its portrayal of lesbianism stereotypical and negative. A group of lesbian activists zapped NBC's corporate offices a week after the episode aired, occupying the offices overnight. Following negotiations with activists, NBC agreed in 1975 not to rebroadcast the episode. "Flowers of Evil" is available on the season 1 DVD box set.
