= Amberton University =

Non-denominational Christian university for working adults in Garland, Texas

Coordinates: 32°51′35.71″N 96°39′10.59″W

- Motto: Rogamus ut Discamus (Latin)
- Motto in English: We seek, therefore we learn.
- Type: Private university
- Established: 1971
- Accreditation: SACS
- Religious affiliation: Christian
- President: Carol A. Palmer
- Faculty: 48
- Undergraduates: 118 (fall 2024)
- Postgraduates: 774 (fall 2024)
- Location: Garland, Texas, U.S.
- Campus: Urban, multiple sites
- Colors: Orange, white & green
- Website: amberton.edu

Amberton University is a private Christian university in Garland, Texas, United States. It focuses on educating working adults using distance education, with over 60% of programs completed entirely online. The university is accredited by the SACSCOC.

As of fall 2024, Amberton University enrolled 118 undergraduate and 774 graduate students.

== History ==
Amberton University was founded in 1971 as a branch of Abilene Christian College. Originally known as ACC Metrocenter, classes were conducted at the defunct Christian College of the Southwest in Mesquite. The university’s educational cornerstone was a criminal justice program for police officers, which was ultimately phased out in 1978.

In 1974, ACC Metrocenter opened its own campus in a two-story, 60,000-square-foot office building. In 1976, the branch was renamed Abilene Christian University at Dallas to align with the main campus’ title transition from "college" to "university".

ACU Dallas became an independent institution in 1981 after a four-year effort to secure its own accreditation. The university adopted the name Amber University. Twenty years later, in March 2001, the name was changed to Amberton University.

Amberton's first branch campus was opened in Frisco, Texas, in 2006.

In 2025, Amberton appointed its third president, Carol A. Palmer.

== Academics ==
Amberton University offers undergraduate and graduate degree programs, as well as certificates for professional skills.
