= William Bratton =

American police chief (born 1947)

Bill Bratton CBE
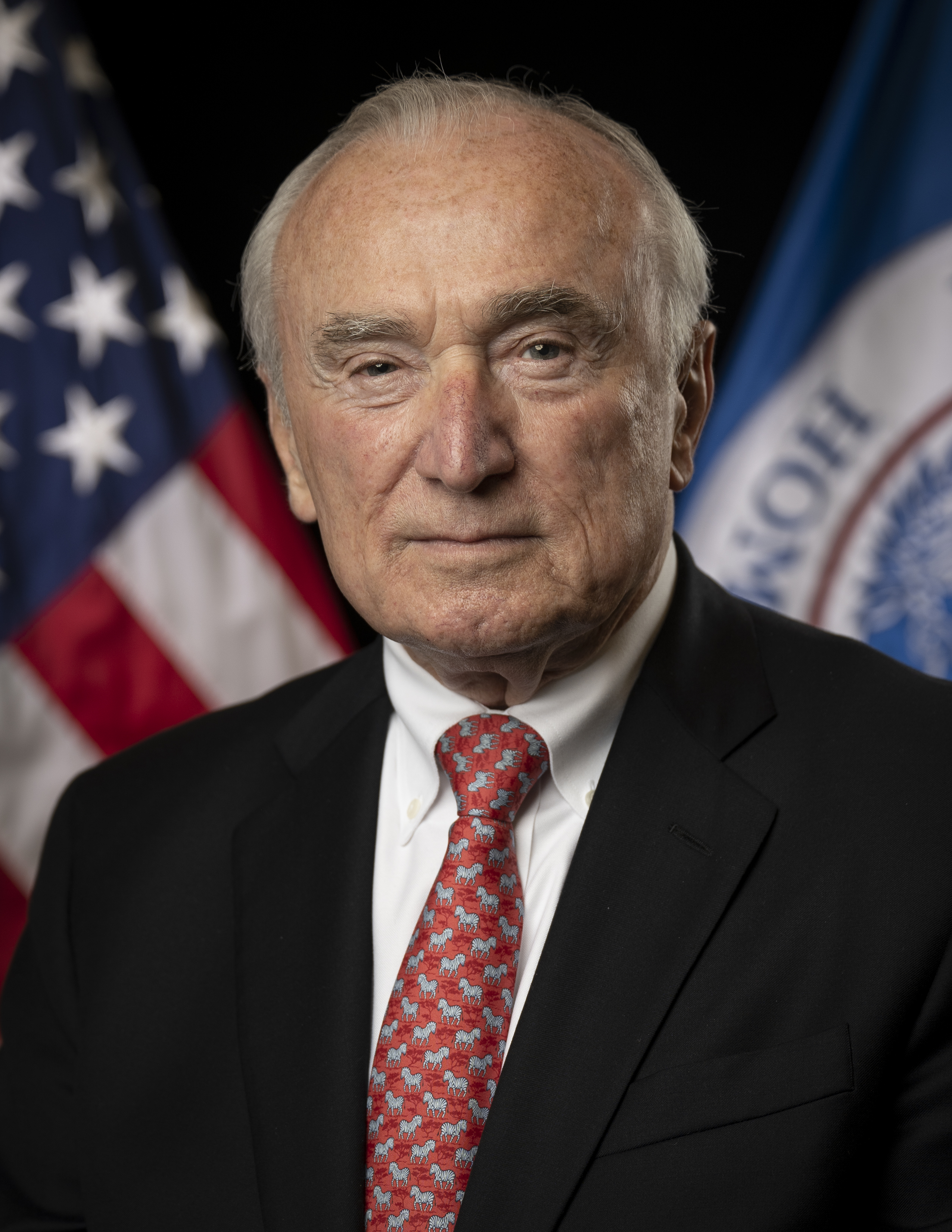
- Official portrait, 2022

Chair of the Homeland Security Advisory Council
- Incumbent
- Assumed office August 18, 2020 Serving with Jamie Gorelick
- President: Donald Trump; Joe Biden; Donald Trump
- Preceded by: William H. Webster

Vice Chair of the Homeland Security Advisory Council
- In office February 8, 2011 – August 18, 2020
- President: Barack Obama; Donald Trump
- Preceded by: Gary Hart
- Succeeded by: Karen Tandy

38th and 42nd New York City Police Commissioner
- In office January 1, 2014 – September 16, 2016
- Mayor: Bill de Blasio
- Preceded by: Raymond Kelly
- Succeeded by: James P. O'Neill
- In office January 1, 1994 – April 15, 1996
- Mayor: Rudy Giuliani
- Preceded by: Raymond Kelly
- Succeeded by: Howard Safir

Chief of Police of Los Angeles
- In office October 27, 2002 – October 31, 2009
- Appointed by: James Hahn
- Preceded by: Bernard C. Parks; Martin H. Pomeroy (interim)
- Succeeded by: Charlie Beck; Michael P. Downing (interim)

Commissioner of the Boston Police Department
- In office June 30, 1993 – January 1, 1994
- Appointed by: Raymond Flynn
- Preceded by: Francis Roache
- Succeeded by: Paul F. Evans

Chief of Police for the MBTA
- In office 1983–1986

Personal details
- Born: William Joseph Bratton; October 6, 1947 (age 79) Boston, Massachusetts, U.S.
- Party: Democratic
- Spouse(s): Mary Bratton (divorced) Linda Bratton (divorced) Cheryl Fiandaca (m. 1988; div. 1998) Rikki Klieman (m. 1999)
- Education: University of Massachusetts Boston (BS)
- Awards: Honorary Commander of the Order of the British Empire
Military career
Military career
Allegiance	United States
Branch	United States Army
Service years	1965–1970
Unit	Military Police Corps
Police career
Police career
Service years	Boston PD (1970–1983, 1992–1994); Massachusetts Bay Transportation Authority Police (1983–1986); Boston Metropolitan District Commission Police (1986–1990); NYC Transit PD (1990–1992); NYPD (1994–1996, 2014–2016); LAPD (2002–2009)
Rank	Commissioner of the NYPD; January 1, 2014 – September 2016; Chief of the Los Angeles P.D. October 27, 2002 – October 31, 2009; Commissioner of the NYPD; January 1, 1994 – April 15, 1996; Commissioner of the Boston Police Department; June 30, 1993 – January 1, 1994; Superintendent-in-Chief, Boston Police Department; January 1992; Chief of the New York City Transit Police; April 1990; Superintendent of the Metropolitan District Commission Police; June 1986; Chief of the Massachusetts Bay Transportation Authority Police; May 1983; Superintendent, Labor Relations; September 1982; Superintendent, Inspector of Bureaus; May 1982; Executive Superintendent; October 1980; Lieutenant; March 1978; Sergeant; July 1975; Patrol officer, Boston Police Department; October 1970

William Joseph Bratton CBE (born October 6, 1947) is an American businessman and former law enforcement officer who served two non-consecutive tenures as the New York City police commissioner (1994–1996 and 2014–2016) and currently one of only two NYPD commissioners to do so. (The other is Raymond Kelly.) He previously served as the Commissioner of the Boston Police Department (BPD) (1993–1994) and Chief of the Los Angeles Police Department (LAPD) (2002–2009). He is the only person to have led the police departments of the United States' two largest cities – New York and Los Angeles.

Bratton began his police career at the BPD before becoming police commissioner in New York, where his quality-of-life policy has been credited with reducing petty and violent crime. He was recruited to lead the LAPD in 2002, following a period when the LAPD was struggling to rebuild public trust after a series of controversies in the 1990s. Bratton presided over an era of reform and crime reduction. In January 2014, Bratton returned to the post of police commissioner in New York, and served until September 2016.

Bratton has served as an advisor on policing in several roles, including advising the British government and is currently the chairman of the Homeland Security Advisory Council for the U.S. government.

Bratton's policing style is influenced by the broken windows theory, a criminological theory of the norm-setting and signaling effect of urban disorder and vandalism on additional crime and anti-social behavior. He advocates having an ethnically diverse police force representative of the population, being tough on gangs and maintaining a strict policy toward anti-social behavior.

== Early life and education ==
Bratton is from the Dorchester neighborhood of Boston, Massachusetts. He attended Boston Technical High School, graduating in 1965. From there, he served in the Military Police Corps of the United States Army leaving in 1970 to pursue a career in law enforcement.

== Police career ==
=== Boston ===
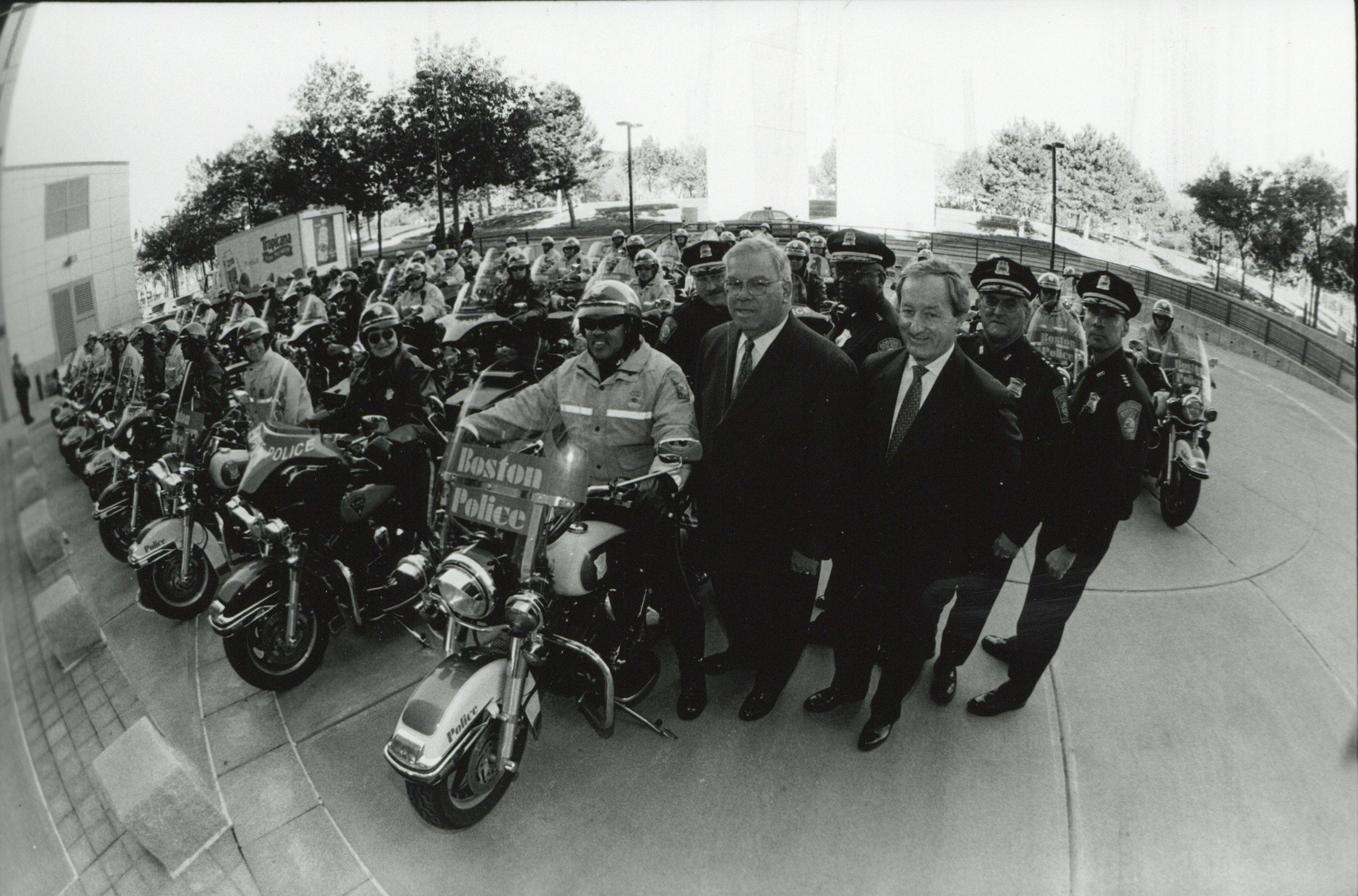
Bratton and Mayor Thomas Menino stand with officers of the Boston Police Department

Bratton returned to Boston in 1970 to start a police career in the Boston Police Department (BPD), and was sworn in as an officer in October 1970. He was promoted to sergeant in July 1975. While serving as a Boston Police Officer, Bratton earned a Bachelor of Science in Public Service/Public Administration in 1975 from Boston State College (later absorbed by the University of Massachusetts-Boston). In his early police career, he served as the partner of Francis Roache. Like Bratton, Roache also later served as Commissioner of the BPD.

In October 1980, at the age of 32 and ten years after his appointment to the BPD, Bratton was named as the youngest-ever Executive Superintendent of the Boston Police, the department's second highest post. He was dismissed as executive superintendent after he told a journalist that his goal was to be the Police Commissioner. He was reassigned to the position of Inspector of Bureaus, a sinecure which was responsible for liaison with minority and LGBTQ communities. He was later brought back into police headquarters to handle labor relations and 9-1-1 related issues.

Between 1983 and 1986, Bratton was Chief of Police for the Massachusetts Bay Transportation Authority, following which he became Superintendent of the Massachusetts Metropolitan District Commission Police. Bratton was Superintendent in Chief of the Boston Police Department from 1992 until 1993, then he became that city's 34th Police Commissioner. He holds the Department's highest award for valor.

=== New York City (first tenure) ===
Bratton became the chief of the New York City Transit Police in 1990. In 1994, Bratton was appointed the 38th Commissioner of the New York City Police Department (NYPD) by Mayor Rudy Giuliani. He cooperated with Giuliani in putting the controversial broken windows theory into practice. He introduced the CompStat system of tracking crimes in New York City. Critics have argued that CompStat has created perverse incentives for officers to allow crimes to go unreported, and has encouraged police brutality, citing that complaints by citizens that involved incidents where no arrest was made or summons was issued more than doubled during the Giuliani administration.

Bratton resigned in 1996, while under investigation by the Corporation Counsel for the propriety of a book deal that he signed while in office as well as accepting multiple unauthorized trips from corporations and individuals. These offenses were generally considered minor. Front and center were alleged personal conflicts with Giuliani, partly due to Giuliani's opposition to some of Bratton's reforms and partly due to Giuliani's belief that Bratton was getting more credit for the reduction in crime than Giuliani.

The experiences of Bratton and New York Deputy Police Commissioner Jack Maple were used as the inspiration of the television series The District.

=== Los Angeles ===
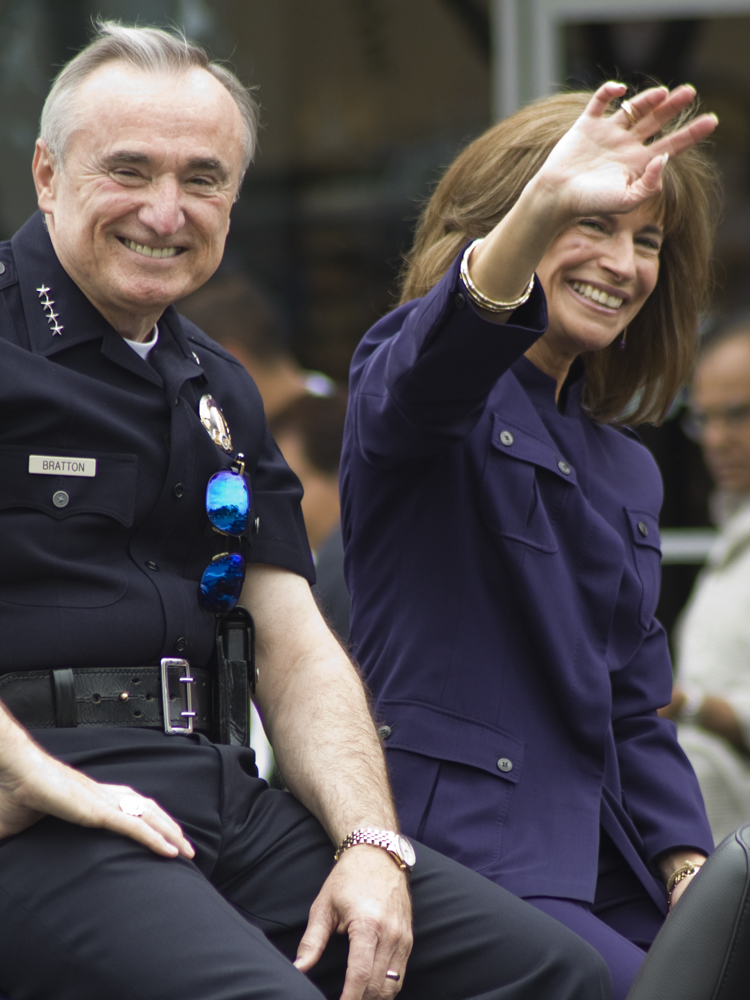
Bratton and his wife Rikki Klieman, at LA/Valley Pride in 2009

Bratton worked as a private consultant with Kroll Associates, also known as LAPD's Independent Monitor, until his appointment by the Mayor of Los Angeles James Hahn as the LAPD's 54th Chief of Police in October 2002. Bratton was one of three candidates recommended to Hahn by the Los Angeles Police Commission under Commission President Rick J. Caruso.

On June 19, 2007, the Los Angeles Police Commission reappointed Bratton to a second five-year term, the first reappointment of an LAPD chief in almost twenty years.

Bratton has been criticized for his extensive travel; in 2005, he was out of town for a full third of the year on both official and personal business.

In March 2009, Councilman Herb Wesson proposed an amendment to the City Charter, allowing Bratton to serve a third consecutive term as Police Chief.

On September 11, 2009, he was awarded with the honorary title of Commander of the Most Excellent Order of the British Empire by Queen Elizabeth II "in recognition of his work to promote cooperation between US and UK police throughout his distinguished career".

On August 12, 2011, Bratton said he was in talks with the British government to become an adviser on controlling the violence that had affected London the prior week. He said he received a phone call from U.K. Prime Minister David Cameron, and that he would continue speaking with British officials to formalize an agreement. Bratton was approached by British Prime Minister David Cameron to become the new Metropolitan Police Commissioner in July 2011, but Theresa May and the Home Office said that the commissioner was required to be a British citizen. Bratton instead was offered an advisor role to the British government, which he accepted in August 2011.

=== Oakland ===
On December 27, 2012, he was hired as a consultant for the city of Oakland, California.

=== New York City (second tenure) ===
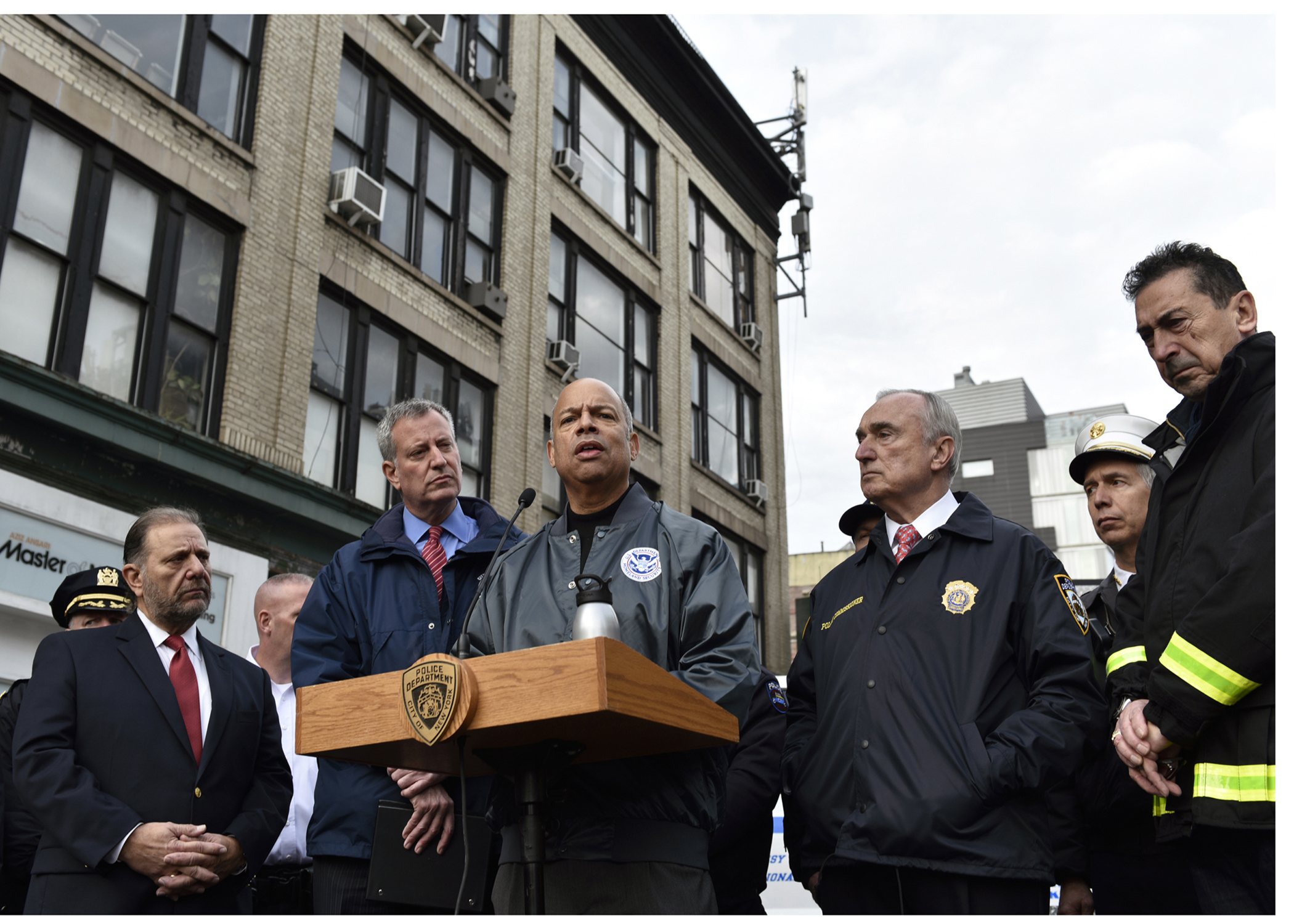
Emergency Management Comr. Joseph Esposito; NYC Mayor Bill de Blasio; U.S. Sec. of Homeland Security Jeh Johnson; Bratton; and NYFD Commissioner Daniel Nigro speak to media in 2015

On December 5, 2013, New York City mayor-elect Bill de Blasio named Bratton as New York City's new Police Commissioner to replace Raymond Kelly. The New York Times reported that at Bratton's swearing in on January 2, 2014, the new Police Commissioner praised his predecessor Raymond Kelly, but also signaled his intention to strike a more conciliatory tone with ordinary New Yorkers who had become disillusioned with policing in the city: "We will all work hard to identify why is it that so many in this city do not feel good about this department that has done so much to make them safe – what has it been about our activities that have made so many alienated?" He stepped down in 2016.

=== New Orleans ===
Following the January 1, 2025 attack on Bourbon Street the New Orleans Police Department hired William Bratton to review the city's security plans and strengthen them against future threats. Bratton worked closely with New Orleans chief Anne Kirkpatrick with funding provided by the New Orleans Police and Justice Foundation.

== Later career ==
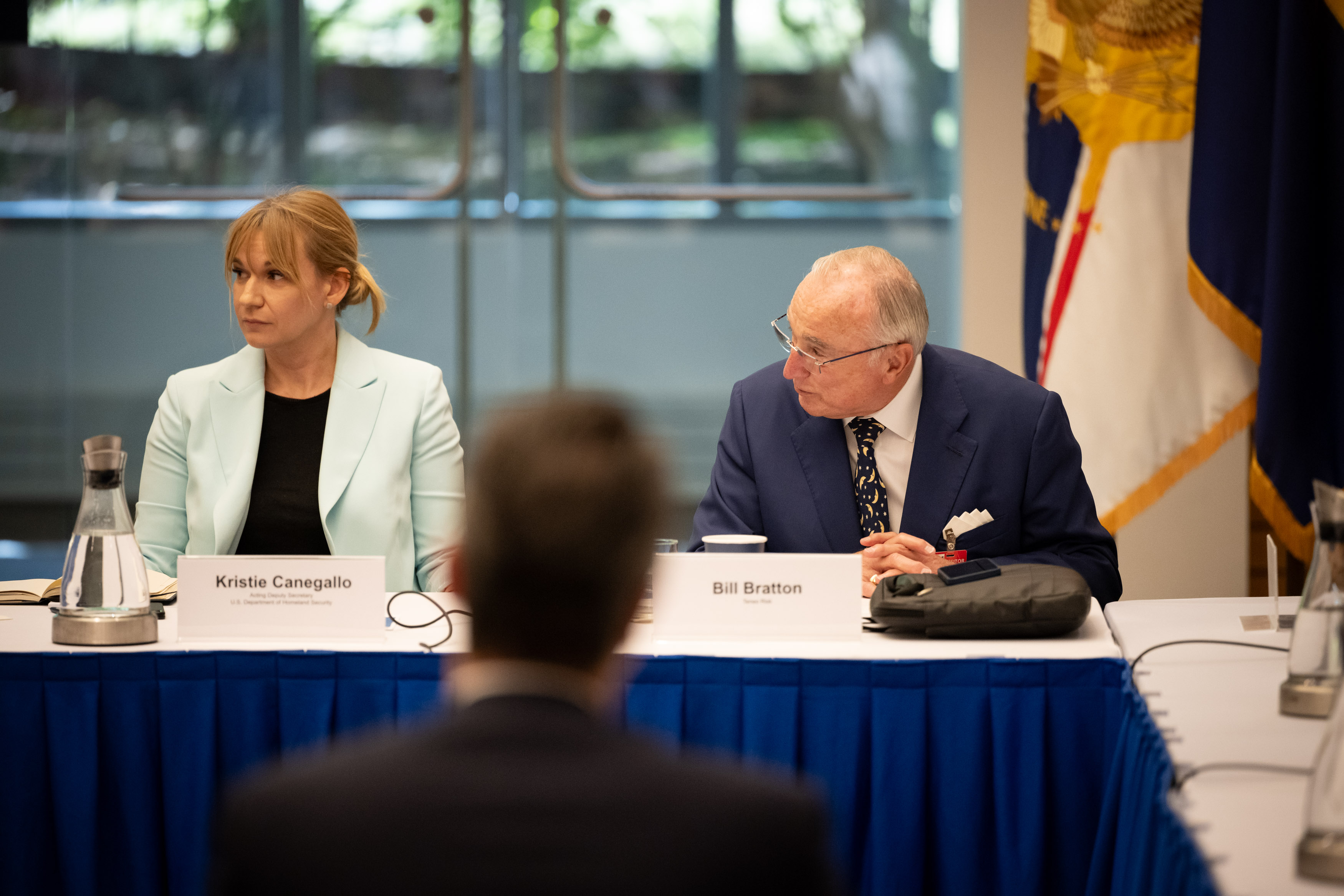
Bratton (right) at a 2023 meeting of the Homeland Security Advisory Council

Bratton co-founded and served as CEO of Bratton Technologies, which operates BlueLine, a law enforcement communications network modeled after LinkedIn.

In 2009, after stepping down from his post in Los Angeles, Bratton moved back to New York City to take a position with private security firm Altegrity Risk International.

On September 16, 2010, Bratton became the chairman of Altegrity, a corporate risk consulting firm that declared bankruptcy after defrauding the US Government of millions of dollars. On November 9, 2012, he stepped down as chairman and was retained as a Senior Adviser.

In 2010, Bratton was sworn in as a new member of the Homeland Security Advisory Council.

On November 5, 2012, Bratton joined Crest Advisory, a UK-based law enforcement consulting firm.

In 2016, Bratton joined the CEO-advisory company Teneo Holdings as Senior Managing Director and Executive Chairman of their Teneo Risk division, which specializes in computer security, infrastructure security, corporate security, smart city planning, emergency management, and counterterrorism.

In May 2018, Bratton was appointed to the Board of Directors of Mission Ready Solutions Inc., a company specialized in providing comprehensive government contracting solutions.

== Policing style ==
Bratton is a key proponent of "broken windows" policing. Some media sources have described his policy as "zero tolerance" policing, but Bratton denies this. Bratton has called "zero tolerance" a "troublesome" term. Bratton and George L. Kelling wrote a joint essay in which they outlined a difference between the two:

Critics use the term "zero tolerance" in a pejorative sense to suggest that Broken Windows policing is a form of zealotry—the imposition of rigid, moralistic standards of behavior on diverse populations. It is not. Broken Windows is a highly discretionary police activity that requires careful training, guidelines, and supervision, as well as an ongoing dialogue with neighborhoods and communities to ensure that it is properly conducted.

The central theory behind broken windows policing is that low-level crime and disorder creates an environment that encourages more serious crimes. Bratton and Kelling also argue that low-level disorder is often a greater worry to residents than major crimes, and that different ethnic groups have similar ideas as to what "disorder" is. He and Kelling advocate both effective enforcement and lenient punishment for minor crimes. Citing fare evasion as an example, they argue that the police should attempt to catch fare evaders, and that the vast majority should be summoned to court rather than arrested and given a punishment other than jail. The goal is to deter minor offenders from committing more serious crimes in the future and reduce the prison population in the long run.

Bratton also supports community policing, describing it as being related to broken windows policing. He and Kelling stress the need for the police to collaborate with other government agencies and a variety of community groups, writing that "many of the challenges to public order confronting cities and communities cannot be solved by simple police action."

Bratton has stated that racial tensions and distrust of the police are hindrances to reducing crime. Bratton's solution in Los Angeles and New York City was to make police forces more ethnically diverse and "reflective of the ethnic make-up of their cities". Bratton argues that stop-and-frisk is a useful tool that should be used in moderation. Use of stop-and-frisk was increased during his first term as NYPD Commissioner and dramatically reduced during his second term. Bratton supported reducing it on the grounds that it was causing tension between the police and minority groups and that it was less needed in an era of lower crime.

=== Memoir ===
In 1998, Random House published his memoir Turnaround: How America's Top Cop Reversed the Crime Epidemic, written with co-author Peter Knobler. It was named a New York Times Notable Book of the Year. His most recent book, The Profession: A Memoir of Community, Race, and the Arc of Policing in America, also written with Knobler, was a 2021 New York Times Book Review Editors' Choice.

== Personal life ==
Bratton holds a Bachelor of Science in Law Enforcement from the University of Massachusetts Boston and was a research fellow at the John F. Kennedy School of Government, Harvard University.

Bratton has been married four times. He is currently married to attorney and TruTV analyst Rikki Klieman, and has one son, David, from a prior marriage. Bratton was previously married to attorney and Boston Police spokeswoman and newscaster Cheryl Fiandaca.

Bratton addressed the Roger Williams University graduating class at the May 22, 2010 commencement ceremony and also received an honorary degree during the ceremony. He also received an honorary degree from New York Institute of Technology.

After more than 40 years in policing, Bill Bratton retired from law enforcement in 2016. As of 2018, he is currently the Executive Chairman of Teneo Risk Holdings and is on the Board of Directors for Mission Ready Solutions.

Bratton is a Roman Catholic.

== See also ==
- The District

Police appointments
Preceded by Joseph Saia	Superintendent in Chief of the Boston Police Department; 1992–1993	Succeeded by Paul Evans
Preceded by Francis Roache	Commissioner of the Boston Police Department; 1993–1994	Succeeded by Paul Evans
Preceded by Ray Kelly	Police Commissioner of New York City; 1994–1996	Succeeded by Howard Safir
Preceded by Martin Pomeroy; Acting	Chief of Police of Los Angeles; 2002–2009	Succeeded by Michael Downing; Acting
Preceded by Ray Kelly	Police Commissioner of New York City; 2014–2016	Succeeded by James P. O'Neill
Government offices
Preceded by William H. Webster	Chair of the Homeland Security Advisory Council; 2020-Present	Incumbent
