= Michael P. Downing =

American Los Angeles police chief in 2009

Interim Chief of Police of Los Angeles
- In office October 30, 2009 – November 17, 2009
- Preceded by: William J. Bratton
- Succeeded by: Charles L. Beck

Michael P. Downing is an American police officer who served as the interim Chief of Police of the Los Angeles Police Department. On August 5, 2009, Chief William J. Bratton announced that after seven years as chief, he would be stepping down from his position. Bratton continued to serve as LAPD chief until October 30, 2009. After Bratton stepped down, Downing was appointed as Chief of Police by the L.A. Board of Police Commissioners. As of January 2014, Downing is a 29-year veteran of the Department.

On November 17, 2009, the Los Angeles City Council approved Charles L. Beck as the new LAPD Chief of Police. He was sworn in as the 56th chief.

Police appointments
Preceded by William J. Bratton	Interim Chief of LAPD; 2009	Succeeded by Charles L. Beck
