= Alison Flowers =

American journalist

Alison Flowers is an American journalist who investigates violence, police conduct and justice. In 2024, she won a Pulitzer Prize for Audio Reporting and a Peabody Award as part of the production team for "You Didn't See Nothin", which was also named one of The 100 Best Podcasts of All Time.” She was also a finalist for a Pulitzer Prize for Audio Reporting in 2021 for her work on the podcast Somebody, which tells the story of Shapearl Wells, mother of Courtney Copeland who was killed outside a Chicago police station in 2016. She won an Emmy for her work on the SHOWTIME documentary 16 Shots and is the author of Exoneree Diaries: The Fight for Innocence, Independence and Identity (Haymarket Books, 2016), a portrait of four exonerated criminals.

== Early life and education ==
Alison Flowers earned a Master's degree from the Medill School of Journalism in 2009. She is also an alumna of The OpEd Project and a volunteer mentor for GlobalGirl Media, working with four student journalists to tackle the subject of gun rights and violence in the city.

== Career ==
Flowers reported for WBEZ in 2013 and 2014. In 2015, Flowers worked as a Social Justice News Nexus Fellow at Northwestern University. Her piece "Trying to Keep on Growing" was featured as the Purple Prose in the university's Summer 2016 magazine.

In 2019, she co-produced a SHOWTIME documentary 16 Shots, which examines the shooting and subsequent police cover-up of 17-year-old Laquan McDonald by Chicago police officer Jason Van Dyke. The documentary was directed by Richard Rowley. In The New York Times, Ken Jaworowski wrote that despite the fact that the case was extensively covered by the media, 16 Shots “remains valuable as a record of past events that hold sway over the present.”

Flowers produced a seven-part investigative podcast Somebody, which examines the mysterious 2016 murder of unarmed Courtney Copeland in Chicago. Somebody premiered on March 31, 2020 and was a Pulitzer Prize finalist in 2021.

She is the author of Exoneree Diaries: The Fight for Innocence, Independence and Identity (Haymarket Books, 2016), a portrait of four exonerated criminals. In an interview with the non-profit news organization Truthout's editor-in-chief Maya Schenwar, Flowers said her inspiration to focus on life after exoneration came from her work at an innocence project at Northwestern University. Schenwar wrote that Exoneree Diaries "is a revealing and compassionate look at the brutal truths behind the release of exonerees from prison". In Chicago Reader, senior writer Steve Bogira wrote: "We need journalists with Flowers's ability and compassion to tell the stories of the many guilty convicts whose chief offense was being born into deprivation—a crime for which too few are ever exonerated."

Flowers has written for The Guardian, The Intercept, The Village Voice, Time, The Daily Beast, Vice, and the Chicago Reader, among other outlets.

Her journalism has also contributed to the release of two innocent people in prison: Jennifer Del Prete, in partnership with the Medill Justice Project, and Robert Johnson, in partnership with the Invisible Institute.

Flowers worked at the nonprofit journalism organization the Invisible Institute from 2015 to 2023, where she led investigations and productions.

== Awards and honors ==
In 2021, Flowers was a finalist for the Pulitzer Prize in audio reporting for her work on the seven-part investigative podcast Somebody. The podcast also received numerous accolades, including the podcasting award from the American Society of Magazine Editors, the Scripps Howard audio award, and Best Audio Documentary from the International Documentary Association. Somebody also received recognition from The New York Times, Rolling Stone, and The Atlantic.

In 2019, Flowers won an Emmy for Outstanding Investigative Documentary and received Television Academy Honors for her work as a co-producer on the SHOWTIME documentary 16 Shots on the police killing of Laquan McDonald.

She is a two-time winner of the Hillman Foundation's Sidney Award, a monthly award for outstanding investigative journalism that fosters social and economic justice.

Flowers was also a finalist for the 2014 Online Journalism Award for her book Exoneree Diaries, which details the lives of four exonerated prisoners in Cook County, Illinois.
