= 2020 Pulitzer Prize =

Awards for journalism and related fields

The 2020 Pulitzer Prizes were awarded by the Pulitzer Prize Board for work during the 2019 calendar year. Prize winners and nominated finalists were initially scheduled to be announced by Pulitzer administrator Dana Canedy on April 20, 2020, but were delayed due to the COVID-19 pandemic, and instead announced by Canedy in a video presentation on May 4, 2020.

== Prizes ==
Winners and finalists are listed below, with winners marked in bold.

=== Journalism ===
Public Service
**The Anchorage Daily News** with contributions from ProPublica, for "a riveting series that revealed a third of Alaska's villages had no police protection, took authorities to task for decades of neglect, and spurred an influx of money and legislative changes."
The New York Times, for "exemplary reporting that exposed the breadth and impact of a political war on science, including systematic dismantling of federal regulations and policy."
The Washington Post, for "groundbreaking, data-driven journalism that used previously hidden government records and confidential company documents to provide unprecedented insight into America's deadly opioid epidemic."

Breaking News Reporting
**The Courier-Journal** **staff**, For its rapid coverage of hundreds of last-minute pardons by Kentucky's governor, showing how the process was marked by opacity, racial disparities and violations of legal norms. (Moved by the jury from Local Reporting, where it was originally entered.)"
Staff of the Los Angeles Times for "committed coverage of an epic California wildfire that consumed more than 18,000 buildings in 150,000 acres, and took 86 lives. (Moved by the jury from Local Reporting, where it was originally entered.)"
Staff of The Washington Post, for "incisive coverage of back-to-back mass shootings in El Paso, Texas and Dayton, Ohio that contextualized these events for a national audience."

Investigative Reporting
**Brian M. Rosenthal of** **The New York Times**, for "an exposé of New York City's taxi industry that showed how lenders profited from predatory loans that shattered the lives of vulnerable drivers, reporting that ultimately led to state and federal investigations and sweeping reforms."
Jay Hancock and Elizabeth Lucas Kaiser of Kaiser Health News, for "exposing predatory bill collection by the University of Virginia Health System that relentlessly squeezed low-income patients—many into bankruptcy—forcing the non-profit, state-run hospital to change its tactics."
Staff of The Wall Street Journal, for "an exhaustive investigation into Amazon, the world's largest retailer, that revealed a largely unregulated and highly profitable third-party flea market and the potentially deadly results of it peddling of unsafe and banned products."

Explanatory Reporting
**The Washington Post** **staff**, for "a groundbreaking series that showed with scientific clarity the dire effects of extreme temperatures on the planet."
Rosanna Xia, Swetha Kannan and Terry Castleman of the Los Angeles Times for "a deeply researched examination of the difficult choices Californians must make as climate change erodes precious coastline."
Staff of Reveal from The Center for Investigative Reporting for "its industrious reporting on worker injuries and the human toll of robotics technology at Amazon warehouses across the United States."

Local Reporting
**The Baltimore Sun** **staff**, for "illuminating, impactful reporting on a lucrative, undisclosed financial relationship between the city's mayor and the public hospital system she helped to oversee."
Peter Smith, Stephanie Strasburg, and Shelley Bradbury of The Pittsburgh Post-Gazette, for "an unprecedented investigation of child sexual abuse and cover-ups in the insular Amish and Mennonite communities."
Staff of The Boston Globe, for "its engaging approach to exposing socioeconomic inequities by surveying the city's brightest public high school students a decade after graduation."

National Reporting
**Dominic Gates, Steve Miletich, Mike Baker and Lewis Kamb of** **The Seattle Times**, for "groundbreaking stories that exposed design flaws in the Boeing 737 MAX that led to two deadly crashes and revealed failures in government oversight."
**T. Christian Miller, Megan Rose and Robert Faturechi of ProPublica**, for "their investigation into America's 7th Fleet after a series of deadly naval accidents in the Pacific."
Staff of The Wall Street Journal for "revelatory work showing how a California utility's neglect of its equipment caused countless wildfires, including one that wiped out the town of Paradise and killed 85 people."

International Reporting
**Staff of** **The New York Times**, for "a set of enthralling stories, reported at great risk, exposing the predations of Vladimir Putin's regime."
Staff of Reuters, for "a series of deeply-reported, original dispatches from the Hong Kong protests, a battleground between democracy and autocracy that detailed China's grip behind the scenes and offered valuable insights into the forces that will shape the next century."
Staff of The New York Times, for "gripping accounts that disclosed China's top-secret efforts to repress millions of Muslims through a system of labor camps, brutality and surveillance."

Feature Writing
**Ben Taub of The New Yorker**, for "a devastating account of a man who was kidnapped, tortured and deprived of his liberty for more than a decade at the Guantanamo Bay detention facility, blending on-the-ground reporting and lyrical prose to offer a nuanced perspective on America's wider war on terror."
Chloé Cooper Jones, freelance reporter for The Verge, for "her gripping portrait of Ramsey Orta, who recorded the NYPD killing of Eric Garner, using restrained yet powerful language and courageous reporting to show the police retribution endured by a forgotten figure in a story that horrified the nation."
Ellen Barry of The New York Times, for "a beautifully written tale of an Indian "prince" whose story concealed deeper truths rooted in the violence and trauma of the Partition of India."
Nestor Ramos of The Boston Globe, for "a sweeping yet intimate story about how climate change is drastically reshaping Cape Cod, locally illustrating the urgent global crisis."

Commentary
**Nikole Hannah-Jones of** **The New York Times**, for "a sweeping, deeply reported and personal essay for the ground-breaking 1619 Project, which seeks to place the enslavement of Africans at the center of America's story, prompting public conversation about the nation's founding and evolution."
Sally Jenkins of The Washington Post, for "columns that marshal a broad knowledge of history and culture to remind the sports world of its responsibility to uphold basic values of equity, fairness and tolerance."
Steve Lopez of the Los Angeles Times, for "purposeful columns about rising homelessness in Los Angeles, which amplified calls for government action to deal with a long-visible public crisis."

Criticism
**Christopher Knight of the Los Angeles Times,** for "work demonstrating extraordinary community service by a critic, applying his expertise and enterprise to critique a proposed overhaul of the L.A. County Museum of Art and its effect on the institution's mission."
Justin Davidson of New York, for "architecture reviews marked by a keen eye, deep knowledge and exquisite writing, as exemplified by his essay on Manhattan's Hudson Yards development.
Soraya Nadia McDonald of The Undefeated, for "essays on theater and film that bring a fresh, delightful intelligence to the intersections of race and art."

Editorial Writing
**Jeffrey Gerritt of the** **Palestine Herald-Press**, for "editorials that exposed how pre-trial inmates died horrific deaths in a small Texas county jail—reflecting a rising trend across the state—and courageously took on the local sheriff and judicial establishment, which tried to cover up these needless tragedies."
Jill Burcum of the Star Tribune, for "passionate, persuasive writing about a pristine wilderness area, accessible largely by canoe, to demonstrate to readers why a proposed mine would do incalculable environmental damage."
Melinda Henneberger of The Kansas City Star, for "her fierce and unflinching defense of the women of Missouri on issues of abortion access, sexual assault and domestic violence."

Editorial Cartooning
**Barry Blitt, contributor for The New Yorker**, for "work that skewers the personalities and policies emanating from the Trump White House with deceptively sweet watercolor style and seemingly gentle caricatures."
Kevin Kallaugher, freelancer, for "combining classically beautiful cartoon art and incisive wit to create a striking portfolio addressing the Trump administration, international affairs and local Baltimore politics."
Lalo Alcaraz, freelancer, for "irreverent and poignant cartoon commentary focused on local and national issues from a distinctly Latinx perspective."
Matt Bors of The Nib, for "cartoons that sliced through the hypocrisy of the Trump presidency, as well as the blind spots of moderate Democrats in a distinct, contemporary style."

Breaking News Photography
**The photography staff of Reuters**, for "wide-ranging and illuminating photographs of Hong Kong as citizens protested infringement of their civil liberties and defended the region's autonomy by the Chinese government."
Noah Berger, John Locher and Ringo H. W. Chiu of Associated Press, for "images from Haiti, conveying the horrors of lynching, murder and human rights abuses as the country wrestles with ongoing unrest.".
Tom Fox of The Dallas Morning News, for "coverage of a would-be shooter outside Dallas' Earle Cabell Federal Building, which houses federal courts, photographed at great personal risk."

Feature Photography
**Channi Anand, Mukhtar Khan and Dar Yasin of** **Associated Press**, for "striking images of life in the contested territory of Kashmir as India revoked its independence, executed through a communications blackout."
Erin Clark of The Boston Globe, for "respectful and compassionate photography of a working Maine family as it falls into homelessness and finds new housing, albeit precarious."
Mary F. Calvert, freelance, for "work published by The New York Times and Yahoo News that look intimately at male sexual assault survivors in the armed forces, and the lasting effects of trauma on them and their families."

Audio Reporting
**Staff of This American Life with Molly O'Toole of the Los Angeles Times and Emily Green, freelancer, Vice News**, for "'The Out Crowd,' revelatory, intimate journalism that illuminates the personal impact of the Trump Administration's "Remain in Mexico" policy."
Andrew Beck Grace, Chip Brantley, Graham Smith, Nicole Beemsterboer and Robert Little of NPR, for "White Lies, a riveting seven-episode podcast that doggedly reinvestigated one of the most infamous murders of the Civil Rights era."
Nigel Poor, Earlonne Woods and Rahsaan Thomas for "Ear Hustle, a consistently surprising and beautifully crafted series on life behind bars produced by inmates of San Quentin State Prison."

=== Letters, Drama, and Music ===
Fiction
**The Nickel Boys**, by **Colson Whitehead**, a "spare and devastating exploration of abuse at a reform school in Jim Crow-era Florida that is ultimately a powerful tale of human perseverance, dignity and redemption."
The Dutch House, by Ann Patchett, a "masterful and beautifully rendered allegory of the destructive force of social ambition on several generations of a Pennsylvania family."
The Topeka School, by Ben Lerner, a "brilliant and ambitious exploration of language, family and American identity as exemplified by the life of a Midwestern high school debate champion."

Drama
**A Strange Loop**, by **Michael R. Jackson**, a "metafictional musical that tracks the creative process of an artist transforming issues of identity, race, and sexuality that once pushed him to the margins of the cultural mainstream into a meditation on universal human fears and insecurities."
Heroes of the Fourth Turning, by Will Arbery, a "scrupulously hewn drama centering on four alumni of a conservative Catholic college who confront themselves and each other, clashing over theology, politics and personal responsibility."
Soft Power, by David Henry Hwang and Jeanine Tesori, a "multi-layered and mischievous musical that deconstructs a beloved, original American art form to examine the promise and the limits of representation in both the theatrical and political senses of the word."

History
**Sweet Taste of Liberty: A True Story of Slavery and Restitution in America**, by **W. Caleb McDaniel**, a "masterfully researched meditation on reparations based on the remarkable story of a 19th century woman who survived kidnapping and re-enslavement to sue her captor."
Race for Profit: How Banks and the Real Estate Industry Undermined Black Homeownership, by Keeanga-Yamahtta Taylor, a "deeply researched and rigorously argued account of the public-private partnership that replaced redlining with even more predatory and destructive practices."
The End of the Myth: From the Frontier to the Border Wall in the Mind of America, by Greg Grandin, a "sweeping and beautifully written book that probes the American myth of boundless expansion and provides a compelling context for thinking about the current political moment (moved by the Board to the General Nonfiction category, where it was also entered.)"

Biography or Autobiography
**Sontag: Her Life and Work**, by **Benjamin Moser**, an "authoritatively constructed work told with pathos and grace, that captures the writer's genius and humanity alongside her addictions, sexual ambiguities and volatile enthusiasms."
Our Man: Richard Holbrooke and the End of the American Century, by George Packer, an "inventive, compulsively readable life of a complicated man of considerable talents and personal failings that offers extraordinary insights into the inner workings of Washington's foreign policy establishment."
Parisian Lives: Samuel Beckett, Simone de Beauvoir, And Me, by Deirdre Bair, a "tale of authorial ambition, self-doubt and achievement that offers intriguing insight into the world of two of the 20th century's literary giants and the art of biography itself."

Poetry
**The Tradition**, by **Jericho Brown**, a "collection of masterful lyrics that combine delicacy with historical urgency in their loving evocation of bodies vulnerable to hostility and violence."
Dunce, by Mary Ruefle, "poems of wildness and wit that swerve away from the predictable as they balance comedy and melancholy."
Only as the Day Is Long: New and Selected Poems, by Dorianne Laux, "poetic narratives of plainspoken authenticity with characters whose breadth spans the wide range of American life."

General Nonfiction
**The End of the Myth: From the Frontier to the Border Wall in the Mind of America**, by **Greg Grandin**, a "sweeping and beautifully written book that probes the American myth of boundless expansion and provides a compelling context for thinking about the current political moment. (Moved by the Board from the History category.)"
**The Undying: Pain, Vulnerability, Mortality, Medicine, Art, Time, Dreams, Data, Exhaustion, Cancer, and Care**, by **Anne Boyer**, an "elegant and unforgettable narrative about the brutality of illness and the capitalism of cancer care in America."
Elderhood: Redefining Aging, Transforming Medicine, Reimagining Life, by Louise Aronson, an "empathetic and nuanced critique, informed by the author's decades of experience as a geriatrician, of the ways in which our society and healthcare system neglect, stereotype and mistreat the elderly."
Solitary, by Albert Woodfox with Leslie George, an "unflinching indictment of Louisiana's most notorious prison and the racist criminal justice system as told through an innocent man's redemptive journey faced with a life sentence in solitary confinement."

Music
**The Central Park Five**, by **Anthony Davis**, "a courageous operatic work, marked by powerful vocal writing and sensitive orchestration, that skillfully transforms a notorious example of contemporary injustice into something empathetic and hopeful. Libretto by Richard Wesley."
and all the days were purple, by Alex Weiser, a "song cycle for voice, piano, percussion and string trio, based on poems in Yiddish and English, a meditative and deeply spiritual work whose unexpected musical language is arresting and directly emotional."
Sky: Concerto for Violin, by Michael Torke, an "a composition that merges traditions of bluegrass and classical music through the musical instrument common to both forms, a virtuosic work of astonishing beauty, expert pacing and generous optimism."

== Special citations ==
One special citation was awarded in 2020, as follows:

Special Citations
Ida B. Wells, for "her outstanding and courageous reporting on the horrific and vicious violence against African Americans during the era of lynching."
