= Paul Mezey =

American film producer

Paul S. Mezey is a New York-based independent producer and founder of Journeyman Pictures. He has produced a number of critically acclaimed films including Maria Full of Grace which received a 2005 Academy Award Nomination for Best Actress in a Leading Role and Half Nelson starring Ryan Gosling which received a 2007 Academy Award Nomination for Best Actor in a Leading Role. Mezey also worked as a producer on the 2021 film Marcel the Shell with Shoes on, alongside Elisabeth Holm. The film was nominated for an Academy Award for Best Animated Feature Film.

Mezey produced Azazel Jacobs’ Momma’s Man which premiered alongside Sugar at the 2008 Sundance Film Festival. He recently wrapped production on the film Cold Souls starring Paul Giamatti, Emily Watson, and David Strathairn. Projects currently in development include David Riker’s The Girl starring Emily Blunt and Joshua Marston’s upcoming feature The Fortress of Solitude, based on Jonathan Lethem’s National Bestseller.

Other films produced by Mezey include: Angel Rodriguez (HBO Films), Everyday People (HBO Films), Spring Forward (IFC Films), Our Song (IFC Films), The City (La Ciudad) directed by David Riker, Mississippi Blues documentary You See Me Laughin’ directed by Mandy Stein, and The Ballad of Ramblin’ Jack directed by Aiyana Elliott, winner of the Artistic Achievement Award for documentary film at the 2000 Sundance Film Festival. Mezey received the IFP/West Motorola Producer's Award at the Independent Spirit Awards in 2001 and was selected by Variety in 2004 as one of the "Ten Producers to Watch".
