= Jamie Kalven =

American journalist (born 1948)

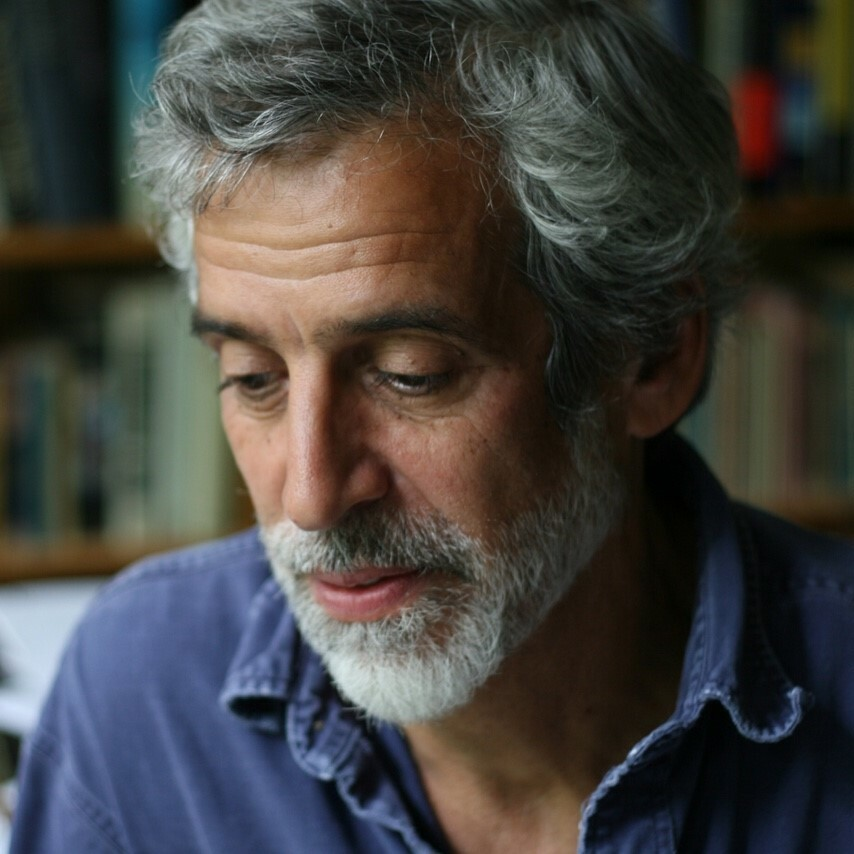
- Kalven in 2016
- Born: James Ewan Kalven; 1948 (age 77–78); Chicago, Illinois, U.S.
- Education: Wesleyan University
- Occupations: Journalist; author; activist
- Known for: Kalven v. City of Chicago; Founding the Invisible Institute
- Spouse: Patricia Evans (m. 1977)
- Father: Harry Kalven

James Ewan Kalven (born 1948) is an American journalist, author, human rights activist, and community organizer based in Chicago, Illinois. He is the founder of the Invisible Institute, a non-profit journalism organization based in Chicago's South Side. His work in the city has included reporting on police misconduct and poor conditions of public housing. Kalven has been referred to as a "guerrilla journalist" by Chicago journalist Studs Terkel.

He is the son of Harry Kalven, a law professor who left behind an unfinished manuscript on freedom of speech upon his death in 1974. Jamie finished the manuscript over the following 14 years. Following a sexual assault on his wife, Patricia Evans, Kalven wrote a memoir as a resource to support victims of rape. He also reported on living conditions at the Stateway Gardens housing development in the Bronzeville neighborhood of Chicago. Along with Evans and an associate, Kalven founded the Invisible Institute as an informal journalism and community organizing team at Stateway. His reporting on abuse by Chicago police at Stateway eventually led to litigation seeking the release of police misconduct records, which Kalven won in 2014. The case – Kalven v. City of Chicago – resulted in a landmark decision, holding that police misconduct records are public information under the Illinois Freedom of Information Act.

Having obtained the police records, the Invisible Institute incorporated as a nonprofit organization soon thereafter. The Institute created the Citizens Police Data Project and became a hub for information related to police misconduct, wrongful convictions, and reports from police whistleblowers. Kalven reported on the murder of Laquan McDonald by a police officer in 2014. He obtained a copy of an autopsy report showing that McDonald had been shot 16 times execution-style, contradicting official reports of a single gunshot wound. Kalven won the Ridenhour Courage Prize for this reporting. He later co-produced 16 Shots, a documentary about McDonald's murder. The Institute won the Pulitzer Prize for National Reporting in 2021, and Kalven stepped down as director in the same year.

== Personal life and early career ==
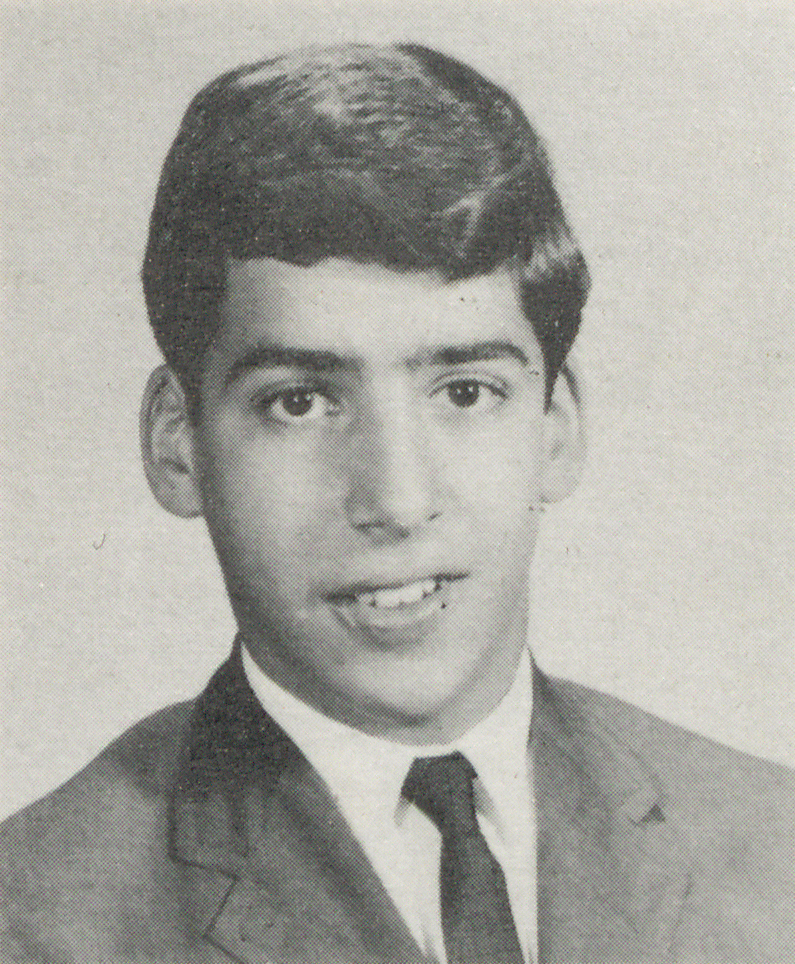
Kalven's yearbook photo at the University of Chicago Laboratory Schools in 1965

James Ewan Kalven, born 1948 in Chicago, grew up in the city's Kenwood neighborhood and is a lifelong resident of its South Side. He was the oldest of four children, growing up in a secular Jewish family. His father was Harry Kalven Jr., an alumnus of and law professor at the University of Chicago Law School, and his mother was Betty Kalven (née Rymer; died 2011). Jamie attended high school at the University of Chicago Laboratory Schools, graduating in 1965. Afterwards, he graduated from Wesleyan University in 1969. Jamie once traveled from Paris to New Delhi by motorcycle. He was an avid mountaineer, having climbed mountains in the Western U.S., Yukon, Europe, and the Himalayas. During the Indo-Pakistani War of 1971, he interrupted his trip to the Himalayas to visit Bangladesh, which led him to give up mountaineering to become a journalist. By his mid-20s, Kalven intended to pursue a career as a foreign correspondent focused on Asia.

His father, Harry, died in 1974 at the age of 60, leaving behind an unfinished manuscript on legal theories underlying freedom of speech. At the time, Jamie was living in San Francisco with his future wife, photographer Patricia Evans, whom he married in 1977. Upon his father's death, Kalven paused his freelance writing career and spent the following 14 years working on the manuscript, which was eventually completed and published by Harper & Row in 1988 as A Worthy Tradition: Freedom of Speech in America. He had reviewed annotations on the drafts and consulted notes from Harry's former students. The young journalist also occasionally traveled to New Haven, Connecticut, to discuss the book with Owen M. Fiss, a professor at Yale Law School and Harry's former colleague at the University of Chicago. During this project, Kalven supported his family – Evans and their two children – through freelance writing and work as a handyman and house painter. The book was also supported by foundation grants, the first coming from the Playboy Foundation. Benno C. Schmidt Jr., president of Yale University, described the younger Kalven's work as "an extraordinary act of intellectual and filial devotion".

In 1988, Kalven was teaching creative writing at Northwestern University, and planned to write a book about civil liberties. He also intended to resume freelance writing.

== Rape victim and violence prevention activism ==
After finishing his father's book, Kalven became drawn to stories and communities in Chicago. On September 21, 1988, his wife, Patricia Evans, was beaten and sexually assaulted while jogging during the daytime along the lakefront by their home in Hyde Park. Evans, aged 45 at the time, was traumatized for at least 10 years. As a professional photographer, she took photos of rape victims and helped tell their stories for the "Voices and Faces" project. The attack prompted Kalven to investigate the drivers of violence, poverty, and racial divisions in America; Evans is white, and her assailant was black. Kalven thus wrote a memoir, Working with Available Light: A Family's World After Violence. Published in 1999, the book has been a resource for rape counselors, victims, and their families seeking to understand the emotional aftermath of sexual assaults. Kalven faced criticism for sharing intimate details of his and Evans's lives, especially writing as a man in a field that mainly affects women. The book also prompted debate over the role, if any, men should play. Nonetheless, Rape Victim Advocates (RVA), a Chicago-based advocacy and counseling organization, praised Kalven for sharing the perspective of a partner of a victim, uncommon in works about sexual violence. In 2005, he was honored by RVA for his work supporting sexual assault survivors and violence prevention. Chicago journalist Studs Terkel, a friend of Kalven and his late father Harry, presented the award.

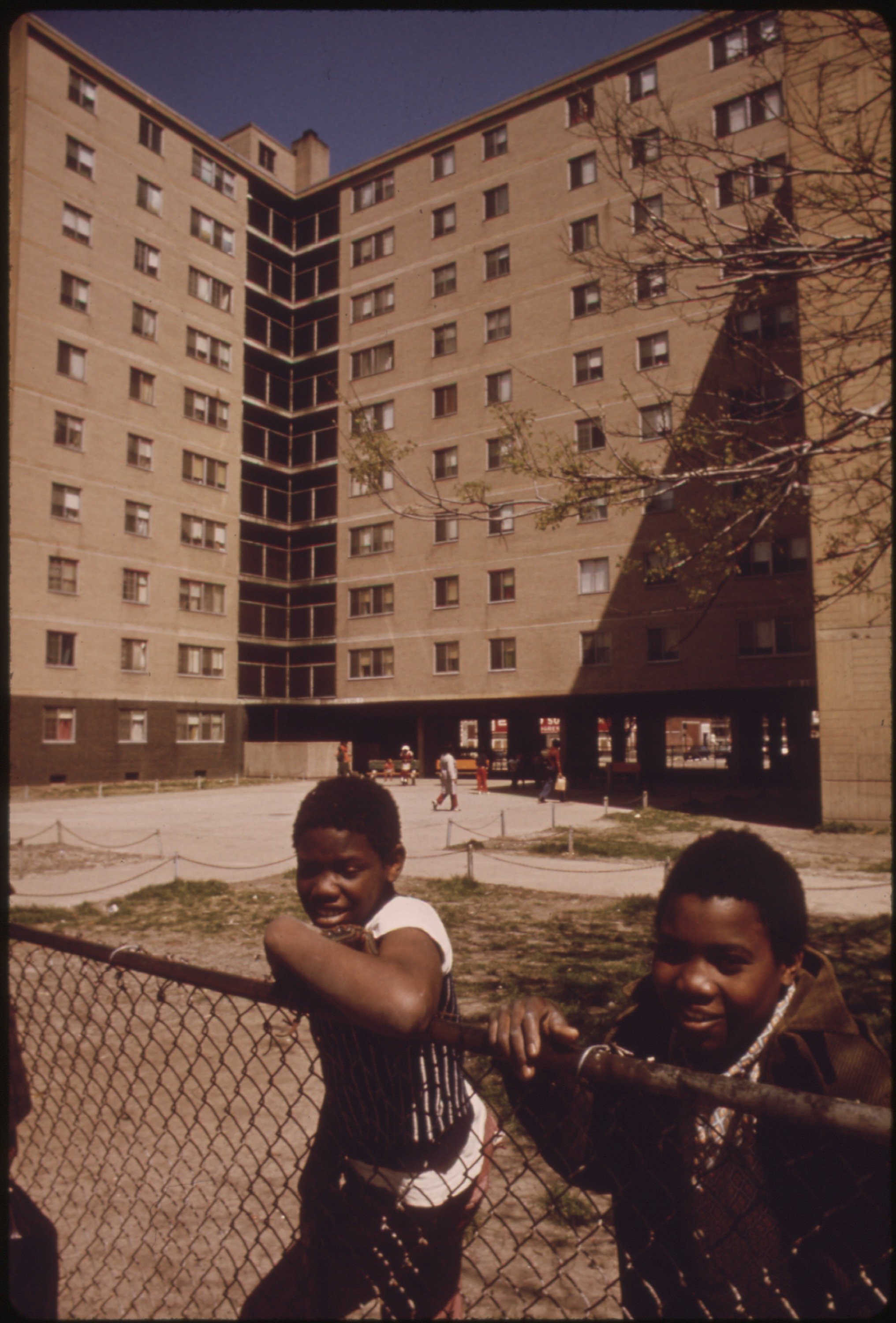
Youth at the Stateway Gardens housing project in 1973

Starting in 1993, Kalven and other community organizers held monthly gatherings, called "Vigil Against Violence", in which attendees would mourn victims of urban violence by reading the names of those killed in the South Side. The gatherings took place at the Stateway Gardens housing development in Bronzeville. At the time, Stateway was one of the city's most violent and poorest areas. The vigil gathered for around five years, after which Kalven continued his involvement at Stateway. He helped rehabilitate vacant lots into gardens and parks, and in 1997 he founded the Neighborhood Conservation Corps, which offered job training and social services.

Terkel once referred to Kalven as a "guerrilla journalist"; Kalven concurs with the use of that term. However, he has been criticized for holding dual roles as an activist and a journalist. His work has included reporting on police misconduct and poor conditions of public housing. In the mid-1990s, after years of reporting on Stateway, he became a formal advisor to the housing project's resident council, supporting negotiations with government agencies and private developers. Around 2000–2001, Kalven, his wife Evans, and computer developer David Eads started the Invisible Institute as an informal team focused on journalism and community organizing. Eads developed the website that published Kalven's reporting and Evans's photographic documentation. They occupied an empty apartment in Stateway, reporting on abusive policing at the housing project through their photojournalism blog and webzine, The View from the Ground. The "Invisible Institute" was a fictitious name for the blog's publisher. The team funded itself through a separate handyman business that also employed Stateway residents. A loose association of collaborators working on race and poverty issues in Chicago would eventually help expand the team even further. This included civil rights attorneys and law students at the Mandel Legal Aid Clinic, a legal clinic at the University of Chicago Law School.

In April 2003, a black Stateway resident, Diane Bond, was allegedly attacked and harassed by a group of white Chicago police officers called the "Skullcap Crew". According to Bond, the officers forcibly entered her apartment, beat her, and terrorized her, her son, and others. They threatened to plant drugs on her and forced her to display her genitals, purportedly in search of drugs. The officers also forced Bond's son to attack another man in the building. Kalven had been investigating stories of other alleged abuses by the Skullcap Crew over several years, and he was dissatisfied with how the police department handled his complaints. He persuaded Craig Futterman, an attorney at the Mandel Clinic, to represent Bond. The clinic filed a federal civil rights suit – titled Bond v. Utreras – in April 2004, but the incident went unreported in the mainstream media. Only Kalven reported on the story, writing a series called "Kicking the Pigeon" starting in July 2005. The series comprised 17 articles covering police misconduct allegations in public housing, published on his webzine The View from the Ground, and was completed by 2006. In June 2005, an attorney for the city issued a subpoena for Kalven's records from his reporting at Stateway, but he resisted the subpoena, citing the reporter's privilege. Kalven was represented by Thomas P. Sullivan, a former U.S. Attorney and partner at Jenner & Block. A magistrate judge rejected the subpoena as overly broad and placing an undue burden upon Kalven.

== Obtaining police misconduct records ==
Kalven v. City of Chicago
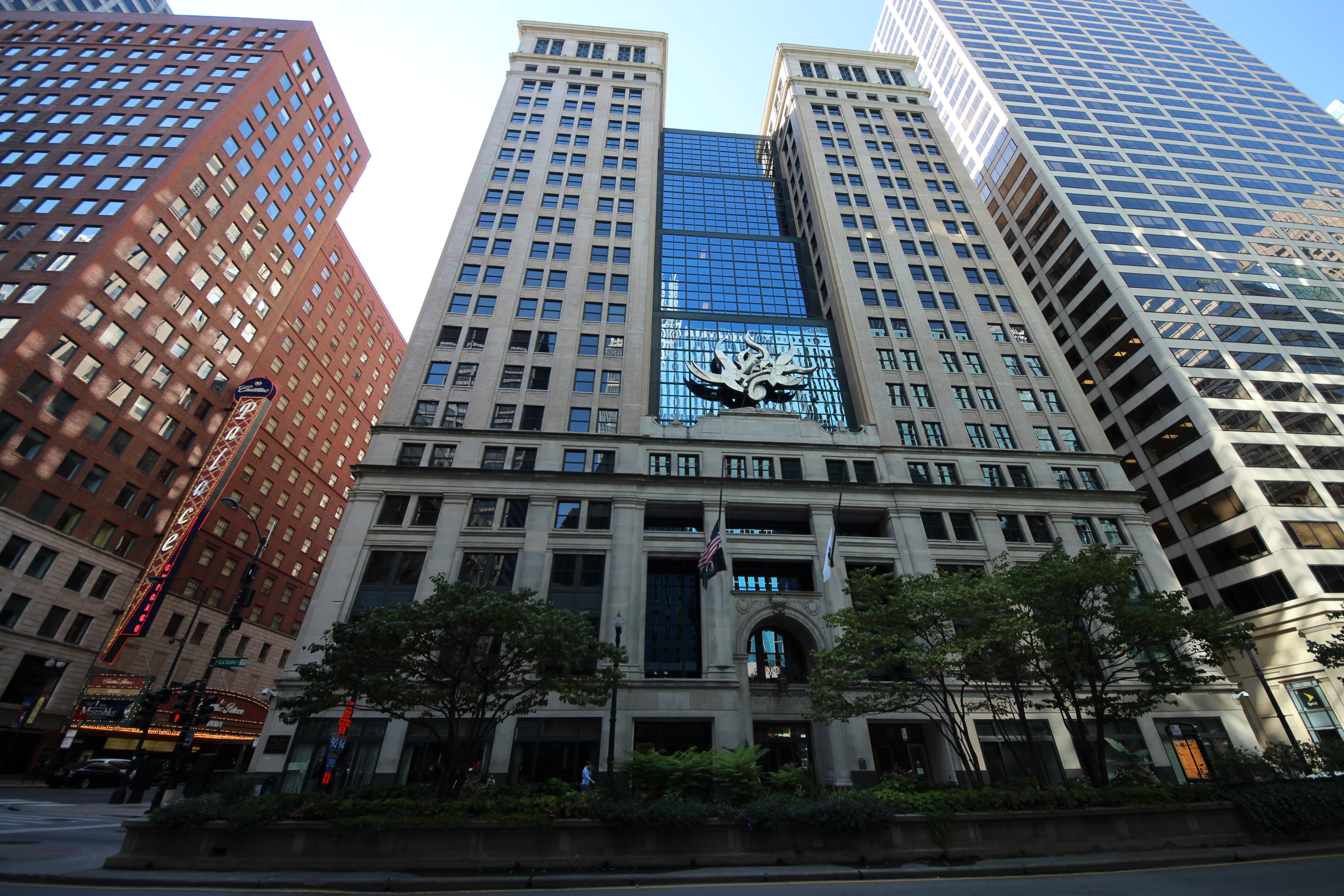
- Bilandic Building, home of the First District Appellate Court, in Chicago
- Court: Illinois Appellate Court, First District
- Full case name: Jamie Kalven v. The City of Chicago and the Chicago Police Department
- Decided: March 10, 2014
- Citations: 2014 IL App (1st) 121846; 7 N.E.3d 741 (2014)

Case history
- Appealed from: Circuit Court of Cook County, No. 09-CH-51396; Neil H. Cohen, Judge, presiding

Court membership
- Judges sitting: Maureen Connors, Joy Cunningham, Mathias W. Delort

Case opinions
- Records of completed investigations into alleged police misconduct, and lists of police officers with the most misconduct complaints, are subject to disclosure under the Illinois Freedom of Information Act.
- Decision by: Connors, joined by Cunningham
- Concurrence: Delort

Bond's attorney, Craig Futterman, asked the police department to hand over misconduct complaints and disciplinary records, as part of discovery to establish a pattern of abuse. The city produced a list of 662 officers who had received 10 or more complaints from 2001 through 2006. However, a protective order prevented Futterman from sharing those records with the public, including Kalven. In 2007, Bond's lawsuit was settled out of court for $150,000. Before the settlement was finalized, Kalven intervened in the case as a journalist, saying the documents should be made public.

U.S. District Judge Joan Lefkow agreed to lift the protective order, finding that the information had "a distinct public character", relating to the official duties of the police officers. The city appealed Lefkow's ruling to the U.S. Court of Appeals for the Seventh Circuit. At the appellate stage, Kalven was joined by 28 Chicago aldermen – a majority of the city council – who had been denied access to the same information by the city's law department under Mayor Richard M. Daley. A collective amicus curiae brief was filed by several news organizations – including the Associated Press, Chicago Tribune, Chicago Sun-Times, Chicago Reader, The New York Times, Copley Press, Gannett, Lee Enterprises, and the Illinois Press Association. The appeals court overturned Lefkow's ruling on procedural grounds, finding that Kalven lacked standing to intervene because the case had already been settled. However, the appeals court also stated in a footnote that Kalven was not prevented from seeking the records from the city directly through the Illinois Freedom of Information Act (FOIA).

Following the footnote in the Bond opinion, Kalven and Futterman initiated the FOIA process with the city. Kalven filed two requests. One asked for lists of officers with the most misconduct complaints (known as "repeater lists"), while the second asked for records of investigations into misconduct complaints (known as "complaint register files"). The city denied the requests, arguing that the complaint register files were exempt from disclosure under FOIA because they related to the police department's adjudication proceedings, and also because they contained preliminary recommendations on potential disciplinary actions.

The Illinois Appellate Court rejected the city's arguments in March 2014, in the case Kalven v. City of Chicago. The court held that the complaint register files were not "related to" adjudication proceedings, even though such complaints may eventually lead to disciplinary action. Any preliminary recommendations could be redacted, but the files could not be withheld in their entirety. As for the repeater lists, the court acknowledged the city's contentions that the police department did not ordinarily create such lists during the course of its business, but rather prepared them solely for discovery purposes in the Bond case. However, the repeater lists are still considered to be public records under FOIA, and they merely summarized the complaint register files, so the lists are subject to disclosure for the same reasons.

The city threatened to appeal to the Supreme Court of Illinois, but ultimately agreed to release the complaint records to the public. The case became a landmark decision, holding that police misconduct records are public information. Kalven's FOIA litigation, which Futterman and others worked on pro bono, accrued nearly $500,000 in attorney's fees. Of that amount, Kalven agreed to settle for a recovery of $200,000.

== Formalizing the Invisible Institute ==
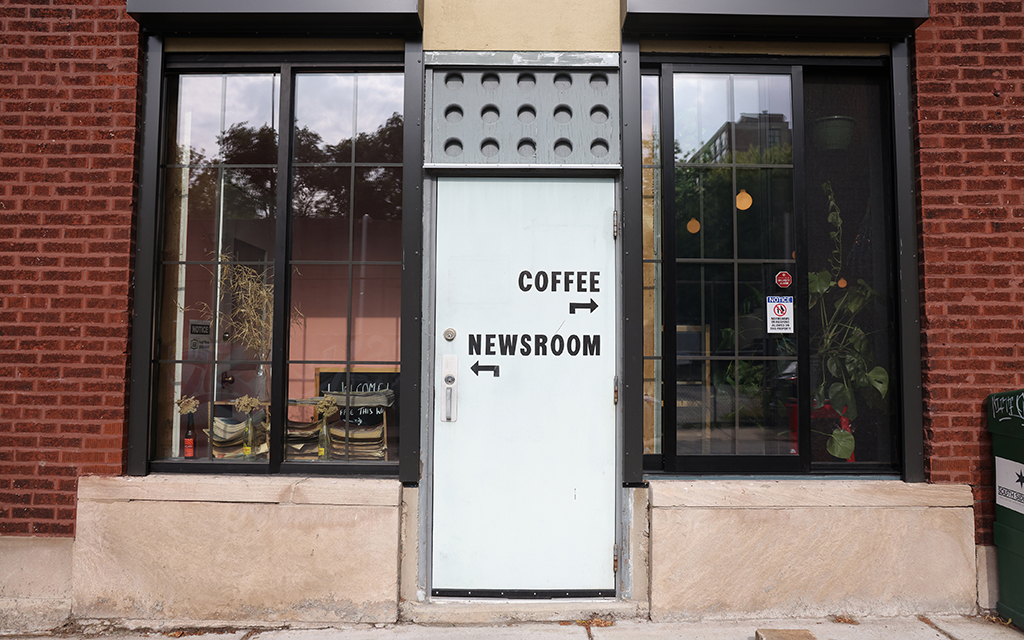
Invisible Institute office in 2022

After the 2014 court decision, the Invisible Institute incorporated as a nonprofit organization and recruited staff members to work on the release of the police information. By 2017, the Institute was based in Woodlawn. The court decision led to the creation in November 2015 of the Citizens Police Data Project and the Chicago Police Database, a public database of over 54,000 misconduct complaints against more than 8,000 officers from March 2011 through March 2015. The Institute and several other media outlets filed new FOIA requests for all misconduct records going back to 1967. Before the city could comply, the Fraternal Order of Police sued to block the release of those records, arguing that the union's collective bargaining agreement required misconduct records older than 5 years to be destroyed. The Appellate Court later ruled that the agreement's requirement to destroy records was unenforceable, as it would cause the city to violate FOIA.

Eventually, the Institute became a hub for Chicago police misconduct data, and by 2022 the data project included 247,161 allegations. The data project, ranging from 1988 to 2018, houses complaints and allegations made against officers, the number of sustained complaints, and individual officer profiles that list officer salaries and discipline they received for use-of-force incidents. In January 2016, the data project received $400,000 in grant funding from the Knight Foundation. In the fall of that year, Kalven published an exposé on the Watts crew, a group of police officers who allegedly harassed public housing residents in the South Side. The work was published on The Intercept, and the Institute petitioned the Circuit Court of Cook County to review possible wrongful convictions associated with those officers. The Institute also created a bureau focused on wrongful convictions and sharing accounts of police whistleblowers.

Starting in the early 2010s, the Institute worked on an initiative, called the "Youth/Police Project", to educate black teenagers on their constitutional rights, and to document their frequent experiences with police. Videos from the project have been used to show to policymakers and to train police officers.

== Reporting on murder of Laquan McDonald ==
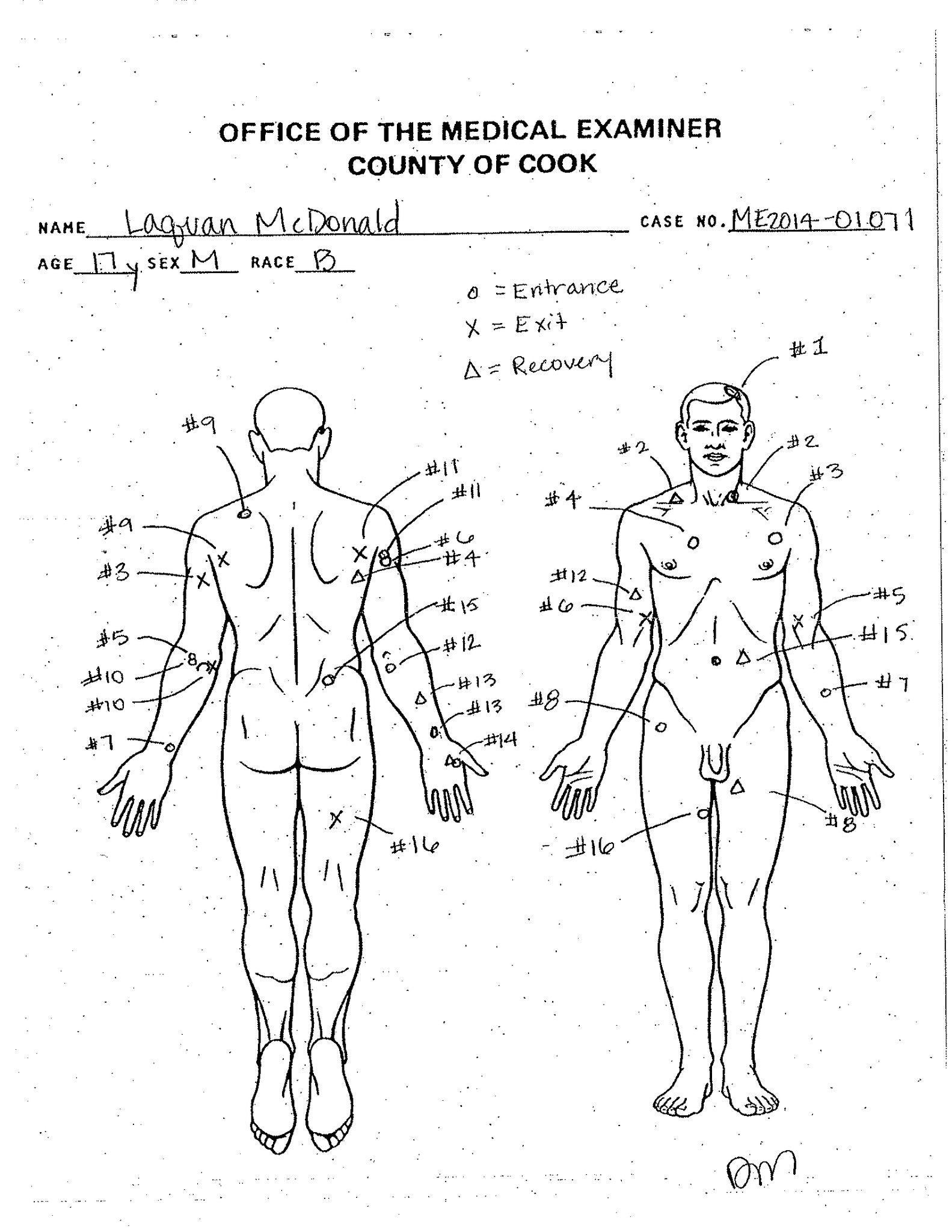
Autopsy diagram from the murder of Laquan McDonald

Kalven reported on the murder of Laquan McDonald, a black teenager, by white Chicago police officer Jason Van Dyke in October 2014. The official story from the police department initially suggested that McDonald had rushed at officers with a knife, and died from a single gunshot by Van Dyke. However, in early November, a confidential whistleblower from the police department informed Kalven and Futterman of the existence of a dashcam video that contradicted the official account. The source also revealed that McDonald had not rushed at the officers but rather was moving away from them, and Van Dyke had shot McDonald 16 times, execution-style. In December, they publicly called for the dashcam video's release. After the city refused multiple times, Futterman sued for the video's release.

In February 2015, Kalven obtained a copy of McDonald's autopsy report, which contradicted the official account of a single gunshot and instead confirmed that Van Dyke had shot McDonald 16 times, execution-style. In the same month, attorneys for McDonald's family had received a copy of the video by filing a subpoena, and demanded $16 million in compensation from the city. By March, McDonald's family and the city approved a $5 million settlement agreement, which also required that the video be kept confidential until the investigation was completed. The video was not released to the public until November 26, 2015, thirteen months after McDonald's murder.

Kalven's and Futterman's work led to political fallout, including protests and demands for the resignation or recall of Mayor Rahm Emanuel and other officials. Emanuel fired Chicago Police Superintendent Garry McCarthy along with the head of the department's oversight agency, and the U.S. Department of Justice opened investigations into the police department. Kalven's reporting on the autopsy report also won him the George Polk Award for Local Reporting in 2015 and the Ridenhour Courage Prize in March 2016.

In 2017, Kalven was subpoenaed to testify about his sources at a hearing for the murder case against Van Dyke. Cook County Judge Vincent Gaughan quashed the subpoena, finding that Van Dyke's attorneys were engaged in a "fishing expedition" and did not demonstrate that Kalven's testimony would be relevant to their case. Gaughan's decision relied less on the reporter's privilege, but recognized that journalists could not be forced to reveal their sources absent "extraordinary circumstances". In 2018, Kalven was again subpoenaed to testify at a trial of three other police officers involved in the incident, but that subpoena was withdrawn.

== Later career ==
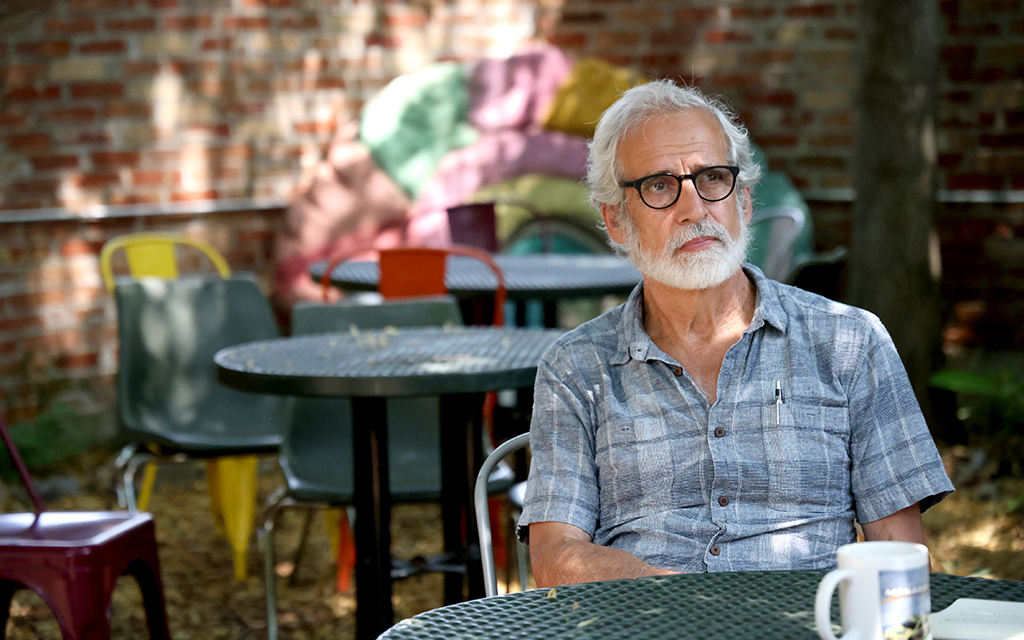
Kalven in 2022

Kalven was a visiting practitioner-in-residence at the Kenan Institute for Ethics at Duke University in 2017. He co-produced 16 Shots, an Emmy-winning documentary on the McDonald case. He also worked as a consultant on the TV series 61st Street. In 2021, the Institute won a Pulitzer Prize for National Reporting for its investigation into abusive biting by police dogs, and its podcast Somebody was also a finalist for the Pulitzer Prize for Audio Reporting.

Kalven stepped down as director of the Institute in 2021. In April 2022, Kalven was recognized for his human rights reporting when he was awarded the I. F. Stone Medal for Journalistic Independence.

== Works ==
- Kalven, Harry (1989). Kalven, Jamie (ed.). A Worthy Tradition: Freedom of Speech in America. New York: Harper & Row. ISBN 9780060916220.
- Kalven, Jamie (1998). "'Do You Know Where You Are?': A Memoir of Becoming a South Sider". In Ayers, William; Hunt, Jean Ann; Quinn, Therese (eds.). Teaching for Social Justice: A Democracy and Education Reader. New York: New Press, Teachers College Press. ISBN 9781565844209.
- —— (1999). Working with Available Light: A Family's World After Violence. New York: W. W. Norton. ISBN 9780393046908.
- ——; Evans, Patricia; Eads, David (2001–2007). The View from the Ground. Stateway Gardens, Chicago: Invisible Institute (fictitious publisher). Archived from the original on June 20, 2023.
  - —— (July 6, 2005 – February 16, 2006). "Kicking the Pigeon". The View from the Ground – Reporting on the incidents that led to the Bond v. Utreras litigation.
- Futterman, Craig B.; Hunt, Chaclyn; —— (2016). "They Have All the Power": Youth/Police Encounters on Chicago's South Side. Chicago: University of Chicago Law School. OCLC 947589612.
- 16 Shots (2019), co-producer
- Somebody (2020), executive producer – with the Invisible Institute

== See also ==
- Institute for Nonprofit News (Invisible Institute is a member)
