= Jeremy Scahill =

American investigative journalist

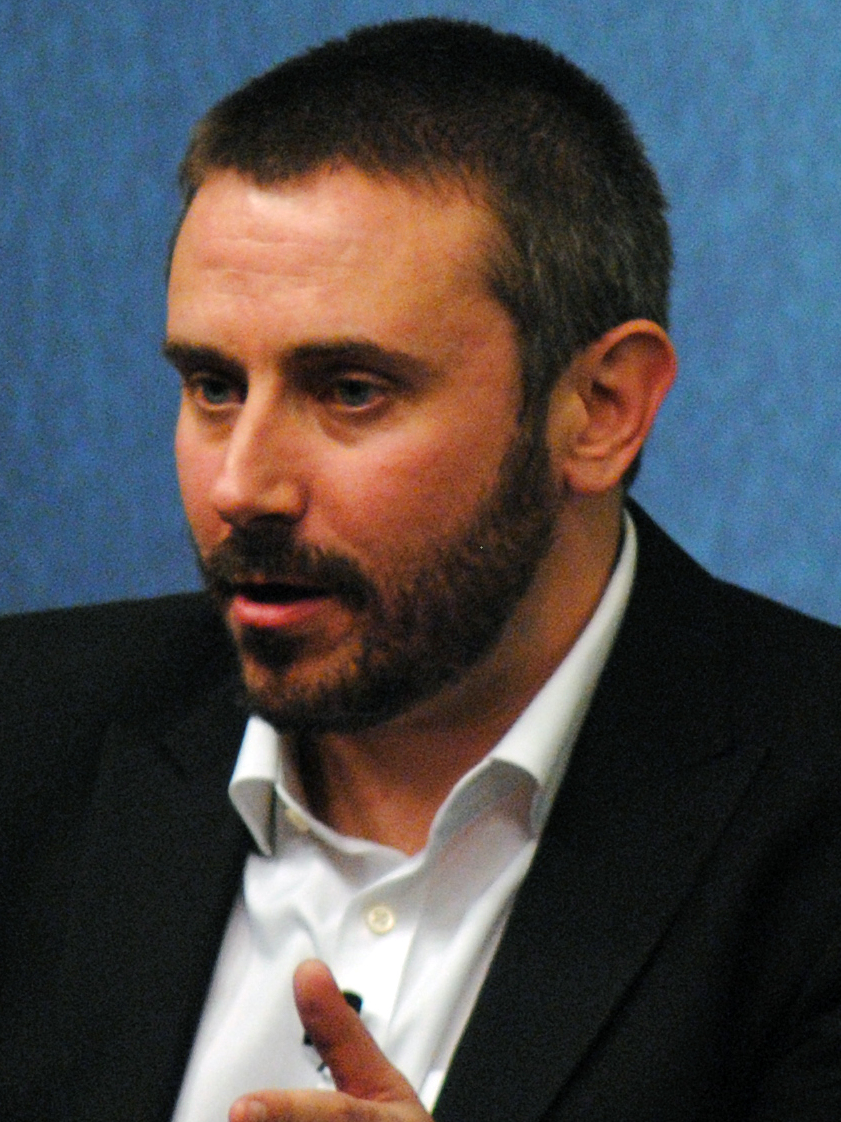
- Scahill in 2013
- Born: Jeremy M. Scahill; 1974 (age 51–52); Chicago, Illinois, U.S.
- Education: Wauwatosa East High School; University of Wisconsin (dropped out)
- Occupation: Investigative journalist
- Employer: Drop Site News
- Notable work: Blackwater

Jeremy Scahill (born 1974) is an American activist, author, and investigative journalist. He is a founding editor of the online news publication The Intercept and author of Blackwater: The Rise of the World's Most Powerful Mercenary Army (2007), which won the George Polk Book Award. His book Dirty Wars: The World Is a Battlefield (2013) was adapted into a documentary film which premiered at the Sundance Film Festival and was nominated for the 2014 Academy Award for Best Documentary Feature. In July 2024, he left The Intercept and, together with Ryan Grim and Nausicaa Renner, founded Drop Site News.

Scahill is a Fellow at the Type Media Center. Scahill learned journalism and started his career on the independently syndicated daily news show Democracy Now!. He publishes a podcast titled Intercepted.

== Early life ==
Scahill was born in Chicago, Illinois, and was raised in Wauwatosa, Wisconsin, a suburb of Milwaukee, by "social activist" parents, Lisa and Michael Scahill, both nurses. He graduated from Wauwatosa East High School in 1992. His father grew up on the South Side of Chicago, son of Irish immigrants in a Catholic family. He had planned to be a seminarian. Scahill attended a few University of Wisconsin regional campuses and a local technical college before deciding his "time would be better spent by entering the struggle for justice in this country." After dropping out of college, Scahill spent several years on the East Coast working in homeless shelters. He started his career as an unpaid intern at the nonprofit news program Democracy Now! of the Pacifica Radio network. While he was at Democracy Now!, Scahill learned the technical side of radio, and learned "journalism as a trade, rather than an academic study".

Discussing the roots of his activism, Scahill in the Socialist Worker cited influences from Catholic priest Daniel Berrigan, and Dorothy Day who founded the Catholic Worker movement, and characterized the US government as a criminal syndicate that metes out punishment to the rest of the world.

He also worked in 2000 as a producer for Michael Moore's TV series The Awful Truth on Bravo.

== Journalism career ==
Scahill became a senior producer and correspondent for Democracy Now! and remains a frequent contributor. Scahill and his Democracy Now! colleague Amy Goodman were co-recipients of the 1998 George Polk Award for their radio documentary Drilling and Killing: Chevron and Nigeria's Oil Dictatorship, which investigated the Chevron Corporation's role in the killing of two Nigerian environmental activists.

In 1998, Scahill traveled to Iraq for Democracy Now! and Pacifica Radio, where he reported on the impact of the economic sanctions on Iraq and the "No-Fly Zone" bombings in Northern and Southern Iraq. An article in AlterNet has described Jeremy Scahill as a "progressive journalist".

In October 2013 Scahill joined with reporters Glenn Greenwald and Laura Poitras to establish an on-line investigative journalism publishing venture funded by eBay billionaire Pierre Omidyar. The idea for the new media outlet came from Omidyar's "concern about press freedoms in the US and around the world." The Intercept, a publication of First Look Media, went live on February 10, 2014. The short-term goal of the digital magazine is to publish reports about information contained in documents disclosed by Edward Snowden concerning the NSA. According to editors Greenwald, Poitras, and Scahill, their "longer-term mission is to provide aggressive and independent adversarial journalism across a wide range of issues, from secrecy, criminal and civil justice abuses and civil liberties violations to media conduct, societal inequality and all forms of financial and political corruption."

On November 30, 2013, Scahill refused to participate in a Stop the War Conference in London unless pro-Assad Syrian nun Mother Agnes was dropped from the symposium. Mother Agnes eventually pulled out. In February 2017, Scahill canceled his appearance on Real Time with Bill Maher after finding out that far-right political commentator Milo Yiannopoulos was scheduled to appear on the same day.

Scahill criticized the US government's decision to charge WikiLeaks founder Julian Assange under the Espionage Act of 1917 for his role in the 2010 publication of a trove of Iraq War documents and diplomatic cables. Scahill tweeted: "This is about retaliation for publishing evidence of U.S. war crimes and other crimes by the most powerful nation on Earth. It's a threat to press freedom."

On May 9, 2019, the intelligence analyst Daniel Everette Hale was arrested for leaking classified information to a reporter. The reporter to whom Hale leaked was not explicitly named in the indictment, but the government released a list of exhibits it planned to use at trial that included a picture of Hale meeting publicly with Scahill at an event to promote Scahill's book, texts Hale sent to his friend describing meeting Scahill, and emails between Scahill and Hale months before they moved their communication to Jabber (software that allows encrypted communication).

In July 2024, Scahill left The Intercept, along with Ryan Grim, to co-found Drop Site News.

== Works ==
=== Kosovo conflict ===
In 1999, he covered the Kosovo conflict, reporting live from Belgrade and Kosovo itself. In an article in the International Socialist Review, Scahill accused the United Nations Mission in Kosovo (UNMIK) of being complicit in Albanian atrocities against Serbs.

In 1999, Scahill and Goodman's documentary Drilling and Killing: Chevron and Nigeria's Oil Dictatorship was also awarded one of the prizes of the Overseas Press Club. The keynote speaker was a major supporter of the Kosovo War, Richard Holbrooke, who, to the applause of 300 attendees, announced that the building of the Radio Television of Serbia had been bombed by NATO. The bombing left 16 media workers dead. The only protesting voices at the ceremony were Scahill and Goodman who wanted to ask Holbrooke questions, but he refused. They then rejected the prize. In 2019 Scahill apologized to the victims' family members in the name of the US government, calling the bombing a war crime.

After Slobodan Milosevic's death in 2006, Scahill accused the International Criminal Tribunal for the former Yugoslavia (ICTY) of practicing "victors' justice" and being "a poor substitute for a true international court."

=== War on terror ===
Between 2001 and 2003, Scahill reported frequently from Baghdad for Democracy Now! and other media outlets. As the Iraq invasion began, Scahill appeared frequently on Democracy Now!, often co-hosting with Amy Goodman.

Scahill has reported from Afghanistan, Iraq, Somalia, Yemen, the former Yugoslavia, post-Katrina Louisiana, and elsewhere across the globe. Scahill is a frequent guest on many programs, appearing regularly on The Rachel Maddow Show, Real Time with Bill Maher, and Democracy Now! He has also appeared on ABC World News, CBS Evening News, NBC Nightly News, The Daily Show, CNN, The NewsHour, MSNBC, Bill Moyers Journal, and NPR. In addition, Scahill has written for The Times, The Sunday Telegraph, the BBC, The Indypendent, the Los Angeles Times, Z Magazine, Socialist Worker, International Socialist Review, The Progressive, In These Times, and The Guardian.

He has been a vocal critic of private military contractors, particularly Blackwater Worldwide, which is the subject of his book, Blackwater: The Rise of the World's Most Powerful Mercenary Army. The book received numerous accolades, including the Alternet Best Book of the Year Award, a spot on both the Barnes & Noble and Amazon lists of the Best Nonfiction Books of 2007, and notable mention in The New York Times.

Scahill's work has sparked several Congressional investigations. In 2010, Scahill testified before the U.S. House Judiciary Committee on the United States' shadow wars in Pakistan, Yemen, and elsewhere:

As the war rages on in Afghanistan and—despite spin to the contrary—in Iraq as well, US Special Operations Forces and the Central Intelligence Agency are engaged in parallel, covert, shadow wars that are waged in near total darkness and largely away from effective or meaningful Congressional oversight or journalistic scrutiny. The actions and consequences of these wars is seldom discussed in public or investigated by the Congress. The current US strategy can be summed up as follows: We are trying to kill our way to peace. And the killing fields are growing in number.

In July 2011, Scahill revealed the existence of a CIA-run counterterrorism center at the airport in Mogadishu, Somalia, and reported on a previously unknown secret prison located in the basement of the U.S.-funded Somali National Security Agency, in which—according to a U.S. official—U.S. agents interrogated prisoners.

When the public became aware of President Obama's "Kill List", Scahill was frequently cited as an expert on the topic of extrajudicial killings. In 2019, he argued that Donald Trump probably represented "the best hope that we've had since 9/11 to end some of these forever wars."

=== Blackwater ===
Scahill's first book, The New York Times bestseller Blackwater: The Rise of the World's Most Powerful Mercenary Army, thoroughly revised and updated to include the Nisour Square massacre, was released in paperback edition in 2008. Blackwater depicts the rise of the controversial military contracting firm Blackwater, now called Academi.

Scahill exposed the presence of Blackwater contractors in New Orleans after Hurricane Katrina and his reporting sparked a Congressional inquiry and an internal Department of Homeland Security investigation.

=== Dirty Wars ===
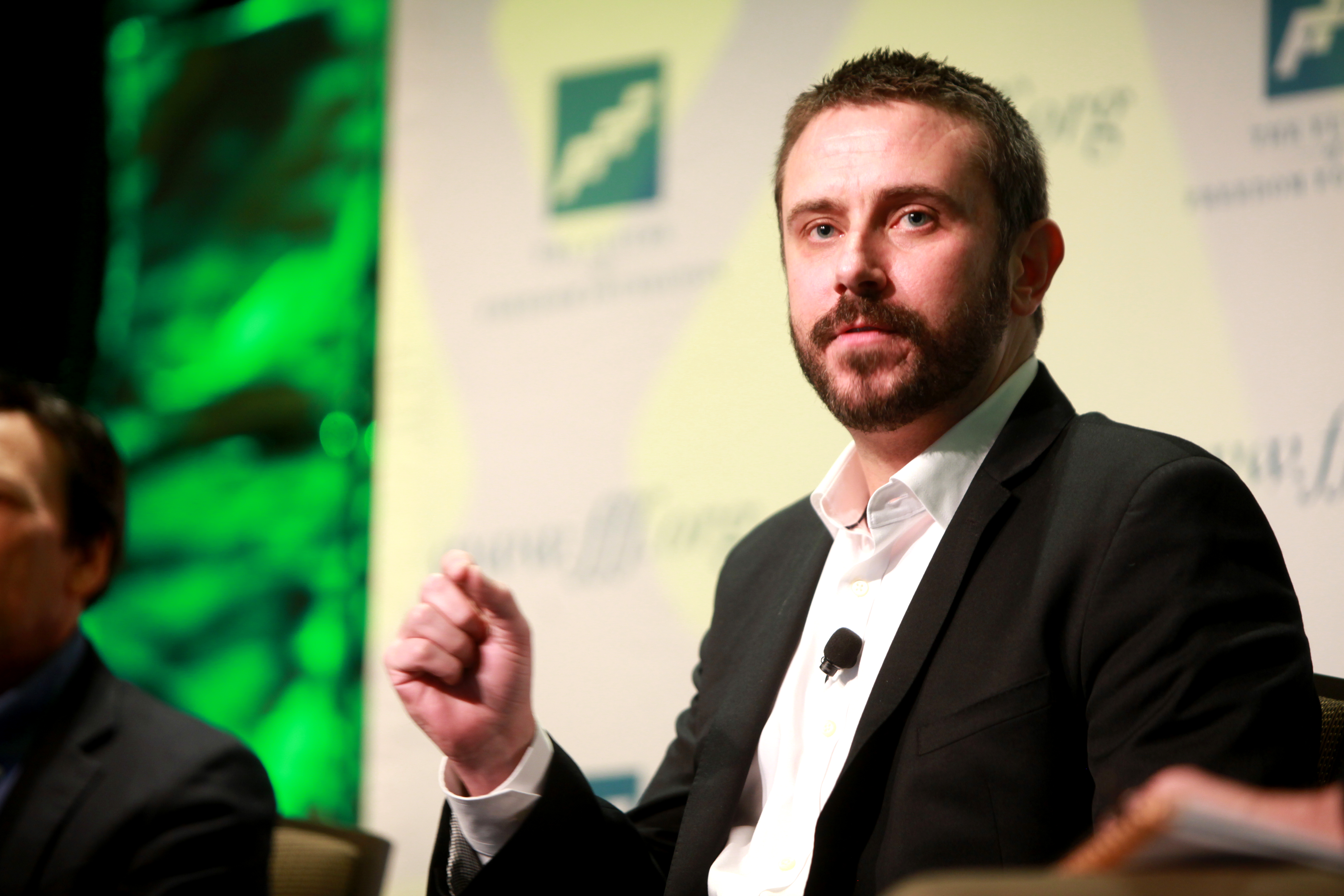
Scahill in 2014

Scahill's book Dirty Wars: The World Is a Battlefield was published by Nation Books on April 23, 2013. The main premise of the book is that Obama continued Bush's doctrine that "the world is a battlefield," increasing reliance on missiles and drone strikes while elevating the role of the U.S. Military's Joint Special Operations Command such that it carried out the bulk of covert operations and targeted killings of suspected terrorists. Scahill expands on this theme by covering topics such as the killing of U.S. citizens accused of involvement in terrorist groups, namely Anwar Awlaki and his 16-year-old son Abdulrahman Anwar al-Awlaki. Scahill also discusses the perceived lack of accountability of U.S. special forces in controversial actions, such as the Khataba raid, where U.S. special forces killed two males, including the pro-U.S. local police commander, as well as three females, two of whom were pregnant. An Afghan investigation of the incident, including interviews with claimed witnesses, alleged evidence tampering by US forces, such as bullets being removed from the wall where the women were shot in an attempt to conceal involvement of US forces.

The book was released around the same time as a 2013 American documentary directed by Richard Rowley based on a screenplay written by Scahill and David Riker. Scahill both produced and narrated the film. Dirty Wars premiered at the 2013 Sundance Film Festival on January 18, 2013 and was released in four theaters on June 7, 2013. The film was nominated for the 2014 Academy Award for Best Documentary Feature, ultimately losing to 20 Feet from Stardom.

=== Abdulelah Haider Shaye ===
Scahill has been an advocate for Yemeni journalist Abdulelah Haider Shaye, imprisoned in Yemen by Yemeni authorities on controversial charges. Scahill's March 13, 2012 article in The Nation states how President Obama urged Yemeni officials to keep Shaye in jail because of his reporting on the 2009 Al Ma'jalah bombings. Shaye described remnants of U.S. Tomahawk missiles, although the United States initially denied involvement. Subsequent English-language reports on the issue have relied on Scahill's journalism.

=== Israel's invasion of Gaza ===
Scahill has been a fierce critic of Israel's military response in Gaza since the October 7 attacks. Writing for The Intercept, Scahill argues that the October 7 attacks were a result of a 75-year campaign by Israel, of ethnic cleansing and apartheid in Gaza. According to him, the primary agenda of Benjamin Netanyahu has long been "the absolute destruction of Palestine and its people".

== Awards and recognition ==
Scahill has won numerous awards, including the George Polk Award (twice), numerous Project Censored Awards, and the Izzy Award, named after investigative journalist I. F. Stone. He was among the few Western reporters to gain access to the Abu Ghraib prison when Saddam Hussein was in power and his story on the emptying of that prison won a 2003 Golden Reel Award from The National Federation of Community Broadcasters. In 2013, he was awarded the Windham–Campbell Literature Prize, one of the richest literary awards in the world.

== Bibliography ==
- Scahill, Jeremy (2007). Blackwater: The Rise of the World's Most Powerful Mercenary Army. PublicAffairs. ISBN 9781560259794.
- Scahill, Jeremy (2012). Dirty Wars: The World Is a Battlefield. PublicAffairs. ISBN 9781568586717.
- Scahill, Jeremy (2016). The Assassination Complex: Inside the Government's Secret Drone Warfare Program. Simon & Schuster. ISBN 9781501144134.
