= Vice News =

American media news outlet

- Country: Canada / United States
- Headquarters: New York City, U.S.

Programming
- Language: English
- Picture format: 1080p HD (depends on connection)

Ownership
- Owner: Vice Media
- Sister channels: Television; Vice on TV; Vice on Showtime; Online; Vice Films; Vice Magazine

History
- Launched: December 2013; 12 years ago

Links
- Website: vicenews.com

Availability

Streaming media
- YouTube: Vice News
- Vice and Vice News apps: Android and iOS

Vice News (stylized as VICE News) is Vice Media's alternative current affairs channel, producing daily documentary essays and video through its website and YouTube channel. It promoted itself on its coverage of "under-reported stories". Vice News was created in December 2013 and was based in New York City, though it had bureaus worldwide.

The channel originally launched to mixed reception in 2013. In the following decade, Vice News won a number of awards for its reporting, including four Peabody Awards and the inaugural Pulitzer Prize for Audio Reporting.

In May 2023, Vice Media filed for bankruptcy and Vice News fired most of its employees. The YouTube channel of Vice News was taken over by Vice co-founder Shane Smith and began uploading podcasts held by Smith. Previously, Vice had been described as progressive and left-leaning.

== History ==
Before Vice News was founded, Vice published news documentaries and news reports from around the world through its YouTube channel alongside other programs. Vice had reported on events such as crime in Venezuela, the Israeli–Palestinian conflict, protests in Turkey, the North Korean and Iranian regimes, and the Syrian Civil War through their own YouTube channel and website. After the creation of Vice News as a separate division, its reporting increased with worldwide coverage starting immediately with videos published on YouTube and articles on its website daily.

In December 2013, Vice Media expanded its international news division into an independent division dedicated exclusively to news and created Vice News. Vice Media put $50 million into its news division, setting up 34 bureaus worldwide and drawing praise for its in-depth coverage of international news. Vice News has primarily targeted a younger audience composed predominantly of millennials, the same audience to which its parent company appeals.

In November 2014, Vice News launched its French-language version.

In October 2015, Vice hired Josh Tyrangiel to run a daily Vice News show for HBO. Tyrangiel had recently left Bloomberg Businessweek, where he was reported to be "a divisive figure who was both admired and despised during his six years there." Tyrangiel named Ryan McCarthy, formerly an assistant editor of The New York Times, as editor-in-chief of Vice News.

In May 2016, it was announced that Tyrangiel had been promoted to oversee all of Vice News. As the announcement was made, Tyrangiel promptly laid off some 20 editorial and production staff members. In an interview given the previous week, Vice Media founder Shane Smith called Tyrangiel "a murderer," foretelling a "bloodbath" in digital media. That June, Tyrangiel touted various new hires he had brought aboard as part of his team.

In December 2016, it was announced that Vice News had entered into a partnership with The Guardian newspaper that would include Guardian journalists working at Vice's offices in East London and contributing to the two HBO television programs currently on the air. It will also include allowing The Guardian access to Vice's video production skills with content distributed to its millennial-skewed global audience.

On May 15, 2023, Vice Media formally filed for Chapter 11 bankruptcy, as part of a possible sale to a consortium of lenders including Fortress Investment Group, which will, alongside Soros Fund Management and Monroe Capital, invest $225 million as a credit bid for nearly all of its assets. In February 2024, Vice Media announced it would shutter the vice.com website and cut hundreds of jobs, leading to a mass layoff. The YouTube channel of Vice News was taken over by Vice co-founder Shane Smith and began uploading podcasts held by Smith, featuring right-leaning guests.

== Reporters ==
Vice News had more than 100 members of its reporting and editorial staff in 35 bureaus around the world including New York City, Toronto, London, Berlin, Mexico City, São Paulo, Los Angeles, Istanbul, Moscow, Beijing, and Kabul. On April 21, 2014, while covering the Russo-Ukrainian War, Vice News reporter Simon Ostrovsky was kidnapped by pro-Russian separatist forces and held for three days before being released in Sloviansk.

== Programming and content ==
Since its creation, Vice News has covered emerging events and widespread issues around the world. Every day it publishes a daily news capsule called "News Beyond the Headlines" where it briefly covers four daily stories which did not receive much coverage by other mainstream news outlets but it still considers important. It also publishes daily articles on its website on a variety of world current events, along with maintaining a Vice News Wire where it displays wire reports from around the world.

It has several past and ongoing documentary series including: Russian military intervention in Ukraine; civil war in Iraq; the Israeli–Palestinian conflict; North Korean laborers in Russia; the Western Sahara conflict; the struggles of Afghan interpreters working for the US military in acquiring visas; the prison crisis in the US at Salinas Valley State Prison; protests against the FIFA World Cup in Brazil; Venezuelan anti-government protests; expansion of the Islamic State; protests in Ferguson, Missouri; the Syrian Civil War; the militarization of America's police forces and Central American refugees fleeing street gangs borne in American prisons to cross the American border; global warming and the evidence of the melting of Antarctica's glaciers, and the build-up of military forces of Russia with Scandinavians assisted by the American military.

=== Television series ===
- Vice on City: A weekly television series on City, a Canadian television network, of documentaries that highlight Vice News reporting.
- Vice: A newsmagazine television series on Showtime
- Vice News Tonight: A daily evening news broadcast on Vice TV

== Reception ==
As of October 2023, the Vice News YouTube page had 8.7 million subscribers and over 3 billion views in total. In August 2014, Vice News was described by The Guardian as one of the fastest growing channels on YouTube.

Lara Pendergast, deputy online editor at the UK magazine The Spectator, suggests that Vice News gets its strength and popularity by getting younger audiences to become more and more interested about international news in a way that traditional media has not. "Its videos may fail every rule in the BBC impartiality book, but they are brilliantly edited and, often, utterly compelling. Vice News has found young, fearless foreign correspondents to serve a youthful audience who are bored stiff by traditional outlets but are quite prepared to watch videos on their mobile phones."

"Vice's brand image marketing as an edgy, hip outlet have helped drive its popularity with young people", says media critic Charles Johnson. "Mainstream media is not trusted by a lot of people, and rightly so, so they [Vice] step in and fill in", he says. "People see a sense of fun behind it. Jon Stewart is very popular, but he's an entertainer. Vice is something similar."

Rick Edmonds, media and business analyst at the Poynter Institute, critiques Vice News' reporting as "raw and tasteless sometimes" and more akin to personal essays than balanced journalism. Other critiques mention that its work is more affiliated with entertainment than hard-hitting news.

In a 2013 opinion piece for U.S. News & World Report, editor of the New York-based Foreign Policy Association Robert Nolan, stated that Vice's North Korea reporting was "more Jackass TV series than journalism".

== Awards ==
Vice News has won four Peabody Awards for its documentary programs, The Islamic State and Last Chance High in 2015, Charlottesville: Race and Terror in 2017, and Losing Ground in 2020. In 2020, Emily Green of Vice News jointly won the first Pulitzer Prize for Audio Reporting with This American Life and Molly O'Toole of the Los Angeles Times for their collaboration on "The Out Crowd", an investigative podcast episode on the effects of the Remain in Mexico policy.

In 2021, Vice News won the Rory Peck Award for "Uyghurs Who Fled China Now Face Repression in Pakistan", the Lorenzo Natali Media Prize for "Rohingya Brides Thought They Were Fleeing Violence. Then They Met Their Grooms.", the Online Journalism Award for "The Story of...", and two Edward R. Murrow Awards for "Say Her Name: Investigating the Death of Breonna Taylor" and "Life Under Bombs: On the Frontlines of Fighting in Azerbaijan". In 2022, Vice News won the Alfred I. duPont–Columbia University Award for "The Shockwave".

From 2018 to 2021, Vice News received more News & Documentary Emmy Award nominations each year than any other organization. In 2021, Vice News received 23 nominations for News & Documentary Emmy Awards, winning four.
