= Raid on Khataba =

US attack on Afghan residence in the War in Afghanistan

- Part of the War in Afghanistan
- Type: Raid
- Location: Khataba village, Paktia Province, Afghanistan; 33°36′00″N 69°13′01″E
- Date: 12 February 2010; 4:00 a.m. (UTC+04:30)
- Executed by: 75th Ranger Regiment
- Casualties: 5 killed
- Location of Khataba within Afghanistan

The Raid on Khataba, also referred to as the raid on Gardez, was an incident in the War in Afghanistan in which five civilians, including two pregnant women and a teenage girl, were killed by U.S. forces on February 12, 2010. All were shot when U.S. Army Rangers raided a house in Khataba village, outside the city of Gardez, where dozens of people had gathered earlier to celebrate the naming of a newborn baby. Initially, U.S. Military officials implied the three women were killed before the raid by family members, reporting that the women had been found "tied up, gagged and killed." But investigators sent by the Afghan government reported, based on interviews and pictures of the scene, that the special operation forces removed bullets from the victims' bodies and cleaned their wounds as part of an attempted coverup. NATO denied this allegation, and Afghan investigator Merza Mohammed Yarmand stated, "We can not confirm it as we had not been able to autopsy the bodies." The US military later admitted that the special operations unit killed the three women during the raid.

== Response ==
NATO and the UN claimed to "not know of such an incident", but press leakage led to a full investigation of the killings, but the bodies of the deceased were buried according to religious tradition before NATO could conduct autopsies to confirm the allegations. Insisting that the deaths were a "terrible mistake", Vice Admiral William McRaven, head of the JSOC, the command over the unit which conducted the raid, visited Khataba two months after the raid. He apologized, accepted responsibility for the deaths, and made a traditional Afghan condolence offering of sheep. The soldiers that had conducted the raid faced no disciplinary measures since they had followed the "rules of engagement".

== In media ==
- Dirty Wars, a 2013 American documentary by Jeremy Scahill.

== See also ==
- United States war crimes
- War crimes in Afghanistan
