= The Fourth World War =

- Directed by: Richard Rowley
- Produced by: Richard Rowley; Jacqueline Soohen
- Narrated by: Michael Franti; Suheir Hammad
- Production company: Big Noise Films
- Release date: 2003
- Running time: 78 minutes
- Language: English

The Fourth World War is a 2003 documentary film directed by Richard Rowley and Jacqueline Soohen. Its subject is various current or recent resistance movements in different parts of the world.
