= Dominic Gates =

Irish-American aerospace reporter

- Born: 1954 or 1955 (age 71–72); Dungannon, Northern Ireland
- Education: Queen's University, Belfast
- Occupation: Journalist
- Years active: 1992–2025
- Employer: The Seattle Times
- Known for: 2020 Pulitzer Prize in National Reporting co-recipient
- Spouse: Nina Shapiro
- Children: 2

Dominic Gates is an Irish-American aerospace journalist, math teacher, and Pulitzer Prize winner. He spent most his career with The Seattle Times on assignment to cover Boeing from 2003 to 2025. Gates was a co-recipient of the 2020 Pulitzer Prize in National Reporting alongside Steve Miletich, Mike Baker, and Lewis Kamb for their coverage of the Boeing 737 MAX crashes and investigations. Gates retired from The Times in 2025.

== Early life ==
Gates was born in Dungannon, Northern Ireland, as one of six children. He was educated at St Patrick's Academy in Dungannon and graduated with a mathematics degree from Queen's University, Belfast. Gates taught high school mathematics in Northern Ireland and Zimbabwe before relocating to the United States.

== Journalism career ==
While having no formal training in journalism, Gates contributed several articles to the magazine Fortnight on an unpaid basis. After moving to Seattle with his wife in 1992, he took on several freelancing assignments for various magazines and news organizations while continuing to teach mathematics. Gates was hired by technology magazine The Industry Standard in 2000, but the magazine went out of business 18 months later.

Gates then joined The Seattle Times in 2003 as an aerospace reporter, covering the local Boeing beat. He covered the development and launch of the Boeing 787 Dreamliner project and later the Boeing 737 MAX program, including two fatal crashes and the subsequent grounding of the aircraft. He won critical acclaim for his investigation into the 737 MAX and its automated flight control system, which had been written prior to the second crash. Gates and Times colleagues Steve Miletich, Mike Baker, and Lewis Kamb were awarded the 2019 George Polk Award in Business Reporting, the 2020 Pulitzer Prize in National Reporting, and the 2020 Gerald Loeb Award for Beat Reporting for their coverage of the Boeing 737 MAX program.

On March 14, 2025, Gates retired from The Seattle Times after 22 years as the newspaper's aerospace reporter.

== Personal life ==
Gates is married to Nina Shapiro, a fellow journalist at The Seattle Times whom he met while teaching in Zimbabwe. They have two adult daughters.

== Selected bibliography ==
- "Boeing's 737 MAX Crisis", The Seattle Times – award-winning series

1. "Flawed analysis, failed oversight: How Boeing, FAA certified the suspect 737 MAX flight control system", March 21, 2019
2. "Engineers say Boeing pushed to limit safety testing in race to certify planes, including 737 MAX", May 5, 2019
3. "The inside story of MCAS: How Boeing's 737 MAX system gained power and lost safeguards", June 24, 2019
4. "Boeing rejected 737 MAX safety upgrades before fatal crashes, whistleblower says", October 3, 2019
5. "Boeing pushed FAA to relax 737 MAX certification requirements for crew alerts", October 3, 2019
