= Dirty Wars =

- Theatrical release poster
- Directed by: Richard Rowley
- Written by: Jeremy Scahill; David Riker
- Based on: Dirty Wars: The World Is a Battlefield by Jeremy Scahill
- Produced by: Anthony Arnove; Brenda Coughlin; Jeremy Scahill
- Narrated by: Jeremy Scahill
- Cinematography: Richard Rowley
- Edited by: Richard Rowley
- Music by: David Harrington
- Distributed by: Sundance Selects
- Release date: January 18, 2013 (Sundance)
- Running time: 86 minutes
- Country: United States
- Language: English
- Box office: $371,245

Dirty Wars is a 2013 American documentary film, which accompanies the book Dirty Wars: The World Is a Battlefield by Jeremy Scahill. The film is directed by Richard Rowley, and written by Scahill and David Riker.

== Production ==
Production for the film began in 2010 when Scahill, who worked as a reporter for The Nation magazine, traveled to Afghanistan with director Richard Rowley, with only a vague idea for what the film would be about; they only decided upon the subject matter after investigating a series of night raids carried out by the Joint Special Operations Command (JSOC). The film had no budget, and at the outset Scahill and Rowley traveled to Afghanistan using money from a grant Scahill had received to support his reporting.

Initially the film was not intended to have Scahill as a narrator or protagonist, instead acting as a "tour guide" as the film traveled between the sites of covert U.S. military action. David Riker was brought on board to assist with writing after an initial four-hour rough cut of the film was put together, and he convinced Scahill and Rowley to make the film more personal.

During filming, Scahill and Rowley traveled to Somalia to meet warlords in different territories of the country. As no American insurance companies would cover them to travel there, they had to get kidnap and ransom insurance from another country.

== Synopsis ==
Investigative journalist Jeremy Scahill travels to Afghanistan, Yemen, Somalia, and other countries where the United States has taken military action in the war on terror. In Afghanistan, he investigates the United States military and government cover-up of the deaths of five civilians, including two pregnant women killed by US soldiers from the Joint Special Operations Command. After investigating the attack, Scahill travels to other sites of JSOC intervention, interviewing both proponents and opponents, and the survivors, of such raids, including U.S. Senator Ron Wyden.

Scahill also investigates the assassinations of American citizens Anwar al-Awlaki and his son Abdulrahman al-Awlaki, meeting with their family at their home in Yemen. Scahill suggests that the war on terror is in fact a "self-fulfilling prophecy" and causes the radicalization of Muslims. He also discusses the case of Yemeni investigative journalist Abdulelah Haider Shaye who was detained, tried and sentenced on terrorism-related charges after reporting on American drone strikes.

== Release ==
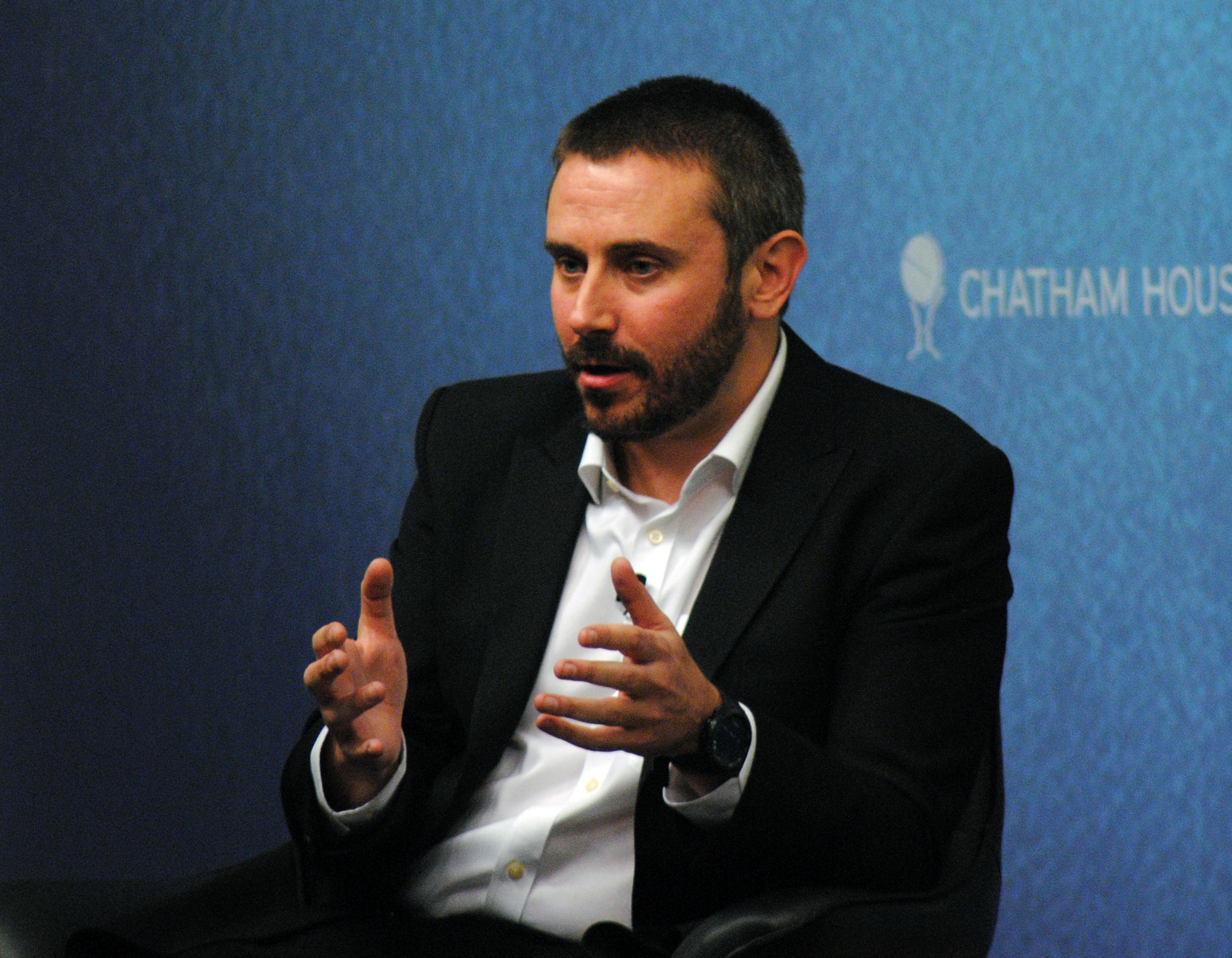
Jeremy Scahill speaking at an event at Chatham House in November 2013, to promote the release of the film in the United Kingdom

Dirty Wars premiered at the 2013 Sundance Film Festival on January 18, 2013. The film competed in the U.S. documentary section, and it won the Cinematography award.

The film was released in four theaters in New York City, Los Angeles, and Washington, DC on June 7, 2013. Over the opening weekend, it grossed an estimated $66,000, a theater average of $16,500. The film opened in British cinemas on November 29, 2013 with showings in nine cities around the country.

== Reception ==
=== Critical reception ===
Dirty Wars received critical acclaim. Review aggregation website Rotten Tomatoes certified the film as "fresh" with a score of 85% based on 71 reviews, and an average rating of 7.40/10.. The website's critical consensus reads, "Some viewers may find fault with director Rick Rowley's filmmaking methods, but they aren't distracting enough to keep Dirty Wars from serving as a terribly compelling argument against elements of American foreign policy.". Metacritic rated the film 76 based on 18 reviews, indicating "generally favorable" reviews. The film obtained a high score of 7.5 out of 10 from the aggregation of more than 6000 votes at the Internet Movie Database.

Trevor Johnston found the film to be a "gripping investigative doc, which plays out like a classic conspiracy thriller as it follows a trail of clues to the heart of darkness behind President Obama’s good-guy facade. Scahill may not have the screen charisma of a Hollywood leading man, but he has the integrity to keep on pushing at closed doors even after threats are made to his personal security. He also widens his focus to include Yemen and Somalia and draws a pattern of state-sanctioned assassination by unchecked US special forces and their mercenary hirelings."

However, Douglas Valentine wrote "...the film is so devoid of historical context, and so contrived, as to render it a work of art, rather than political commentary. And as art, it is pure self-indulgence." Some reviewers criticized the film's focus on Scahill rather than on the issues he covers. Ella Taylor said that "as a journalist Scahill is surely the messenger, not the subject, and the attention he receives in Dirty Wars distracts us from the bigger picture he paints."

=== Accolades ===
Dirty Wars was nominated for a 2013 Academy Award for Best Documentary Feature. Christopher Barnett (Sound Designer at Skywalker Sound) won the 2014 Golden Reel Award for Best Sound Editing: Sound Effects, Foley, Dialogue, ADR and Music in a Feature Documentary, given by the Motion Picture Sound Editors society. The film was also nominated for Best Documentary Screenplay from the Writers Guild of America.

== See also ==
- List of films featuring drones
