= The Girl (2012 independent film) =

2012 film by David Riker

- Theatrical release poster
- Directed by: David Riker
- Written by: David Riker
- Produced by: Paul Mezey
- Starring: Abbie Cornish; Will Patton
- Cinematography: Martín Boege
- Edited by: Malcolm Jamieson; Stephanie Ahn
- Music by: Leonardo Heiblum; Jacobo Lieberman
- Production companies: Journeyman Pictures; Axiom Films; Goldcrest Pictures; Bonita Films; Lulu Producciones; Sin Sentido Films
- Distributed by: Film Collective; Brainstorm Media; Front Row Filmed Entertainment
- Release dates: April 20, 2012 (Tribeca Film Festival); December 14, 2012 (United States)
- Running time: 95 minutes
- Countries: United States, Mexico
- Languages: English, Spanish
- Box office: $35,048

The Girl is an independent film written and directed by David Riker, and starring Abbie Cornish and Will Patton. It debuted at the 2012 Tribeca Film Festival. It opened in select theaters for a one-week awards-qualifying period on December 14, 2012, and had a limited theatrical release in March 2013.

== Synopsis ==
Cornish plays a single mother who helps illegal immigrants to cross the border from Mexico into Texas. A young Mexican girl named Rosa comes into her care.

== Cast ==
- Abbie Cornish as Ashley Colton
- Will Patton as Ashley's father Tommy
- Maritza Santiago Hernandez as Rosa
- Giovanna Zacarías as Enriqueta
- Ángeles Cruz as Rosa's Mother
- Raúl Castillo as Border Agent
- Luis Fernando Peña as Beto
- Isabel Cruz Daza as Edith
- Ivonne Cruz Daza as Cecilia
- Liliana Alberto as Ofelia
- Isabel Sánchez Lara as Rosa's Grandmother

== Reception ==
The Girl has received generally mixed reviews. Review aggregator Rotten Tomatoes reports that 53% of 17 critics gave the film a positive review, with an average rating of 5.2/10. Metacritic, which assigns a weighted average score from 1–100 to reviews from mainstream critics, gave the film a score of 53 based on 11 reviews indicating "mixed or average reviews".
