= Blackwater: The Rise of the World's Most Powerful Mercenary Army =

2007 non-fiction book

- Author: Jeremy Scahill
- Language: English
- Series: Politics
- Publisher: Nation Books
- Publication date: February 15, 2007
- Publication place: United States
- Media type: Print
- Pages: 464
- ISBN: 1-56025-979-5
- OCLC: 84897494
- Dewey Decimal: 355.3/540973 22
- LC Class: DS79.76 .S322 2007

Blackwater: The Rise of the World's Most Powerful Mercenary Army is a book written by independent journalist Jeremy Scahill and published by Nation Books in 2007, as a history and analysis of Blackwater USA, now called Constellis Holdings. It won one of the 2007 George Polk Awards.

== Synopsis ==
The book details the rise of Blackwater USA, a private military company, and the growth of security contracting in the Iraq War and the war on terrorism. In the book, Scahill contends that Blackwater exists as a mercenary force, and argues that Blackwater's rise is a consequence of the demobilization of the US military following the Cold War and its overextension in Iraq and Afghanistan. He argues that the 2004 Fallujah ambush ultimately increased Blackwater's business portfolio. He describes further how Blackwater (at the time of writing) serves in Iraq and Afghanistan like, in his judgement, a Praetorian Guard, protecting top authority figures and enjoying immunity from the usual constraints and regulations on traditional armies. Scahill argues that Blackwater's leadership was motivated by a right-wing Republican ideology, and that its founder, Erik Prince, has provided significant assistance in that venue. Scahill reports that Blackwater forces were also deployed in Sudan and in the aftermath of Hurricane Katrina. Blackwater is also allegedly present in some parts of India, although no sources confirm this existence. Critiquing the book and Scahill, Bruce Bawer writes that Scahill has an "unsettling propensity to improve on facts", and that "Throughout Blackwater, Scahill inflates statistics. "

== Editions ==
- 2007 U.S. hardcover, Nation Books, ISBN 978-1-56025-979-4
- 2007 U.K. hardcover, Serpent's Tail, ISBN 978-1-84668-630-6
- 2008 U.S. paperback, Nation Books, ISBN 978-1-56858-394-5
- The book has been translated into Chinese and Arabic.
