= Vincent Gaughan =

American judge

Vincent Michael Gaughan

Cook County Circuit Court Judge
- Incumbent
- Assumed office 1992

Personal details
- Born: c. 1941
- Citizenship: American
- Education: University of Illinois; DePaul University College of Law
- Occupation: Retired Judge

Military service
- Allegiance: United States of America
- Branch/service: United States Army
- Years of service: ( –1968)
- Rank: Second lieutenant
- Battles/wars: Vietnam War
- Awards: Bronze Star Medal with "V" device

Vincent Michael Gaughan is a Cook County Circuit Court judge in Cook County, Illinois who presided in the historic trial of Jason Van Dyke, the Chicago Police officer who murdered Laquan McDonald.

== Early years ==
Gaughan's parents were Irish immigrants who attended the St. Vincent de Paul Church, their local parish church. He was named "Vincent". Their family home was in Lincoln Park.

== Education ==
In 1964, he earned his Bachelor of Engineering (B.Eng.) at the University of Illinois. He earned his law degree at DePaul University College of Law and was admitted to the Illinois bar in September 1972.

== Career ==
Gaughan joined the army after university and graduated from the Artillery Officer Candidate School in Fort Sill, Oklahoma where he was "commissioned as a second lieutenant. He was awarded the Bronze Star Medal for valor for his service in the Vietnam War (-1968).

He worked in the Cook County public defender's office from 1973 until 1991. He started as a courtroom lawyer. Later he was a "felony trial lawyer supervisor". In 1991, he was appointed to the Cook County, Illinois bench. He was elected as a judge in 1992.

In May and June 2008, he presided over the jury trial of the American singer and record producer, R. Kelly, in which Kelly was acquitted on all counts of child pornography charges. The men were found guilty in the Brown's Chicken massacre case in 2007 and 2009, were convicted in Gaughan's courtroom.

Judge Gaughan presided in the historic trial of Jason Van Dyke, the police officer who murdered the 17-year-old African American Laquan McDonald on October 20, 2014, in Chicago, Illinois. On June 6, 2016, Judge Gaughan agreed to name a special prosecutor for this case. On October 5, 2018, Van Dyke was found guilty of second degree murder. Judge Gaughan set the sentencing hearing date for January 18, 2019 and "lifted a decorum order, which will allow the Chicago Police Board to move ahead with disciplinary action against Van Dyke." The New York Times described it as the case that changed Chicago. A revealing February 10, 2015 article in Slate entitled "Sixteen Shots" by an independent Chicago-based journalist, placed the Chicago Police Department under public scrutiny. (Note: According to Julie Bosman's New York Times article, the key evidence in the case was a controversial police dashboard-camera video showing the accused shooting the victim, that was not presented as evidence until an independent Chicago journalist, Jamie Kalven, revealed its existence. Kalven received a tip from a source in November 2014, a month after the murder took place, which led "Kalven to a civilian who had seen the entire episode". Two months later Kalven read the autopsy report saying that McDonald had been shot 16 times.) In 2015, a year after McDonald's murder, a Cook County judged ordered the City of Chicago to release police dashboard-camera video showing Van Dyke shooting the victim. On December 13, 2017, Judge Gaughan, "quashed a subpoena seeking the reporter Jamie Kalven's testimony, ending a battle over Mr. Kalven’s sources" saying that "the subpoena by the defense lacked specifics and sought 'irrelevant and privileged material'".

An article in the Chicago Tribune, described the case as "another high-profile trial" for Judge M. Gaughan, an "idiosyncratic judge who set the standard for how Cook County handles headline-making cases" in his "ornate courtroom" with a "distant view of Chicago's skyline. According to The New York Times, Judge Gaughan "is viewed as a mercurial jurist." Attorney Steven Greenberg said that "If you’re Jason Van Dyke, I don't think you can ask for a better judge to hear this case. Judge Gaughan is unique and he's certainly opinionated, but he will go out of his way to make sure everyone gets a fair hearing."

== Personal life ==
When Vincent Gaughan returned from Vietnam, he lived with his parents in Lincoln Park. In April 1970, then 28-year-old Gaughan was charged with four counts of aggravated assault after allegedly firing four rounds from an M1 Garand at a neighbor's house. Journalists Steve Bogira and Jim DeRogatis later investigated the allegations and were unable to determine the outcome of the case.

Gaughan has been active in the Illinois branch of the American Legion since the 1990s when he served as its commander.
