= Hell's Army =

2026 American documentary film

- Directed by: Richard Rowley
- Produced by: Richard Rowley; Richard Butler; Atanas Georgiev; Caitlin McNally
- Cinematography: James Butler; Richard Rowley; Tim Grucza; Denis Sinyakov; Scott Munro
- Edited by: Atanas Georgiev
- Music by: Brian McOmber
- Production company: Midnight Films
- Release date: March 16, 2026 (CPH:DOX)
- Running time: 91 minutes
- Country: United States
- Languages: English; Russian; Ukrainian; Arabic

Hell's Army is a 2026 American documentary film directed by Richard Rowley. It follows journalist Katya Hakim as she travels around the world following the activities of Wagner Group.

It had its world premiere at CPH:DOX on March 16, 2026.

== Premise ==
Journalist Katya Hakim travels around the world following the activities of Wagner Group.

== Production ==
Richard Rowley began researching the Wagner Group and talked to journalist Denis Korotkov, who introduced him to The Dossier Center, where he met Katya Hakim and decided to make the film revolving around her.

== Release ==
It had its world premiere at CPH:DOX on March 16, 2026. It will also screen at DC/DOX Film Festival on June 12, 2026, and Sheffield DocFest on June 13, 2026.
