= 16 Shots =

2019 American murder documentary

- DVD cover
- Directed by: Richard Rowley
- Written by: Richard Rowley
- Produced by: Jacqueline Soohen; Jamie Kalven; Karim Hajj
- Cinematography: Richard Rowley; Karim Hajj
- Edited by: Jacqueline Soohen; Francisco Bello
- Music by: Brian McOmber
- Production companies: Midnight Films; Impact Partners; Chicago Media Project; The Bertha Foundation
- Distributed by: Showtime
- Release date: June 7, 2019
- Running time: 100 minutes
- Country: United States
- Language: English

16 Shots is an American documentary film about the murder of Laquan McDonald. Written and directed by Richard Rowley, it is an updated and expanded version of the 2018 movie The Blue Wall. It had a limited theatrical release on June 7, 2019, and started streaming on Showtime on June 14, 2019. It was released on DVD on August 4, 2020.

16 Shots won a News & Documentary Emmy Award for Outstanding Investigative Documentary and a Television Academy Honor and was nominated for a Peabody Award.

== Synopsis ==
16 Shots uses extensive interviews, combined with news reports and scenes of Chicago, to depict the murder of Laquan McDonald and subsequent events.

On October 20, 2014, McDonald, a 17-year-old African-American, was shot to death by Chicago Police officer Jason Van Dyke. The police department initially ruled that the shooting was justifiable self-defense. More than a year later, police dashcam videos were released to the public, showing that McDonald was walking away from police officers when he was shot 16 times. There had been a cover-up of the actual events by members of the police department and various government officials. This caused widespread outrage at a time of national reexamination of the relations between police departments and minority communities. Chicago mayor Rahm Emanuel fired police commissioner Garry McCarthy, Cook County state's attorney Anita Alvarez was voted out of office, and Emanuel himself decided not to run for reelection. Jason Van Dyke, the police officer who shot McDonald, was found guilty of second degree murder and 16 counts of aggravated battery. These events also led to an investigation by the U.S. Department of Justice, and a consent decree for a federal judge to oversee numerous reforms of the Chicago Police Department.

== Production ==
16 Shots is an updated and expanded version of the documentary The Blue Wall. The earlier film, with a running time of 76 minutes, premiered at the Hot Docs film festival in Toronto on May 1, 2018.

== Critical reception ==
Frank Scheck wrote in The Hollywood Reporter, "The film delivers its gripping account in clear, suspenseful fashion and includes news footage from the time and contemporary interviews with many of the principal figures involved... Freelance journalist Jamie Kalven, who covered the story extensively and is one of the film's producers, figures prominently, as do several activists and community leaders.... The filmmaker's intent was obviously to concentrate on the specific incident and its aftermath, but personal details would probably have enhanced the overall emotional impact. Nonetheless, 16 Shots is a worthy addition to what has sadly become a proliferating documentary subgenre."

In RogerEbert.com Brian Tallerico said, "16 Shots isn't as much about the actual shooting of Laquan McDonald as one might expect. We don't hear from his family and friends. Instead, it's about the ripple effect that transformed a city that night.... 16 Shots is a very deliberate, ominous documentary, filled with views of the Chicago skyline and a pulsing score, but Rowley makes several smart decisions as a storyteller. First, he presents both sides. McCarthy, Van Dyke's attorney, Alvarez, and a few spokespeople for the FOP are on-hand to defend their actions..."

In The New York Times Ken Jaworowski wrote, "Rowley interviews activists, witnesses, jurors and police representatives. Their frustrations would be easy to inflame, yet the director and his crew listen closely to what is being said, and allow time for those interviewed to work through their thoughts.... To be sure, the case has been extensively covered in the media, leaving this film to function largely as a summary of the shooting and the trial.... Still, 16 Shots remains valuable as a record of past events that hold sway over the present."

Eric Zorn said in the Chicago Tribune, "... the film shortchanges viewers when it comes to... the cover-up – the brazen, outrageous, wide-ranging and still unpunished official effort to conceal, minimize and outright lie about what happened.... Much of this story will be new for viewers outside the Chicago area, and they'll be riveted by how it unfolded from a seemingly routine news event into a crushing scandal. They'll be justifiably impressed by the range of interview subjects and the effort that director Richard Rowley and producers Jacqueline Soohen and Jamie Kalven made to give both sides of the story time on camera."

In the Chicago Reader Andrea Gronvall wrote, "... by focusing primarily on the crime and its explosive aftermath and very little on McDonald himself, the filmmaker doesn't go far enough in his indictment of the CPD's so-termed "code of silence" because the problem doesn't stop with cover-ups... The fact that the circumstances of [McDonald's] upbringing match those of so many other young Black men in Chicago adds to, not detracts from, a forthright conversation about race."
