= Robert Little (journalist) =

American journalist

Robert Little is an American journalist who is the senior investigations editor for NPR. He previously served as investigations and enterprise editor and earlier, a reporter, for The Baltimore Sun.

Little is a Baltimore native who first worked for the Sun in 1979 as a 13-year-old newspaper delivery boy. He earned his B.S. in mass communication from Towson State University in 1991 and a M.S. in journalism from the Columbia University Graduate School of Journalism.

Little began his reporting career at the Carroll County Times in Westminster, Maryland, where he was a political reporter, before moving to the Virginian-Pilot in Norfolk, Virginia in 1993, where he served as state capital correspondent in Richmond. Little joining the Sun in 1998 as a business reporter covering transportation.

He reported on the defense industry and the Pentagon before becoming national correspondent for the Sun. Little has covered the September 11 attacks, the funeral of Pope John Paul II, the London subway bombings, Hurricane Katrina, Baghdad during the Iraq War, and the 2010 Haiti earthquake. Little's reporting on shortages of medical supplies for troops fighting in Iraq "led to immediate policy changes and corrective measures by the U.S. Army."

Little won a 2006 George Polk Award. Little is a past finalist for a Gerald Loeb Award.

In 2013, he joined NPR as the network's senior investigations editor. In 2021, Little won the Pulitzer Prize for Audio Reporting for his work on the No Compromise podcast with NPR colleagues Lisa Hagen, Chris Haxel, and Graham Smith.

Little lives in Towson, Maryland with his wife, Ann; the couple has five children.

Little co-hosted NPR's White Lies podcast.
