= Richard Rowley (film director) =

American film director

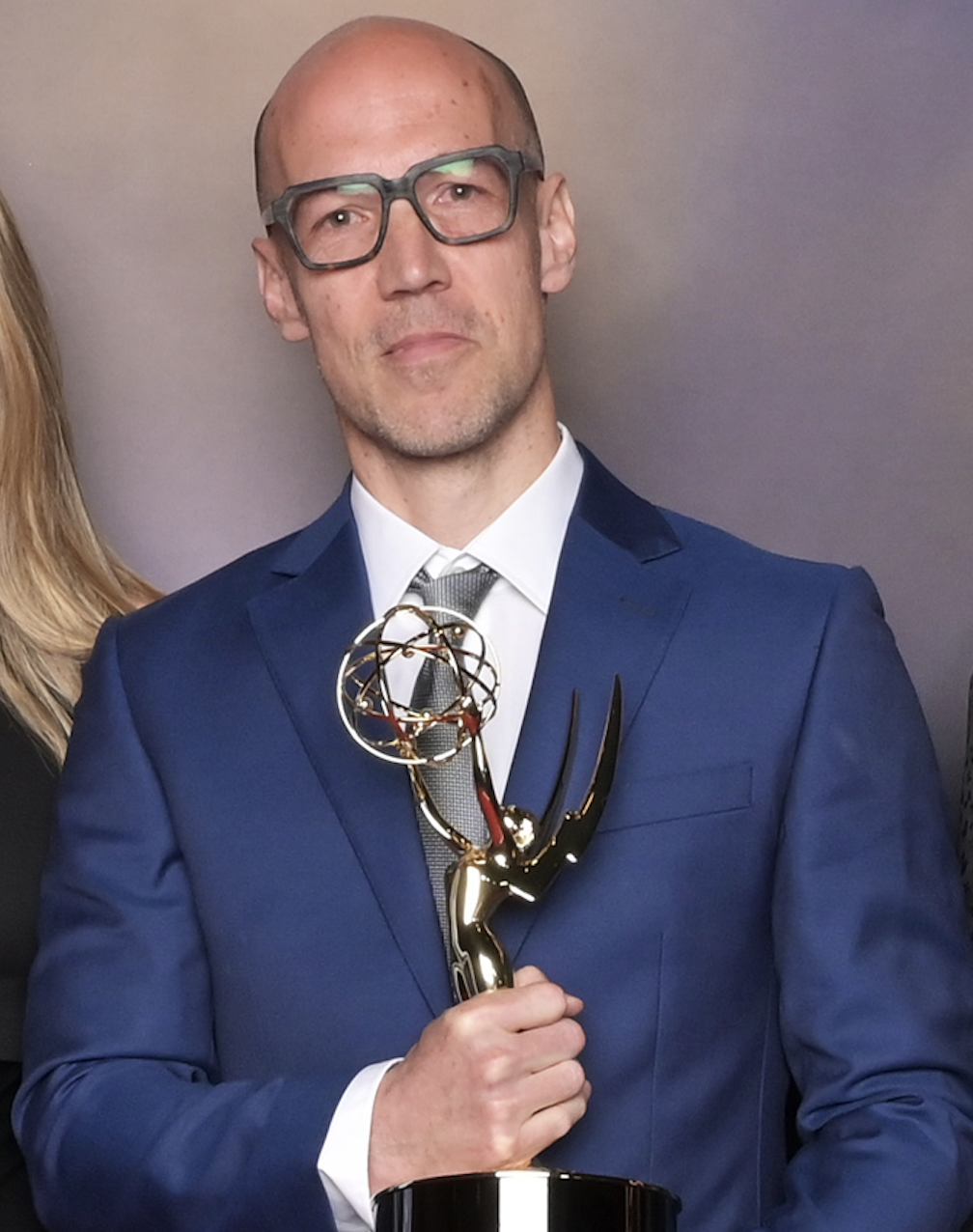
Rowley at the Emmys in 2026

Richard Rowley (also known as Rick Rowley) is a documentary filmmaker. His films and TV shows have received four Emmy awards, an Oscar nomination, and other awards and nominations, as well as recognition at film festivals around the world.

Rowley's Oscar-nominated feature Dirty Wars was the culmination of ten years as a war reporter in Iraq, Afghanistan, and the lesser-known battlegrounds of America's war on terror. Since then, Rowley has turned his lens on racial injustice in the United States. His 2019 feature for Showtime, 16 Shots, won Television Academy honors and a Peabody nomination for its unflinching look at the police murder of Laquan McDonald and the cover-up that followed. His Emmy-winning series Documenting Hate unmasked an underground Nazi fight club and a terrorist cell. The series received a DuPont Award and prompted an FBI investigation that led to dozens of arrests. Kingdom Of Silence, is the story of the life and death of Saudi journalist Jamal Khashoggi.

== Selected filmography ==
Rick Rowley directed or co-directed these documentary films:

- Zapatista (1999) – about the Zapatista uprising in Chiapas, Mexico
- This Is What Democracy Looks Like (2000) – about the 1999 World Trade Organization protests in Seattle
- Black and Gold (2001) – about the Latin Kings in New York City
- The Fourth World War (2003) – about resistance movements around the world
- Dirty Wars (2013) – about the war on terror and the Joint Special Operations Command
- The Blue Wall (2018) – about the murder of Laquan McDonald and subsequent events
- 16 Shots (2019) – an updated and expanded version of The Blue Wall
- Kingdom of Silence (2020) – about the killing of Jamal Khashoggi
- American Insurrection (2021) – about the 2021 United States Capitol attack
- Critical Incident: Death at the Border (2025) – about the death of Anastasio Hernández-Rojas
- Hell's Army (2026) – about the Wagner Group

== Awards ==
- 2014 Academy Award Nomination – Best Documentary
- 2013 Sundance Film Festival – Documentary Cinematography Award
- 2022 Emmy Nominee – Outstanding Current Events Documentary
- 2021 Emmy Winner – Outstanding Politics Documentary
- 2020 Emmy Winner – Outstanding Investigative Documentary
- 2019 Emmy Winner – Outstanding Investigative Documentary
- 2020 Television Academy Honors Winner – Documentary
- 2020 DuPont Columbia Award
- 2022 DuPont Columbia Award
- 2022 George Polk Award
- 2022 Peabody Award
- 2022 Edward R Murrow Award
- 2023 Scripps Howard Award
- 2025 Emmy Winner – Outstanding Investigative Documentary
