= Somebody (podcast) =

American true-crime podcast

- Genre: True crime
- Language: English

Cast and voices
- Hosted by: Shapearl Wells; Alison Flowers

Music
- Opening theme: "Everybody's Something"
- Composed by: Chance the Rapper

Production
- Length: Variable (30-70 minutes)

Technical specifications
- Audio format: Podcast (via streaming or downloadable MP3)

Publication
- No. of seasons: 1
- Original release: March 31, 2020
- Provider: iHeartRadio; The Intercept; Tenderfoot TV; The Invisible Institute; Topic Studios
- Updates: Weekly

Related
- Website: somebodypodcast.com

Somebody is an American true crime podcast, hosted by Shapearl Wells, that investigates the shooting and death of her son, Courtney Copeland. The series premiered on March 31, 2020 and is hosted by Copeland's mother Shapearl Wells, Alison Flowers, and Bill Healy. The podcast was a Pulitzer Prize finalist in 2021.

== Background ==
On March 4, 2016, 22-year-old Courtney Copeland was shot in the back and drove himself to a police station on the West Side of Chicago. Copeland exited his BMW convertible and collapsed. He was taken by ambulance to Advocate Illinois Masonic Medical Center. His heart stopped while in the ambulance and he was pronounced dead shortly after arriving at the hospital. After his death, police details, phone records, and witness statements did not match, so Copeland's mother, Shapearl Wells, began investigating his case, hoping to find the truth about her son's death. In 2017, Wells met with Alison Flowers, a journalist who works at The Invisible Institute in Chicago. They decided to record and produce an investigative podcast with hopes of finding the truth. Wells also founded the Copeland Memorial Foundation in Courtney's honor. Copeland attended Jones College Prep High School, where he became friends with Chance the Rapper, who is interviewed in the series and whose song is used as the theme.

== Episodes ==
No.	Title	Length (minutes:seconds)	Original release date
1	"Courtney"	30:42	March 31, 2020
Shapearl Wells wakes up to the police at her door, who inform her that her son, Courtney Copeland, has been shot and is in the hospital. When Wells arrives at the hospital, she learns that Courtney has died. Wells begins to discuss the case with the police, but as they ask Wells questions she becomes suspicious of the police officers involved in Courtney's case.
2	"The Nurse"	32:37	April 7, 2020
At a cafe, Courtney's parents ran into the Emergency Room nurse who treated Courtney on the night of his death. The nurse reveals that Courtney was handcuffed when he arrived at the hospital, leading Shapearl to further question the police testimony.
3	"The Police"	70:26	April 14, 2020
The City of Chicago refuses to release video footage from the night Courtney died, leading Wells to contact The Invisible Institute, a journalism organization. Eventually, the police release the video footage, and Shapearl and her family watch the footage, which reveals that some of their prior suspicions may have been misguided.
4	"The Secret Girlfriend"	47:24	April 21, 2020
At the time of his death, Courtney was secretly dating a woman from his work, Alma. He was on his way to her house when he was shot. Shapearl, Alison, and Billy interview Alma about the night of his death, and she reveals that she heard gunshots on that night.
5	"The Two-Year Anniversary"	29:03	April 28, 2020
Shapearl and Alison speak with Alma's neighbors who called the police to report gunshots on the night Courtney died. On the two-year anniversary of Courtney's death, Shapearl retraces Courtney's steps from the night he died, joined by friends and family, who meet outside of the police station for a vigil and protest. During the protest, Shapearl encounters the supervising police officer from the night Courtney died.
6	"The Tipster"	43:21	May 5, 2020
7	"Shapearl"	31:58	May 12, 2020

== Awards ==
Award	Date	Category	Recipient	Result	Ref.
Third Coast International Audio Festival	2020	Best Serialized Story	Somebody	Won	
Adweek Podcast Awards	2020	Podcast Host of the Year	Shapearl Wells	Won	
Pulitzer Prize for Audio Reporting	2020	Audio Reporting	Somebody (Episodes 1-7)	Finalist	

== See also ==
- List of American crime podcasts

== See also ==
- Whence Came You
