= Pulitzer Prize for Audio Reporting =

American journalism award

The Pulitzer Prize for Audio Reporting is one of the Pulitzer Prizes for American journalism. It recognizes distinguished reporting on a radio program or podcast.

== History ==
The award was announced in December 2019, and given for the first time in 2020.

== List of winners ==
=== 2020s ===
Year	Name(s)	Publication	Citation
2020	Emily Green	Vice News	"for The Out Crowd, revelatory, intimate journalism that illuminates the personal impact of the Trump Administration's 'Remain in Mexico' policy."
2020	Molly O'Toole	Los Angeles Times	"for The Out Crowd, revelatory, intimate journalism that illuminates the personal impact of the Trump Administration's 'Remain in Mexico' policy."
2020	Staff	This American Life	"for The Out Crowd, revelatory, intimate journalism that illuminates the personal impact of the Trump Administration's 'Remain in Mexico' policy."
2020	Nicole Beemsterboer	National Public Radio	"for White Lies, a riveting seven-episode podcast that doggedly reinvestigated one of the most infamous murders of the Civil Rights era."
2020	Chip Brantley	National Public Radio	"for White Lies, a riveting seven-episode podcast that doggedly reinvestigated one of the most infamous murders of the Civil Rights era."
2020	Andrew Beck Grace	National Public Radio	"for White Lies, a riveting seven-episode podcast that doggedly reinvestigated one of the most infamous murders of the Civil Rights era."
2020	Robert Little	National Public Radio	"for White Lies, a riveting seven-episode podcast that doggedly reinvestigated one of the most infamous murders of the Civil Rights era."
2020	Graham Smith	National Public Radio	"for White Lies, a riveting seven-episode podcast that doggedly reinvestigated one of the most infamous murders of the Civil Rights era."
2020	Nigel Poor	Ear Hustle	"for Ear Hustle, a consistently surprising and beautifully crafted series on life behind bars produced by inmates of San Quentin State Prison."
2020	Rahsaan Thomas	Ear Hustle	"for Ear Hustle, a consistently surprising and beautifully crafted series on life behind bars produced by inmates of San Quentin State Prison."
2020	Earlonne Woods	Ear Hustle	"for Ear Hustle, a consistently surprising and beautifully crafted series on life behind bars produced by inmates of San Quentin State Prison."
2021	Lisa Hagen	WABE	"for an investigative series on 'no compromise' gun rights activists that illuminated the profound differences and deepening schism between American conservatives."
2021	Chris Haxel	KCUR	"for an investigative series on 'no compromise' gun rights activists that illuminated the profound differences and deepening schism between American conservatives."
2021	Robert Little	National Public Radio	"for an investigative series on 'no compromise' gun rights activists that illuminated the profound differences and deepening schism between American conservatives."
2021	Graham Smith	National Public Radio	"for an investigative series on 'no compromise' gun rights activists that illuminated the profound differences and deepening schism between American conservatives."
2021	Staff	The Intercept	"for Somebody, a dogged and searing investigation of the murder of a young Black man in Chicago and the institutional indifference surrounding it."
2021	Staff	Invisible Institute	"for Somebody, a dogged and searing investigation of the murder of a young Black man in Chicago and the institutional indifference surrounding it."
2021	Staff	Topic Studios	"for Somebody, a dogged and searing investigation of the murder of a young Black man in Chicago and the institutional indifference surrounding it."
2021	Staff	National Public Radio	"for courageous on-the-ground reporting on the assassination of Iranian General Qasem Soleimani and its implications around the globe."
2022	Staff	Futuro Media	"for Suave, a brutally honest and immersive profile of a man reentering society after serving more than 30 years in prison."
2022	Staff	Public Radio Exchange	"for Suave, a brutally honest and immersive profile of a man reentering society after serving more than 30 years in prison."
2022	Alsanosi Adam	National Public Radio	"for their compelling, accessible and empathetic stories on the complicated war and threats to democracy in East Africa, an area of the world that rarely gets sustained coverage."
2022	Halima Athumani	National Public Radio	"for their compelling, accessible and empathetic stories on the complicated war and threats to democracy in East Africa, an area of the world that rarely gets sustained coverage."
2022	Solomon Fisseha	National Public Radio	"for their compelling, accessible and empathetic stories on the complicated war and threats to democracy in East Africa, an area of the world that rarely gets sustained coverage."
2022	Eyder Peralta	National Public Radio	"for their compelling, accessible and empathetic stories on the complicated war and threats to democracy in East Africa, an area of the world that rarely gets sustained coverage."
2022	Reid Cherlin	NBC News	"for Southlake, a riveting and insightful account of an anti-critical race theory movement in a Texas community, a phenomenon that has reverberated through school districts across the country."
2022	Mike Hixenbaugh	NBC News	"for Southlake, a riveting and insightful account of an anti-critical race theory movement in a Texas community, a phenomenon that has reverberated through school districts across the country."
2022	Antonia Hylton	NBC News	"for Southlake, a riveting and insightful account of an anti-critical race theory movement in a Texas community, a phenomenon that has reverberated through school districts across the country."
2022	Frannie Kelley	NBC News	"for Southlake, a riveting and insightful account of an anti-critical race theory movement in a Texas community, a phenomenon that has reverberated through school districts across the country."
2022	Julie Shapiro	NBC News	"for Southlake, a riveting and insightful account of an anti-critical race theory movement in a Texas community, a phenomenon that has reverberated through school districts across the country."
2023	Connie Walker	Gimlet Media	"Whose investigation into her father's troubled past revealed a larger story of abuse of hundreds of Indigenous children at an Indian residential school in Canada, including other members of Walker's extended family, a personal search for answers expertly blended with rigorous investigative reporting."
2023	Staff	Gimlet Media	"Whose investigation into her father's troubled past revealed a larger story of abuse of hundreds of Indigenous children at an Indian residential school in Canada, including other members of Walker's extended family, a personal search for answers expertly blended with rigorous investigative reporting."
2023	Jenn Abelson	The Washington Post	"for Broken Doors, a powerful examination of the human toll of no-knock warrants across the country, using the voices of police, judges and the victims of the surprise raids, reporting that led to policy changes and, in one case, to prosecutors dropping a death penalty request."
2023	Nicole Dungca	The Washington Post	"for Broken Doors, a powerful examination of the human toll of no-knock warrants across the country, using the voices of police, judges and the victims of the surprise raids, reporting that led to policy changes and, in one case, to prosecutors dropping a death penalty request."
2023	Reena Flores	The Washington Post	"for Broken Doors, a powerful examination of the human toll of no-knock warrants across the country, using the voices of police, judges and the victims of the surprise raids, reporting that led to policy changes and, in one case, to prosecutors dropping a death penalty request."
2023	Linah Mohammad	The Washington Post	"for Broken Doors, a powerful examination of the human toll of no-knock warrants across the country, using the voices of police, judges and the victims of the surprise raids, reporting that led to policy changes and, in one case, to prosecutors dropping a death penalty request."
2023	Sabby Robinson	The Washington Post	"for Broken Doors, a powerful examination of the human toll of no-knock warrants across the country, using the voices of police, judges and the victims of the surprise raids, reporting that led to policy changes and, in one case, to prosecutors dropping a death penalty request."
2023	Sarah Hulett	Michigan Radio	"for a visceral documentary recorded behind the closed doors of an abortion clinic, allowing listeners to hear conversations between practitioners and patients, and the controversial procedure itself."
2023	Paulette Parker	Michigan Radio	"for a visceral documentary recorded behind the closed doors of an abortion clinic, allowing listeners to hear conversations between practitioners and patients, and the controversial procedure itself."
2023	Lindsey Smith	Michigan Radio	"for a visceral documentary recorded behind the closed doors of an abortion clinic, allowing listeners to hear conversations between practitioners and patients, and the controversial procedure itself."
2023	Laura Weber-Davis	Michigan Radio	"for a visceral documentary recorded behind the closed doors of an abortion clinic, allowing listeners to hear conversations between practitioners and patients, and the controversial procedure itself."
2023	Kate Wells	Michigan Radio	"for a visceral documentary recorded behind the closed doors of an abortion clinic, allowing listeners to hear conversations between practitioners and patients, and the controversial procedure itself."
2024	Staff	Invisible Institute	"for a powerful series that revisits a Chicago hate crime from the 1990s, a fluid amalgam of memoir, community history and journalism."
2024	Staff	USG Audio	"for a powerful series that revisits a Chicago hate crime from the 1990s, a fluid amalgam of memoir, community history and journalism."
2024	Daniel Barrick	New Hampshire Public Radio	"for their gripping and extensively reported investigation of corruption and sexual abuse within the lucrative recovery industry that sought accountability despite legal pressure."
2024	Lauren Chooljian	New Hampshire Public Radio	"for their gripping and extensively reported investigation of corruption and sexual abuse within the lucrative recovery industry that sought accountability despite legal pressure."
2024	Katie Colaneri	New Hampshire Public Radio	"for their gripping and extensively reported investigation of corruption and sexual abuse within the lucrative recovery industry that sought accountability despite legal pressure."
2024	Alison MacAdam	New Hampshire Public Radio	"for their gripping and extensively reported investigation of corruption and sexual abuse within the lucrative recovery industry that sought accountability despite legal pressure."
2024	Jason Moon	New Hampshire Public Radio	"for their gripping and extensively reported investigation of corruption and sexual abuse within the lucrative recovery industry that sought accountability despite legal pressure."
2024	Dan Slepian	NBC News	"for their relentless 20-year investigation that resulted in a wrongfully-convicted man finally receiving clemency."
2024	Preeti Varathan	NBC News	"for their relentless 20-year investigation that resulted in a wrongfully-convicted man finally receiving clemency."
2025	Staff	The New Yorker	"for their In the Dark podcast, a combination of compelling storytelling and relentless reporting in the face of obstacles from the U.S. military, a four-year investigation into one of the most high-profile crimes of the Iraq War—the murder of 25 unarmed Iraqi civilians in Haditha."
2025	Morgan Jones	Wondery	"for Hysterical, a fascinating series that traced the outbreak of a mysterious and apparently contagious nerve disorder in Upstate New York that largely affected young women, and the frustrating efforts to identify it."
2025	Marshall Lewy	Wondery	"for Hysterical, a fascinating series that traced the outbreak of a mysterious and apparently contagious nerve disorder in Upstate New York that largely affected young women, and the frustrating efforts to identify it."
2025	Henry Molofsky	Pineapple Street Studios	"for Hysterical, a fascinating series that traced the outbreak of a mysterious and apparently contagious nerve disorder in Upstate New York that largely affected young women, and the frustrating efforts to identify it."
2025	Dan Taberski	Pineapple Street Studios	"for Hysterical, a fascinating series that traced the outbreak of a mysterious and apparently contagious nerve disorder in Upstate New York that largely affected young women, and the frustrating efforts to identify it."
2025	Staff	Gothamist	"for their revelatory investigation into decades of sexual assault of female inmates on Rikers Island."
2025	Staff	WNYC	"for their revelatory investigation into decades of sexual assault of female inmates on Rikers Island."
2026	Staff	Pablo Torre Finds Out	"for a pioneering and entertaining form of live podcast journalism that investigated how the Los Angeles Clippers seemingly evaded the NBA's salary cap rules by funneling money to a star player through an environmental startup."
2026	Valerie Bauerlein	The Wall Street Journal	"for 'Camp Swamp Road,' which uses extraordinary archival audio to investigate a 2023 fatal shooting and the flawed implementation of stand-your-ground laws."
2026	Rachel Humphreys	The Wall Street Journal	"for 'Camp Swamp Road,' which uses extraordinary archival audio to investigate a 2023 fatal shooting and the flawed implementation of stand-your-ground laws."
2026	Colin McNulty	The Wall Street Journal	"for 'Camp Swamp Road,' which uses extraordinary archival audio to investigate a 2023 fatal shooting and the flawed implementation of stand-your-ground laws."
2026	Heather Rogers	The Wall Street Journal	"for 'Camp Swamp Road,' which uses extraordinary archival audio to investigate a 2023 fatal shooting and the flawed implementation of stand-your-ground laws."
2026	Nathan Singhapok	The Wall Street Journal	"for 'Camp Swamp Road,' which uses extraordinary archival audio to investigate a 2023 fatal shooting and the flawed implementation of stand-your-ground laws."
2026	Azeen Ghorayshi	The New York Times	"for 'The Protocol,' their comprehensive investigation of youth gender medicine, exploring its origins and uses, helping to illuminate one of the most controversial policy debates of our time."
2026	Austin Mitchell	The New York Times	"for 'The Protocol,' their comprehensive investigation of youth gender medicine, exploring its origins and uses, helping to illuminate one of the most controversial policy debates of our time."
