= The City (1998 film) =

- Theatrical release poster
- Directed by: David Riker
- Written by: David Riker
- Produced by: Paul S. Mezey; David Riker
- Cinematography: Harlan Bosmajian
- Edited by: David Riker
- Music by: Tony Adzinikolov
- Distributed by: Zeitgeist Films
- Release dates: September 13, 1998 (Toronto International Film Festival); October 22, 1999 (New York City)
- Running time: 88 minutes
- Country: United States
- Languages: English; Spanish; Korean
- Budget: $500,000
- Box office: $100,000

The City (Spanish: La ciudad) is a 1998 American neo-realist film written and directed by David Riker, his first feature film, and shot in grainy black-and-white film stock. The drama features actor Joseph Rigano and, in neo-realist fashion, an ensemble cast of non-professional actors. The film is also known as: The City (La Ciudad).

The drama consists of four vignettes that plunges you onto New York City's poorer neighborhoods where Latin American immigrants, many of whom barely speak English, live at the mercy of exploitative employers and inflexible institutions. Many of the characters are in the United States illegally to make money in order to send back home to their poor families.

The picture won numerous awards including the Organisation Catholique Internationale du Cinéma et de l'Audiovisuel (OCIC Award) at the San Sebastián International Film Festival.

== Plot ==
Among intermittent scenes of Latin Americans having their photo taken by a photographer, the four stories in the picture include:

Bricks (Ladrillos): a group of Latino men wait on a street corner for someone to hire them. A contractor appears in a truck and selects 10 men and promises each $50 for a day of work. But after they are dropped off across the Hudson River in a dusty lot where a building has been demolished, the terms of employment are revised by the contractor. They are to clean up bricks and do it on a piecemeal basis (15 cents a brick). The men are not happy but mush on nevertheless. An accident happens and the men are unable to help the victim and appear helpless in their fate.

Home (Casa): a young man named Francisco newly arrived in New York strays into a "sweet 15" party and meets a serious young woman named Maria who turns out to be from the same Mexican town. Because he has no place to stay, she takes him home to her uncle's house. The next morning when he goes to buy some groceries for breakfast, he can't find his way back.

The Puppeteer (Titiritero): is a homeless street performer named Luis who is suffering from tuberculosis and lives with his daughter Dulce in an old station wagon. Hearing that every child in the city is guaranteed an education, the puppeteer, who has refused to stay in city shelters because of contagious diseases, attempts to enroll his daughter in school but is unable to prove he lives in New York City.

Seamstress (Costurera): in the final and politically incendiary vignette, a woman named Ana works in a sweatshop where no one has been paid for several weeks. She receives news from home that her daughter has fallen ill and needs $400 for an operation. She pleads with her bosses for her back pay but she's threatened with dismissal.

== Cast ==
Professional actors

- Joseph Rigano as The Contractor
- Mateo Gómez as Man (Bricks story)
- José Rabelo as Luis, The Father (Puppeteer story)
- Teresa Yenque as Consuelo (Seamstress story)
- Taek Limb Hyoung as Sweatshop Manager (Seamstress story)
- Jawon Kim as Sweatshop Manager (Seamstress story)

Non-professional actors

- Antonio Peralta as The Photographer

Bricks

- Fernando Reyes as Jose
- Anthony Rivera as The Boy
- Miguel Maldonado as The Organizer
- Ricardo Cuevas as Man
- Moisés García as Man
- Marcos Martínez García as Man
- Cezar Monzón as Man
- Harsh Nayyar as Man
- Víctor Sierra as Man
- Carlos Torrentes as Man

Home

- Cipriano García as Francisco, the Young Man
- Leticia Herrera as Maria, the Young Woman

The Puppeteer

- Stephanie Viruet as Dulce, the Daughter
- Gene Ruffini as The City Worker
- Eileen Vega as The Health Worker
- Denia Brache as The Friend
- Marta de la Cruz as The School Registrar

Seamstress

- Silvia Goiz as Ana, the Seamstress
- Rosa Caguana as Friend
- Guillermina De Jesus as Friend
- Betty Mendoza as Friend
- Ángeles Rubio as Friend

== Production ==
David Riker spent five years researching the project (1992-1997), and worked with the non-professional actors in order to capture the "impoverished authenticity of life on the streets" of the Latino community in New York City. The film was shot on 16mm.

== Release ==
The film was first screened at the Toronto International Film Festival in 1998 before appearing at other festivals, including the Sundance Film Festival. However, it took a long while to find a distributor, until Zeitgeist Films agreed to distribute it. They released it October 22, 1999 and it grossed $125,000 in a 10-week run. It was re-released in three New York City theaters by Echo Lake in areas with a high Latino population over the Martin Luther King Jr. weekend where it grossed $12,976. Zeitgeist also re-released it in four arthouse theaters in other US cities.

=== Home media ===
A DVD of the film was released by New Yorker Video on June 7, 2005. The DVD includes the featurette: The Making of a Community Film.

In a DVD review of the DVD, technology critic Gary W. Tooze, wrote, "New Yorker have drastically improved their DVD packages in the past few months with strong extra feature additions, but their image quality appears to have plateau'd. This is non-anamorphic and exhibits minor coming in spots (non-progressive) but much of the inferiority of the image is a function of the independent manner in which it was produced...The featurette addition is a super extra and helps further appreciation of this fine film. Even with the weak image we strongly recommend!"

== Reception ==
=== Critical response ===
The film critic for The New York Times, Stephen Holden, lauded then film when it was released, and wrote,"The City doesn't go out of its way to pull your heartstrings, but its understatement makes it all the more devastating. The anxious, careworn faces of downtrodden people who have no choice but to continue as best they can convey their plight more powerfully than any words. New Yorkers will recognize these faces. There are tens of thousands of them. They're only too glad to do our dirty work."

Film critic Roger Ebert also liked the film and its message and wrote," [The City is] a direct, spare, touching film developed by Riker during six years of acting workshops with immigrants in New York City...Finally [the film] is making its way around the country, at venues like the Film Center at the School of the Art Institute of Chicago. It is a film that would have great power for Spanish-speaking working people, who of course are unlikely to find it at the Film Center. Eventually on television, it may find a broader audience. It gives faces to the faceless and is not easily forgotten.

Edward Guthmann, the San Francisco Chronicle staff critic, wrote of the film, "[The City] is Riker's first film and a lovely realization of his humanist dream. Honest and unvarnished, it succeeds in drawing us inside a world—the Latin American immigrant culture of New York—that we typically see only from its periphery." Yet, Guthman thought the film was uneven and he added, "Seamstress" is the strongest vignette in The City, and unfortunately the rest of the film doesn't match its impact. The first piece, "Bricks," is slow in starting, and the second, "Home," is emotionally flat and can't mask the amateurishness of the leads. The City has its awkward and rough edges, but there's a purity here, a goodness of intention and a commitment to justice.

=== Awards ===
Wins

- San Sebastián International Film Festival: OCIC Award (Organisation Catholique Internationale du Cinéma et de l'Audiovisuel), David Riker. This is an additional special award; 1998.
- Havana Film Festival: Coral, Best Work of a Non-Latin American Director on a Latin America Subject, David Riker; 1998.
- Gotham Awards: Open Palm Award, David Riker; 1999.
- Human Rights Watch International Film Festival: Nestor Almendros Award, David Riker; Tied with Regret to Inform; 1999.
- XSW Film Festival: SXSW Competition Award, Narrative Feature, David Riker; 1999.
- San Antonio CineFestival: Premio Mesquite Award, Best Feature Film, David Riker; 1999.
- Santa Barbara International Film Festival: Independent Voice Award, David Riker; Lumina Award, Harlan Bosmajian; 1999.
- Taos Talking Picture Festival: Taos Land Grant Award, David Riker; 1999.

Nominated

- Independent Spirit Awards: Independent Spirit Award, Best Cinematography, Harlan Bosmajian; Best First Feature - Under $500,000, David Riker (director/producer) and Paul S. Mezey (producer); Producers Award, Paul S. Mezey; 2000.
