= Emily Green =

Journalist; recipient of 2020 Pulitzer Prize

- Education: George Washington University
- Occupation: Journalist
- Known for: Recipient of 2020 Pulitzer Prize for Audio Reporting
- Notable work: "Episode 688: The Out Crowd"

Emily T. Green is a Mexico City-based journalist whose work focuses on immigration. In May 2020, Green was one of the inaugural recipients of the Pulitzer Prize for Audio Reporting for her work with This American Life concerning the personal impact of the "Remain in Mexico" policy. Green is notable as one of few freelance journalists to have been awarded a Pulitzer Prize. In 2021, Green won an Emmy award for her coverage of children being trained to fight drug cartels in the Mexican state of Guerrero.

== Education ==
Green received a bachelor's degree in political communication from George Washington University in 2005. In 2006–2007, she received a Fulbright Scholarship to report on human rights abuses in the Philippines.

== Awards ==
- 2020 – The Pulitzer Prize for Audio Reporting.
- 2021 – Emmy Award for Outstanding Short Feature Story in a Newscast.
