= Molly O'Toole =

American immigration and security reporter

- Education: New York University; Cornell University
- Occupation: Journalist
- Employer: Los Angeles Times
- Known for: Recipient of 2020 Pulitzer Prize for Audio Reporting
- Notable work: Episode 688: The Out Crowd

Molly O'Toole is an American reporter whose work focuses on immigration and security. In May 2020, O'Toole was one of the inaugural recipients of the Pulitzer Prize for Audio Reporting for her work with This American Life concerning the personal impact of the Remain in Mexico Policy.

== Education ==
O’Toole graduated from University of San Diego High School in 2005 where she could not participate in the school newspaper due to her sports schedule. She then studied English as an undergraduate at Cornell University, where no journalism major is offered, graduating cum laude in 2009. In 2011, she received a dual master's degree in journalism and international relations from New York University. At Cornell, she ran for the varsity cross country and track teams and was an editor for The Cornell Daily Sun.

In May 2020, O'Toole credited much of her journalism training to The Sun, saying, "Everything I learned about journalism, and really about life, came from The Cornell Daily Sun."

== Awards ==
- 2020 – The Pulitzer Prize for Audio Reporting.
