= David Riker =

American screenwriter and film director

David Riker is an American screenwriter and film director. He is best known for his award-winning film The City (La Ciudad), a neo-realist film about the plight of Latin American immigrants living in New York City. Riker is also the writer and director of The Girl (2012), and the co-writer of the films Sleep Dealer (2008) and Dirty Wars (2013).

Born in Boston, Riker moved to Brussels, Belgium, at the age of five, where he attended a French-speaking school. In 1973 his family moved to London, where he studied at The American School.

Riker is a graduate of New York University's Graduate Film School where, in 1992, he made his first fictional film, The City (which became "The Puppeteer" story in the feature The City (La Ciudad) (1998)). The short received critical acclaim and, among other accolades, won the Gold Medal for Dramatic Film at the Student Academy Awards and the Student Film Award from the Directors Guild of America.

== Filmography ==
- The Many Faces of Paper (1988) (short-documentary)
- The City (1998) aka The City (La Ciudad)
- Sleep Dealer (2008)
- The Girl (2012)
- Dirty Wars (2013)

== Awards ==
Wins

- Student Academy Awards: Gold Medal, Dramatic, for La Ciudad; New York University, 1995.
- Directors Guild of America: Best Student Film Award for La Ciudad; New York University; 1995.
- San Sebastián International Film Festival: OCIC Special Award for La Ciudad; 1998.
- Havana International Film Festival: Coral, Best Work by a Non-Latin American Director on a Latin America Subject; 1998.
- Gotham Awards: Open Palm Award for Breakthrough Director; 1999.
- Human Rights Watch International Film Festival: Nestor Almendros Award; Tied with Regret to Inform; 1999.
- SXSW Film Festival: SXSW Competition Award, Best Narrative Feature; 1999.
- San Antonio CineFestival: Premio Mesquite Award, Best Feature Film; 1999.
- Santa Barbara International Film Festival: Independent Voice Award; 1999.
- Taos Talking Picture Festival: Taos Land Grant Award; 1999.
- Sundance Film Festival: Waldo Salt Screenwriting Award, shared with Alex Rivera, for Sleep Dealer; 2008.
- Sundance Film Festival: Alfred P. Sloan Feature Film Prize, shared with Alex Rivera, for Sleep Dealer; 2008.
- Sundance Film Festival: NHK Award, Best American Screenplay for The Girl; 2010.
- San Antonio CineFestival: Premio Mesquite Award, Best Feature Film for The Girl; 2014.

Nominated

- Independent Spirit Awards: Independent Spirit Award, Best First Feature - Under $500,000, David Riker (director/producer) and Paul S. Mezey (producer); 2000.
- Tribeca Film Festival: Best Narrative Feature, for The Girl; 2012
- Writers Guild of America, USA; WGA Award (Screen), Best Documentary Screenplay, shared with Jeremy Scahill, for Dirty Wars; 2014.
