= Art Acevedo =

American police chief (born 1964)

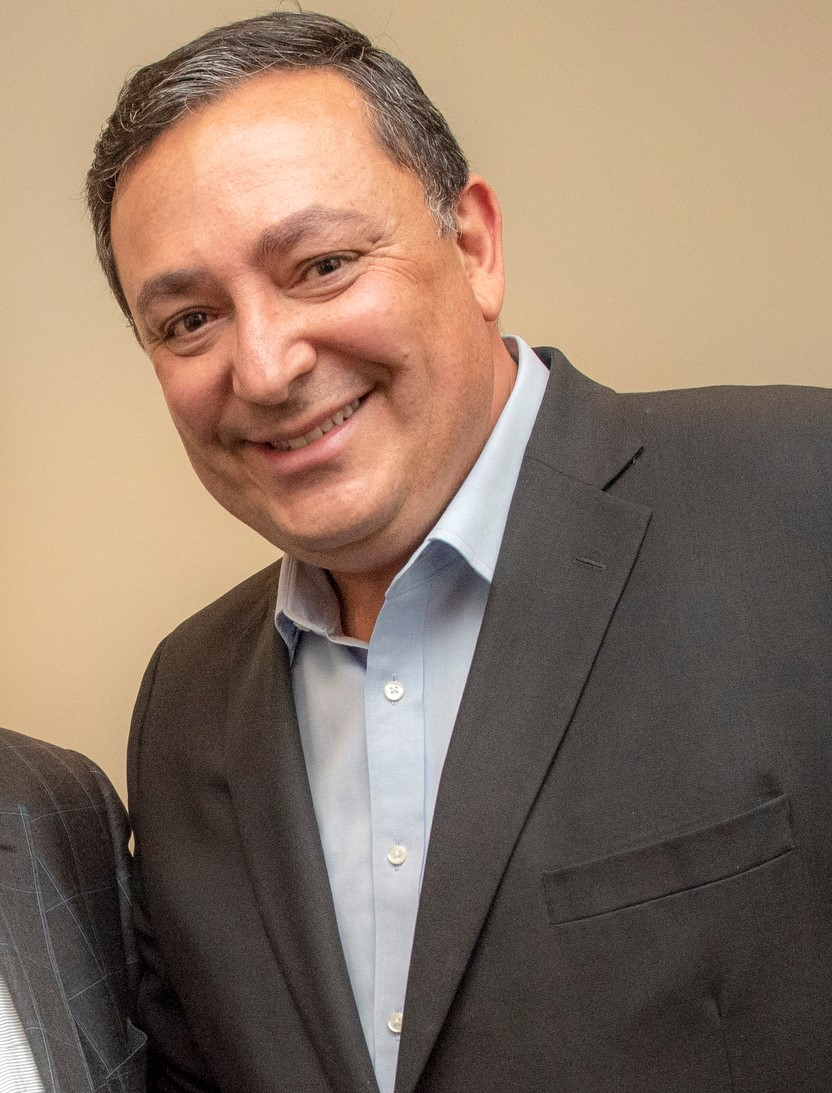
- Acevedo in 2019

Acting Chief of the Aurora Police Department
- In office December 5, 2022 – January 22, 2024
- Preceded by: Daniel J. Oates

Chief of the Miami Police Department
- In office April 5, 2021 – October 14, 2021
- Preceded by: Jorge Colina
- Succeeded by: Manuel A. Morales

Chief of the Houston Police Department
- In office November 30, 2016 – April 4, 2021
- Preceded by: Martha Montalvo
- Succeeded by: Troy Finner

Chief of the Austin Police Department
- In office July 2007 – November 29, 2016
- Preceded by: Cathy Ellison
- Succeeded by: Brian Manley

Personal details
- Born: Hubert Arturo Acevedo; July 31, 1964 (age 62) Havana, Cuba
- Spouse: Tanya Born
- Education: Rio Hondo College (AA), University of La Verne (BS)
- Website: Art Acevedo on X

Hubert Arturo Acevedo (born July 31, 1964) is an American public official and former police officer who most recently served as the interim chief of police in Aurora, Colorado. Prior to this, he served as the chief of police in Austin, Houston, and Miami. Acevedo began his law enforcement career with the California Highway Patrol.

== Background and education ==
Acevedo was born in Havana, Cuba in 1964, immigrating to the United States at age four with his family in 1968. His father was a police officer in Havana. Acevedo grew up in El Monte, California, becoming a naturalized citizen in 1985. He attended Rio Hondo College, graduating in 1986 with an associate degree in communications. In 2005, Acevedo graduated from University of La Verne with a bachelor's degree in public administration.

== Career ==
=== California Highway Patrol ===
Acevedo began his career as a field patrol officer in East Los Angeles with the California Highway Patrol (CHP) in 1986 after graduation from their training academy. He rose to the rank of chief with CHP in 2005.

In 2008, Acevedo received a settlement of almost $1 million from CHP in connection to a harassment lawsuit. The suit alleged that he was retaliated against by CHP commissioner Dwight "Spike" Helmick after applying for the position of CHP chief. According to Acevedo's attorney, Helmick improperly shared information from a confidential investigation into sexual harassment claims against Acevedo. During the 2004 sexual harassment investigation, multiple officers stated that Acevedo, while on duty, showed them nude photographs of a fellow officer with whom he allegedly had an affair. Acevedo denied showing the pictures.

=== Austin Police Department ===
Acevedo was hired as chief of the Austin Police Department in 2007. Following the February 8, 2016 shooting death of unarmed 17-year-old David Joseph, Acevedo fired officer Geoffrey Freeman, citing failure to follow policy. Freeman appealed the firing, reaching a settlement in December 2016 that awarded him $35,000 and allowed him to work for other police departments. In April 2016, Acevedo was officially reprimanded and punished by the Austin City Manager for his misconduct following the shooting with the potential to lose his job. Older "operation and judgment concerns" from August 2011 were mentioned as well.

During his time in Austin, Acevedo appeared on The Alex Jones Show to discuss policing on multiple occasions.

On January 19, 2024, news broke that Art Acevedo would be returning to Austin to act as "interim city manager over APD", with a salary of US$271,000 / year. Mayor Kirk Watson said Acevedo "would help to strengthen the relationship between City Hall and the police as well as with the community".

The following day, Travis County DA Jose Garza and others raised strong objections to hiring Acevedo for the newly created city position. Garza said Acevedo's "return is a step backwards for survivors of sexual assault." His remarks were made at an event honoring sexual assault survivors, some of whom had sued the city for failing to properly investigate sexual assaults during Acevedo's tenure as Austin Police Chief. News of his return "clearly irked" half of City Council members and "stunned" the sexual assault survivors.

On January 23 Acevedo wrote on social media that he would no longer be taking the job, saying the new job had become a distraction.

=== Houston Police Department ===
In November 2016, Acevedo was hired as police chief for the Houston Police Department (HPD), filling a vacancy created by the retirement of Charles McClelland. Acevedo is the first person of Hispanic descent to lead the department.

Shortly after the indictment of Michael Bennett for shoving a security guard at Super Bowl LI, Acevedo gave a press conference where he called Bennett "morally corrupt." Charges against Bennett were dropped in 2019.

In January 2019, HPD officers conducted the Harding Street raid, a no-knock raid that resulted in the deaths of two homeowners (Regina Nicholas and Dennis Tuttle) and injury of five officers. The basis for the raid, that the couple were heroin dealers, later turned out to be false. Acevedo initially refused to release an audit of the Narcotics Division, which had revealed widespread problems in the division. The scandal was described by Houston Chronicle reporters as "one of the worst to hit HPD in years." The veteran HPD officer, Gerald Goines, who led the raid based on false information, was initially praised by Acevedo for his courage despite a decades-long history of allegations of misconduct. In June 2020, Nicholas’ brother, John, penned a Houston Chronicle editorial titled, “What about Harding Street raid? Acevedo, Turner give soundbites on police brutality but stay silent about my sister’s death.” John Nicholas and Tuttle family sued the City of Houston the following year. In January 2024, Acevedo said he'd been served with a subpoena to testify in the federal lawsuit and that he was "looking forward to providing testimony".

Acevedo received national attention for his public statements in support of meaningful reform in the wake of the murder of George Floyd, paired with significant criticisms for a lack of action locally to reduce police violence and increase transparency. In the six weeks leading up to George Floyd's murder, HPD officers shot and killed six people. Despite widespread calls from citizens and local politicians to release body-worn camera footage, Acevedo refused, prompting calls for stronger police oversight in Houston.

During the COVID-19 pandemic, murders rose significantly in Houston, as in many other cities. A Houston Chronicle investigation and internal audit found that by 2019, HPD's rate of solving homicides lagged far behind those of many other major cities as well as the department's own clearance rates before Acevedo's tenure.

Acevedo was a vocal critic of local bail reform efforts, claiming that misdemeanor bail reform was a factor in rising violent crime, a claim that was contested by local politicians and criminal justice experts.

=== Miami Police Department ===
In March 2021, Acevedo announced that he would leave the HPD to become chief of police of the Miami Police Department. Francis Suarez, the mayor of Miami, compared the hiring to "getting the Tom Brady or the Michael Jordan of police chiefs." Acevedo was sworn into the position in Miami on April 5, 2021. In June 2021, Acevedo posed for a photo with Gabriel Garcia, a leader within the extremist right-wing group the Proud Boys. Acevedo claimed he wasn't aware of Garcia's background when he posed for the picture.

Acevedo said that he went to reform policing in Miami, and referred to a "Cuban mafia" that controlled the city, which ignited a feud with the Miami City Commission. On October 12, 2021, Acevedo was suspended by City Manager Art Noriega. "Relationships between employers and employees come down to fit and leadership style and unfortunately, Chief Acevedo is not the right fit for this organization," Noriega elaborated. He was fired on October 14, 2021.

=== Aurora Police Department ===
On November 15, 2022, the city of Aurora, Colorado announced that they would appoint Acevedo as interim chief of the Aurora Police Department. On January 19, 2024, Acevedo announced his resignation as Acting Police Chief, effecting January 22.

== Political views ==
In January 2020, Acevedo described himself as a registered Republican during his time in California, but a "lifelong RINO," or "Republican In Name Only," usually a pejorative reference to iconoclastic or otherwise non-conservative views. In the same interview, he addressed his outspokenness on gun violence and reiterated his support for the Violence Against Women Act and openness to decriminalization of some drugs.

During the wake of the murder of George Floyd, Acevedo acknowledged that policing in the United States has had a "disparate treatment and impact on disenfranchised communities — especially communities of color and poor communities," but resisted calls to defund the police. During the subsequent protests in Houston, Acevedo was seen in a video telling protesters "pay close attention because these little white guys with their skateboards are the ones who are starting all the shit." He later doubled down on those comments during a news conference, saying, "We’re seeing that there are people, who are not people of color, who are coming into this city and other cities to actually start agitating and actually engaging in violence." The President of the Houston Fraternal Order of Police criticized the remark, and local news outlet KPRC claimed to fail to substantiate Acevedo's claims noting that the group of arrested people was racially diverse and from the Houston area.

Acevedo appeared in a video shown on the opening night of the 2020 Democratic National Convention, which also featured Democratic presidential nominee Joe Biden, activist Jamira Burley, activist Gwen Carr, NAACP President Derrick Johnson, and Chicago Mayor Lori Lightfoot.

== See also ==
- George Gascón, Cuban-born American Police Chief then District Attorney
- Cuban migration to Miami
- Hispanics and Latinos in Houston
