= Lori Lightfoot =

Mayor of Chicago from 2019 to 2023

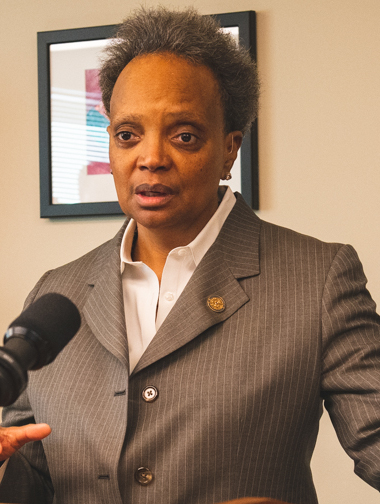
- Lightfoot in 2023

56th Mayor of Chicago
- In office May 20, 2019 – May 15, 2023
- Deputy: Tom Tunney
- Preceded by: Rahm Emanuel
- Succeeded by: Brandon Johnson

President of the Chicago Police Board
- In office July 29, 2015 – May 7, 2018
- Appointed by: Rahm Emanuel
- Preceded by: Demetrius Carney
- Succeeded by: Ghian Foreman

Personal details
- Born: Lori Elaine Lightfoot; August 4, 1962 (age 64) Massillon, Ohio, U.S.
- Party: Democratic
- Spouse: Amy Eshleman (m. 2014)
- Children: 1
- Education: University of Michigan (BA); University of Chicago (JD)
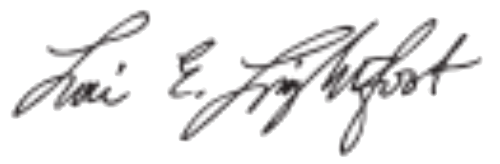
- Signature

Lori Elaine Lightfoot (born August 4, 1962) is an American politician and attorney who was the 56th mayor of Chicago from 2019 until 2023. A member of the Democratic Party, she was the first Black woman and first LGBTQ person to serve as mayor of Chicago. Lightfoot was the second woman (after Jane Byrne) and the third Black person overall to hold the office. (Note: Lightfoot is the second black person to be elected mayor of Chicago, but the third black person to serve as mayor of Chicago. Eugene Sawyer served a partial term as an unelected mayor from 1987 to 1989 following the death of Harold Washington; Sawyer was appointed to the post by the Chicago City Council.) She was also the second openly lesbian woman to serve as mayor of one of the 10 most populous cities in the United States.

After graduating from the University of Chicago Law School, Lightfoot first worked as an attorney for the Northern District of Illinois and, later, as a partner at the law firm Mayer Brown. She also held positions in Chicago government prior to serving as mayor. Appointed by Mayor Rahm Emanuel, Lightfoot was the president of the Chicago Police Board and chair of the Chicago Police Accountability Task Force. In these roles, she was tasked with helping oversee misconduct cases in the Chicago Police Department.

Lightfoot ran successfully for mayor of Chicago in 2019. Advancing to the runoff, she defeated Toni Preckwinkle easily, winning in all 50 of the city's wards. As mayor, Lightfoot increased Chicago's minimum wage, worked to build affordable housing, and sought to revitalize blighted areas of the city. However, her tenure was also marked by controversy and low public approval. She notably faced criticism over Chicago's rising crime rates, vaccine mandates and overall handling of the COVID-19 pandemic. Lightfoot ran for reelection in 2023, but failed to qualify for the runoff. She became the first Chicago mayor to lose reelection in 40 years.

== Early life and education ==
Lightfoot was born in Massillon, Ohio, the youngest of four children. Her mother, Ann Lightfoot, was a nighttime healthcare aide and school board member, and her father, Elijah Lightfoot, was a local factory worker and janitor. She grew up in a primarily white neighborhood on the west side of the city.

Lightfoot is a graduate of Washington High School in Massillon, where she was a trumpet player in the school band; sang alto in the choir; played basketball, volleyball, and softball; edited the yearbook; and was a member of the Pep Club. She was elected high school class president three times. When she ran for high school class president, Lightfoot's campaign slogan was "Get on the right foot with Lightfoot". In recounting the start of her interest in political organizing, she has often mentioned a high school boycott she organized protesting the quality of school lunches.

Lightfoot received her Bachelor of Arts in political science from the University of Michigan in 1984, graduating with honors. She pursued seven different types of employment to pay for her education, including working as a resident assistant and as a cook for the school's football team. She also held factory jobs at home during summers to help pay for her education. While Lightfoot was an undergraduate, her older brother, Brian Lightfoot, was arrested in connection with a bank robbery and the shooting of a security guard.

Lightfoot held positions working for Congress members Ralph Regula and Barbara Mikulski before deciding to attend law school. She has said she chose to attend law school not because of her brother's legal troubles, but because she wanted a job that offered financial independence. She matriculated at the University of Chicago Law School, where she was awarded a full scholarship. As president of the University of Chicago Law School's student body, she led a successful movement to ban a law firm from campus after the firm sent a recruiter who made racist and sexist remarks towards a student. Lightfoot quarterbacked an intramural flag football team while at Chicago Law School. Lightfoot also served as a clerk for Justice Charles Levin of the Michigan Supreme Court. She graduated from the University of Chicago with her J.D. degree in 1989.

== Career ==
=== Assistant U.S. Attorney (1996–2002) ===
After law school, Lightfoot became a practicing attorney at the Mayer Brown law firm, serving a wide cross-section of clients. Lightfoot first entered the public sector as Assistant United States Attorney for the Northern District of Illinois. During her mayoral campaign, Lightfoot cited several reasons for entering public service, including a desire to represent the African-American community, a sense of injustice based on the murder of a family member by a Ku Klux Klan member in the 1920s, and struggles with the law encountered by her older brother, who was charged with possession of crack cocaine with intent to distribute.

While working as a federal prosecutor, Lightfoot helped to prosecute those accused of federal crimes, including drug crimes. She assisted with Operation Silver Shovel, an FBI investigation into Chicago corruption. She helped to convict alderman Virgil Jones. In 1999, Lightfoot was issued a warning for misconduct by judge Richard Posner in a case in which she was found by the United States Court of Appeals for the Seventh Circuit to have misled a United States Circuit Judge regarding a suspect's whereabouts, making it impossible for the judge to stay the suspect's extradition to Norway. Lightfoot and the Justice Department disputed this characterization of her actions.

=== Chicago Police Department Office of Professional Standards (2002–04) ===
In 2002, Lightfoot was appointed chief administrator of the Chicago Police Department Office of Professional Standards, a now-defunct governmental police oversight group, by Police Superintendent Terry Hillard. She held the position for two years. In the position, she was in charge of investigating possible cases of police misconduct, including police shootings of civilians. However, a Chicago Tribune report found that the Office of Professional Standards' investigations often lacked thoroughness. Lightfoot says her recommendations for disciplinary action were often rejected by the police department.

In one notable case, Lightfoot went against Police Department orthodoxy by recommending the firing of officer Alvin Weems, who shot and killed an unarmed man, Michael Pleasance. Weems was initially believed to have accidentally shot Pleasance, but after video evidence contradicting the initial claims was revealed, even Weems himself expressed the view that the shooting was unjustified. Weems was not fired by the Chicago Police Department, but the city was eventually forced to pay a settlement to the Pleasance family. Weems later committed suicide.

In another controversial case where officer Phyllis Clinkscales shot and killed unarmed 17-year-old Robert Washington, the Chicago Tribune reported that Lightfoot determined that the shooting was justified. In doing so, the Tribune said she reversed the order of her predecessor, who had called for Clinkscales's firing. Clinkscales's account of the events of the shooting had been found to contain untrue statements in an investigation. Lightfoot disputes this account of Clinkscales's case, saying that the police superintendent at the time was responsible for declining Lightfoot's predecessor's finding that the shooting was unjustified. Lightfoot said her action on the case was to push for a 30-day suspension for Clinkscales, which she implied was the most that was possible given the circumstances.

=== Other roles in Chicago city government (2004–05) ===
Lightfoot then moved on to work in the Chicago Office of Emergency Management and Communications. She was later hired by Mayor Richard M. Daley as deputy chief of the Chicago Department of Procurement Services. There, she and her boss, Mary Dempsey, investigated Chicago corruption, drawing Mayor Daley's ire in the process. Lightfoot and Dempsey's investigations included probes of then-Governor of Illinois Rod Blagojevich's associate Tony Rezko and prominent Daley donor Elzie Higginbottom. Lightfoot worked at the Department of Procurement Services for a few months, subsequently returning to Mayer Brown. Lightfoot has suggested that she left the Department of Procurement Services because of dismay at corruption in City Hall.

=== Private practice ===
As an attorney at Mayer Brown, Lightfoot represented Republicans in two cases contesting supposed Democratic gerrymandering. At Mayer Brown, she also defended Chicago police officer Paul Powers against charges of physical assault. In 2019, after facing criticism over defending Powers, Lightfoot cited video evidence in favor of her former client's innocence.

Lightfoot was briefly hired by the city of Chicago to defend the city against charges brought by the family of a mentally ill woman, Christina Eilman, who was taken into custody by Chicago police after suffering a mental breakdown at Midway Airport. Eilman suffered sexual assault and a seven-story fall after being released by police into the dangerous Englewood neighborhood. Eilman's family reached a $22.5 million settlement with the city.

Lightfoot has also served on the boards of the Illinois chapters of NARAL and the ACLU. She has served as external counsel for Bank of America. In 2013, Lightfoot was a finalist for the position of U.S. Attorney for the Northern District of Illinois, but the job went to Zachary T. Fardon.

=== Chicago Police Board and Task Force (2015–18) ===
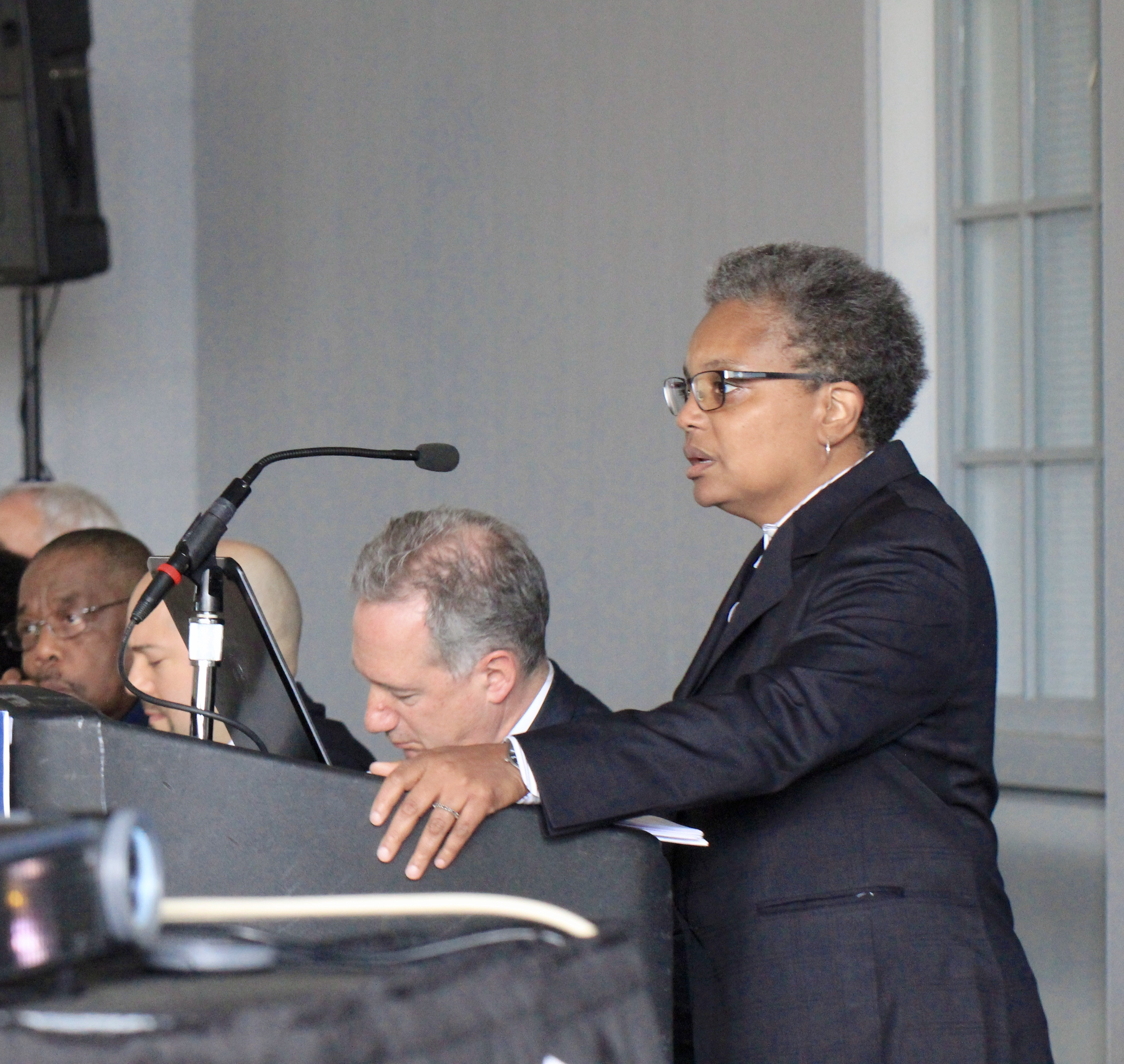
Lightfoot speaking at the release of the Chicago Police Accountability Task Force's report in 2016

Lightfoot returned to the public sector in 2015, when Mayor Rahm Emanuel appointed her to replace 19-year incumbent Demetrius Carney as president of the Chicago Police Board. The board's main responsibility is to make recommendations for or against disciplinary action on certain disputed cases of police misconduct. Under Lightfoot's leadership, the board became more punitive, firing officers in 72% of its cases. In the wake of the controversy over the murder of Laquan McDonald, Emanuel also appointed Lightfoot as chair of a special Police Accountability Task Force. In 2016, the Task Force, led by Lightfoot, filed a report critical of the Chicago Police Department's practices. She specifically criticized the police union's "code of silence". The anti-police brutality activist organization Black Youth Project 100's Chicago chapter released a statement denouncing Lightfoot, the board and task force for a "lack of accountability".

In 2017, Emanuel re-appointed Lightfoot to a second term as president of the Police Board. The decision came after Lightfoot and Emanuel had publicly come into conflict, particularly over Emanuel's attempts to reach a police reform deal with Trump Administration Justice Department officials that would avoid a consent decree and oversight from a federal judge. Lightfoot called Emanuel's approach "fundamentally flawed". At the time, there was already speculation that Lightfoot was planning a run for mayor of Chicago in 2019, though she denied the rumors. Lightfoot resigned from the Police Board in May 2018, just before announcing her mayoral campaign.

== 2019 mayoral campaign ==
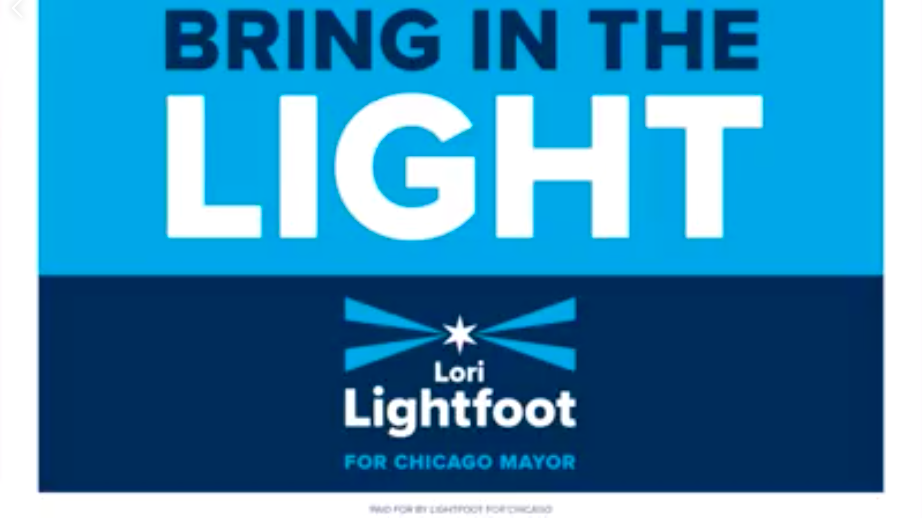
One of Lightfoot's mayoral campaign signs, featuring her slogan "Bring in the Light"

On May 10, 2018, Lightfoot announced her candidacy for mayor of Chicago in the 2019 elections, her first-ever run for public office. Lightfoot is the first openly lesbian candidate in the history of Chicago mayoral elections.

By summer 2018, Lightfoot had the highest-funded campaign of any individual challenging the two-term incumbent mayor, Rahm Emanuel. In the fall, Emanuel dropped out of the race. High-profile candidates such as Gery Chico, William M. Daley, Susana Mendoza, and Toni Preckwinkle then entered the race.

In December, after Lightfoot submitted the petitions necessary to secure a place on the ballot, Preckwinkle's campaign filed a challenge claiming that many of Lightfoot's petitions were fraudulent. The Chicago Board of Elections Commissioners found Lightfoot had enough valid petitions to remain on the ballot, and Preckwinkle's campaign withdrew its challenge. In January, the race was upended by a major corruption scandal involving Chicago alderman Ed Burke. Lightfoot ran a television advertisement criticizing Chico, Daley, Mendoza and Preckwinkle as the "Burke Four" for their connections to the disgraced alderman.

Lightfoot picked up several endorsements, including nods from LGBTQ groups and local politicians. In February, Lightfoot won the endorsement of the Chicago Sun-Times editorial board. As close to the election as late January, Lightfoot's support ranged between 2% and 5% in polls. She surged in polls later in the race, consistently polling at or near double-digits in surveys released in the weeks leading up to the election.

In what was considered to be an upset, Lightfoot finished first in the February election. She placed first in a crowded field of fourteen candidates. Because no candidate reached the necessary 50% of the vote needed to win the election outright, she and Preckwinkle advanced to a runoff election.

In the runoff, both the Sun-Times and the Chicago Tribune endorsed Lightfoot. Several former candidates, including Mendoza, Chico, Paul Vallas, and fourth-place finisher Willie Wilson also endorsed Lightfoot in the runoff. Lightfoot held a substantial lead over Preckwinkle in polls conducted during the runoff campaign.

During the runoff, Lightfoot faced criticism from criminal justice activists over her record in police accountability and as a prosecutor. Lightfoot defended herself against Bennett's criticisms at a mayoral debate, citing her personal experiences with racial discrimination as evidence she would take the concerns of the black community into account. Lightfoot also faced activist criticism over comments at a University of Chicago forum where she suggested turning some shuttered schools in the city into police academies. Lightfoot later disavowed this suggestion via Twitter.

In the runoff, Lightfoot received endorsements from seven of the twelve candidates that had been eliminated in the first round. Preckwinkle, by contrast, received no endorsements at all from any candidates that had been eliminated in the first round.

Lightfoot won the runoff election on April 2, 2019, becoming mayor-elect of Chicago. She won more than 73% of the overall vote in the runoff, winning in all 50 wards of the city. Lightfoot won all but 20 of the city's 2,069 voting precincts. Voter turnout was 32.89%, almost a record low.

Chart of progression of Lightfoot's poll numbers in first round

== Mayor of Chicago ==
Lightfoot's administration faced criticism due to rising crime rates in Chicago and accusations of covering up police misconduct. During her term, she clashed with members of the Chicago City Council, the Chicago Teachers Union, and Illinois governor J. B. Pritzker's administration. The New York Times remarked that she had an "uncanny ability to make political enemies." However, Lightfoot received praise for her efforts to build affordable housing, repair dilapidated areas of the city, and raise the minimum wage.

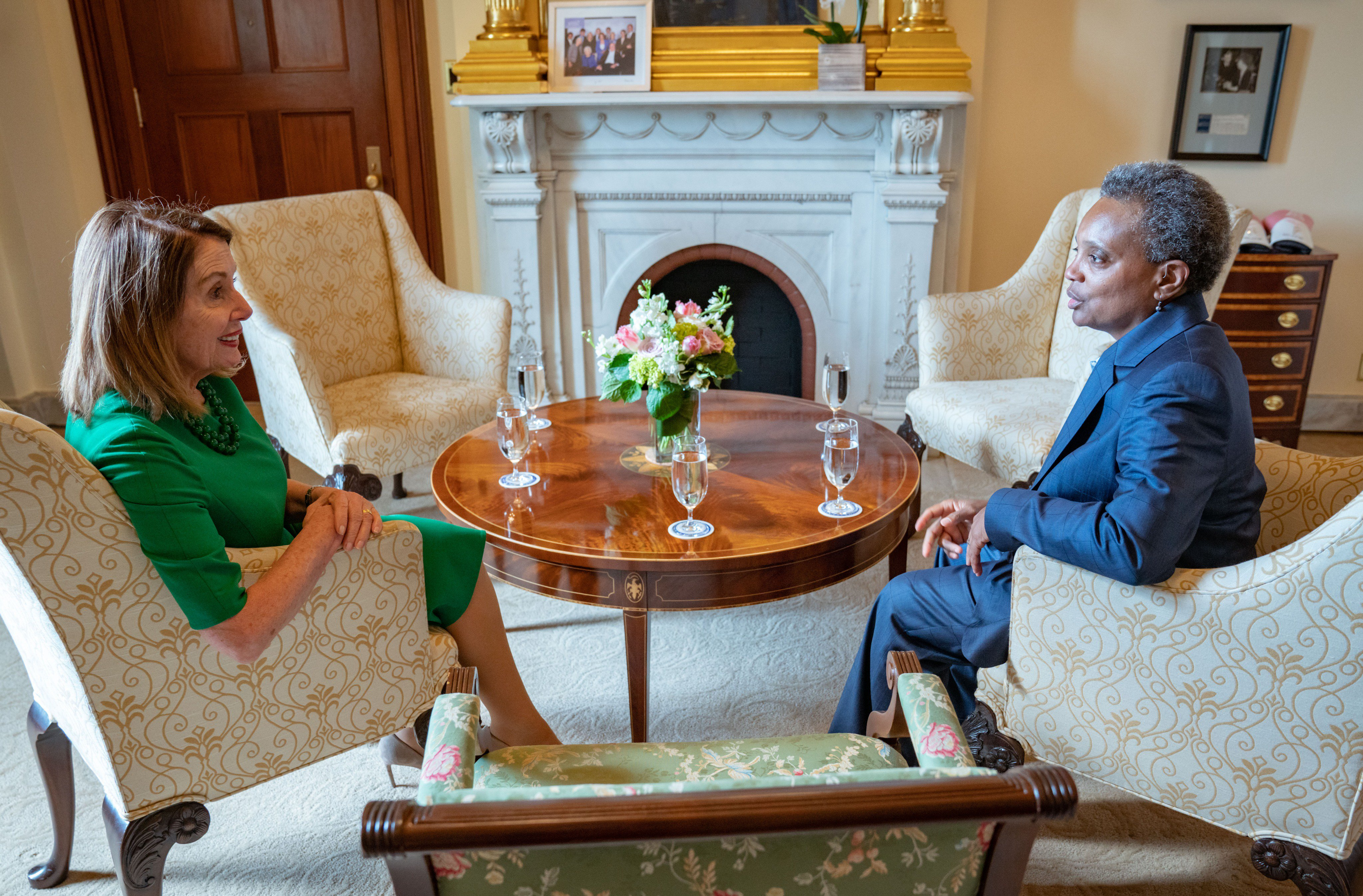
Mayor-elect Lightfoot meeting with Speaker of the United States House of Representatives Nancy Pelosi on May 7, 2019

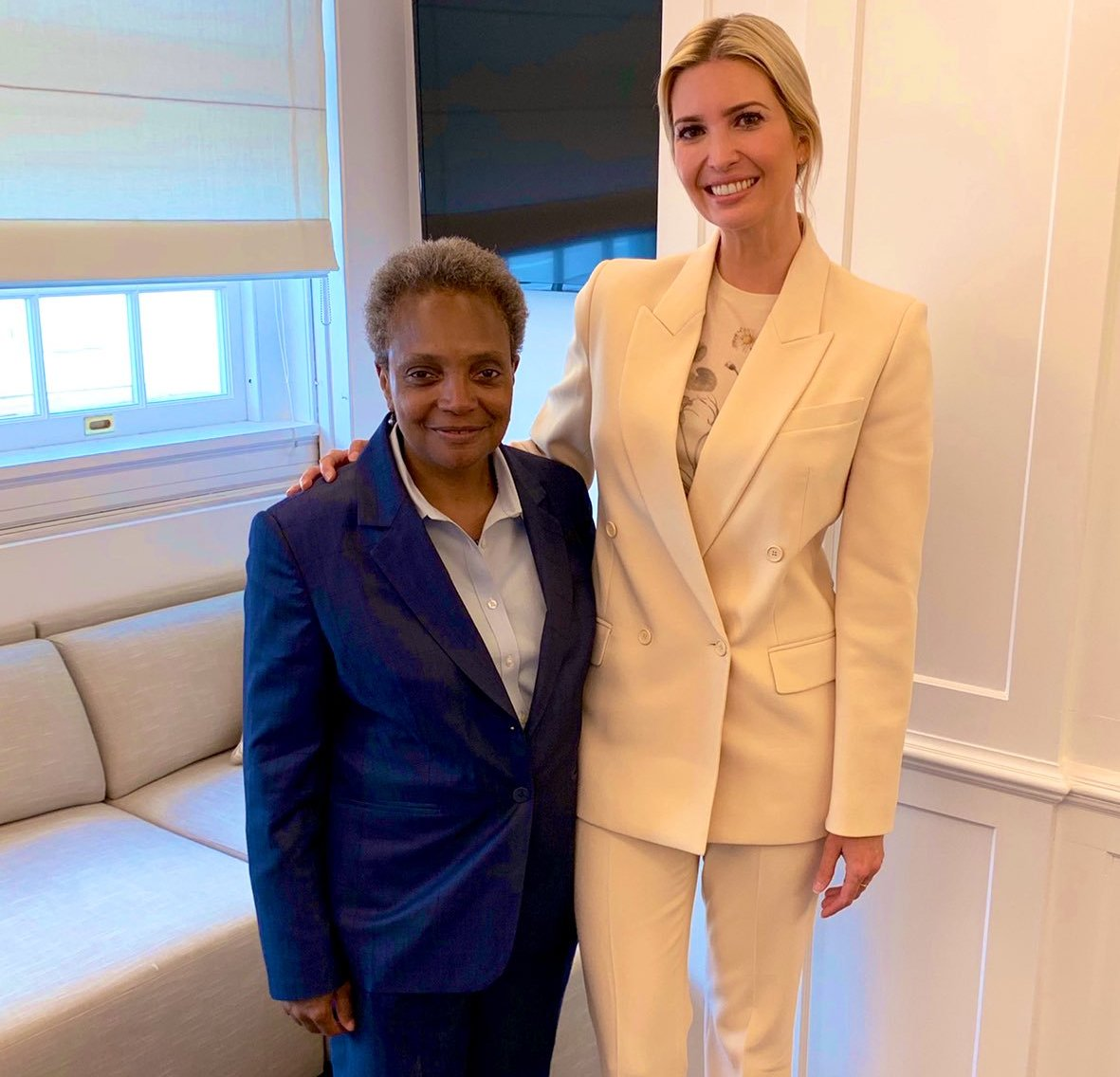
Mayor-elect Lightfoot meeting with Ivanka Trump, Daughter of then-President of the United States Donald Trump, on May 7, 2019

=== Transition ===
As mayor-elect, Lightfoot expressed a desire for the Laquan McDonald trial to be reexamined, urging the U.S. Attorney's Office to reopen its grand jury investigation to examine if any civil rights were violated.

On April 6, 2019, Lightfoot told the Chicago Sun-Times that her staff would, during her first post-election weekend, spend time examining the city's 600-page agreement with Sterling Bay regarding the Lincoln Yards development. During her campaign, Lightfoot had been critical of the process that was being taken to reach the agreement. The following Monday, at her request, Mayor Rahm Emanuel postponed city council votes on the approval of $1.6 billion in tax increment financing subsidies for both the Lincoln Yards and The 78 mega-developments. After the developers of the two projects agreed to increase commitments to hiring minority-owned and women-owned contractors, Lightfoot announced her support for the projects, which were approved one day subsequent to her declaration of support.

=== Inauguration ===
On May 20, 2019, Lightfoot officially took office as mayor of Chicago after being sworn in at 11:15 am by Magistrate Judge Susan E. Cox of the U.S. District Court for the Northern District of Illinois at the Wintrust Arena, accompanied by her wife and daughter. Upon taking office, Lightfoot became the first openly LGBT Chicago mayor, the first black female Chicago mayor, as well as the second female Chicago mayor (after Jane Byrne) and third Chicago black mayor (after Harold Washington and Eugene Sawyer).

=== Affordable housing ===
On October 14, 2019, Lightfoot announced the creation of an affordable housing task force set to consist of 20 members and study solutions to housing affordability over a 4- to 6-month period. The following month, it was announced that the task force would also come up with a proposal to rewrite the city's affordable housing ordinance. These efforts directly implicated systemic racism as the primary issue in housing affordability, recommending an entirely new framework for housing ordinances prioritizing racial equity. However, initial affordable housing goals were set back by budget shortfalls due to the COVID-19 pandemic. Many of these recommendations were eventually integrated into the distribution of federal relief funds for housing assistance grants, as well as allocations for low-income tax credits.

On March 6, 2020, Lightfoot named Tracey Scott as CEO of the Chicago Housing Authority. On March 30, the CHA Board of Commissioners approved Tracey Scott's appointment.

=== Casino ===
After legislation expanding gambling in Illinois was passed by the state legislature at the start of June 2019, Lightfoot announced that the city would commence a study of where a Chicago casino would be located. Lightfoot's predecessors had long sought to obtain a casino for the city. While the state did not approve a city-owned casino (reportedly preferred by Lightfoot, as it had been by her predecessors), state legislation allowed for a privately owned casino from which the city would receive one-third of tax revenue generated. Lightfoot continued to push, however, for the state to authorize a casino jointly owned by the city and state and with a lesser effective tax rate than the passed legislation specified.

On May 5, 2022, Lightfoot announced that she had selected a bid from the Bally's Corporation to construct a casino resort on the west bank of the Chicago River.

=== Christopher Columbus statue ===
In July 2020, Lightfoot directed that a statue of Christopher Columbus be removed from Grant Park. After the murder of George Floyd, protesters had attempted to knock over the statue and had engaged in a violent confrontation with police.

In March 2022, attorney George Smyrniotis sued Lightfoot for defamation. The lawsuit claimed that Italian Americans were unhappy with the removal of the Columbus statue, and that a tentative deal had been struck to assuage their concerns by allowing the statue to be displayed in an annual Columbus Day parade. According to Smyrniotis, Lightfoot—angry over the proposal regarding the display of the statue—suggested during a Zoom call that she would revoke the parade permit if the statue were to be displayed. Smyrniotis added that Lightfoot had questioned his competence, berated him and others with obscenities, and asserted that she had "'the biggest dick in Chicago'". For her part, Lightfoot contended that the lawsuit's "'deeply offensive and ridiculous claims'" were "'wholly lacking in merit'".

=== City Council ===
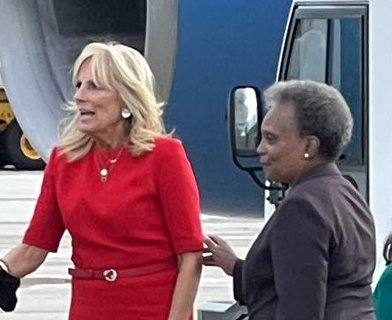
Lightfoot with First Lady Jill Biden in 2022

Lightfoot's first executive order as mayor limited "aldermanic prerogative", a practice under which Chicago aldermen were granted an effective veto over matters in their wards.

On May 28, 2019, Lightfoot unveiled proposals to revise the Chicago City Council operating rules. Among other things, she proposed live streaming video of committee meetings, changes to strengthen the rule on conflicts of interest, and the transfer of control over TIF subsidies to the council's Committee on Economic and Capital Development.

On May 31, 2019, after indictments were brought against Alderman Edward M. Burke, Lightfoot called for his resignation.

On June 5, 2019, Lightfoot outlined further ethics reform proposals for the city council.

=== COVID-19 pandemic ===
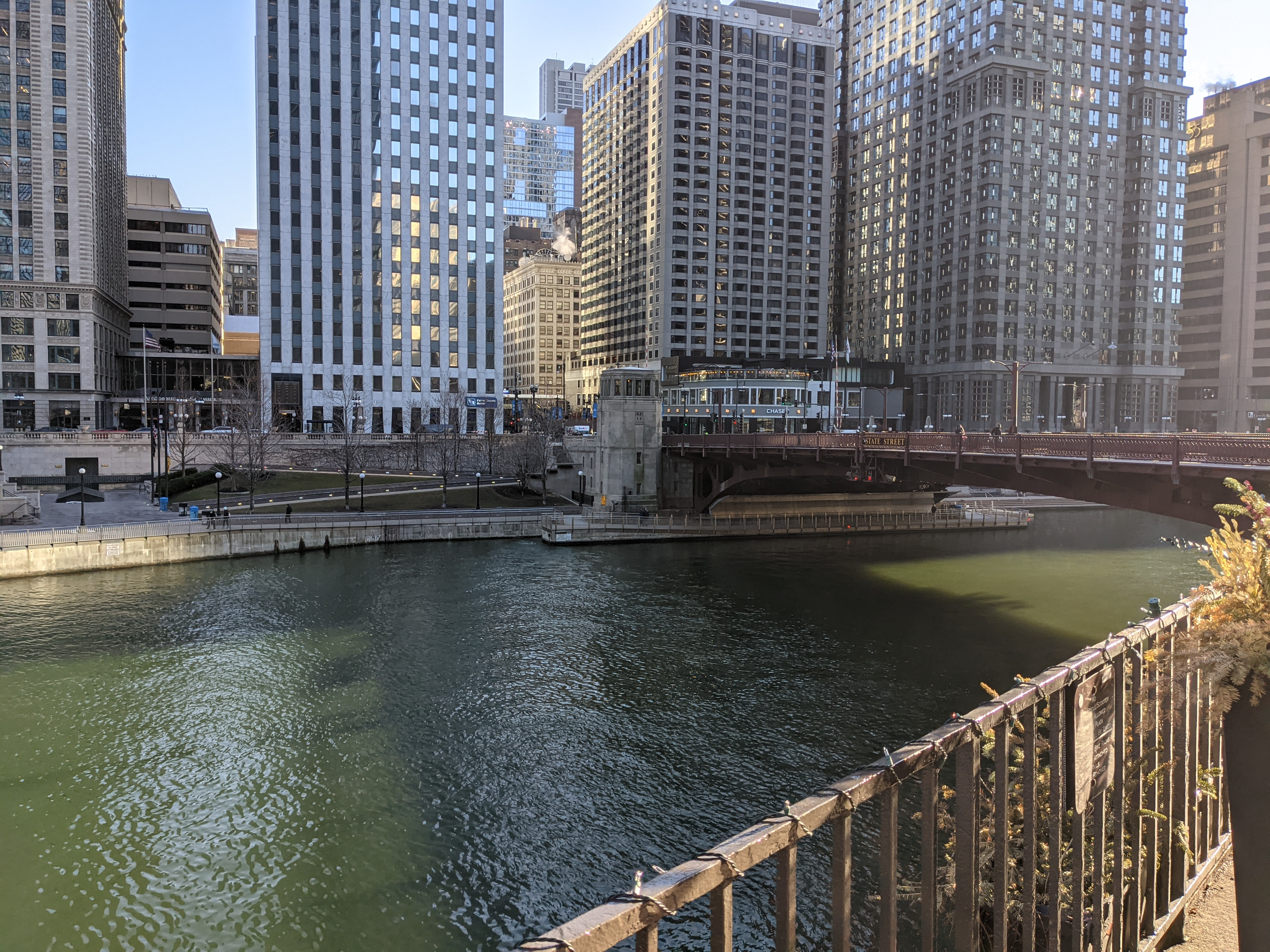
Chicago River dyed green for St. Patrick's Day 2021

During the COVID-19 pandemic in the United States, Lightfoot took a number of actions aimed at quelling the severity of the outbreak in Chicago. On March 11, 2020, Lightfoot joined Illinois Governor J. B. Pritzker to postpone the city's formal Saint Patrick's Day festivities (including parades and the dyeing of the Chicago River). On March 15, Lightfoot decided that, due to concerns surrounding Saint Patrick's Day festivities, all businesses selling liquor must have less than half of their regular maximum capacity, and must additionally not exceed a capacity of 100 people.

On March 12, 2020, Lightfoot again joined Pritzker to issue, among other things, a ban on events attended by more than 1,000 people over the next 30 days.

On March 15, Lightfoot criticized the long lines at Chicago's O'Hare International Airport as "utterly unacceptable", citing federal government travel restrictions related to the coronavirus pandemic. Under the federal government's travel restrictions, authorized passengers could only take flights from 26 permitted European nations to a total of thirteen permitted United States airports, of which O'Hare was one.

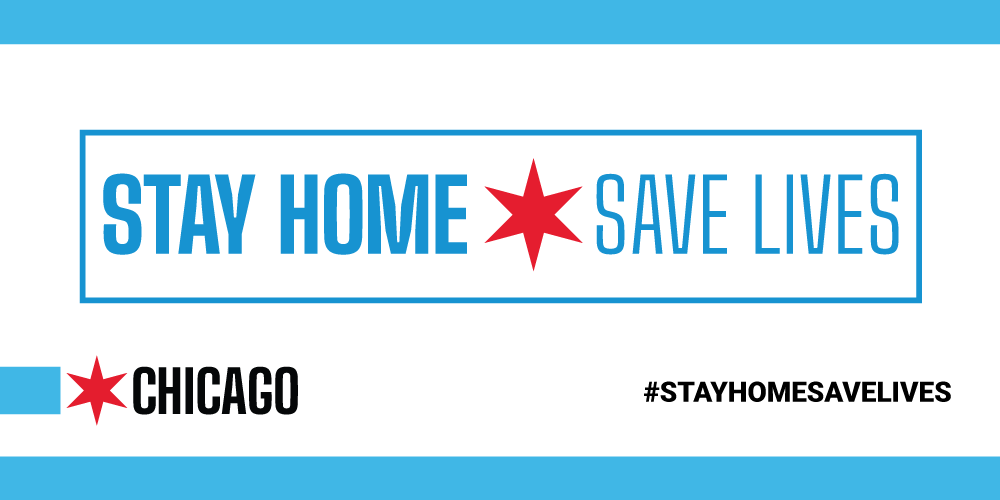
Under Lightfoot, Chicago launched a campaign urging residents to follow Illinois' stay-at-home order.

Lightfoot's administration supplemented the state response with municipal public health measures, and the mayor leveraged the visibility of her office to promote adherence. On March 20, 2020, Lightfoot extended Chicago Public School closures beyond the Illinois state mandate. Chicago's Department of Health Commissioner, Dr. Allison Arwady, signed a public health order prohibiting residents diagnosed with or exhibiting symptoms of COVID-19 from leaving their place of residence for work or other public gatherings. The order made exceptions for sick residents seeking essential services, such as clinical care, medicine, and food. Lightfoot declared that those found to be in violation of this order could be issued a citation. On March 27, Lightfoot also placed a ban on contact sports and closed the city's parks, beaches, and trails due to recent instances of residents gathering in public places in breach of the state's stay-at-home order. On April 8, Lightfoot introduced a curfew on liquor sales in an attempt to curb crowds congregating outside liquor stores. Lightfoot even directly participated in the enforcement of the state's stay-at-home order, personally patrolling the city and confronting violators. This no-nonsense approach to enforcing COVID-19 restrictions inspired a series of Lightfoot-centric internet memes that first gained popularity in late March.

Lightfoot also endorsed proactive public health measures. On March 31, 2020, Lightfoot announced that she had secured 300 hotel rooms in the city's downtown to house first responders, which they could use so that they would not need to go to their homes and risk spreading COVID-19 to their families, and her administration worked with the United States Army Corps of Engineers to establish a makeshift hospital at McCormick Place. On April 7, Lightfoot signed an executive order affirming the eligibility of undocumented immigrants for city benefits and services, including COVID-19 relief, although such protections were already guaranteed under the Welcoming City Ordinance passed under the previous administration. Lightfoot also partnered with Chicago's professional sports teams to launch the "We Are Not Playing" advertisement campaign.

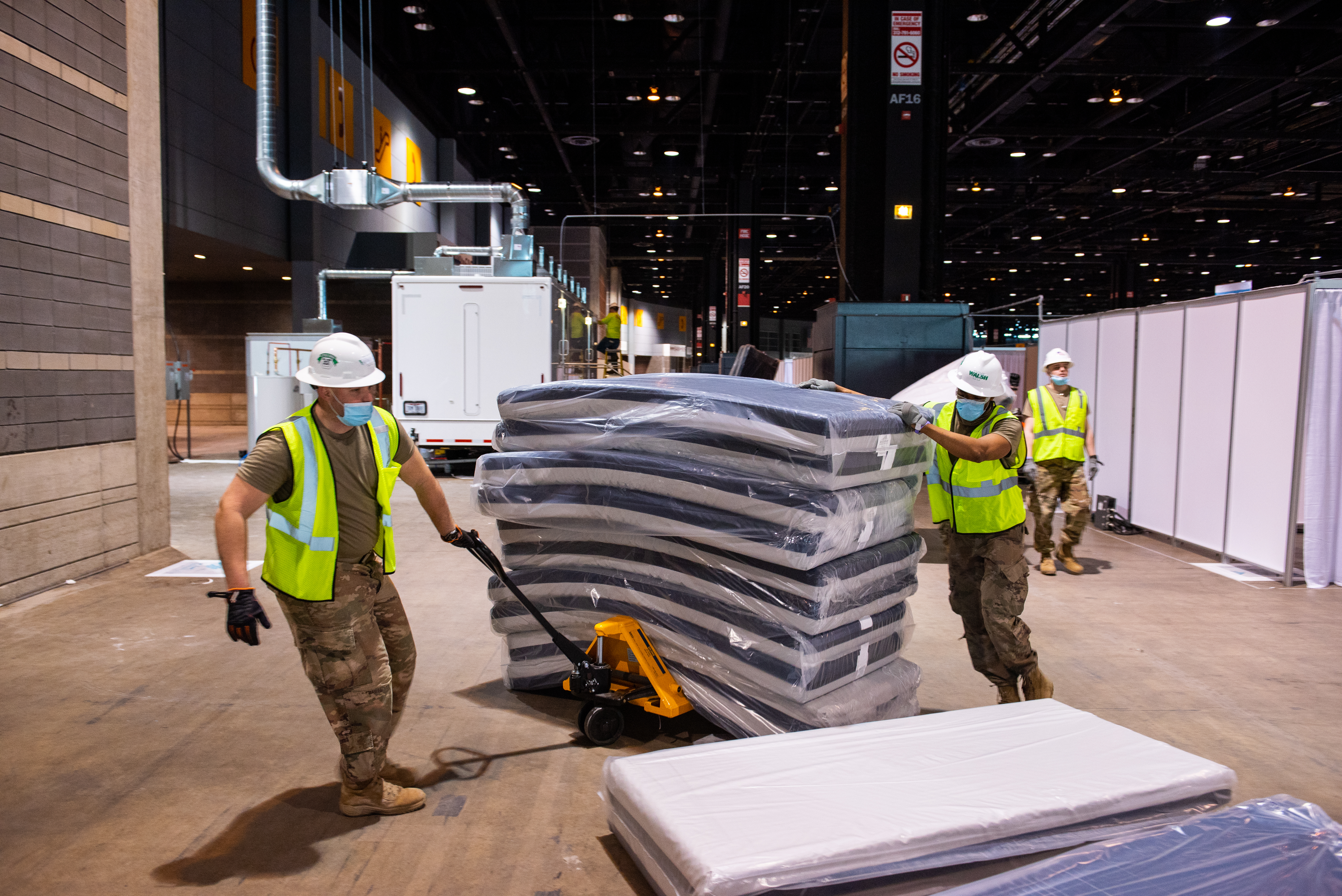
Members of the Illinois Air National Guard work to convert McCormick Place into a makeshift hospital

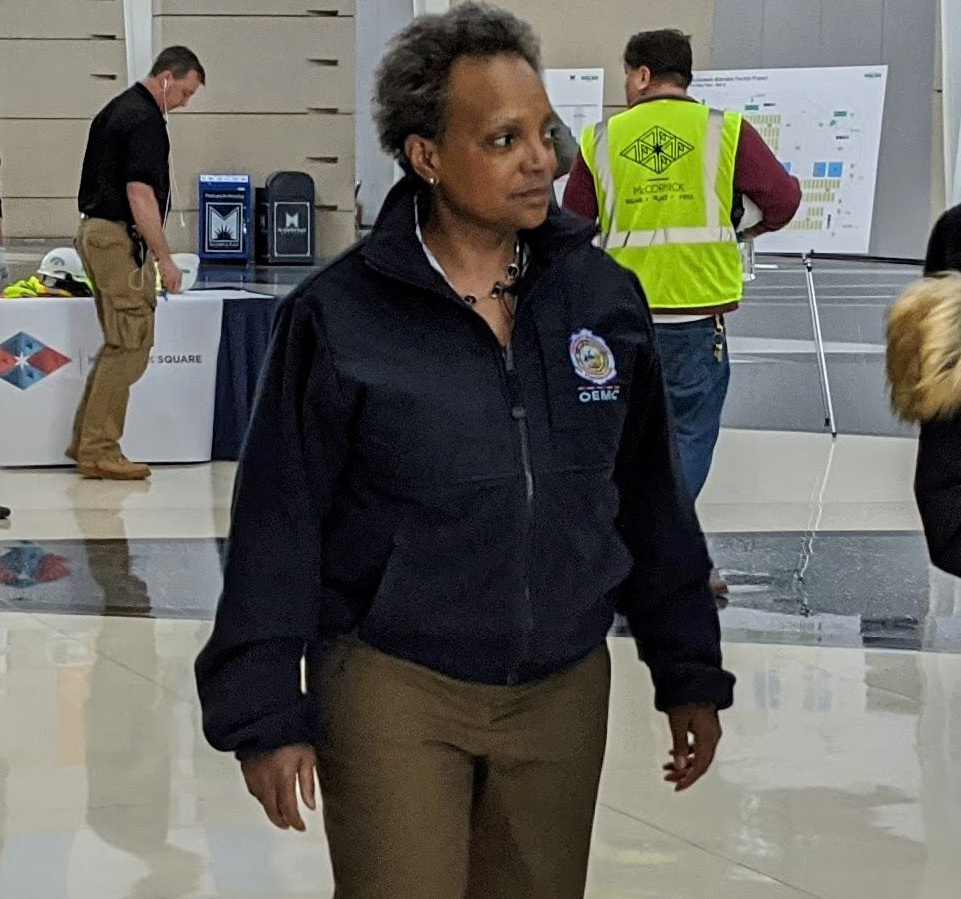
Lightfoot inspects the temporary hospital facility being erected at McCormick Place in April 2020

In early April, Lightfoot began to draw criticism for perceived hypocrisy and opacity in relation to the city's pandemic response. When Lightfoot was found to have gotten her hair cut in violation of the state's stay-at-home order, she argued that she was justified in doing so, saying, "I'm the public face of this city. I'm on national media and I'm out in the public eye." Lightfoot also courted controversy in defending her support for the suspension of Freedom of Information Act response deadlines. The mayor invoked the Old Testament to contend that FOIA requests diverted municipal employees from lifesaving duties: "I'm mindful of the fact that we're in the Pesach season, the angel of death that we all talk about is the Passover story, that angel of death is right here in our midst every single day." In response, the digital-rights group Electronic Frontier Foundation awarded Lightfoot the tongue-in-cheek "Pharaoh Prize for Deadline Extensions." Lightfoot was further scrutinized for her decision to issue new restrictions, including a stay-at-home advisory, on November 12, as she had been seen days earlier at a large gathering celebrating Joe Biden's election victory.

On December 21, 2021, Lightfoot announced the beginning of a vaccine passport for indoor venues in the city of Chicago, while implementing a testing requirement for employees. The mandate applied anyone over the age of 5. Separately city employees were forced to be vaccinated, inciting mass non-compliance from the police department and other city employees. The city sued Chicago's Fraternal Order of Police, alleging John Catanzara of encouraging a legal work stoppage and later dropped its lawsuit. A judge had suspended a December 2022 deadline for the mandate and the Illinois Labor Relations Board twice ruled that the city violated employees collective bargaining rights. Non-police department city employees who were fired were ordered reinstated by an administrative judge in 2023.

=== Education ===
As mayor-elect, Lightfoot opposed state legislation that would create a 21-member school board, calling it "unwieldy". (Lightfoot had previously advocated for an elected Chicago school board.) Nevertheless, in July 2021, governor J. B. Pritzker signed such legislation over Lightfoot's objections.

=== Fiscal issues ===
On November 23, 2019, a plan by Lightfoot to increase the minimum wage to $15 an hour by 2021 was approved by the Chicago City Council. This increase did not include restaurant servers and tipped workers.

In the fall of 2019, Lightfoot proposed a graduated transfer tax for commercial real estate sales. Under this proposal, the city would capture more money from large real estate transfers while also providing a tax break for most transfers valued under $500,000.

On November 26, 2019, the Chicago City Council approved Lightfoot's budget for the 2020 fiscal year.

=== Public safety and police ===
Shortly after taking office, Lightfoot faced what was regarded as her first test at preserving public safety. In prior years, violence had often increased over Memorial Day weekend in Chicago. In an attempt to eschew this pattern, Lightfoot initiated Our City. Our Safety, under which extra police patrols were stationed in busy locations and troubled spots, and free youth programs were organized by the Chicago Park District at about a hundred locations. A notable extent of the violence was still witnessed over the weekend, to which Lightfoot responded, "We can't claim victory and we certainly can't celebrate. We have much more work to do."

On May 28, 2019, Lightfoot outlined a plan to focus on reducing the city's gun violence. On May 28, 2019, Lightfoot urged the city council to pass an ordinance within her first hundred days that would establish a level of civilian oversight on the Chicago Police Department.

Lightfoot launched a community policing initiative in June 2019. Later that month she announced that the city's police department would not assist U.S. Immigration and Customs Enforcement (ICE) raids, denying ICE access to the city's police database in an effort to prevent the city's illegal immigrant population from facing deportation.

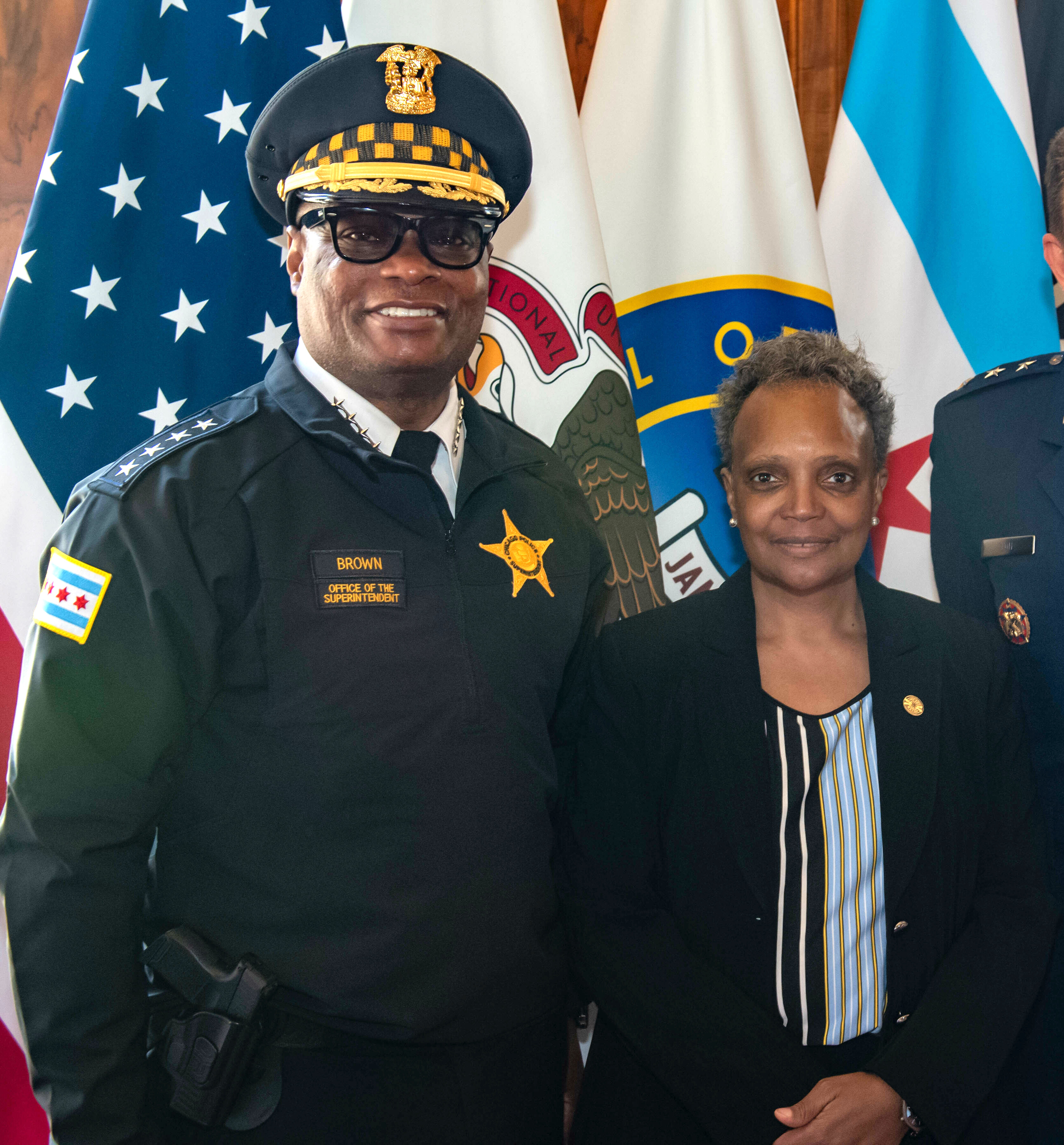
Lightfoot with Police Superintendent David Brown in 2022

On November 8, 2019, after Eddie T. Johnson announced that he would resign from his position as superintendent of the Chicago Police Department, Lightfoot named Charlie Beck to serve as interim superintendent of the Chicago Police Department. On December 2, rather than letting Johnson voluntarily retire, Lightfoot fired him due to what she declared were "intolerable" actions by him and him misleading the public. Lightfoot nominated David Brown to be superintendent of police on April 2, 2020. After Beck stepped down on April 15, Brown became acting superintendent, while pending confirmation to serve on a permanent basis.

On November 13, 2019, Lightfoot proposed an ordinance that would create a new Office of Public Safety Administration, which would combine administrative functions of Chicago Police Department, the Chicago Fire Department and the Office of Public Safety Administration.

In June 2020, Lightfoot voiced her opposition to an ordinance proposed by alderman Roderick Sawyer, which would end the Chicago Public Schools' contract to station Chicago Police Department officers at schools.

In May 2021, Lightfoot nominated Annette Nance-Holt to be the city fire commissioner. She was confirmed to the position by the Chicago City Council on June 23. Nance-Holt is the first woman to serve in a permanent capacity as the commissioner of the Chicago Fire Department.

On June 17, 2021, WBEN reported that Chicago led the nation in mass shootings, averaging approximately one per week. In response to the city's third mass shooting in four days, Lightfoot said: "We are part of a club of cities to which no one wants to belong: cities with mass shootings."

==== 2020 Black Lives Matter police violence protests ====
During the 2020 Black Lives Matter (BLM) anti-police violence protests sparked by the murder of George Floyd, Lightfoot, who campaigned as a police reformer, stated that police unions have continued to be one of the main obstacles to reform of the department:

"Unfortunately, in history in our city, and I think the history of other cities, unions are extraordinarily reluctant to embrace reform and that's a current state of affairs here... We have had to take them to arbitration to win very modest reforms, and that's a shame of the history of collective bargaining where there hasn't been an emphasis on reform and accountability... These contracts... are a significant problem and challenge in getting the reforms necessary."

Lightfoot further stated that police violence and brutality "demean the badge" and asked the public to report police misconduct.

On May 31, during a conference call with all 50 Chicago aldermen, Lightfoot got into a heated argument with fellow Democrat Raymond Lopez of the 15th Ward. The two swore at one another after Lopez criticized the mayor's response to looting and rioting during the George Floyd protests.

In August 2020, she came under criticism for not allowing protests on the block where she lives. Lightfoot said this was justified because she had received threats.

=== Second anniversary as mayor ===
On May 19, 2021, Lightfoot stated she would only choose reporters of color for interviews on the occasion of her second anniversary in office. This sparked considerable backlash, with many calling for her resignation, including Tulsi Gabbard. Judicial Watch sued Lightfoot on behalf of The Daily Caller, alleging that Lightfoot violated journalist Thomas Catenacci's First and Fourteenth Amendment rights.

=== Universal basic income pilot ===
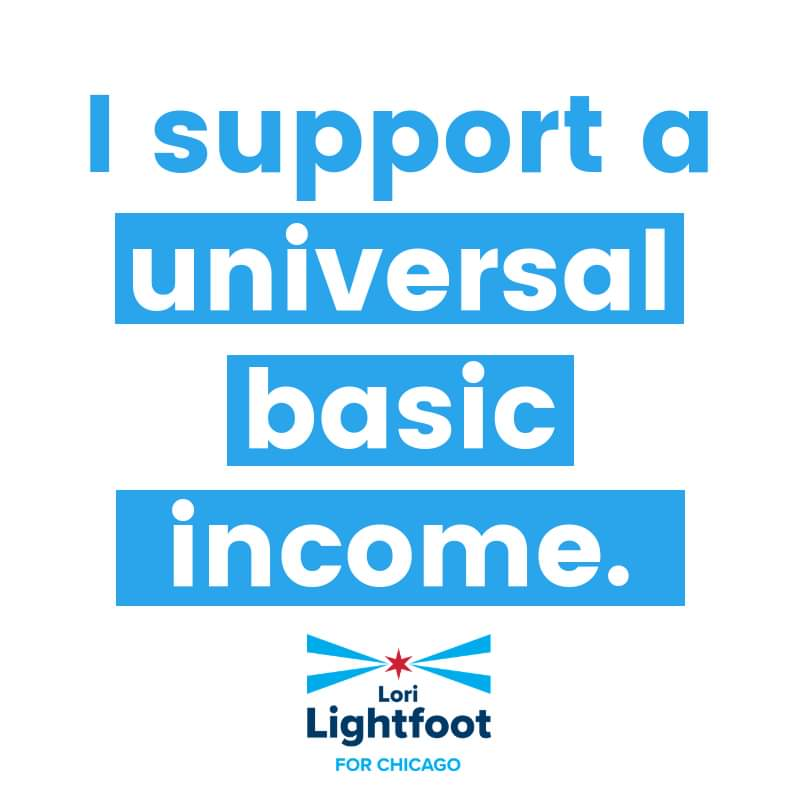
Advertising for Lightfoot's 2019 mayoral campaign

In February 2022, it was announced by Lightfoot that Chicago residents would be able to apply to participate in the city's $500-per-month basic income pilot program in April of that year. The pilot program was offered to Chicago residents who suffered economic hardship due to the COVID-19 pandemic, giving them the chance to enter into a lottery to get $500 monthly payments for the course of one year. The pilot program was for 5,000 participants and had the requirements of: the applicant must live in Chicago, be at least 18 years old, have experienced economic hardship related to COVID-19, and have a household income at or below 250% of the federal poverty level. It was stated to be the largest universal basic income pilot program in the U.S. to date.

=== 2023 mayoral campaign ===
Lightfoot conversing after a mayoral election forum

In the 2023 Chicago mayoral election, a wide field of nine challengers qualified for the ballot. Polling of the race was largely inconsistent, but indicated that Lightfoot was in danger of losing re-election and that the candidates with the best chance of making a runoff were Lightfoot, U.S. Representative Chuy García, Cook County commissioner Brandon Johnson, former Chicago Public Schools CEO Paul Vallas, and businessman Willie Wilson.

Lightfoot faced controversy when she emailed public school teachers offering school credit for students who interned on her campaign and when she told South Side residents to either vote for her or not vote at all. Lightfoot ran ads tying García to Sam Bankman-Fried and Michael Madigan and accusing Johnson of wanting to reduce police budgets.

On February 28, 2023, Lightfoot finished in third place out of nine candidates. Therefore, she failed to qualify for the run-off election of the top two candidates. She garnered 16.81% of the vote, while Paul Vallas and Brandon Johnson received 32.90% and 21.63%, respectively. Johnson prevailed in the April 4, 2023 runoff. Lightfoot was the only of the seven eliminated candidates not to endorse either Johnson or Vallas ahead of the runoff.

=== Approval rating ===
Below is a table of polls on Lightfoot's approval rating among Chicagoans, descending from most to least recent:

Segment polled	Polling group	Date	Approve	Disapprove	Sample size	Margin-of-error	Polling method	Source
Registered voters	Echelon Insights	February 15–19, 2023	27%	66%	800 (RV)	± 4.5%	Text-to-web and telephone	
Registered voters	Mason-Dixon Polling & Strategy	January 31 – February 3, 2023	32%	61%	1,040 (LV)	± 4%	Telephone	
Likely voters	IZQ Strategies	January 27 – February 2, 2023	25%^{A}	73%	1,040 (LV)	± 3%	Text message	
Residents	The Harris Poll	December 2022	26%	53%				
Likely Voters	The Harris Poll	December 5–15, 2022	24%	53%	1,005 (LV)	± 4.0%	Online	
Likely voters	Impact Research (D) -poll sponsored by the International Union of Operating Engineers Local 150, which endorsed Chuy García for mayor	November 10–17, 2022		68%	700 (LV)	± 3.7%		
Likely voters	Public Policy Polling (for Chuy García campaign committee)	October 26–27, 2022	38%	—	616	± 4%	telephone and text message	
	Bendixen/Armandi	September 5, 2022	44%	54%				
	Commissioned by Pat Quinn during exploration of 2023 mayoral campaign	June 2022	28.5%	—				
Residents	The Harris Poll	June 7, 2022 – June 17, 2022	19%	54%	—	532	Online	
Likely voters	The Harris Poll	June 2022	22%	—			Online	
Likely voters	Impact Research (for Mike Quigley exploratory campaign committee)	March 21–27, 2022	36%	61%	600		telephone and text-to-web	
Residents	WGN-TV/Emerson College	August 13–15, 2021	43%	46%	1000	± 3%	telephone and online	
Registered voters	Emerson College	May 31 – June 1, 2021	48%	39%	1000	± 3%	telephone and online	
Residents	Change Research	May 7–11, 2021	53%	—	454	± 4.8%	online	
Registered voters	Wirepoints/RealClear Opinion Research	September 26 – October 4, 2020	61%	33%	895	± 3.28%	telephone and online	
Likely voters	GBAO Research + Strategy	June 21–23, 2020	78%	—	500	± 4.4%	—	
Likely voters	Global Strategy Group	May 18–22, 2020	75%	17%	126	± 8%	telephone	
Registered voters	Public Policy Polling	October 11–12, 2019	54%	15%	618	± 3.9%	telephone	
Likely voters	GBAO Research + Strategy	August 19–22, 2019	77%	13%	800	± 3.5%	telephone	
Registered voters	Victory Research	May 20–23, 2019	70.7%	25.6%	801	± 3.46%	telephone	

==== Notes on polls ====
^A 6% "strongly approve", 19% "somewhat approve", 25% "somewhat disapprove", 48% "strongly disapprove", and 2% "not sure".

== Post-mayoral career ==
After losing her bid for re-election as mayor of Chicago, Lightfoot began teaching a course (titled "Health Policy and Leadership") as a Menschel Senior Leadership Fellow at Harvard University's T.H. Chan School of Public Health.

== National politics ==
On March 6, 2020, shortly before the 2020 Illinois Democratic presidential primary, Lightfoot endorsed Joe Biden's candidacy for president.

Lightfoot appeared in a video shown on the opening night of the 2020 Democratic National Convention which also features Biden, Houston Police Chief Art Acevedo, activist Jamira Burley, activist Gwen Carr, and NAACP President Derrick Johnson.

Lightfoot was a 2020 Democratic United States Electoral College elector from Illinois, casting her votes for Biden as president and Kamala Harris as vice-president.

== Personal life ==
Lightfoot resides in the Logan Square neighborhood, on Chicago's Northwest Side. On May 31, 2014, she married Amy Eshleman, a former Chicago Public Library employee who became a full-time mother to the couple's adopted daughter.

Lightfoot has held Chicago Bears season tickets for 20 years, and is also a Chicago White Sox season ticket-holder. She is also a season ticket holder for the WNBA's Chicago Sky.

Lightfoot made an appearance on a TV mini-series called The Second City Presents: The Last Show Left on Earth.

Lightfoot is a Founding Trustee at Christ the King Jesuit High School in Chicago. She is also a member of St. James AME Zion Church.

During some of her years as a partner at Mayer Brown, Lightfoot earned approximately $1 million annually.

== Awards and honors ==
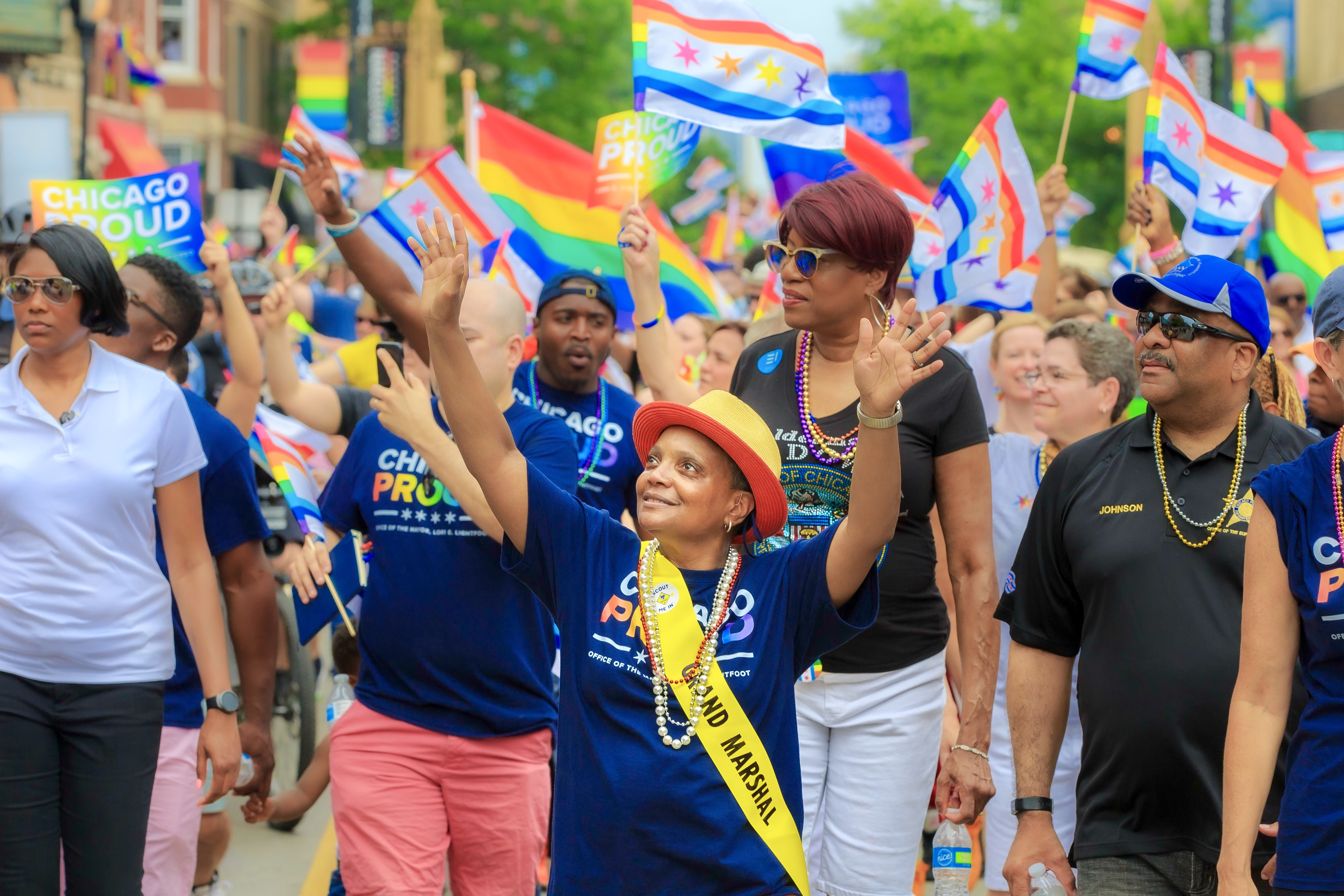
Lightfoot leading the 2019 Chicago Pride Parade

In June 2019, Lightfoot was selected as one of several grand marshals of the Chicago Pride Parade.

In June 2020, in honor of the 50th anniversary of the first LGBTQ Pride parade, Queerty named her among the fifty heroes "leading the nation toward equality, acceptance, and dignity for all people".

In October 2020, Lightfoot was chosen by the National Minority Quality Forum (NMQF) to receive the NMQF Honorable John Lewis Lifetime Achievement Award.

== Electoral history ==
2019 Chicago mayoral election
Candidate	General election		Runoff election	
Candidate	Votes	%	Votes	%
Lori Lightfoot	97,667	17.54	386,039	73.70
Toni Preckwinkle	89,343	16.04	137,765	26.30
William Daley	82,294	14.78		
Willie Wilson	59,072	10.61		
Susana Mendoza	50,373	9.05		
Amara Enyia	44,589	8.00		
Jerry Joyce	40,099	7.20		
Gery Chico	34,521	6.20		
Paul Vallas	30,236	5.43		
Garry McCarthy	14,784	2.66		
La Shawn K. Ford	5,606	1.01		
Robert "Bob" Fioretti	4,302	0.77		
John Kolzar	2,349	0.42		
Neal Sales-Griffin	1,523	0.27		
Write-ins	86	0.02		
Total	556,844	100	523,804	100

2023 Chicago mayoral election
Candidate	General election		Runoff election	
Candidate	Votes	%	Votes	%
Brandon Johnson	122,093	21.63	319,481	52.16
Paul Vallas	185,743	32.90	293,033	47.84
Lori Lightfoot (incumbent)	94,890	16.81		
Chuy García	77,222	13.68		
Willie Wilson	51,567	9.13		
Ja'Mal Green	12,257	2.17		
Kam Buckner	11,092	1.96		
Sophia King	7,191	1.27		
Roderick Sawyer	2,440	0.43		
Write-ins	29	0.00		
Total	564,524	100.00	612,514	100.00

== See also ==
- List of mayors of the 50 largest cities in the United States
- List of the first LGBT holders of political offices in the United States

== Notes ==
Political offices
Preceded by Rahm Emanuel	Mayor of Chicago; 2019–2023	Succeeded by Brandon Johnson
