= Erica Garner =

American activist (1990–2017)

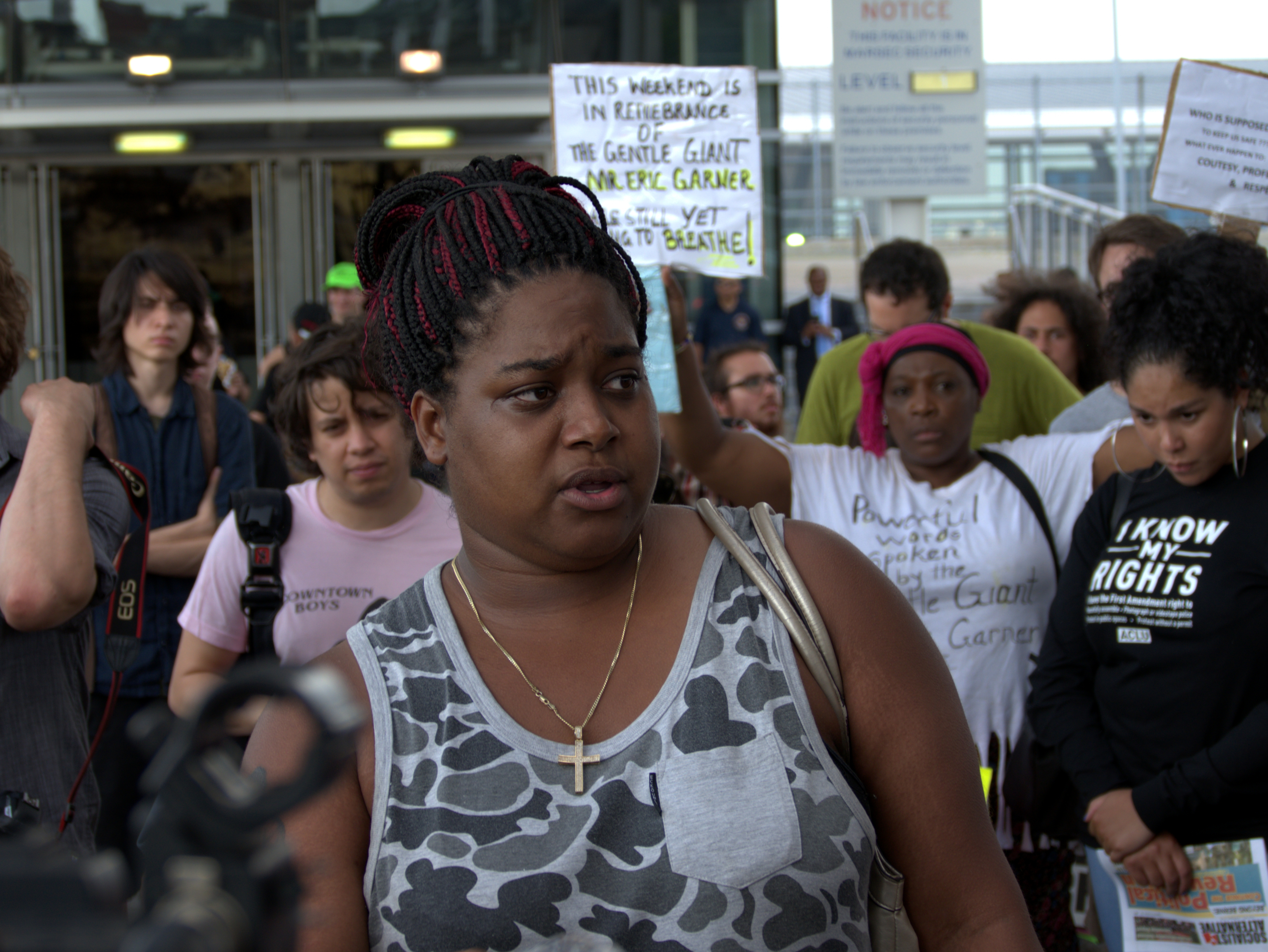
- Garner at a protest in 2016
- Born: May 29, 1990; Brooklyn, New York, U.S.
- Died: December 30, 2017 (aged 27); Brooklyn, New York, U.S.
- Cause of death: Cardiac arrest
- Occupation: Activist
- Years active: 2014–2017
- Children: 2
- Father: Eric Garner
- Relatives: Gwen Carr (grandmother)

Erica Garner-Snipes (May 29, 1990 – December 30, 2017) was an American activist who advocated for police reform, particularly in the use of force during arrests. Garner became involved in activism following the 2014 killing of her father, Eric Garner, after a New York City police officer placed him in a lethal chokehold during an arrest.

== Early life ==
Erica Garner, born on May 29, 1990, at Woodhull Hospital, was the daughter of Esaw Garner Snipes and Eric Garner, and grew up in Brooklyn, New York. She was the oldest of four children born to Eric and Esaw. Esaw had two older children from a previous relationship. As Eric's asthma and other health problems made it difficult for him to work, he played a large role at home in raising the children. When Garner was fourteen, her turbulent relationship with her mother deteriorated to the point that Esaw voluntarily placed her into foster care. Garner was placed with the Goode family in Far Rockaway, Queens. The family offered to adopt Garner; the adoption fell through, but Garner stayed with the family and they maintained a close relationship even after she became an adult.

== Activism ==
Garner became involved in activism in 2014 after her father died during the NYPD's attempt to arrest him for allegedly selling untaxed cigarettes, and she remained a critic of the NYPD up to her death. Beginning a month after his death and for the following year, Garner led twice-weekly marches visiting the scene of her father's death, visits which the media labeled a "die-in". She also marched in Black Lives Matter demonstrations and other protest events, and set up a foundation in her father's name. The aim of the foundation, named the Garner Way Foundation, is to "engage communities all over the world in social justice issues through political awareness, music, arts and activism." In addition, Garner campaigned to have the transcripts of the grand jury into her father's death made public.

Garner stated that she believed her father's death had more to do with police misconduct than race, and in 2017, she rejected a meeting with the United States Justice Department to discuss the circumstances surrounding her father's death. During the 2016 Democratic Party presidential primaries, Garner supported Bernie Sanders, and appeared in an advertisement for him as well as on the campaign trail.

== Personal life and death ==
Garner had two children. Shortly after the birth of her son Eric, named after her father, in August 2017, she suffered a heart attack. Doctors subsequently found that her heart was enlarged. On December 23, 2017, she suffered a second heart attack, after which she fell into a coma. She was left with "major brain damage", leading to her death on December 30, 2017. She died at Woodhull Hospital in Brooklyn surrounded by her family and foster family.

On the news of her death, New York Mayor Bill de Blasio said the city would "miss her unshakable sense of justice and passion for humanity", despite the fact that Garner had been a frequent critic of de Blasio during her lifetime. The New York Civil Liberties Union issued a statement saying that Garner "showed incredible courage and remarkable resolve" and "bravely transformed her unspeakable personal pain in[to] political power as she became a leader in the fight for police reform". The National Association for the Advancement of Colored People (NAACP) also issued a statement acknowledging her leadership and strength. Fellow activist DeRay Mckesson said, “Erica took the truth with her everywhere she went, even if that truth made people uncomfortable". Tweets were subsequently posted from Garner's official Twitter account demanding that de Blasio "explain how she died with no justice" and requesting that "out of respect to Erica please do not request comment if the journalist is not Black". These tweets were later found to have been posted by Garner's publicist.
