= Jamira Burley =

American activist and administrator

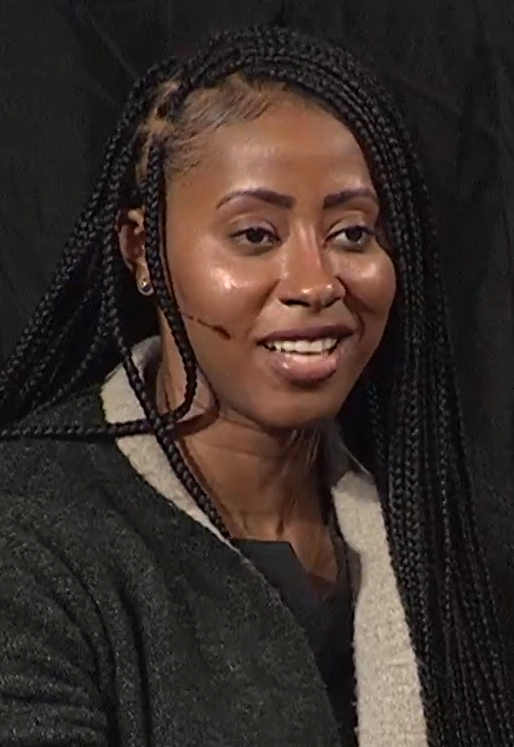
- Education: Temple University
- Occupations: Nonprofit Executive and Human Rights Activist
- Title: Chief of Community and External Partners at XQ Institute
- Website: www.jamiraburley.com

Jamira Burley is an international speaker, human rights activist and social impact strategist. She is currently the Chief of Community and External Partners at XQ Institute, and is a former Media Lab fellow at MIT and Civic Media Fellow at USC.

== Early life ==
Burley grew up in Philadelphia. She had fifteen siblings, including a brother who was murdered in an act of gun violence, and ten others who had been incarcerated at some point. Her father is serving a life sentence for murder, and her mother was a recidivist convict. Attending Overbrook High School, she founded Panther Peace Corps, a violence prevention group. After it was responsible for reducing violence by 30%, she received a grant from Governor Ed Rendell to expand the program to the ten high schools in Philadelphia with the highest rates of violence. She was the first of her siblings to graduate from high school, and graduated from Temple University, where she studied business and international studies.

== Career ==
In 2012, Burley became Philadelphia's youngest ever agency executive when she was named executive director of the Philadelphia Youth Commission by Mayor Michael Nutter.

Between 2014 and 2015, Jamira worked as Managing Director with Amnesty International, working on "a united approach to gun violence, police violence and criminal justice reform", according to The Guardian. During Hillary Clinton's 2016 presidential campaign she was named the National Deputy Director for millennial vote. In this role, she led a team of staff and volunteers, helped develop outreach strategies for voters aged 18–35 across the United States, and served as a campaign spokesperson. Her work included organizing voter-engagement events with groups such as millennial parents, women, veterans, labor organizations, and Latino and African-American communities In addition to national strategy, her role included work on the ground campaign in Pennsylvania, leading door knocking campaigns and other campaign work.

Burley became the sole American to sit on the United Nations Global Education First Initiative, Youth Advocacy Group. After the presidential election, she became the Senior Campaigner for Gun Violence and Criminal Justice with Amnesty International. Her advocacy work led to her receiving a "White House Champion of Change" award from the White House in Washington DC in 2014. Burley is currently Head of Youth Engagement and Skills at the Global Business Coalition for Education and former MIT Media Lab Director's Fellow.

Previously, Jamira was the Head Youth Engagement and Skills for the Global Business Coalition for Education, in United States. She also continues her human rights activities with Amnesty International USA. Burley appeared in a video shown on the opening night of the 2020 Democratic National Convention, which also features Democratic presidential nominee Joe Biden, Houston Police Chief Art Acevedo, activist Gwen Carr, NAACP President Derrick Johnson, and Chicago Mayor Lori Lightfoot.
