= George Floyd protests in Chicago =

2020 violent riots after the murder of George Floyd

- Date: May 28 – August 10, 2020 (2 months, 1 week and 6 days)
- Location: Chicago, Illinois, United States
- Caused by: Police brutality; Institutional racism against African Americans; Reaction to the murder of George Floyd; Economic, racial and social inequality; Opportunism
- Methods: Protests, civil disobedience, rioting, arson

Casualties
- Deaths: 15
- Injuries: 284+ police officers
- Arrested: 1,112+
- Damage: $66+ million
- Buildings destroyed: 2,100+ buildings damaged/looted, 71 buildings set on fire
- Charged: 157

The George Floyd protests in Chicago were a series of civil disturbances in 2020 in the city of Chicago, Illinois. Unrest in the city began as a response to the murder of George Floyd in police custody in Minneapolis on May 25, 2020. The demonstrations and riots, supporting justice for Floyd and protesting police brutality, occurred simultaneously with those of over 100 other cities in the United States. Chicago is among 12 major cities that declared curfews in order to prevent looting and vandalism. On May 31, Mayor Lori Lightfoot asked Illinois Governor J.B. Pritzker to send the Illinois National Guard to Chicago for the first time in the 52 years since the 1968 riots in Chicago. The economic damage caused by the disturbances exceeded $66 million.

== Events ==
=== May 28 ===
On May 28, Chicago Mayor Lori Lightfoot compared Floyd's murder to the murder of Laquan McDonald, saying "there but for the grace of God goes Chicago." Chicago Police Department Superintendent David Brown required officers to watch the video of Floyd's murder and undergo training on positional asphyxiation.

=== May 29 ===
Protesters gathered on May 29 in Millennium Park and marched through the Loop chanting Floyd's name. Demonstrators shut down several downtown streets and blocked traffic on the Eisenhower Expressway. Near the intersection of State and Harrison streets, several protesters were seen throwing bottles and climbing onto cars. One individual was arrested while carrying a gun. A small group of protesters demonstrated in front of Trump Tower near midnight. The protesters eventually broke up once they reached the Near North Side neighborhood, and protests eventually died down by the early-morning hours.

=== May 30 ===
Amateur video of protesters and police at Trump Tower (Chicago) 4:00 p.m. on May 30, 2020

During protests on May 30, one person died and six were shot. The Chicago Police reported multiple arrests and damaged property. Superintendent David Brown said 132 officers were injured, including one who suffered a broken wrist. Around 108 arrests were confirmed on the night of May 29–30, and Mayor Lightfoot called on protesters to remain peaceful, stating that "it's not easy when we have a president who is inciting violence. Let's be better than him."

Around 4:30 am CDT, a board-up company was covering the windows of the State Street Old Navy location, and the Champs store near the intersection of State and Madison streets had several damaged windows. Multiple marches were expected throughout the weekend. Another demonstration was planned for 2:00 p.m. on Saturday the 30th, and Mayor Lightfoot stated that "we're not going to tolerate" lawlessness. A large downtown parking ban was enacted, with vehicles unable to park anywhere from Chicago Avenue in the north to Ida B. Wells Drive in the south, and from Lake Shore Drive in the east to Wells Street in the west, roughly correlating to the downtown area plus the Magnificent Mile and River North neighborhoods.

A crowd, which swelled to around 3,000, initiated a demonstration at Daley Plaza around 2 p.m. on Saturday the 30th. Protesters carried signs and wore face masks saying "I Can't Breathe." By 3:30 p.m., hundreds were marching north, with some protesters reportedly throwing fireworks and bottles near officers. Some also tagged buildings, cars, and a bus shelter. Another group of protesters climbed on top of a 151 Sheridan CTA bus. Demonstrators gathered on three sides of a police vehicle that was backing up on Dearborn Street, and confrontations broke out between officers and protesters when a police car tried to drive down Monroe Street in the Loop.

By 4 p.m., the crowd had split into several groups heading in different directions, including Trump Tower, where it became markedly chaotic, with some throwing bottles and fireworks at officers. Authorities pushed protesters out of the way of a police vehicle. Along State Street, marchers heading northbound chanted "Black Lives Matter" and "I Can't Breathe," most of them wearing masks and many holding signs that read "Defund the Police" and "Justice for Floyd." On the Magnificent Mile, a demonstrator wore a mobile stereo around his neck as the song "Fight the Power" by Public Enemy played from it. Simultaneously, church bells rang from the Fourth Presbyterian Church. Protesters marched on Lake Shore Drive and Michigan Avenue, and the crowd began to enter the outer drive through a northbound entrance ramp. By 5 p.m., officers had responded to at least one dozen "10-1" calls, a police emergency. Some demonstrators reportedly tried to overturn a police car; others tried to hop onto another CTA bus. The Ohio and Ontario feeder ramps were closed by authorities as well as the ramps leading to Eisenhower Expressway (I-290). Additionally, the CTA temporarily suspended Red Line service between the Clark/Division and Sox-35th stations. Around 7:30 pm, at the intersection of Dearborn and Hubbard streets, a police vehicle was flipped over by demonstrators. A few minutes later, officers flipped it back again and protesters moved closer to the intersection of Kinzie and Dearborn streets.

By the evening, there was at least one report of injuries to police officers, including a sergeant who had broken his arm near Trump Tower. Mayor Lightfoot held a press conference just after 8 p.m., stating that the protests had "evolved into criminal conduct". Following the press conference, Lightfoot imposed a curfew on the city, lasting every night from 9 p.m. to 6 am, until further notice. Lightfoot stated that she had seen protesters use different blunt objects like pipes and hammers to damage property. "I've seen protesters hurl projectiles at our police department...bottles of water, urine and lord knows what else," she said.

Video depicting protests in downtown Chicago during the afternoon of May 30.

Chicago Police Superintendent David Brown gave a message to looters and rioters, stating that "We will be taking you into custody when you destroy property...That's just facts.'' He added that several buildings were vandalized, had broken windows, and that police utilized pepper spray and "arrests to prevent looting.''

Almost every storefront on Michigan Avenue saw some form of damage on Saturday evening, including the Loop locations of Zara, Nike, CVS, Walgreens, Neiman Marcus, and the Macy's storefront on State Street. Several shootings occurred well into the night: 2 males were shot at 9:30 pm on the 0 west block of Jackson Boulevard, and a 19-year-old man was shot an hour later on the 200 north block of Michigan Avenue. At 11 pm, another two males were shot at, this time on the 100 west block of Hubbard Street. One of them was pronounced dead at the scene, and the other suffered injuries. Shortly after 11:30 pm, the Chicago Fire Department responded to a fire at the Central Camera Company store on the 200 south block of Wabash Avenue. As a result of protests, the CTA temporarily suspended its services in the downtown area, and the northbound lanes of Lake Shore Drive at Roosevelt Road were closed. By the morning of May 31, most of the drawbridges spanning the Loop and River North remained up. The Chicago Police Department announced that 204 arrests were made on Saturday the 30th. 20 officers were confirmed to have been injured.

=== May 31 ===
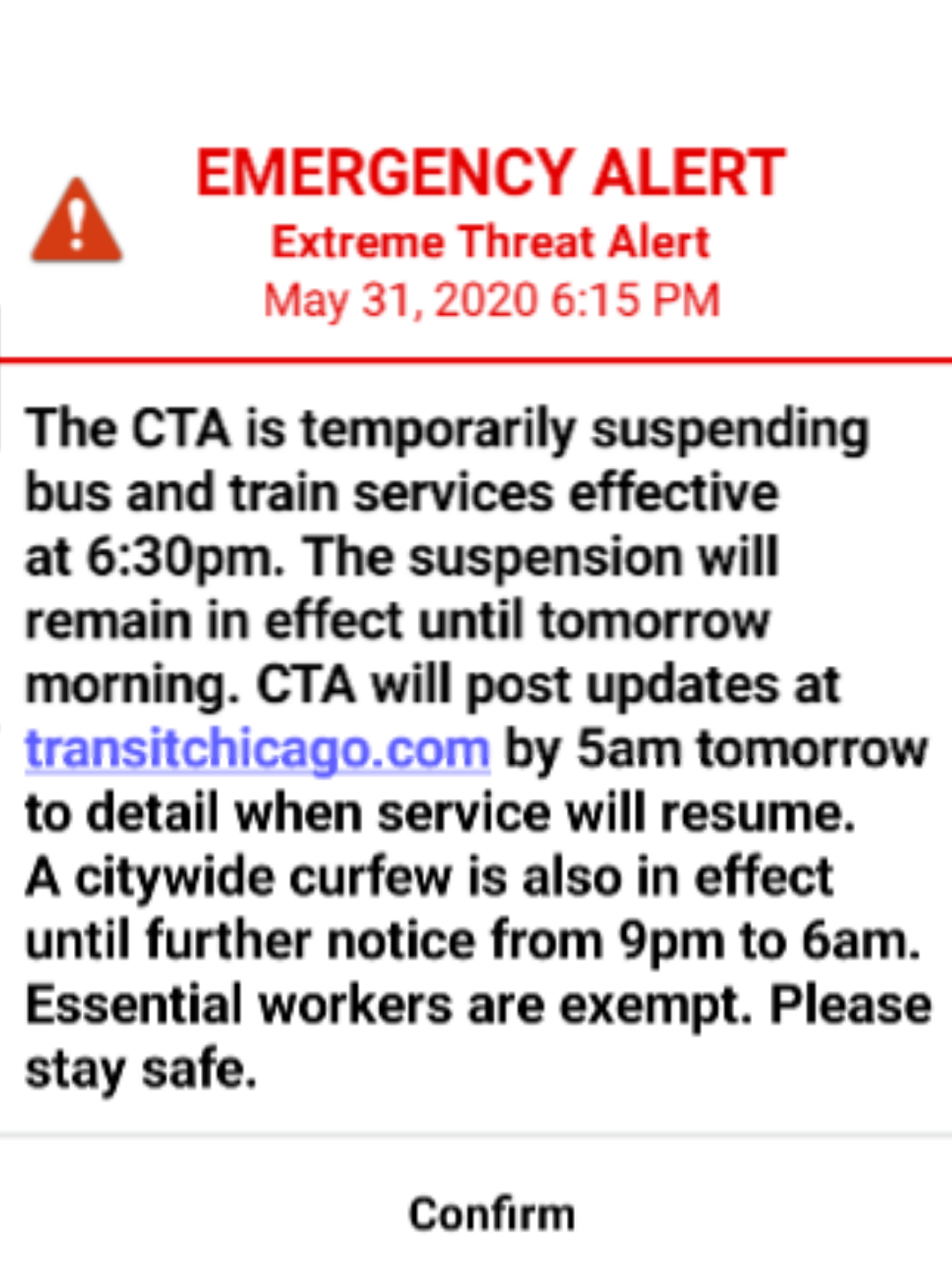
Warning sent to smartphones regarding a temporary suspension of CTA services on the night of May 31, 2020.

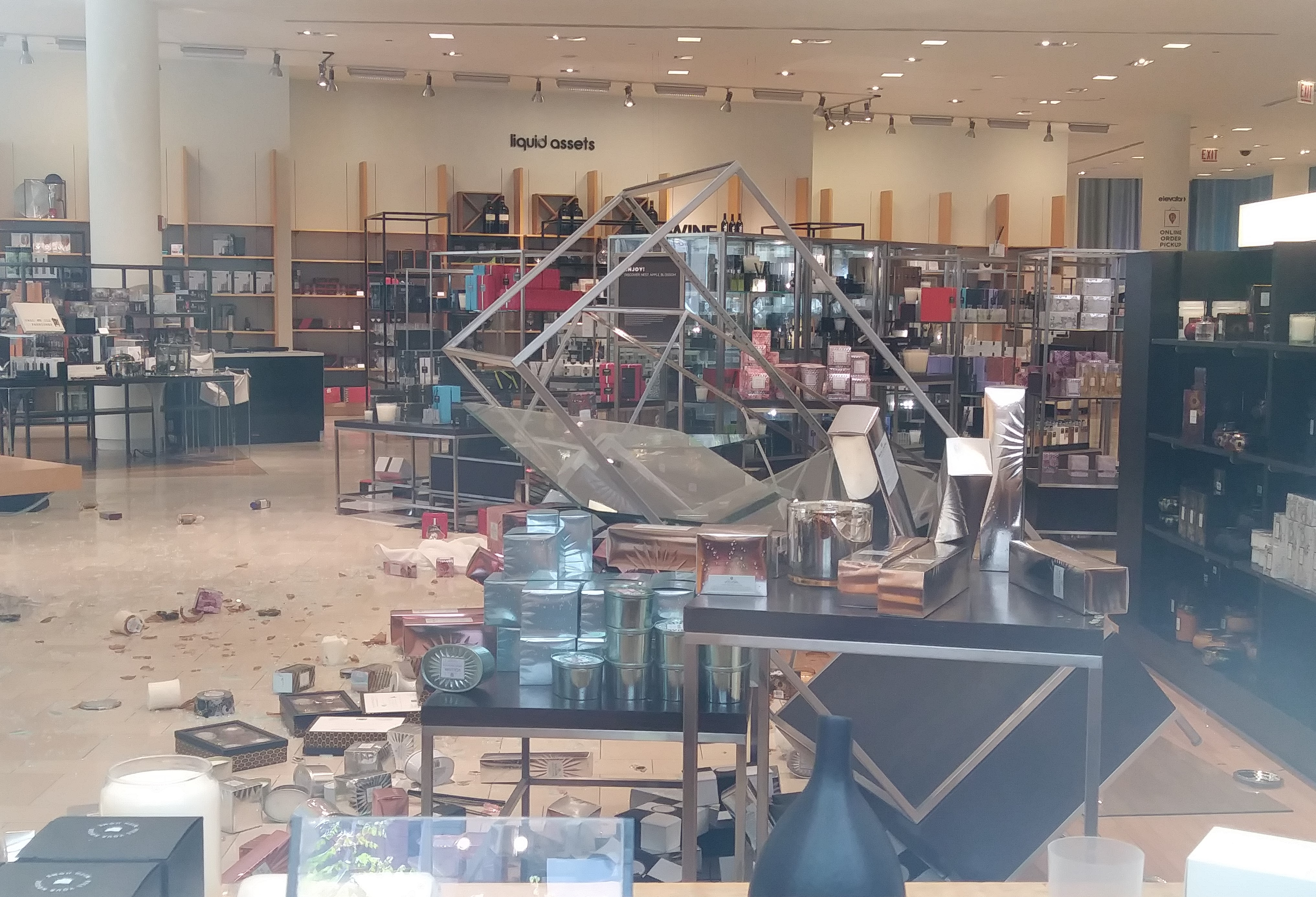
Damaged Bloomingdales store on May 31

The Illinois National Guard was summoned to the downtown area by Governor J.B. Pritzker, who said he had done so following a request from Mayor Lightfoot on early Sunday morning. "I want to be clear and emphasize: the Guard is here to support our Police Department," Lightfoot stated. "They will not be actively involved in policing and patrolling." The decision is considered the first time since 1968 that a Chicago mayor had asked for the National Guard's help in dealing with civil unrest and disturbances.

On Sunday morning, Target announced that it would be closing its seven locations in the Chicago neighborhoods of Hyde Park, McKinley Park, South Loop, State Street, Streeterville, Wilson Yard and West Loop. Just before noon, Lightfoot called for a moment of silence at 5pm. At approximately 3 pm, Metra suspended its services to and from Chicago's downtown. Despite these new measures, reports of looting, window-breaking, and other crimes began coming in, not from the downtown area as it had happened on the previous day, but from multiple areas across the entire city of Chicago in the early afternoon. At 3:30 pm, a group of about 24 officers were sighted at the intersection of Chicago Avenue and Kedzie Avenue, where a shopping strip seemed to have been looted. Cell phone stores, hair-braiding shops, and a Family Dollar location were damaged during the afternoon. In West Garfield Park, multiple storefronts were looted Sunday afternoon along Madison Street. A billow of smoke over Madison Street from a burning business was sighted east of Karlov Avenue. Shortly before 4 pm, the windows of Bronzeville Finer Foods were shattered. Just west of the Bronzeville Finer Foods, protesters gathered in front of Chicago Police headquarters, where officers stood in front of the entrance. At Guaranteed Rate Field, members of the Illinois National Guard set up a staging area in Lot A with Humvees. A dozen blocks south of the staging area, at the intersection of 47th Street and Halsted Avenue in Canaryville, protesters looted the City Sports Outlet. One man at the scene of the looting was nearly hit by a car. Further east, at the intersection of 47th Street and Michigan Avenue in Bronzeville, looters broke into a Western Union location.

In the Little Village neighborhood, looters stole products and merchandise from a shoe store and a T-Mobile location. Local Latino gangs worked in tandem to protect their neighborhood from any further looting, however, these attempts soon turned violent as a few gang members began targeting black people who lived in the area, mistaking them for looters, often attacking them while in their vehicles and resorting to lethal force. This, in turn, angered the black gangs of North Lawndale, leading to subsequent shootouts throughout the Little Village, North Lawndale, and Cicero, Illinois areas. Looters took to stealing from clothing and shoe stores on the Commercial Avenue shopping strip in the South Chicago neighborhood. The Chatham shopping mall near the intersection of 87th Street and Dan Ryan Expressway was also looted, with shopping carts littered throughout the Jewel and Home Depot parking lots. Demonstrators also entered a nearby Family Dollar.

Starting at 6:30 pm, at the request of authorities, the CTA suspended service on all bus routes and rail lines, according to its website. A fire was reported near the intersection of 59th Street and Ashland Avenue, while another one occurred at the intersection of 55th Street and Kedzie Avenue. Simultaneously, a group of demonstrators marched into Lake Shore Drive and blocked traffic for around twenty minutes despite police barricades, leading to heavy traffic. Crowds marched through the Hyde Park and River North neighborhoods on the evening of the 31st. In River North, officers utilized batons to beat protesters. In Old Town, a standoff between demonstrators and police lasted hours. Farther south in the city, the Walgreens location at the intersection of 79th Street and Racine Avenue was "emptied out". Around 9 pm, a group of mostly peaceful protesters were marching in downtown Chicago, and the crowd entered Lake Shore Drive, heading northbound before exiting. Also at about 9 pm, a fire at a shopping strip near 47th was put out.

Around 10:50 pm, on the 4200 west block of Van Buren Street, an 18-year-old woman was fatally shot in the head. Several hours earlier, a man was fatally shot, with two others being wounded while the three were standing outside with a group on the 5100 west block of Madison Street in the Austin neighborhood. In addition, two women were shot while driving on the 500 west block of Pershing Avenue when a mini-van pulled up and its occupant opened fire. In another incident, police stated that two men were shot while they walked down the 1200 north block of Washtenaw Avenue. One victim was shot in the hip, and the other was shot in the hand.

Multiple stores in Washington Park were looted during the evening, and another wave of looting appeared in the Wicker Park neighborhood, starting on Sunday night and lasting well into the early hours of Monday, June 1. Dozens of people were seen near a Foot Locker in the vicinity of the Milwaukee and Ashland Avenues intersection in Wicker Park. Firefighters responded early Monday to a fire at the 95th Street shopping center in the Jeffery Manor neighborhood. According to initial reports, 82 people were shot, 19 fatally, in Chicago over the May 30–31 weekend. The weekend surpassed the previous May 23–24 weekend, which was the most deadly Memorial Day weekend in Chicago since 2015 with 49 individuals shot in total and 9 deaths, becoming the most deadly weekend of the year to that date. Over half of the May 30–31 weekend victims were shot on Sunday.

=== June 1 ===
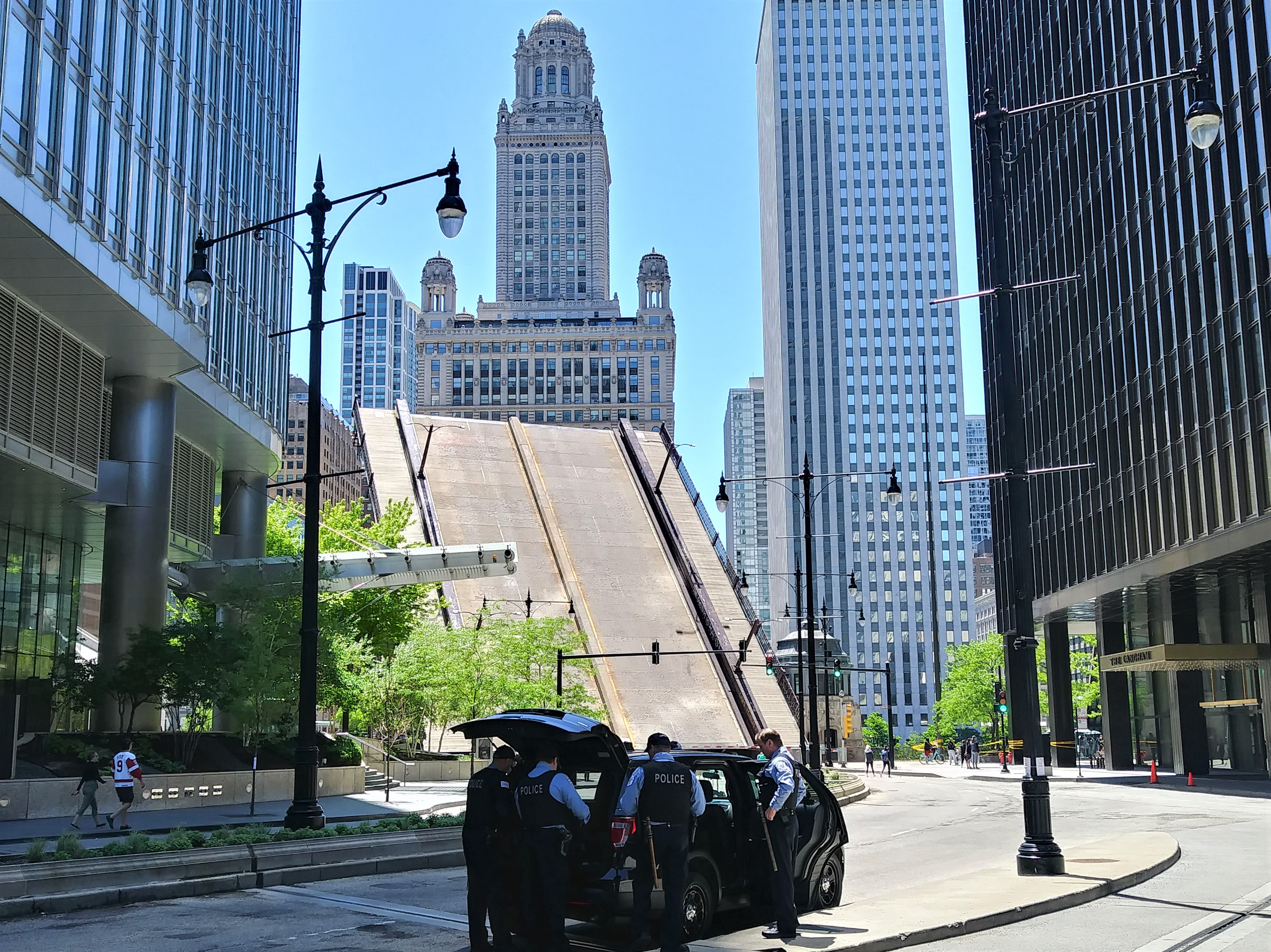
Bridge raised with Chicago police in foreground

CPS grab-and-go meal sites, which were started in April as response to the COVID-19 pandemic, were closed on Monday the 1st but scheduled meal delivery continued. Additionally, all Illinois community-based COVID-19 testing sites were closed on June 1. Also that morning, all exit ramps for the I-90/94 from 18th Street to Division Street were shut down until further notice.

At a press conference on Monday morning, Mayor Lightfoot denied that the city prioritized protecting the Loop over neighborhoods on the South and West Side over the weekend. "There is no way, no way, we would ever let any neighborhood receive more resources and protection than any others. Ever," Lightfoot stated. "That certainly didn’t happen over the course of the weekend...We did not stand by and let the South and West Sides burn as some are propagating." The city had shut down most access to Chicago's downtown the previous day after protesters burnt and looted businesses in the Loop. As a result of the measures, looters took to South and West Side neighborhoods. Chicago authorities were stationed across the city but were overwhelmed, Lightfoot said. The city's authorities had apparently received 65,000 calls in a 24-hour period. "The fact is, the violence that we saw and the looting we saw spread like a wildfire," she added. Police Superintendent Brown stated that 699 looting arrests were made on the 31st, and that at least 132 officers were injured on Sunday.

It was later discovered that in the early morning hours of June 1 as unrest swept the South and West sides of the city as many as 13 Chicago police officers lounged, slept and snacked in the burglarized South Side office of U.S. Rep. Bobby Rush. The group of officers – which included three supervisors – were captured on video surveillance footage discovered by Rush's staff.

Representative Rush was quoted as saying “They even had the unmitigated gall to go and make coffee for themselves and to pop popcorn, my popcorn, in my microwave while looters were tearing apart businesses within their sight and within their reach."

Livestreamed video of scenes of protests and looting downtown on June 2

The Nike location at the intersection of 85th Street and Cottage Grove saw looting around 2 pm. At 4 pm, a peaceful protest of several hundred people occurred on Lincoln Avenue. An hour later, demonstrators were gathered at Belmont and Wilton Avenues in the Lake View neighborhood, and the demonstration remained calm. At 6:30 pm, the march that had begun in Lake View reached the intersection of Broadway and Sunnyside avenues in Uptown. Around 7:30 pm, the CTA and Metra announced it would suspend its service for the night again. At 7:50 pm, demonstrators in Uptown went southbound on Broadway before heading east on Irving Park Road towards Lake Shore Drive. 30 minutes later, the same group of demonstrators was marching north on Lake Shore Drive. Shortly after the 9 pm curfew began, police officers confronted a group of men on Broadway Avenue who were throwing rocks and bricks. The group was dispersed by the officers, who did not use any chemical irritants.

During the weekend, it was reported that the hacktivist group Anonymous had infiltrated the Chicago Police's radio systems, blaring "Fuck tha Police" by N.W.A to disrupt radio communication.

The economic cost of the riots and looting in the final days of May through June 1 were estimated at $66 million.

=== August 9–10 ===
After the police shot a man in Englewood, hundreds of people rioted in Northern Chicago. The riots primarily targeted the Magnificent Mile, where dozens of stores were looted, causing over $60 million in damage. The rioters clashed with police, wounding at least 13 police officers and inflicting damage upon police cars. In an attempt to hinder the movements of the rioters, bus and train services were suspended, several drawbridges were raised, and freeways were shut down. Two people were shot during the rioting, a bystander and a private security guard from the Loop, the latter of whom was hospitalized in critical condition, and over 100 people were arrested in connection with the looting. Although the police department and the mayor of Chicago stated that the initial police shooting involved a confrontation with Latrell Allen, a 20-year-old man who had fled from the police and then fired his weapon at them, many of the rioters were led to believe that the police had instead shot and killed a 15-year-old boy, a belief that the mayor described as a 'false rumor on social media.' Black Lives Matter Chicago disputed the police version of events and renewed its calls for reform of the Chicago Police Department, which they say has an extensive record of racism and abusive tactics.
