= Central Camera =

Camera shop in Chicago

The neon sign above the store in 2010

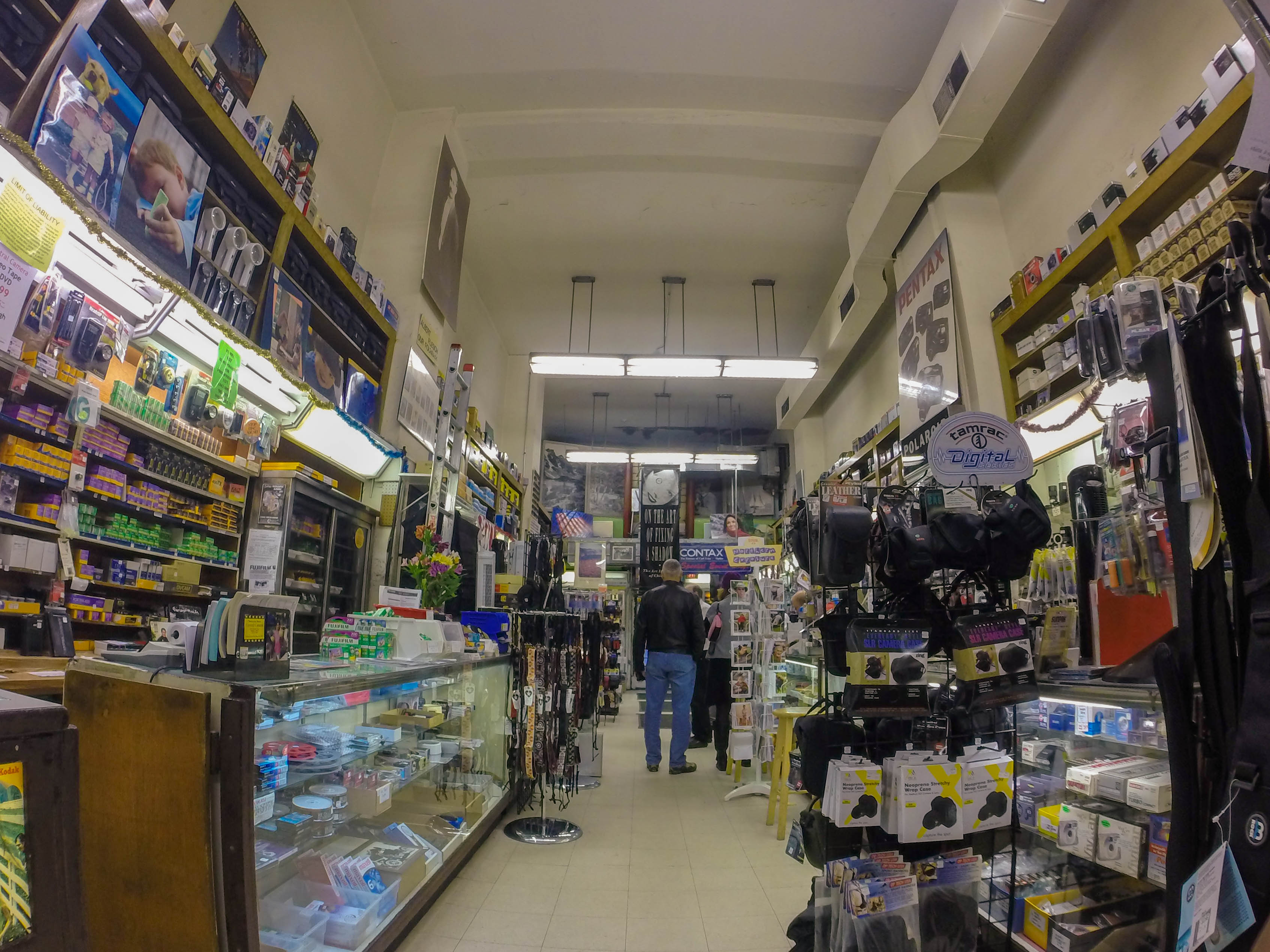
Inside the store in 2013

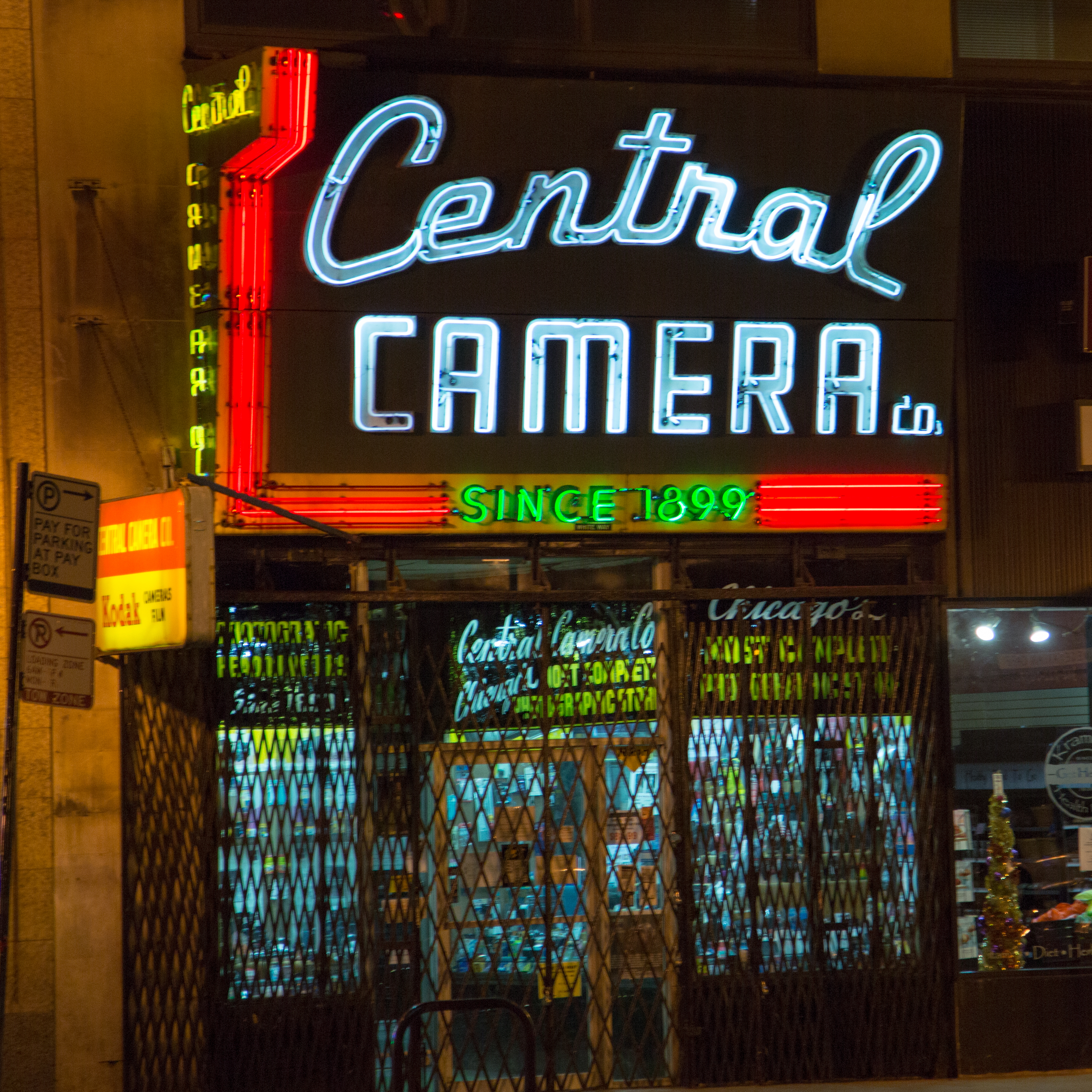
The store at night in 2012

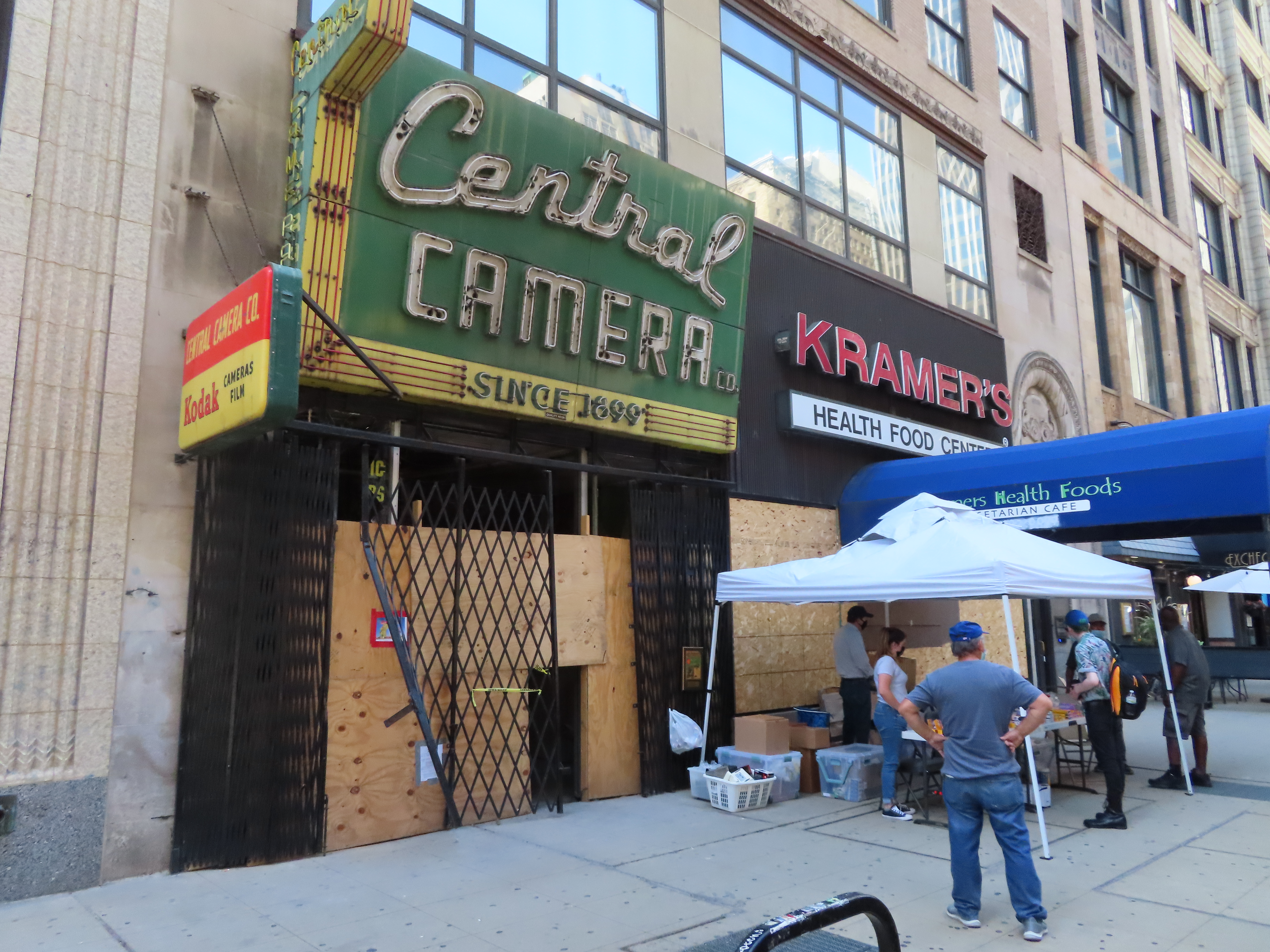
The store in 2020, boarded up after the George Floyd protests

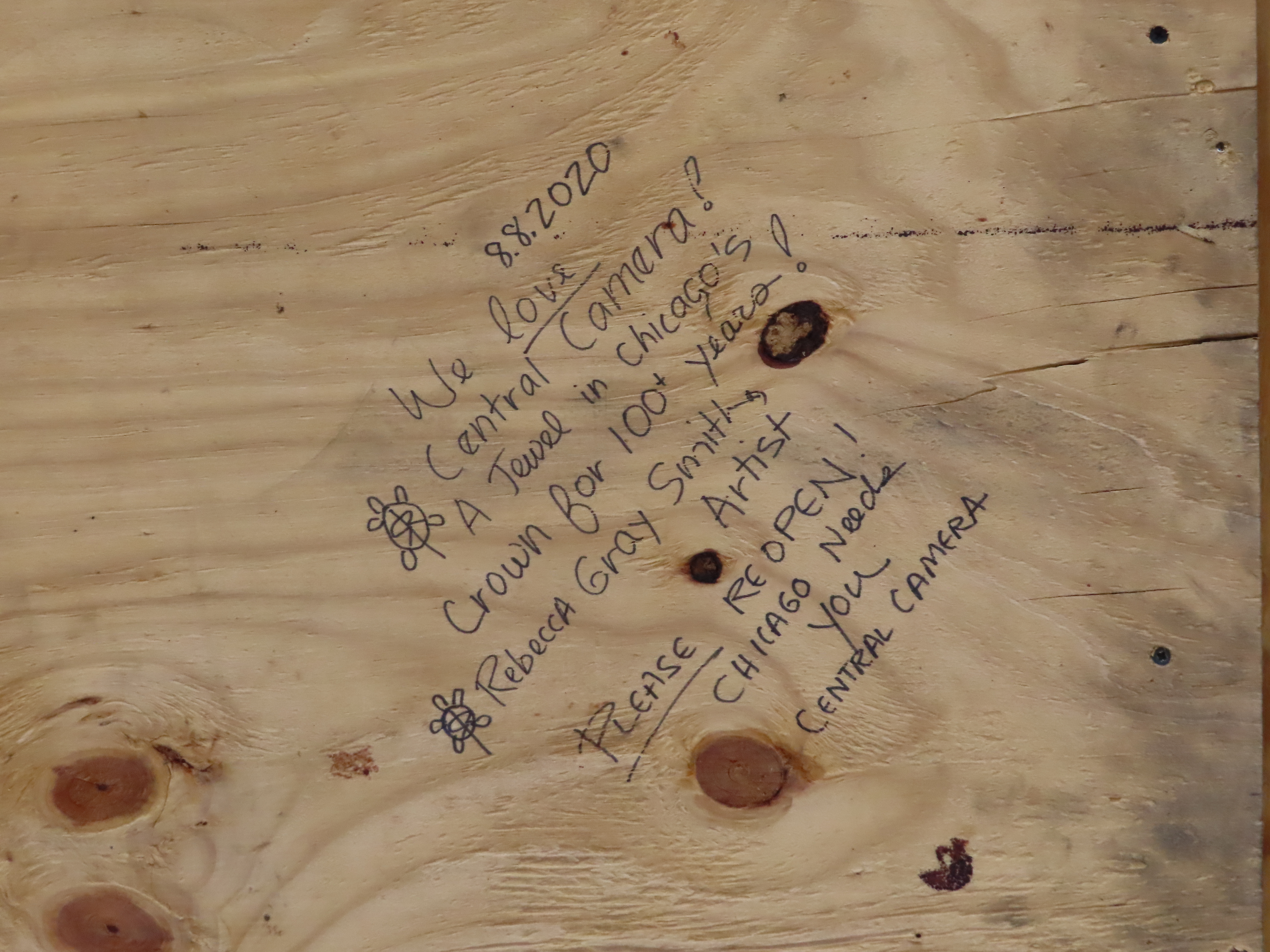
A note left on the store after it was burned in 2020

Central Camera is a camera shop at 230 South Wabash in Chicago, Illinois.

== History ==
Central Camera is the oldest camera store in the city. It opened in 1899 at 31 Adams Street. It was started by a Hungarian immigrant, moved to its current South Loop location in 1929 and is currently operated by a third-generation owner. In 2020, radio station WBBM referred to it as "a museum of photography", due to the large number of historic cameras in the store.

In 2020, it was burned in a two-alarm fire during the George Floyd protests. The owner stated his intention to repair and reopen the store. A GoFundMe campaign had raised over $200,000 for rebuilding by mid-June 2020, with the first donation being $1,899 (the number representing the year that the store opened). While rebuilding took place, the business operated in an adjacent vacant storefront. The store reopened in June 2022.
