= Gwen Carr =

American activist, public speaker and author

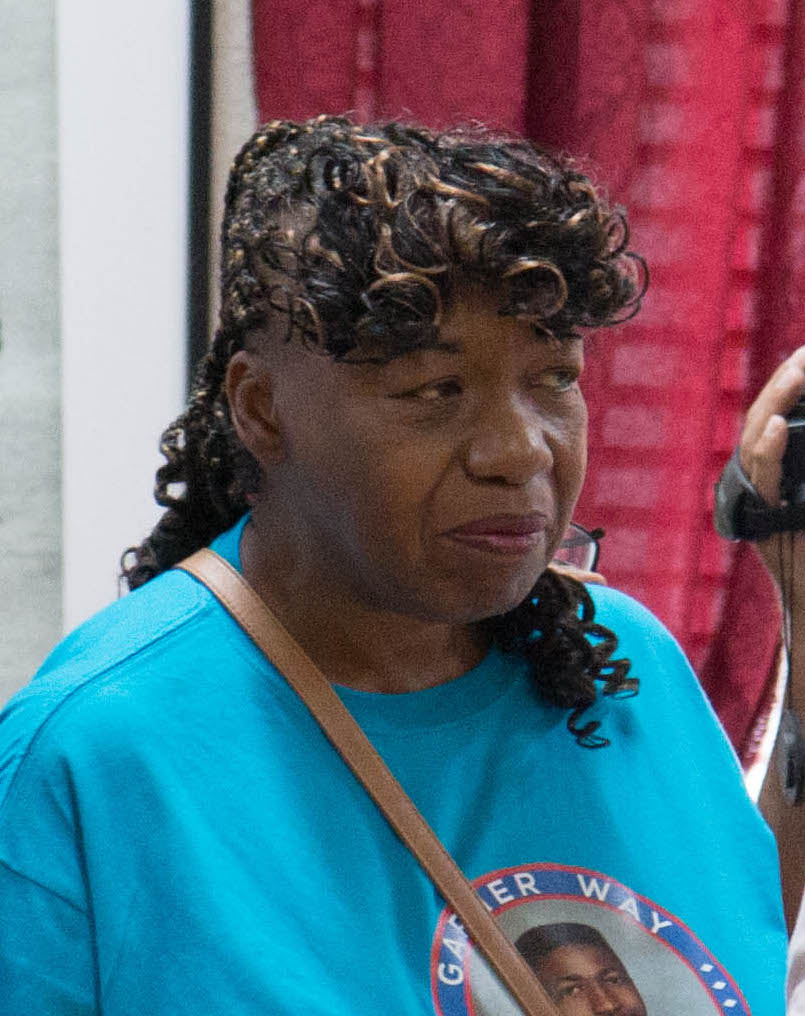
- Carr in 2016
- Born: 1949 (age 76–77)
- Occupations: Activist; Public speaker Author
- Children: Eric Garner
- Relatives: Erica Garner (granddaughter)

Gwen Carr (born 1949) is an American activist, public speaker, and author. Carr's son, Eric Garner, was killed by a New York Police Department officer who used a prohibited chokehold to arrest Garner. Since her son's death, Carr has become active in police reform in the United States, including as a member of Mothers of the Movement and a voice in the Black Lives Matter movement.

== Death of son, Eric Garner ==
On July 17, 2014, Carr's son Eric Garner was killed by a New York Police Department officer who used a prohibited chokehold while arresting Garner. Garner's death was filmed, with "I can't breathe" being his final words, which went viral and became a mantra of the Black Lives Matter ("BLM") and anti-police brutality movement. Carr became part of the BLM movement and became a leading supporter of justice for the death of her son. On December 4, 2014, a grand jury declined to indict the police officer, Daniel Pantaleo. Carr expressed disappointment and frustration at the decision.

== Activism ==
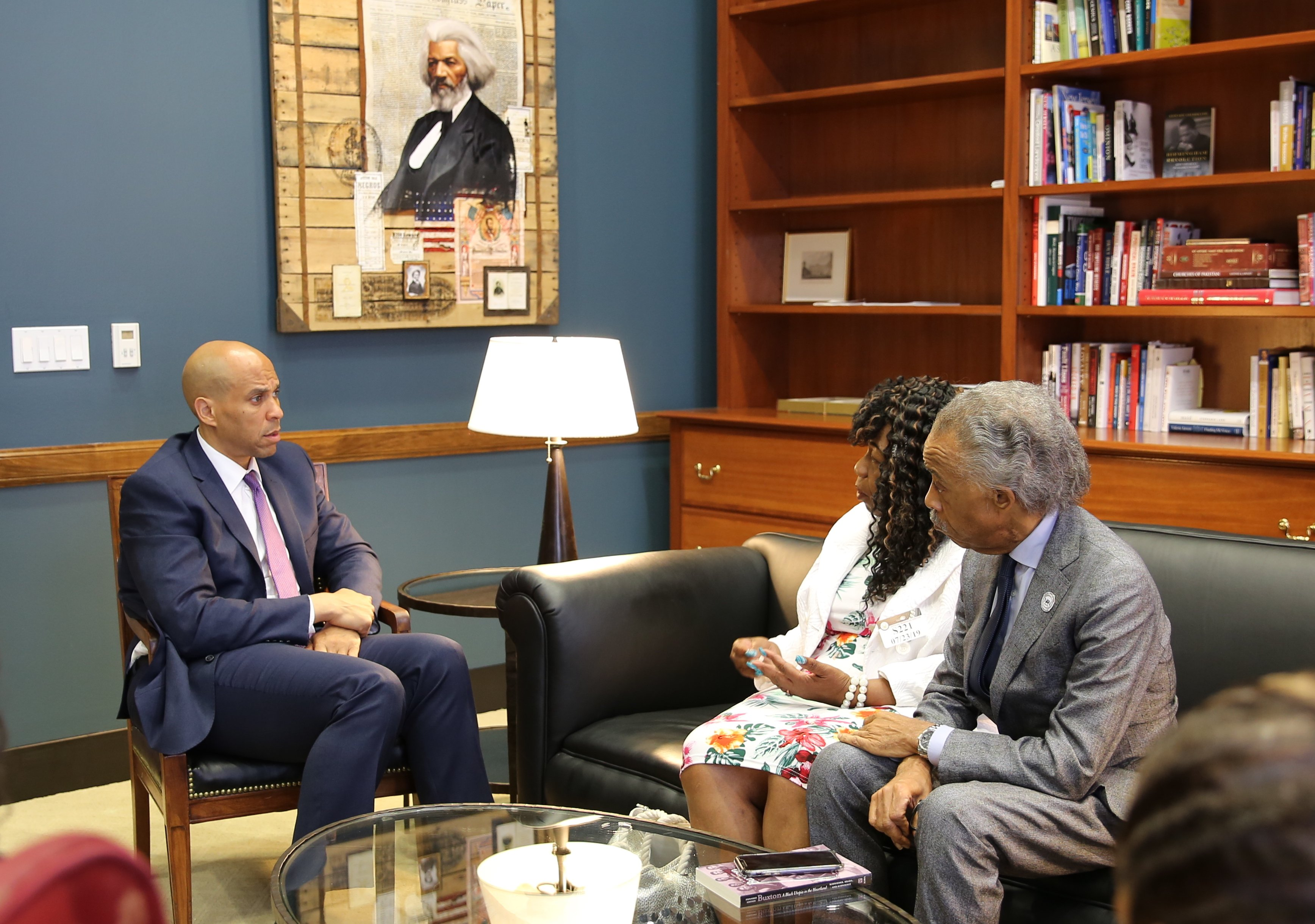
Carr and Al Sharpton meeting with Cory Booker in 2019.

Before becoming an activist, Carr worked for the Metropolitan Transportation Authority as a train operator. She retired in 2015 to devote her work to the civil rights movement. Carr often makes appearances with Al Sharpton and National Action Network at protests and rallies opposing police brutality and supporting Black Lives Matter.

Carr is a critic of New York City Mayor Bill de Blasio, who in 2016 opposed a bill that would have banned police officers from using chokeholds. Carr did not vote for de Blasio in the 2017 election. She endorsed Hillary Clinton in her 2016 run for president.

In September 2019, Carr testified in front of the House Judiciary Committee about police brutality, alongside James Blake and Al Sharpton.

After the videotaped murder of George Floyd, choked by Minneapolis police in May 2020, Carr immediately contacted and consoled Floyd's family. Just like her son, Floyd's last words were "I can't breathe." After her first conversation with the Floyd family, she told them: "Don't forget. You cannot let this go."

Carr spoke at protests in Queens, New York and Staten Island, followed by attending Floyd's memorial service in Minneapolis and Floyd's funeral in Houston.

On the opening night of the 2020 Democratic National Convention, Carr appeared in a video that also featured Democratic presidential nominee Joe Biden, Houston Police Chief Art Acevedo, activist Jamira Burley, NAACP President Derrick Johnson, and Chicago Mayor Lori Lightfoot.

== Works by Gwen Carr ==
- This Stops Today: Eric Garner's Mother Seeks Justice after Losing Her Son. Lanham: Rowman & Littlefield Publishers (2018). ISBN 1538109808
- "Four Years Ago The NYPD Killed My Son. I'm Still Waiting For Justice.". BuzzFeed News. 12 October 2018.
- "I Am Eric Garner's Mother. No Justice for George Floyd Unless All Four Police Are Charged—and Convicted". Newsweek. 1 June 2020.
- "The Nightmare Was Never Over." Good Morning America. 13 July 2020.

== Personal life ==
Carr lives on Staten Island, New York. She is a member of Sigma Gamma Rho sorority.
