= Dismissal of Robert Rialmo =

Dismissal of Chicago Police officer

The Dismissal of Robert Rialmo
- Date: December 26, 2015; 10 years ago
- Location: Chicago, Illinois, U.S.
- Participants: Chicago Police Officer (CPD) Robert Rialmo (shooter); Quintonio LeGrier (victim)
- Outcome: Dismissal of Rialmo
- Deaths: Quintonio LeGrier, Bettie Jones
- Inquest: Chicago Police Board
- Accused: CPD Officer Robert Rialmo
- Charges: Wrongful death
- Trial: June 2018
- Verdict: Not guilty

The Chicago Police Board voted on October 17, 2019, to dismiss Chicago Police (CPD) Officer Robert Rialmo who fatally shot Quintonio LeGrier and neighbor Bettie Jones on December 26, 2015, while answering a 911 domestic violence call at the LeGrier residence in Chicago. The dismissal capped a "chaotic finish to a high-profile trial" where a judge first announced that the jury found Rialmo unjustified in his shooting of LeGrier, but erased the verdict promptly, after declaring that the jury found Rialmo feared for his life when he shot LeGrier.

== Overview ==
Officer Rialmo, who confronted 19-year-old LeGrier brandishing a baseball bat, shot LeGrier after he had swung the bat at Rialmo twice. Unbeknownst to the responding police officers, LeGrier had a history of behavioral issues and had previous episodes with law enforcement. Additionally, one of Rialmo's bullets struck and killed a neighbor, 55-year-old Jones, which had been intended for LeGrier.

Attorneys for the City of Chicago initially argued against Rialmo, contending he could have employed an alternative method of force. However, Rialmo was unequipped with a Taser on December 26, 2015. The Cook County State's Attorney's Office reviewed the incident and concluded that there wasn't any evidence to charge Officer Rialmo, stating that he had acted within boundaries and standards set forth by CPD and State of Illinois police conduct. This led to LeGrier's family filing a lawsuit in civil court for wrongful death, but the 2018 verdict had also found Rialmo's shooting justified, ruling that Rialmo had reacted out of reasonable fear when confronted by LeGrier who was swinging a baseball bat at him. A judge presiding over the wrongful death lawsuit against the City of Chicago and CPD Officer Robert Rialmo for the fatal shooting of Quintonio LeGrier in 2015 reversed a jury finding in favor of the teen's family. The jury's decision of justifiable homicide was unanimously supported by Chicago's Police Superintendent Eddie Johnson and Chicago's Fraternal Order of Police. Rialmo countered with his own lawsuit of “emotional pain inflicted as a result of the shooting.” Neither Rialmo nor the LeGrier family received any compensation from their respective lawsuits; the family of Bettie Jones received $16 million.

Controversy arose when the Chicago Police Board and its fledgling independent civilian arm, the Civilian Office of Police Accountability (COPA), was found to have hired an outside expert on the judicial use of force to investigate the shooting. It also was uncovered that COPA hid the report after their third party expert found the Rialmo shooting to be justified, overriding COPA's initial report of wrongdoing. CPD Superintendent Eddie Johnson objected to COPA's concealment of their expert's discrepant findings. Johnson further affirmed that the shooting was lawful and in-policy, reiterating his earlier decision of defending Officer Rialmo. However, his objections were disregarded and a disciplinary case was sent to the Chicago Police Board nonetheless.

Eventually, the controversy culminated in Superintendent Eddie Johnson's reversal of his original decision and stated that Rialmo was unjustified in the shooting of LeGrier and Jones, which contradicted his early defense of Rialmo calling the shooting justified. The Chicago Police Accountability Task Force (CPATF) called for by Mayor Rahm Emanuel to investigate the murder of Laquan McDonald and headed by the present Mayor of Chicago Lori Lightfoot, recommended Officer Rialmo be fired in December 2017. After months of controversy, investigations, and flip-flops, Rialmo was dismissed from the Chicago Police Department in October 2019.

== Profile ==
=== Quintonio LeGrier ===
Quintonio LeGrier was 19 years old, born on Chicago's South Side and raised by a foster mother from the age of five. On the morning of December 26, 2015, he argued with his biological father and mother concerning his withdrawal from Northern Illinois University where he was a student in its College of Engineering in DeKalb, Illinois. LeGrier had been arrested by the DeKalb Police Department on five different occasions. On January 15, 2015, and March 1, 2015, he was charged with resisting arrest, obstruction and attempting to disarm an officer. The following day, March 2, 2015, he was arrested and recharged with obstruction. On May 6, 2015, LeGrier was arrested a fourth time and charged with aggravated battery. He was arrested a fifth time, September 22, 2015, and charged with disorderly conduct, assault, and resisting/obstructing an officer. LeGrier had a history of behavioral issues and “on more than one occasion sought medical help for his erratic behavior.”

=== CPD Officer Robert Rialmo ===
Robert Rialmo was born and raised on Chicago's North Side. He joined the United States Marine Corps (USMC) and was deployed for one tour of duty in Afghanistan. After serving four years, he was honorably discharged from the USMC and joined the Chicago Police Department. Prior to the instigating event for his dismissal, he had ten documented use of force incidents and one complaint of neglect of duty, later deemed to be unfounded. In November 2017 he was suspended for 11 days for an unknown violation.

== Timeline of events ==
=== 911 call ===
On December 26, 2015, at approximately 4:28 AM, Chicago Police Officer Robert Rialmo and his partner, Anthony LaPalermo, working in the Austin CPD district, were dispatched to 4710 W. Erie, in the Garfield Park neighborhood, responding to four separate 911 calls requesting “urgent police assistance.” The first three of the four 911 calls were made by Quintonio LeGrier, during which he told the dispatcher that someone was threatening his life and requested police assistance. Shortly after, Antonio LeGrier, Quintonio LeGrier's father, called 911. He told the 911 dispatcher that his son was armed with a baseball bat and was trying to break down his bedroom door. Neither the son, Quintonio LeGrier, nor his father, Antonio LeGrier, offered additional details, such as requesting a crisis healthcare worker. Based on the information provided by the 911 calls, the 911 dispatchers, and then relayed data to the responding officers, none were aware that Quintonio LeGrier suffered from “behavioral issues and that he also had prior contact with law enforcement in which he demonstrated erratic behavior.” LeGrier's prior conduct and behavioral issues would “likely be admissible in any criminal proceeding against the officers as corroborative evidence of witness statements describing LeGrier’s behavior that morning, which were described as threatening and erratic."

=== Police response ===
On the morning of December 26, 2015, CPD Officers Rialmo and LaPalermo approached his father's residence at 4710 W. Erie in Chicago. Rialmo went to the front door with his partner, who was behind him and rang the doorbell. The neighbor, Bettie Jones, opened the front door for Officer Rialmo. Following this, “Quintonio LeGrier was heard opening the upstairs apartment door and running down the stairs toward the front landing, then opened the door and stepped between Rialmo and Jones brandishing an aluminum baseball bat.” As the officers began to move back, LeGrier “moved towards them with the aluminum baseball bat raised in both hands above his head." Rialmo and his partner retreated down the stairs while maintaining visual contact on LeGrier, but LeGrier kept advanced in a threatening manner and “swinging the bat.” As the officers retreated down the stairs, LaPalermo tapped Rialmo on his back and shouted: “Look out!” LeGrier “continued to charge the officers” Rialmo drew his service weapon (9mm Luger) and “fired eight times towards LeGrier." LeGrier was shot at least six times and fell across the threshold of Jones’ apartment door. The fifty-five-years-old Jones was also shot once in the chest from a bullet intended for LeGrier and died. She fell to the floor, near the entrance of her first floor apartment.

== Aftermath ==
=== Cook County State's Attorney ===
Facing an outcry from the community regarding another Chicago Police Department-related shooting of a young African-American man, Laquan McDonald, Chicago's Mayor Rahm Emanuel requested answers from the CPD. The Cook County State's Attorney sought criminal charges against Rialmo, but could not find any reason for prosecuting him. “A criminal prosecution for first or second-degree murder would require proof beyond a reasonable doubt that Rialmo was not legally justified in using deadly force against LeGrier." In other words, a judge or jury would “need to determine and establish that Officer Rialmo did not reasonably believe he, or his partner LaPalermo, were in imminent danger of great bodily harm from LeGrier.” Evidence confirmed that LeGrier was armed with a weapon when the officers responded to a 911 call and that LeGrier was brandishing a weapon in a threatening manner while charging the officers. Under Illinois law, "a baseball bat is considered a deadly weapon." The evidence was insufficient to endorse the prosecution of Officer Rialmo beyond a reasonable doubt that he was not legally justified in shooting LeGrier. In addition, it does not support a prosecution for the death of Bettie Jones, which under Illinois law states that an individual acting in self-defense and kills a bystander accidentally is not criminally liable for the bystander's death. (People v. Getter, 2015 IL App (1st) 121307). Therefore, if Rialmo was legally justified in using deadly force against LeGrier, he could not be criminally charged with the death of Bettie Jones applying the “same legal analysis as the shooting of LeGrier.” Additionally, the Cook County State's Attorney could not establish the fact beyond a reasonable doubt that Officer Rialmo engaged in any criminal conduct when he fired his weapon causing the deaths of both LeGrier and Jones and announced that Officer Rialmo acted in self-defense out of fear of being killed.

=== Wrongful death civil action ===
Three days after the shooting, a civil action was filed by the LeGrier Family on December 28, 2015, by attorney Bill Foutris for wrongful death. The trial lasted up until June 26, 2018. Experts hired by the City of Chicago testified that Rialmo had followed proper procedures. Defense attorneys Brian Gainer and Joel Brodsky called an expert witness, Emanuel Kapelsohn, who had been hired by the city to review the case. In his testimony, he said Officer Rialmo's use of deadly force was "in line with police standards." He also told jurors that LeGrier posed a threat since he was swinging a deadly weapon as he walked toward Rialmo, and called attention to “LeGrier's father, who had locked himself in his bedroom and called the police to control his son.” The LeGriers could not corroborate that they claimed Rialmo retreated several feet off the front porch and was in no immediate physical danger since they were locked in their bedroom and could not have witnessed the shooting. Kapelsohn said that officers are trained to shoot in the chest, and as many times as necessary to remove any threats which in this case was fear of losing his life. Contentions that bullet casings found by the sidewalk confirmed Rialmo's distance from LeGrier, nullifying Rialmo's claim that he was in imminent danger, were discounted by the defense and Kapelohn since numerous paramedics and other CPD officers arriving at the scene could have inadvertently kicked them while attempting to administer emergency aid to LeGrier and Jones. Additionally, the defense contended that the normal ejection of bullet casings from Rialmo's pistol would have placed the casings away from Rialmo's position and by the sidewalk as he shot LeGrier. A judgment in favor of the defendants, Robert Rialmo and the City of Chicago, was reached on June 26, 2018. Rialmo was found not guilty of wrongful death and the City of Chicago was also exonerated. A new trial was subsequently denied. The appellate court mandate for an appeal was dismissed on August 2, 2018.

=== Counterclaim by Rialmo ===
A lawsuit was filed by Robert Rialmo's attorney, Joel Brodsky, on February 5, 2016. Rialmo claimed in the countersuit that he had been assaulted and afflicted with emotional distress as a result of the shooting. He asked for more than $10 million from LeGrier's estate for emotional damage. “LeGrier knew his actions toward Officer Rialmo were extreme and outrageous, and that his conduct was atrocious and utterly intolerable in a civilized community,” the complaint states. It stated that by “forcing Officer Rialmo to end LeGrier’s life and Jones’s innocent life caused him to suffer extreme emotional trauma.”

=== Judge reverses award to the LeGrier family ===
Judge Rena Marie Van Tine first announced that jurors had sided in favor of Quintonio LeGrier's parents who sued the City of Chicago and Officer Rialmo and awarded them $1.05 million in damages. But seconds later, Judge Van Tine revealed that the jurors had also signed a specific interrogatory, which is a clear and definitive question to a jury. The jury unanimously found that Rialmo fired because LeGrier posed grave danger of death or bodily harm to himself or his partner. Therefore, the judge said that the answer to that specific question overrode the verdict. Cook County initially awarded $1.05 million to LeGrier's parents, Janet Cooksey and Antonio LeGrier. The family had sued for $25 million. However, Judge Rena Marie Van Tine reversed the decision after learning that the jury found Rialmo had feared for his life when responding to the 911 call in the special interrogatory. The judicial decision meant that the family would not receive the predetermined award of $1.05 million. Jurors specifically signed an interrogatory finding that Rialmo fired from reasonable fear of death. Judge Van Tine ruled that the interrogatory outweighed any prior decision in favor of LeGrier's estate, and instead, found in favor of Rialmo. The jury also found in Rialmo's favor concerning his lawsuit filed against the LeGrier estate for infliction of emotional distress. However, the jury did not award Rialmo any monetary award. Jury foreman, David Fitzsimmons, said that the jurors "didn’t believe Rialmo was a bad person, [but] he made a bad decision at that split moment.” Rialmo's defense attorney, Joel Brodsky, said that the strained relationship LeGrier's parents had with their son factored into the jury's decision not to award any money for pain and suffering since LeGrier was raised by a legal guardian until he turned eighteen-years-old. Rialmo was quoted as saying, "I will always regret that I was forced to end the lives of two people. Even being justified does not change the fact that it was a tragedy for everyone, including the people of Chicago, whom I only wanted to [serve] and protect."

=== Bettie Jones settlement ===
On January 4, 2016, a civil action was filed by Latarsha Jones on behalf of Bettie Jones, by Chicago attorneys Power, Roger & Smith for wrongful death, which lasted until September 5, 2018. The City of Chicago reached a settlement to pay $16 million to the family of Bettie Jones, the innocent bystander who opened the door for CPD Officer Rialmo the morning of December 26, 2015 and was accidentally killed.

=== CPD Superintendent defends Rialmo ===
CPD Superintendent Eddie Johnson defended his earlier approval that Rialmo's decision was justified, even though it was in disagreement with Mayor Emanuel's newly appointed Civilian Office of Police Accountability (COPA). Johnson maintained his defense of Rialmo while stating that although the double shooting was a tragedy, he maintained his support of Rialmo over fatal shootings. In December 2017, COPA recommended Rialmo be fired, asserting that their investigators found no evidence to support Rialmo's claim that the shooting was justified. But in March 2018, Johnson rejected COPA's assertions and maintained that Rialmo's shooting was justified and within department policy. “An investigation should not second-guess an officer’s decisions by suggesting how COPA itself would have resolved the incident. Instead, an investigation must address the question of whether the officer, while making split-second decisions in tense, uncertain, and rapidly evolving circumstances, acted like any other reasonable CPD member on the scene would have done,” Johnson wrote in a letter responding to COPA's findings.

=== Rialmo's disciplinary hearing by Chicago Police Board ===
The impasse between CPD Superintendent Eddie Johnson continued in March 2018. Both COPA and Johnson could not reach an agreement over any disciplinary action, if any, should be taken against Rialmo. The disagreement meant that a single member of the Chicago Police Board could act as a tie-breaker to decide whether or not the full board would hear a case against Rialmo or not, even though Rialmo was acquitted of wrongful death and had acted in fear of being killed earlier. Chicago Police Board member Eva-Nina Delgado voted to move Rialmo's case forward on April 19, 2018. Since this single member of the Chicago Police Board sided with COPA, Rialmo would face disciplinary action by the Chicago Police Board and its eight other mayoral-appointed members.

=== CPD Superintendent assails Rialmo ===
Seven months later, on November 7, 2018, Eddie Johnson eventually filed disciplinary charges with the Chicago Police Board and recommended that Rialmo be fired over Jones’ death. Vice President Martin Preib of Chicago's Fraternal Order of Police criticised Johnsons’ volte-face as: “It was our understanding that the superintendent has determined this shooting was justified. The Fraternal Order of Police would be sorely disappointed if the leadership of the department has changed that decision.” The charges filed by Johnson include: 1) accusing Rialmo of disobeying an order, 2) inattention to duty, 3) bringing discredit on the department, and 4) unlawful use of a weapon for fatally shooting Jones and inattention to duty, and incompetence, for improperly firing his weapon into a home occupied by a person who would be at risk of injury or death, and 5) incompetence for failing to re-qualify to carry a Taser.

=== CPD Officer Rialmo dismissed ===
The CPD’s Eddie Johnson, who supported Rialmo for months, now reinforced the Chicago Police Board's decision to terminate Rialmo. After relentless investigations, Eddie Johnson also embraced the decision by the Chicago Police Board, voting unanimously on October 17, 2019 to dismiss Officer Robert Rialmo over the 2015 shootings. The board contended that it was a matter of dispute as to what happened when Rialmo arrived at the LeGrier home. LeGrier’s family claims Rialmo retreated several feet off the front porch and was in no immediate physical danger, but the LeGriers were behind a barricaded bedroom door and could not corroborate their earlier statements. Rialmo continued to claims that LeGrier swung the bat within inches of his head. Experts who offered their opinions contradicted one another. The superintendent eventually backed the Rialmo ruling by the Chicago Police Board.

== Impact ==
=== Mayor Emanuel retires ===
The shooting of Quintonio LeGrier and Bettie Jones came on the heels of the murder of Laquan McDonald, which not only furthered the dismissal of Chicago Police Officer Robert Rialmo, but the demise of the mayor of Chicago, Rahm Emanuel. The shakeup from the prior high-profile murder of Laquan McDonald ended in the firing of Garry McCarthy as superintendent of police, the establishment of the CPATF, and the ousting of Anita Alvarez as State's Attorney. The shooting of Quintonio LeGrier and Bettie Jones occurred prior to the step-down of Mayor Rahm Emanuel and his decision not to seek re-election for Mayor of Chicago. On December 28, 2015, Emanuel announced that he was cutting short his Cuban vacation to "deal with the crisis." Since Officer Rialmo had testified that his Taser licensing was out-of-date and therefore was not armed with a Taser on the night of the LeGrier shooting, Emanuel announced several major changes to the Chicago police department on December 30, 2015, such as "doubling the number of Tasers issued to officers." Continued press assaults on Emanuel, such as the use of body-cams and the uncovering of hidden emails from the McDonald shooting, only served to fuel the media. The New Yorker's article on Emanuel only added to the already negative national media attention surrounding the mayor. More importantly, Emanuel's public opinion polls regarding his popularity in Chicago fell. Emanuel's decision not to seek re-election followed. The CPATF continues to augment the already recommended establishment of a smart 911 system for emergency responders, allowing residents to pre-enter information on mental health or other behavioral issues and to expand the crisis intervention team for CPD and other first responders. Additionally, the CPATF released a statement saying it “respects the Chicago Police Board's decision to terminate Mr. Robert Rialmo following its objective and thorough investigation into the 2015 officer-involved shooting resulting in the deaths of Quintonio LeGrier and Bettie Jones.”

=== Dismissal of Superintendent Eddie T. Johnson ===
On October 17, 2019, the same night as the Rialmo dismissal and after addressing the media, Eddie Johnson was found slumped over the steering wheel of his car by CPD. Johnson explained that he was out with a group of friends for dinner and admitted that he passed out in his vehicle with the engine running. Although Johnson has had health troubles during his nearly four years as superintendent, which included a kidney transplant by his son, a CPD officer, he was not concerned about an investigation into the incident by the city inspector general's office. The responding CPD officers allowed Johnson to drive home on his own volition without a field sobriety test, inciting controversy of usurping proper police protocol, which Johnson had accused Rialmo of doing the night of the LeGrier/Jones shooting. Johnson later admitted to Mayor Lori Lightfoot he had been drinking alcohol before he fell asleep at the wheel of his city-owned SUV. A week later, Johnson boycotted President Trump's speech at the International Association of Chiefs of Police conference in Chicago on October 27, 2019. Trump called Johnson's values and his absence a "disgrace." Johnson said he would not attend the conference "while racial insults and hatred are cast from the Oval Office." Johnson conceded that the past four years had been "trying" and planned to call a news conference for his timely departure from the CPD. On November 7, 2019, Johnson called a news conference announcing his retirement, and said it was “time for someone else to pin these four stars to their shoulders.” Johnson hoped to remain at his post until the end of 2019. Retired Los Angeles police Chief Charlie Beck was appointed as Chicago's interim police superintendent by Mayor Lori Lightfoot as the successor to Eddie Johnson. On December 2, 2019, Superintendent Johnson was unexpectedly dismissed two weeks before he was ready to retire, ending a tumultuous term as chief of the CPD. Mayor Lightfoot said that "Eddie Johnson intentionally misled me."
