= Eddie T. Johnson =

Former Superintendent of Chicago Police Department

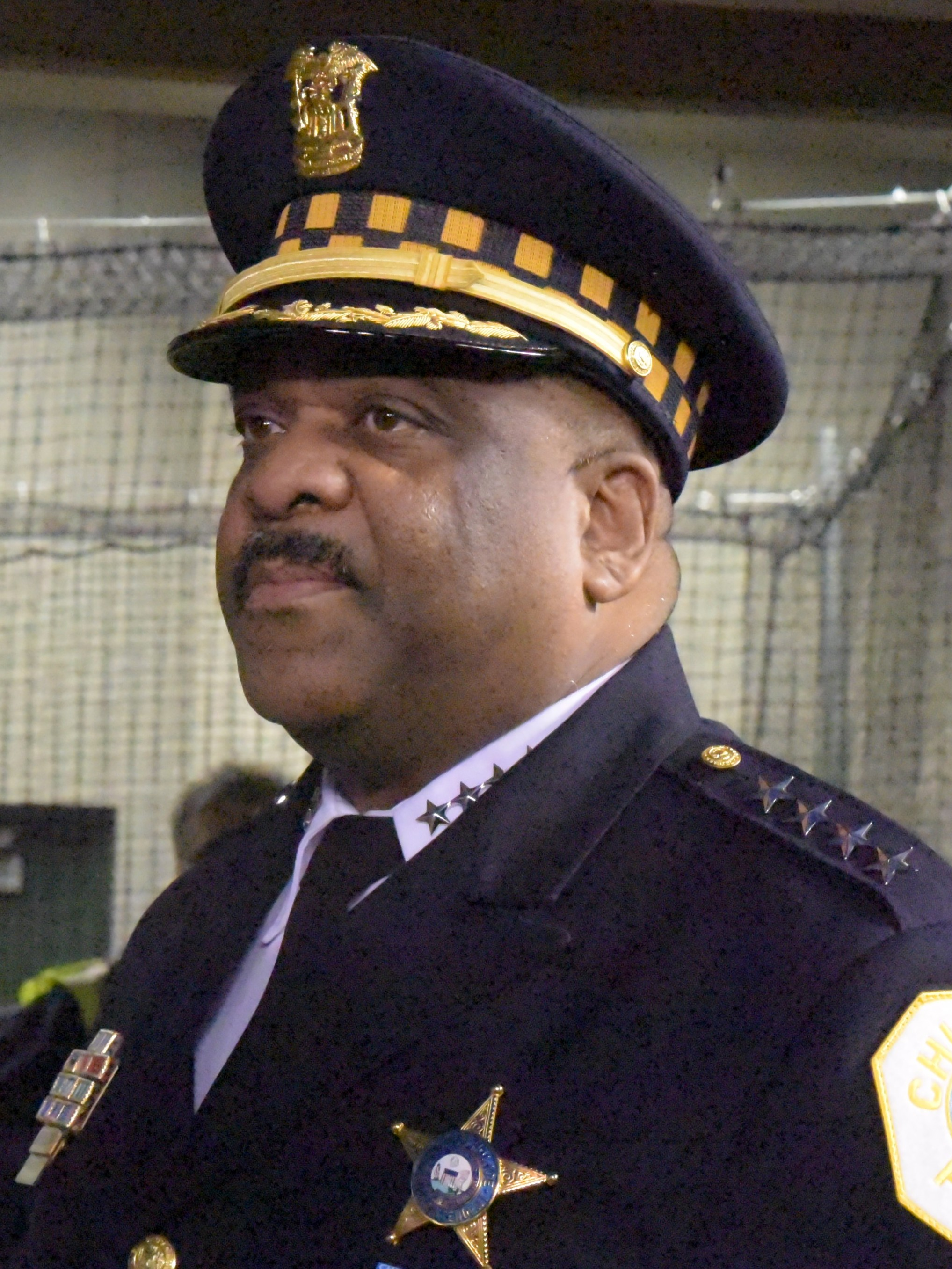
- Johnson in 2016

62nd Superintendent of the Chicago Police Department
- In office March 28, 2016 – December 2, 2019; Interim: March 28 – April 13, 2016
- Appointed by: Rahm Emanuel
- Preceded by: John Escalante (interim)
- Succeeded by: Charlie Beck (interim)

Personal details
- Born: July 28, 1960 (age 65) Chicago, Illinois, U.S.
- Children: 3
- Profession: Police officer; superintendent
- Police career
- Allegiance: United States
- Department: Chicago Police Department
- Service years: 1988–2019
- Status: Terminated for cause
- Rank: Superintendent (2016–2019) Chief of the Patrol Bureau (2012–16) Commander, 6th District (2008-12)

Eddie T. Johnson (born July 28, 1960) is an American retired police officer for the Chicago Police Department. He served as the 62nd Superintendent of the Chicago Police Department from March 2016 until December 2019.

== Early life and education ==
Johnson was born on the Near North Side of Chicago, Illinois, in the Cabrini–Green Homes public housing complex. Johnson recalls his mother telling his father about the new neighborhood as a "Quiet place, compared to the old neighborhood" and that Johnson recalled, "Gunshots all night long" while living in Cabrini–Green. At age 10, his family relocated to the Washington Heights neighborhood. He later attended Corliss High School, graduating in 1978.

== Career ==
=== Patrolman ===
Johnson began his career in the Chicago Police Department in 1988 as a patrol officer. He was appointed Commander of the 6th CPD District in 2008, and CPD Chief of Patrol in 2012.

=== Interim Superintendent ===
Chicago Mayor Rahm Emanuel endured controversy when appointing Johnson as his interim superintendent in 2016 considering Johnson was not one of the three finalists selected by the Chicago Police Board. Johnson did not apply for the job out of respect for Deputy Interim Superintendent John Escalante. Emanuel named Johnson as the Interim Police Chief on March 28, 2016.

=== Superintendent ===
On April 13, 2016, a day after the Chicago City Council Public Safety Committee bypassed the Chicago Police Board with a fast-track vote, Johnson was officially sworn in as Chicago Police Superintendent after his nomination was approved unanimously by the Chicago City Council in a 50–0 vote.

=== Dismissal ===
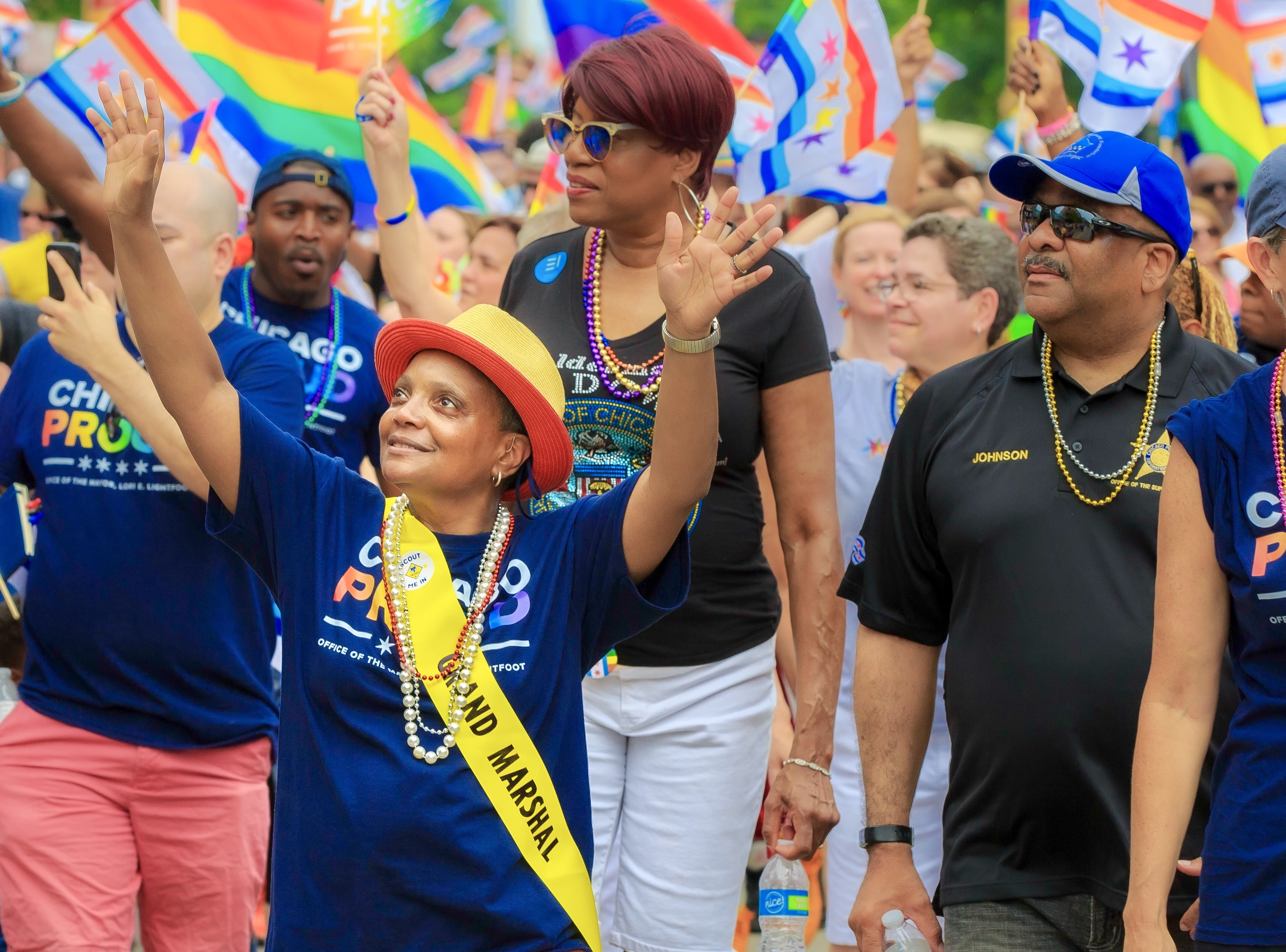
Johnson (right) accompanies Mayor Lori Lightfoot and others marching in the June 30, 2019 Chicago Pride Parade

On December 2, 2019, Chicago Mayor Lori Lightfoot terminated Johnson's employment with the City of Chicago for what she termed a "series of ethical lapses".

== Impact ==
Johnson led a department of over 13,400 officers, the second-largest police department in the United States, who defended use of force training, more community policing and a court monitor to oversee department-wide reforms which included the DOJ and the Chicago Police Accountability Task Force (CPATF). The CPATF was initiated by then Mayor of Chicago Rahm Emanuel to investigate the murder of Laquan McDonald and was once headed by the present Mayor Lori Lightfoot.

Johnson was appointed superintendent in 2016 by Emanuel to restore the public's trust after Emanuel delayed releasing the video of Jason Van Dyke's fatal shooting of Laquan McDonald for over a year. Johnson said that the Laquan McDonald incident changed Chicago's trust in the police department and that officer morale fell as a result of the lack of trust. Chicago's homicide rate stood at a 20-year high of 792 in 2016 when Johnson was appointed superintendent, and fell to 561 by the end of 2018. Johnson credited the use of data analytics to decrease homicides and shootings, and approved of the DOJ's investigation into CPD shootings that found widespread excessive use of force and racial discrimination by the CPD. It led to a consent decree, a federally enforced agreement that oversees CPD reforms.

As a result of the consent decree, Johnson validated the CPD's community policing efforts, making substantial improvements in officer training, which eventually led to a decrease in officer-related shootings.

== Controversies ==
Johnson's early support and ultimate reversal in the firing of Officer Robert Rialmo over the 2015 Christmas shooting of Quintonio LeGrier and accidental death of Bettie Jones continued to shadow his term in office as superintendent. Another controversy linked to Johnson was the high-profile case against actor Jussie Smollett, who was accused of staging a fake hate crime on Chicago's North Side. Smollett was charged with a crime for the plan and execution of a hoax and abusing CPD's resources and manpower. However, the charges were subsequently dropped by State's Attorney Kim Foxx, enraging Johnson as well as Mayor Emanuel.

=== Embroilment with Donald Trump ===
Johnson defied collaborating with the U.S. Federal government's efforts to round-up illegal immigrants as a sanctuary city, embroiling Johnson with newly elected President Donald Trump. Trump in turn traded words with Johnson, who criticised Chicago officials over their mishandling of the city's high crime rate. In October 2019, Johnson refused to attend a speech by Trump at the International Association of Chiefs of Police that took place in Chicago, a move supported by Mayor Lori Lightfoot. Trump called Johnson's absence a "disgrace." Johnson called Trump's words frivolous and stated that he "would not attend the conference while racial insults and hatred are cast from the Oval Office." Mayor Lori Lightfoot said, "Superintendent Johnson showed President Trump what true leadership and character look like."

=== Retirement from the Chicago Police Department ===
On November 7, 2019, Johnson announced his intention to retire from the Chicago Police Department (CPD). Johnson's retirement announcement, effective at the end of 2019, followed an incident where police officers had found Johnson asleep in his city-owned vehicle on October 17, 2019. Johnson later told Mayor Lightfoot that he had consumed alcohol earlier that evening, requesting an internal investigation into the incident, to which Johnson expressed that he was "not concerned" about the outcome.

On November 8, 2019, Mayor Lightfoot appointed retired Los Angeles police chief Charlie Beck as the city's interim superintendent. On December 2, 2019, Mayor Lightfoot terminated Johnson's superintendent contract for cause, effective immediately, indicating that he had misrepresented the reason why he was sleeping in his vehicle; however, Johnson remained an employee of the CPD, as the Mayor's action was technically a demotion.

On December 4, 2019, he chose to accept retirement under his career service position as lieutenant, which completely severed his relationship with the CPD.

=== Lawsuit over sexual assault and sexual harassment ===
On October 15, 2020, CPD officer Cynthia Donald sued Johnson for sexual assault and harassment. On March 20, 2024, U.S. District Judge Elaine Bucklo dismissed Donald's lawsuit against both Johnson and the city of Chicago without going to trial, writing that “The basic problem with Donald’s claim is that virtually all the evidence of her conduct suggests that she welcomed and was an active participant in her relationship with Johnson."

== Personal life ==
Johnson currently resides in the near South Side neighborhood of Bridgeport. Johnson is divorced, a father of three children, one of whom is a CPD patrolman. He was remarried to a CPD officer in 2017. Johnson had congenital kidney disease for most of his adult life. His son, CPD patrolman Daniel Johnson, gave him one of his kidneys in 2017. Both Johnsons support Illinois' organ donation program, and were honored by the National Kidney Foundation with an award at its 2019 Gift of Life Gala.
