= List of killings by law enforcement officers in the United States, October 2014 =

This is a list of people reported killed by non-military law enforcement officers in the United States in October 2014, whether in the line of duty or not, and regardless of reason or method. The listing documents the occurrence of a death, making no implications regarding wrongdoing or justification on the part of the person killed or officer involved. Killings are arranged by date of the incident that caused death. Different death dates, if known, are noted in the description. The table below lists 62 people.

== October 2014 ==
Date	Name (Age) of Deceased	Race	State (City)	Description
2014-10-31	Jaime Garcia (35)	Hispanic	California (Salinas)	When officers arrived, they contacted Jaime Garcia, 35, who became combative. During the struggle, one officer used his Taser on Garcia who continued to resist. It became apparent to officers Garcia was going into medical distress and paramedics, who were staged nearby, were summoned. Garcia was taken to a local hospital with CPR in progress but was pronounced dead at the hospital.
2014-10-31	Kolata, John (75)		Arkansas (Leslie)	The gunman involved in a Leslie shooting earlier this month died on Friday.
2014-10-29	Chauvin, Jennifer (33)		New York (Au Sable)	Thirty-three-year-old Jennifer Chauvin was traveling North on Grove Street around 7 a.m. Wednesday morning when a State Police SUV collided with her car.
2014-10-29	Roger Shipton (49)	White	California (Suisun City)	Suisun City police officers shot and killed a man who threatened them with a gun at his home, agency officials said Wednesday.
2014-10-29	Robert Vercher (26)	White	Louisiana (Natchitoches)	Around 3 p.m. officers were alerted to a shooting at the Holy Cross Catholic Church on Second St. According to Natchitoches City Police, the initial investigation revealed that two Natchitoches Parish Sheriffs Deputies were at the location to serve a protective order on a subject there. Police said shortly after the deputies located the subject, gunshots were exchanged, and the subject was hit several times.
2014-10-28	William Chad Mattingly (38)	White	Kentucky (Louisville)	The suspect was identified as 38-year-old William Chad Mattingly. The coroner, Rita Taylor, said Mattingly's cause of death was multiple gunshot wounds.
2014-10-28	Angel Frescas (22)	Hispanic	Arizona (Phoenix)	Inmate Angel Frescas, 22, died hours after being shot in the head by a Maricopa County detention officer, according to the Sheriff's Office.
2014-10-28	Jeremy Martin (29)	White	New Mexico (Las Cruces)	Sheriff's deputy Jeremy Martin was allegedly shot in the back and arms several times and killed by a fellow deputy at a hotel room. The shooting apparently occurred after a heated argument. Deputy Tai Chan was booked in jail and charged with murder, and is being held without bail.
2014-10-28	Kaldrick Donald (24)	Black	Florida (Gretna)	
2013-10-27	John Wesley Helvie (44)	White	Florida (Hialeah)	
2014-10-26	Shaun Wilson Ramo (36)	White	Louisiana (Bayou Pigeon)	A man was fatally shot by at least one Iberville Parish deputy Friday (Oct. 24) evening in Bayou Pigeon after a team of up to 14 officers swarmed a house at the scene of rape investigation, according to Iberville Parish Sheriff Brett Stassi.
2014-10-26	Jeffrey Holden Jr. (18)	White	Kansas (Wichita)	An 18-year-old gang associate is dead after getting into a shootout with police
2014-10-25	Craig Hall (29)	Black	Illinois (Maywood)	A West Side man was shot to death by police in west suburban Maywood after officers allegedly witnessed a drug deal early Saturday.
2014-10-25	Daniel Walsh (27)	White	California (Huntington Beach)	A man armed with a handgun was fatally shot by a police officer in Huntington Beach on Saturday, officials said.
2014-10-24	Richard Scheuermann III (39)	White	Pennsylvania (Easton)	Drunk, Scheuermann wrecked his truck on a utility pole, then backed it "multiple times" into a Palmer Township police cruiser, authorities said. Initially police believed Scheuermann then committed suicide by cutting his throat prior to being shot at six times, but in December, Northampton County District Attorney John Morganelli announced that a police bullet was the cause of death.
2014-10-24	Trevor Silvia (34)	White	Florida (Edgewater)	
2014-10-23	Cesar Javier Cepeda (27)	Hispanic	Texas (Brownsville)	During a pursuit, Cepeda charged at law enforcement officers with an axe that led them to fatally shoot him, according to authorities.
2014-10-23	Luis Roman (25)	Hispanic	Massachusetts (Dartmouth)	A fatal police-involved shooting in Dartmouth Thursday night is under investigation, Bristol County District Attorney Sam Sutter said.
2014-10-23	Jeremy Bustos (43)	Hispanic	Arizona (Avondale)	Avondale police fatally shot a man Thursday morning after he rammed a patrol car while driving a stolen truck then got out of the vehicle with a machete.
2014-10-23	Zale Thompson (32)	Black	New York (Jamaica, Queens)	Police in New York say an axe attack on two officers was a terrorist act carried out by a radicalised Muslim convert. Thompson was shot dead after wounding the two officers, one critically, in Queens on Thursday. Commissioner William Bratton said Thompson was not on any watch lists but had browsed al-Qaeda web sites and watched beheadings. A bystander shot in the incident by a police bullet is now in stable condition in hospital after surgery.
2014-10-21	Jose Calzada (35)	Hispanic	Utah (Roy)	Negotiation with the Roy man ultimately failed and shots were fired by members of the SWAT team, police say. The man succumbed to his injuries at 11:15 am. Police identified the man Wednesday as 35-year-old Jose Calzada.
2014-10-20	Gary Elmo Lee (54)	Unknown race	Virginia (Colonial Heights)	Police tried to negotiate with Lee for more than an hour. That's when investigators say he began making threatening gestures at the officer and one of the Hopewell officers shot and killed him. There is no word yet on what kind of gestures they were.
2014-10-20	Laquan McDonald (17)	Black	Illinois (Chicago)	See main article: Murder of Laquan McDonald
2014-10-20	Julian Magdaleno (29)	Hispanic	Texas (Bellmead)	A 29-year-old burglary suspect is dead after officers shot him, after a stun gun failed to subdue the man Monday morning in Bellmead.
2014-10-20	Marco Antonio Perez (22)	Hispanic	Texas (El Paso)	El Paso Police have released the identity of the man killed Monday morning in an officer-involved shooting. His name is Marco Antonio Perez, 22, of El Paso.
2014-10-20	Ricardo de Jesus Barrera (54)	Hispanic	Florida (Ocala)	
2014-10-18	Tom Rook (38)	White	Mississippi (Southaven)	Family members are mourning Sunday night after Southaven, Mississippi deputies shot and killed a Memphis man.
2014-10-18	Tarrell Lucas (22)	Black	Indiana (Indianapolis)	Terrell Lucas, 22, was one of three armed men who tried to rob the Gamestop in the 3700 block of South East Street about 9:15 p.m. Saturday, police said.
2014-10-17	Adam Ardett Madison (28)	Black	Alabama (Warrior)	Authorities today identified a man fatally shot by a Warrior police officer on Friday.
2014-10-16	Hoke, Dennis (42)		Virginia (Staunton)	The trooper shot and killed Dennis Hoke Jr, age 42, of Waynesboro, on Interstate 64 between Staunton and Fishersville.
2014-10-14	Jian, Ye Hua (32)		Connecticut (Norwalk)	32-year-old New York City resident Ye Hua Jian stabbed and injured two passengers on a bus from Chinatown, NYC bound to the Mohegan Sun casino. The bus driver then stopped near Interstate 95 and flagged down a trooper at a construction site. The trooper allegedly demanded Jian to drop his weapon, but he refused. The trooper then fired on the suspect, fatally wounding him. Another person received minor injuries from a bullet ricocheting off pavement from the officer's gun.
2014-10-13	Jerry Leon Hermes Jr. (35)	White	Texas (New Braunfels)	A New Braunfels man wanted in the death of his 32-year-old wife was shot and killed Monday in Guadalupe County during a standoff with members of the U.S. Marshal Service's Lone Star Fugitive Task Force.
2014-10-13	Freddie Cooper (36)	White	Oklahoma (Spiro)	A man was fatally shot by a LeFlore County sheriff's deputy after he reportedly pointed a gun at officers during a hostage situation, the Oklahoma State Bureau of Investigation announced Monday night.
2014-10-13	Garcia, Macario (54)		Texas (Pleasanton)	The family says the deputy used his taser twice on Garcia during the confrontation.
2014-10-12	Ronald "Ronnieman" Johnson (25)	Black	Illinois (South Side, Chicago)	Officer George Hernandez shot and killed armed African-American man Ronald Johnson III on October 12, 2014. On December 7, 2015, Cook County State's Attorney Anita Alvarez announced that Hernandez would not face charges for the shooting.
2014-10-12	Sloyan, Michelle (49)		Tennessee (Bartlett)	Danny Floyd, 63, was driving a grey car when a Bartlett officer driving a police cruiser crashed into his car. Floyd was turning south onto Bartlett Boulevard from Stage Road. He and Michelle D. Sloyan, 49, who was riding with Floyd, both died from injuries sustained in the crash.
2014-10-12	Floyd, Danny (63)		Tennessee (Bartlett)	Danny Floyd, 63, was driving a grey car when a Bartlett officer driving a police cruiser crashed into his car. Floyd was turning south onto Bartlett Boulevard from Stage Road. He and Michelle D. Sloyan, 49, who was riding with Floyd, both died from injuries sustained in the crash.
2014-10-12	John C. Carr (20)	Black	Florida (Tampa)	
2014-10-12	Jack Jacquez Jr. (27)	Hispanic	Colorado (Rocky Ford)	Jack Jacquez was fatally shot by Officer James Ashby during an incident at Jacquez's home. Jacquez allegedly had a skateboard in his hands when he was shot. On November 14, 2014, Ashby was charged with second-degree murder in Jacquez's death, and he turned himself in at the police station he is employed at. Ashby has been released from jail on bail.
2014-10-12	Alan Gillotti Sr. (52)	White	Maine (Ludlow)	A man was shot to death by police Sunday at his home in Ludlow, Maine, during an investigation into an armed home invasion.
2014-10-11	Elisha Paul Glass (20)	Black	Ohio (Columbus)	Twenty-year-old Elisha Glass and 18-year-old Qusean Whitten died in a police-involved shooting out of a robbery at a Dollar General last Friday night, according to the Columbus Division of Police.
2014-10-11	Qusean Whitten (18)	Black	Ohio (Columbus)	Twenty-year-old Elisha Glass and 18-year-old Qusean Whitten died in a police-involved shooting out of a robbery at a Dollar General last Friday night, according to the Columbus Division of Police.
2014-10-10	Frank R. Kerr (40)	White	Arizona (Tucson)	An officer-involved shooting at 10th Avenue and 38th Street has police investigating on this Friday morning. South Tucson Police tell us that a suspect is dead and the officer was not injured.
2014-10-09	William Thomas Holt (51)	White	Minnesota (Minneapolis)	Authorities have identified the man who was shot to death by police officers at an RV park in St. Anthony last week as William Thomas Holt, 51, of Ellaville, Ga.
2014-10-08	Miguel Reyes (20)	Hispanic	New Jersey (Paramus)	Authorities said the driver, identified as 20-year-old Miguel Reyes of Manhattan, was taken to the hospital where he was pronounced dead.
2014-10-08	Jason Rogers (35)	White	Oklahoma (Tulsa)	Tulsa police said they shot and killed an armed suspect near 16th and Memorial.
2014-10-08	Ymauo Erwin (41)	Native Hawaiian or Pacific Islander	Missouri (Kansas City)	Police said he was brandishing a sword-like item when an officer shot him.
2014-10-08	VonDerrit D. Myers Jr. (18)	Black	Missouri (St. Louis)	During a foot pursuit, Myers fired three rounds at the officer. The officer returned fire, killing Myers.
2014-10-08	Reginald Owens (34)	Black	Alabama (Huntsville)	Man shot, killed by police in Madison County Jail parking lot after allegedly ramming barricade, attacking officer with knife. .
2014-10-07	Aljarreau Cross (29)	Black	Nevada (North Las Vegas)	Police say the suspect fired his gun at officers, with both officers returning gunfire. The suspect was killed on scene.
2014-10-07	O'Shaine Evans (26)	Black	California (San Francisco)	An auto burglar suspect was shot to death by a police officer near Oracle Park, after allegedly pointing a handgun at police. A second suspect was shot and wounded.
2014-10-07	Armondo Ochoa (36)	Hispanic	Texas (Houston)	Houston SWAT officers shot and killed a man during the rescue of his estranged wife following a three-hour stand off in which he held her hostage in his SUV.
2014-10-06	Michael Abney (36)	Black	District of Columbia (Washington)	Abney was killed inside anapartment Police said D.C. officers and U.S. marshals were trying to arrest him on a warrant charging him with assault with a deadly weapon. Police said Abney had a gun and refused to comply with orders to drop it. D.C. police said one member of the Marshals Service and one police officer fired at Abney. He was pronounced dead at the scene from several gunshots.
2014-10-04	Johnny Martinez (29)	Hispanic	California (Los Angeles)	Officials said Martinez was assaulting another man. After using a Taser and pepper spray on Martinez, officers attempted to handcuff him. When he pulled a knife on the officers, he was shot.
2014-10-03	Lashano J. Gilbert (31)	Black	Connecticut (New London)	"Police say Gilbert was in an altered state of mind and acting aggressive, forcing them to deploy a Taser." Officers attempted to take away a makeshift noose he was fashioning in his cell. When officers opened the cell door, he escaped, and began assaulting officers in the common area when he was Tasered the second time. Jail hospital staff were unable to revive him.
2014-10-03	Carl Blossomgame (48)	Black	California (San Bernardino)	San Bernardino officers responded to a woman's call about a man attempting to break into her room and threatening her. When officers arrived, Blossomgame refused to comply and was tasered but without effect. Officers gave pursuit when Blossomgame fled and three officers attempted to wrestle him to the ground. During the struggle, Blossomgame pulled one of the officer's holster free and was shot by another officer.
2014-10-03	Miguel Benton (19)	Black	Georgia (DeKalb)	Benton got DeKalb police officer Phil Cristy's gun and shot him in the thigh and wrist, according to DeKalb police officer Eddie Stubbs, who then shot and killed Benton, who they were escorting from court to jail.
2014-10-03	Denis Volchkin (28)	White	New York (Brooklyn)	New York Police officers were called a second time to stop an argument between a man and his mother. Officers found Volchkin sitting on his mother's couch and refused to drop his knives as he charged at the police officers. Unidentified officers shot him.
2014-10-03	Rose, Michael Daryle (49)		Arizona (Flagstaff)	Rose called 911, explaining his history of paranoia and hypertension. Officers used a Taser on Rose when he fought with them after refusing to get in an ambulance. He died in a jail holding cell.
2014-10-02	Larry Allen Miller (69)	Unknown race	Virginia (Christiansburg)	Christiansburg Police Department and a Montgomery County sheriff's deputy "engaged the man" when called to "a domestic situation reportedly involving a firearm." Miller was shot and killed when he exited his home and pointed a gun at the responding officers.
2014-10-01	Ryan Kyle Champ (34)	White	Texas (Houston)	Three Pearland Police Department officers and a Houston Police officer shot and killed a man who shot at them with a shotgun and handgun.
2014-10-01	Tracy Ann Oglesby Wade (39)	Black	Kentucky (Louisville)	Wade was shot and killed in her home following an 8-hour stand-off and when she pointed a firearm at officers Sgt. Eric Culver, Sgt. Paul Humphrey, Officer Brad Harris and Detective Michael Simpson, who were serving her a warrant for probation violations.

== See also ==
- Death in custody § United States
- Henry A. Wallace Police Crime Public Database
- List of cases of police brutality
- List of countries with annual rates and counts for killings by law enforcement officers
- List of law enforcement officers killed in the line of duty in the United States
- List of law enforcement officers convicted for an on-duty killing in the United States
- List of shootings by US immigration agents
- List of police reforms related to the George Floyd protests
- List of unarmed African Americans killed by law enforcement officers in the United States
- Lists of killings by law enforcement officers
- Police brutality in the United States
- Police misconduct § United States
- Police riot § United States
- Police use of deadly force in the United States
