= Deborah Witzburg =

American Inspector General and attorney

Inspector General of the City of Chicago
- In office April 27, 2022 – April 24, 2026
- Preceded by: Joseph Ferguson

Personal details
- Education: Brown University (BA); Northwestern University School of Law (JD)

Deborah Witzburg is an American attorney and public servant. She served as the fourth Inspector General of the City of Chicago from 2022 to 2026. She was the first woman to serve as Inspector General for Chicago.

== Early life and education ==
Witzburg graduated from Brown University in 2005 with a Bachelor of Arts degree in Anthropology.

Planning to specialize in criminal law in the public interest, she later received a JD from Northwestern University School of Law.

== Career ==
After graduating from the Northwestern School of Law, she began working at the Cook County State's Attorney's Office. As an Assistant State's Attorney, she prosecuted misdemeanor and felony cases and served in the State's Attorney's Community Justice Center.

=== City of Chicago Office of the Inspector General ===
In 2016, Witzburg joined the City of Chicago's Office of the Inspector General (OIG) as an Assistant Inspector General in the wake of the murder of Laquan McDonald by a Chicago police officer. She then served as the city's first public safety inspector general, a position that was created as one of a number of reforms instituted as a result of the murder of Laquan McDonald. In that role, she led the public safety section of the OIG as they published a number of audits and reports that were critical of the Chicago Police Department (CPD) and former mayor Lori Lightfoot.

=== Inspector General ===
In November of 2021 after former Inspector General (IG) Joseph Ferguson stepped down, Witzburg resigned from her role as deputy inspector for public safety with the intention of seeking the job of IG. Mayor Lori Lightfoot selected her for the role in March of 2022, and in April the Chicago City Council unanimously approved her appointment. She is a Certified Inspector General by the Association of Inspectors General.

==== Notable investigations ====
In her tenure as IG, Witzburg led many investigations on sitting elected officials. In July of 2023, she found that Mayor Lightfoot violated Chicago's ethics ordinance when her campaign team emailed city employees asking them to contribute to her campaign. This finding was later dismissed by the Chicago Board of Ethics. She also found that Alderman Jim Gardiner retaliated against a critic of his by directing a city employee to issue unfounded citations. Per officials, the finding against Gardiner was the "first-ever finding of probable cause in an inspector general ethics investigation of a sitting member of City Council," although the case was later dismissed by an Administrative Law judge who found that her office had failed to turn over potentially exculpatory evidence.

===== Brandon Johnson administration =====
Witzburg's office publicly clashed with Mayor Brandon Johnson's administration. She accused the city's Department of Law of hindering her offices' investigations, which led to the passage of a 2025 ethics reform ordinance restricting when the Department of Law can attend investigative interviews conducted by the OIG. In one report, she detailed her office's investigation into the mayor's "gift room" and his staff's efforts to hinder that investigation. That report led to the mayor opening that room up to the public as Witzburg had demanded. In another report, she detailed her recommendation that a top mayoral staffer, later identified as senior advisor Jason Lee, be fired for an alleged quid pro quo threat against Alderman Bill Conway, a recommendation that the mayor rejected.

Under her leadership, the OIG became the first city department to reach full compliance with the consent decree, a federal court order requiring CPD to stop violating residents' constitutional rights. Her office also embarked on a series of listening tours to understand the concerns of Chicago residents and to inform her priorities as IG.

Witzburg had declared her intent to seek a second term as IG but shortly after changed her mind, stating she had "done what I came here to do."

=== Illinois Attorney General's Office ===
After the conclusion of her term as Inspector General, Attorney General of Illinois Kwame Raoul announced Witzburg would serve as his Chief of Staff.

== Personal life ==
Witzburg is married to Jay Biedler and has two children. She is a lifelong Boston Red Sox fan.
