= Imminent peril =

Certain danger, immediate, and impending

Imminent peril, or imminent danger, is an American legal concept that defines the term as "certain danger, immediate, and impending; menacingly close at hand, and threatening." In many states in the US, a mere necessity for quick action does not constitute an emergency within the doctrine of imminent peril, where the situation calling for the action is one which should reasonably have been anticipated and which the person whose action is called for should have been prepared to meet; the doctrine of imminent peril does not excuse one who has brought about the peril by their own negligence.

== Legislation ==
In California, legislation authorizes a person to use deadly force to defend against death or serious injury if they believe they are in imminent peril. Raymond L. Middleton, Warden v. Sally Marie McNeil is a California case that espouses this doctrine. The 2012 Florida Statutes lay measurable conditions to determine if the "fear of imminent peril" is reasonable under the law. Both the International Court of Justice (ICJ) and the International Law Commission (ILC) have recognized the profound motivations of one's lawful fear of imminent peril and have adopted measures to define consequences, of self-defense against such peril, as reasonable.

== Peril ==
Peril is synonymous with danger but lacks the suddenness of the "imminent" qualifier. The Occupational Safety and Health Administration (OSHA) regulates safety standards for workplaces in the United States. Its charter obligation is to identify dangerous conditions in the workplace with a potential for sudden peril, and to require employers to actively mitigate the risks.

== See also ==
- Castle doctrine
- Good Samaritan law
- Emergency exception
- Exigent circumstance
- Necessity in Canadian law
- Rescue doctrine
