= Murder of Laquan McDonald =

2014 police murder of a black teenager in Chicago, Illinois, United States

- Van Dyke (left) moments before fatally shooting McDonald (right)
- Location: 41°49′04.7″N 87°43′26.4″W; 4100 South Pulaski Road, Chicago, Illinois, U.S.
- Date: October 20, 2014; 12 years ago 9:57:36–9:57:54 p.m. (CDT)
- Attack type: Murder, police brutality, shooting
- Weapon: 9mm semi-automatic firearm
- Victim: Laquan Joseph McDonald
- Perpetrator: Jason D. Van Dyke
- Charges: First-degree murder (six counts); Aggravated battery (16 counts); Official misconduct
- Verdict: Guilty on the less serious conviction of second-degree murder due to perceived mitigating factors; Guilty on all counts of aggravated battery with a firearm; Not guilty of official misconduct
- Convictions: Second-degree murder, aggravated battery with a firearm (16 counts)
- Sentence: 6 3/4 years in prison (served 3 1/4 years)
- Litigation: Lawsuit against the city of Chicago settled with McDonald's family for $5 million

On October 20, 2014, in Chicago, Illinois, Laquan McDonald, a 17-year-old boy, was murdered by Chicago Police officer Jason Van Dyke. Police had initially reported that McDonald was behaving erratically while walking down the street, refusing to put down a knife, and that he had lunged at officers. Preliminary internal police reports described the incident similarly, leading to the shooting being judged as justifiable, and Van Dyke not being charged at the time. This was later disproved after a video of the encounter was released, showing that McDonald was walking away from Van Dyke at the time.

The video of the shooting was initially withheld from the public for more than a year, a delay which later sparked criticism. On November 24, 2015, thirteen months after the shooting, a court ordered the police to release a dash cam video of the shooting. It showed that McDonald was walking away from the police when he was shot 16 times by Officer Van Dyke. That same day, Van Dyke was charged with first-degree murder, and was initially held without bail at the Cook County Jail. He was released on bail on November 30. The city reached a settlement with McDonald's family for $5 million in April 2015. On October 5, 2018, Van Dyke was found guilty of second-degree murder, as well as 16 counts of aggravated battery with a firearm. Van Dyke was sentenced to prison in January 2019 and was released early for good behavior in February 2022.

Protests followed the murder of McDonald, criticizing the lack of transparency from the Rahm Emanuel administration, demanding changes in police and judicial procedures and police oversight, and for the dismissal or resignation of city and county officials including the mayor. For several months, Emanuel had claimed that making the video public would jeopardize a federal investigation into the shooting and had resisted allowing the video to be shown to the public; however, the Justice Department never raised any issues with the public release of the footage. Rahm Emanuel had already won a second term in 2015 as Mayor of Chicago (prior to the release of the dash cam video), but Cook County State's Attorney Anita Alvarez lost her bid for reelection in 2016.

At the request of Illinois Attorney General Lisa Madigan, the United States Department of Justice initiated a civil rights investigation into McDonald's murder and the activities of the Chicago Police Department. It released its report in January 2017, describing the police as having a culture of "excessive violence," especially against minority suspects, and of having poor training and supervision. DOJ and city officials signed a consent decree for a plan for improvement to be overseen by the courts. Moreover, three Chicago police officers were tried for allegedly attempting to cover up events related to the murder, and were found not guilty by the Cook County Circuit Court on January 17, 2019.

== Profiles ==
=== Laquan McDonald ===
Laquan McDonald

Laquan Joseph McDonald (September 25, 1997 – October 20, 2014) was from the 37th Ward of Chicago. According to NBC Chicago news, McDonald earned $1,100 working after school in the Youth Advocate Program in 2014. His final report card showed that he had earned an A in personal finance and music, a B in world studies and reading, and Cs in biology and algebra. He had a younger sister and brother. One of McDonald's teachers described him as "very respectful and reserved". The teacher added that McDonald "was not aggressive".

Toxicology reports later revealed that McDonald had PCP in his blood and urine at the time of the encounter with police. Defense expert pharmacologist James Thomas O'Donnell testified that the amount found was enough to suggest he had taken the drug on the day of the shooting, and that it could cause "significant bizarre behavior".

=== Jason Van Dyke ===
Jason D. Van Dyke (born c. 1978) was born in Hinsdale, Illinois, and graduated from Hinsdale South High School in 1996. He earned a bachelor's degree in criminal justice from St. Xavier University in Chicago. A 14-year veteran of the Chicago Police Department, Van Dyke is married and has two children. Since 2001, some 20 citizen complaints had been filed against Officer Van Dyke, but none resulted in disciplinary action.

Ten of the complaints allege he used excessive force, and two involve the use of a firearm. A jury awarded a Chicago man $350,000 after determining Van Dyke employed excessive force during a traffic stop. One complaint involved verbal abuse by Van Dyke, who was alleged to have used a racial slur. Van Dyke was involved in preparing questionable documentation of a separate shooting in 2005.

According to CNN, "the Chicago Police Department has about 12,000 officers. Like Van Dyke, 402 officers have 20 or more complaints on file in the database. The most complaints against any officer, according to the database, is 68. The database shows that of the 20 complaints against Van Dyke, none resulted in discipline. Five complaints in the database were "not sustained", five were unfounded, four resulted in exoneration, five had unknown outcomes, and one resulted in no action taken."

== Events ==
Shortly before 10:00 p.m., police were called to investigate McDonald at 4100 South Pulaski Road, responding to reports that he was carrying a knife and breaking into vehicles in a trucking yard at 41st Street and Kildare Avenue. When officers confronted McDonald, he used a knife with a 3-inch (7.6 cm) blade to slice the tire on a patrol vehicle and damage its windshield. McDonald walked away from police after numerous verbal instructions from officers to drop the knife, at which point responding officers requested Taser backup, according to radio recordings released December 30, 2015, to Politico and NBC Chicago in response to Illinois Freedom of Information Act requests.

Video of the murder shows that Van Dyke was advancing on McDonald, while McDonald was walking away from Van Dyke when the first shot was fired. The first shot hit McDonald, who spun and fell to the ground. As McDonald lay on the ground, still holding the knife, Van Dyke fired more shots into him.

In total, Van Dyke fired 16 shots at McDonald in 14–15 seconds, expending the maximum capacity of his 9mm semi-automatic firearm. Van Dyke was on the scene for less than 30 seconds before opening fire, and began shooting approximately six seconds after exiting his car. The first responding officer said that he did not see the need to use force, and none of the approximately eight other officers on the scene fired their weapons.

McDonald was taken to Mount Sinai Hospital, where he was pronounced dead at 10:42 p.m.

=== Initial police report ===
The initial police portrayals of the incident, consisting of about 400 pages of typed and handwritten reports, prompted police supervisors to rule the case a justifiable homicide and within the bounds of the department's use of force guidelines. The reports did not say how many times McDonald was shot, and said that McDonald was acting "crazed" and lunged at officers after refusing to drop his knife. Michael D. Robbins, one of the attorneys representing the McDonald estate, said his initial thoughts were that, "I didn't think there was a case if he had lunged at a police officer", adding, "The police narrative, without exception, is that the use of force is justified and necessary, which it sometimes is."

One police report described that McDonald "raised the knife across chest" and pointed it at Van Dyke. Van Dyke told investigators that he feared McDonald would rush him with the knife or throw it at him, and he also recalled a 2012 Police Department bulletin warning about a knife that was also capable of firing a bullet, as well as throwing knives and also spring-loaded knives capable of propelling the blade. One report noted that McDonald's knife, "was in the open position", but when announcing charges against Van Dyke, Cook County State's Attorney Anita Alvarez said that the knife was found folded at the scene.

=== Medical report ===
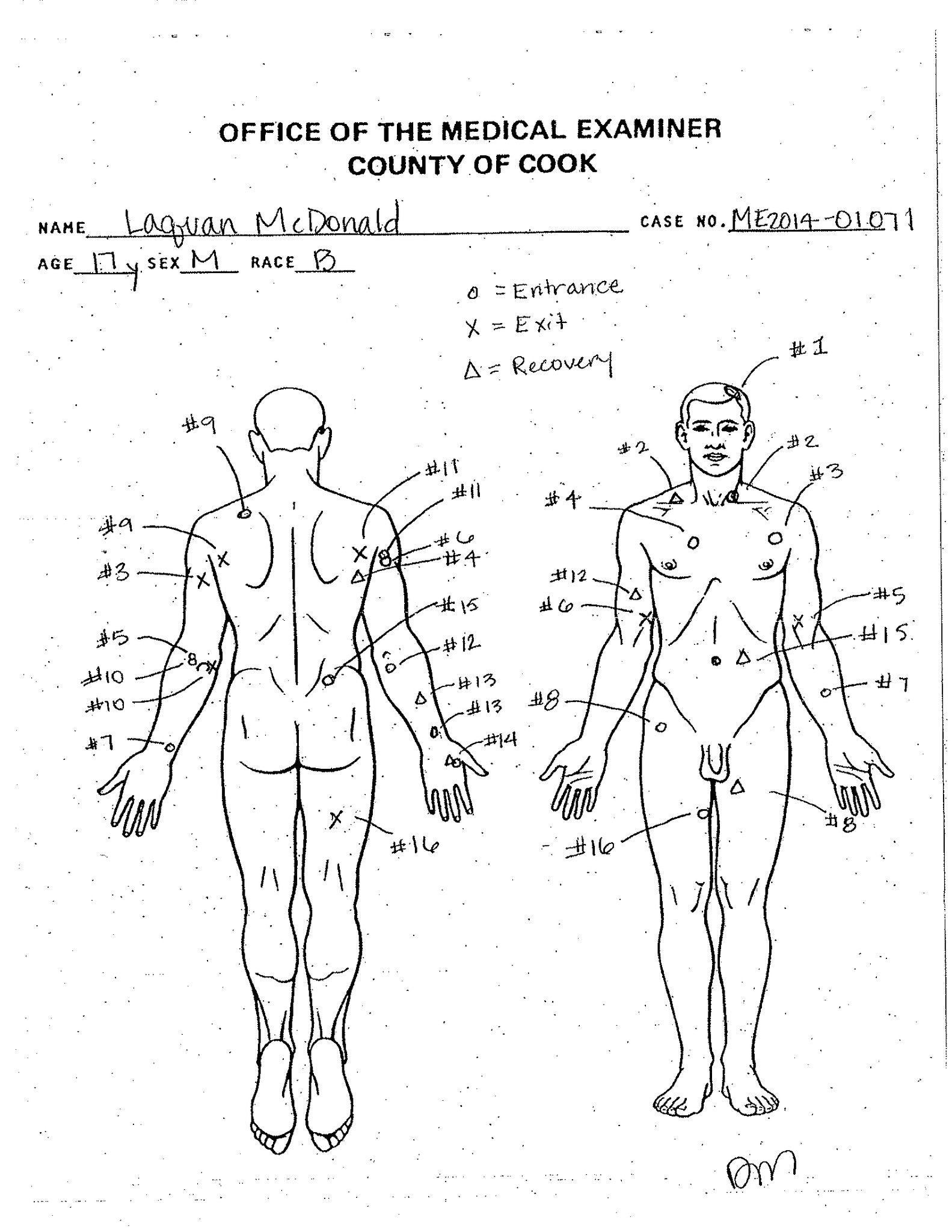
Diagram from McDonald's autopsy report

According to the Cook County Medical Examiner's Office's autopsy report, which was revealed by journalist Jamie Kalven through a public records request, McDonald was shot in his neck, chest, back, both arms, and right leg, and he also had a graze wound on his left scalp. Nine of the sixteen shots hit McDonald's back, and he was shot as he lay on the ground. His death was ruled a homicide.

=== Dash-cam video ===
Five police videos of the murder are known to exist, including the view from a camera mounted in the marked police SUV that Van Dyke was riding in as he and his partner responded to the scene. The videos show that at least eight police vehicles responded to the scene, but as of 2015 no video had been released from the other three vehicles. Chicago police officers are required to make sure that their video systems are working properly, and that they should "submit a ticket if they are unable to download digitally recorded data." There were no repair tickets requested for any of the three vehicles' missing videos on the scene that night.

When video footage was initially released, it did not contain audio, although Chicago Police dashboard cameras should automatically record audio when the video recording is activated. According to a CPD video, "The in-car camera system automatically engages both the audio and the video recording when the vehicles' emergency roof lights are activated," and each vehicle has a front and rear camera and microphone. City officials initially blamed a technical problem. It was later revealed that the audio recording equipment in officer Van Dyke's vehicle had been "intentionally damaged," according to records from police technicians. Another car's audio was disabled, as the microphones were in the glove compartment, with the batteries inserted backwards. A mobile start-up recorder was corrupted, and another camera was processing other video at the time. The Sun-Times published that a sergeant reported officers throwing their microphones on the roof of the Jefferson Park police station to the Internal Police Review Authority, a month and a half before the release of the Laquan McDonald dashcam video in an apparent protest against being recorded. Fraternal Order of Police president Dean Angelo defended officers in an interview, saying that operator error could be any number of accidents, adding, "Things always trickle downhill so it winds up the responsibility of the beat officer—God forbid it's the responsibility of the agency."

=== Burger King surveillance video ===
There was also a security camera at a nearby Burger King restaurant that possibly captured the shooting, but during the time of the shooting, there is a gap of 86 minutes in the recording. The manager of the restaurant said that on the night of the shooting, five Chicago police officers gained access to the video and passwords on the equipment, and that by the time the Independent Police Review Authority requested to view the footage the next day, it had been erased. The Tribune later obtained footage showing a Chicago police employee working on the restaurant's computers after the shooting. However, according to FBI sources, the video taken from the Burger King surveillance camera was not altered, and there were gaps throughout the surveillance video, because the system at Burger King was a "mess".

=== $5 million settlement ===
Attorneys for the estate of Laquan McDonald entered into negotiations with the City of Chicago to settle claims arising out of his murder. The Chicago City Council approved a $5 million settlement to McDonald's family on April 15, 2015, although the family had not yet filed a wrongful death lawsuit. Emails from the mayor's office surrounding the case later revealed the settlement deal was finalized the day after the Mayor of Chicago, Rahm Emanuel, secured his second term by a run-off election. Part of the settlement agreement required that the video be sealed until investigations were completed, which could have delayed the release of the video for years. Aldermen were not shown the dash-cam video before approving the settlement, although city Corporation Counsel Stephen Patton said that the existence of the video influenced the council's decision to settle before a lawsuit, and details about the video were given to the Finance Committee during a hearing. The decision took only "5 seconds out of a two-hour, 45 minute meeting" to approve. Dick Simpson, a UIC political scientist and former Chicago alderman, said "It's odd, not only in this case, but maybe in others, that there isn't more debate on the floor, because that's where the public gets informed."

== Legal proceedings ==
=== Requests for documents ===
Reporters noted inconsistencies between the narrative police told reporters, the autopsy, and an anonymous eyewitness account before the video was publicly released. A whistle-blower expressed concern over the handling of the McDonald shooting a few weeks after the shooting, revealing "that there was a video and that it was horrific", to journalist Jamie Kalven and attorney Craig Futterman. The pair issued a statement calling on Chicago police to release the dash-cam video of the incident. The city of Chicago denied at least 15 requests for its release.

Brandon Smith, a freelance journalist, and William Calloway, a community activist, filed a request for the video under the Freedom of Information Act in May 2015. When the request was denied, Smith, through his attorney Matt Topic, filed a lawsuit against the City of Chicago in Cook County Circuit Court. Illinois Attorney General Lisa Madigan sent a letter to the Police Department the day before a court hearing, stating that they cannot withhold the video. She said that they had not substantiated their claim that releasing the video would interfere with an ongoing investigation or jeopardize a fair trial if any officer was charged. On November 19, Cook County Judge Franklin Valderrama denied the city's request for a stay, ordering the video to be released to the public no later than November 25. The city did not appeal the judge's decision. On November 24, after a press conference, the video was released that showed an officer fatally shooting McDonald.

=== Investigations ===
A criminal investigation also began weeks after the shooting, when the Independent Police Review Authority (IPRA) forwarded the case to the state's attorney's office and the FBI. The U.S. attorney's office confirmed on April 13, 2015, that they had been conducting a federal criminal investigation of the McDonald case in conjunction with the state attorney's office, after contradictions were found between the initial police report and the dash-cam video. The police report said that McDonald had lunged at an officer, but the video footage showed that McDonald made no lunges. The video does show that McDonald was swinging the knife in his right hand in a wide, but aimless manner as he walked down the street, and also appears to show that McDonald turns slightly to look briefly at Van Dyke and another officer who are pointing guns at him, but that he continues to walk away from both officers at the moment Van Dyke opens fire on him.

On December 2, 2015, Illinois Attorney General Lisa Madigan asked the U.S. Justice Department to launch a separate civil rights investigation of Chicago police tactics. DOJ enlarged the scope of their investigation based on early findings, issuing a report in January 2017.

=== Van Dyke's trial ===
On November 24, 2015, the same day the video was released, Cook County State's Attorney Anita Alvarez announced that Van Dyke was charged with first-degree murder, and Van Dyke turned himself in to authorities. He was initially held without bail at Cook County Jail for six days. Crowd funding website GoFundMe shut down a page that was set up to raise funds for his legal defense shortly after it had raised just over $10,000. On November 30, Van Dyke was granted bail, set at $1,500,000. He posted $150,000—ten percent of the bail—and was released from jail.

On December 16, Van Dyke was indicted by a grand jury on six counts of first-degree murder and one count of official misconduct. The six counts of first-degree murder were:

- Murder/Intent to Kill/Injure With Firearm
- Murder/Strong Probability to Kill/Injure With Firearm
- Murder/Intent to Kill/Injure Discharge Firearm
- Murder/Strong Probability to Kill/Injure Discharge Firearm
- Murder/Intent to Kill/Injure Discharge Firearm Proximately
- Murder/Strong Probability to Kill/Injure Discharge Firearm Proximately

On December 29, 2015, Van Dyke pleaded not guilty to the charges.

Van Dyke's attorney, Daniel Herbert, said that his client feared for his life. Protesters yelled at him and called him names as he approached the courthouse for his arraignment. After the arraignment, Herbert said he was looking for evidence to clear his client's name.

On January 29, 2016, Herbert accused Chicago's mayor of tainting possible jurors, as he considered an effort to move the trial outside of Cook county:

It's been dozens and dozens of comments where [Rahm Emanuel] essentially indicted my client. He's characterized my client's actions as being heinous without even seeing the videotape. So when the mayor of the city in which the pool of jurors is drawn from has taken such an adamant stance, it makes it extremely difficult for us to get a juror in here who is not predisposed to a finding of guilt.

If convicted of first-degree murder, Van Dyke would have faced a prison sentence of 20 years to life. The case marked the first time in nearly 35 years that a Chicago police officer had been charged with first-degree murder for an on-duty fatality.

On March 23, 2017, the charges against Van Dyke were six counts of first degree murder and 16 counts of aggravated battery, one for each shot fired at Laquan McDonald. Jury selection began on September 5, 2018, and the trial commenced on September 17.

On October 5, 2018, Van Dyke was found guilty of second degree murder and 16 counts of aggravated battery with a firearm, but was acquitted of official misconduct.

On January 18, 2019, Van Dyke was sentenced to 81 months (almost seven years) in prison for the second-degree murder conviction alone instead of the other more serious charges, which was contrary to Illinois Supreme Court precedent.

Illinois Attorney General Kwame Raoul filed a request with the Illinois Supreme Court to vacate Van Dyke's sentence for second-degree murder and impose a sentence on each of the 16 aggravated battery counts. A majority of Illinois Supreme Court Justices voted to deny this request without a hearing or explanation. Two of the justices authored dissenting opinions, stating the decision of the sentencing judge had been unlawful.

The Illinois Department of Corrections refused to disclose the state prison where Van Dyke was initially incarcerated to serve his sentence, citing safety reasons. He was transferred on February 5, 2019, to the Federal Correctional Institution in Danbury, Connecticut. During his first week at this facility, he was assaulted by other inmates while in the general population. Sometime after the assault, he was transferred to the Federal Correctional Institution, Otisville, New York. In November 2019, he was moved from the Otisville federal prison to a state prison outside Illinois.

On February 3, 2022, Van Dyke was released from prison after serving 39 months of his 81-month sentence. He was eligible to be released early due to good behavior in prison. He was subsequently on mandatory supervised release, i.e. parole.

=== Trial of March, Walsh, and Gaffney ===
On June 27, 2017, three current or former Chicago police officers were charged with conspiracy, official misconduct, and obstruction of justice connected with a coverup of the shooting. Those charged were David March, the lead detective in this case, Joseph Walsh, Van Dyke's partner on the night of the shooting, and Thomas Gaffney. Their bench trial began on November 27, 2018. On January 17, 2019, Cook County Judge Domenica Stephenson found them not guilty of the charges.

== Reactions ==
=== Protests ===
==== November protests ====
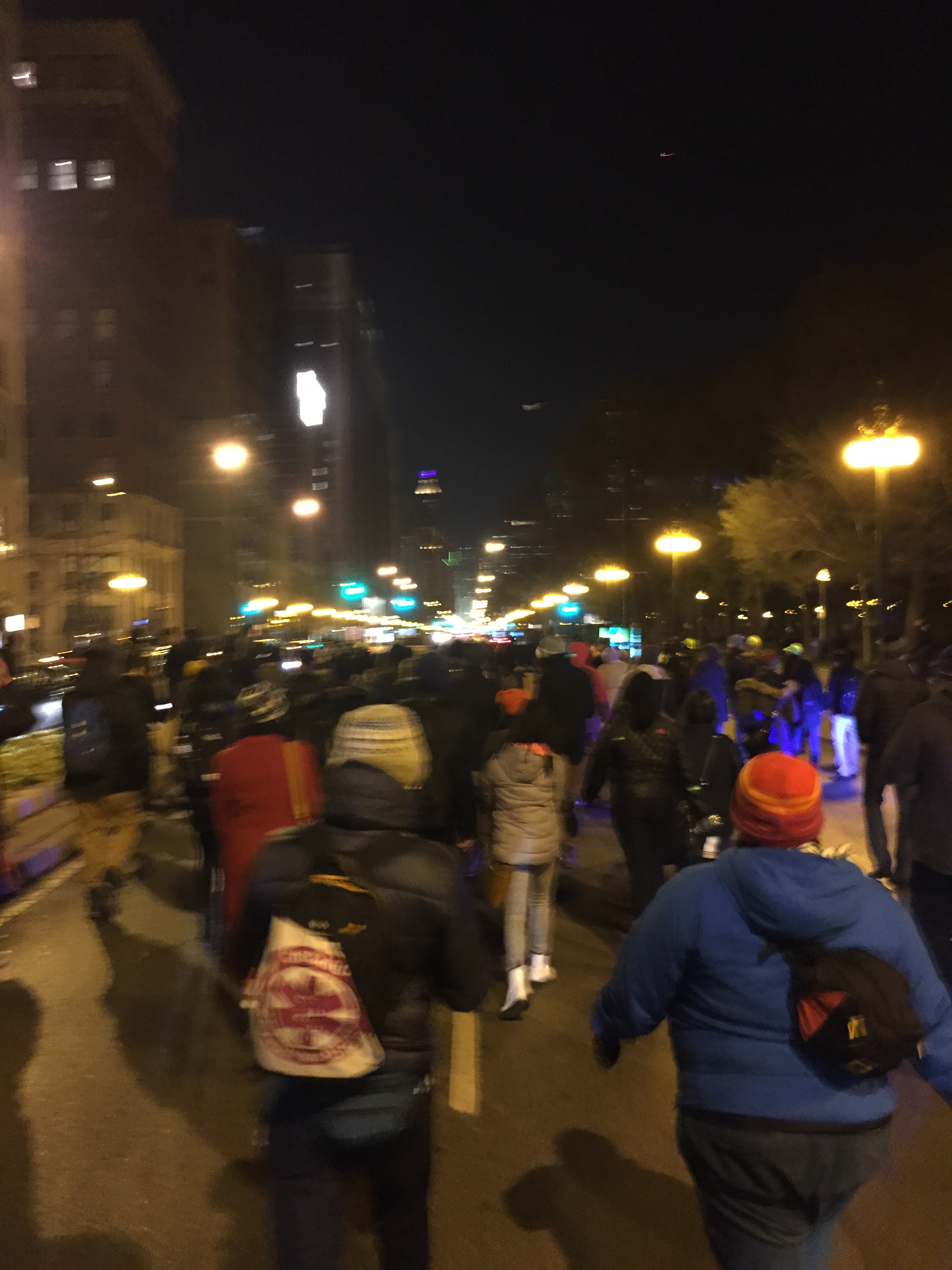
Protest on November 24, 2015, Michigan Ave., in response to recent video footage showing 17-year old Laquan McDonald being shot and killed by a Chicago police officer

After the release of the video on November 24, 2015, a few hundred people blocked the intersection of Roosevelt and Michigan avenues in protest. On November 25, 2015, more protests were held. On the second night of protest, marchers tore off lights from a public Christmas tree in Daley Plaza and multiple marchers were arrested.

On Friday, November 27, a major day for Christmas shopping in the U.S., a group of protesters chanted "sixteen shots" and other slogans while marching on Michigan Avenue, the city of Chicago's central shopping district. This caused some businesses to shut their doors and the police closed Michigan Avenue, a six-lane street.

==== December protests ====
Video of Chicago Police Board Hearing on December 9, 2015

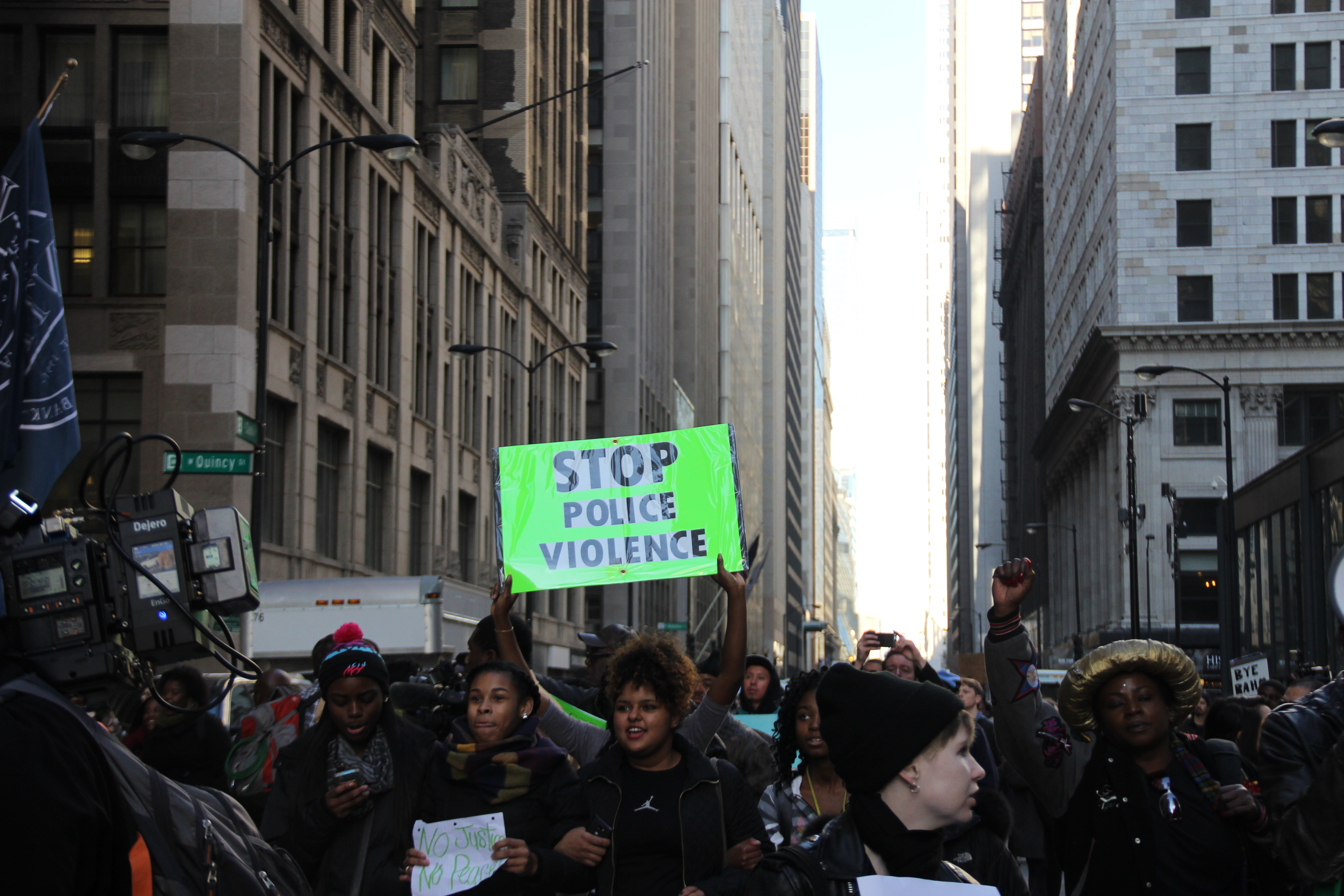
Protest on December 9, 2015

A 16-hour sit-in at the Cook County building on December 3, 2015, proceeded after Alvarez refused to resign on December 2. Protests erupted in the Loop after Mayor Emanuel called a special council meeting to apologize for his slow reaction to fix problems within the Chicago police department. On December 24, a month after the video had been published, protests disrupting Christmas-season shopping were again held on Michigan Avenue. Protesters also stood in the alley behind Emanuel's home the last three days in a row in December, promising to continue for 13 more days—to symbolize the 16 shots McDonald took from police—in an effort to force Emanuel to resign. On New Year's Eve, protesters temporarily took over parts of City Hall and a Hyatt hotel lobby, chanting "Rahm gotta go."

==== January protests ====
Over 100 African-American pastors boycotted the 30-year tradition of the Rev. Martin Luther King Jr. Interfaith Breakfast, hosted by Chicago's mayor Rahm Emanuel. The breakfast was attended by Rev. Matthew Ross, who interrupted the proceedings when he stood up and began to chant "16 shots and a cover-up" during a musical performance. The day after Martin Luther King Jr. Day, about 200 Black Youth Project 100 Chicago Chapter members, dressed in black T-shirts with the words "Fund Black Futures" written across them, blocked the entrance of the Chicago Patrolmen's Federal Credit Union in an effort to protest the Fraternal Order of Police's advocacy of the Chicago police department. City officials continue to deal with the aftermath of the McDonald shooting and are working to change the long-standing policy of keeping police shooting video under wraps. Protesters chanted "16 shots and a cover-up!" as Officer Van Dyke walked into court for a status hearing on January 29, 2016.

==== February protests ====
Laquan McDonald protesters hijacked a rally to support Apple's decision to fight back in the Apple–FBI encryption dispute in front of the Apple store on Michigan Avenue on February 24, 2016. Protesters started chants against Alvarez and Emanuel, but the crowd dispersed after several in the crowd got into a shoving match with police.

==== March protests ====
A rally started at State and Jackson consisting of "less than 50 people" on March 2, 2016, to mark 500 days since the shooting of Laquan McDonald. Other protesters were arrested for blocking the flow of traffic on Adams near Michigan Avenue.

=== Other reactions ===
On November 25, 2015, Senator and presidential candidate Bernie Sanders released a statement sending condolences to McDonald's family and criticizing the Emanuel administration and Chicago's police force.

On November 29, 2015, Jabari Dean, a student at the University of Illinois Chicago, posted an online threat to kill 16 unspecified white males — one for every shot fired at McDonald, plus any white police officers who might intervene — at the university. The university announced that classes would be cancelled the next day. The same day, the FBI arrested Dean, who was charged with "transmitting in interstate commerce communications containing a threat to injure the person of another." Federal prosecutors stated they did not believe Dean had the means to carry out the attack he had threatened. The federal charge was later dropped against Dean.

Chance the Rapper referred to the shooting on Saturday Night Live on December 12, 2015. He would refer to the shooting again on his second appearance on the show with Kanye West on February 13, 2016.

On June 2, 2016, Vic Mensa released a song entitled "16 Shots", referring to McDonald's death.

== Aftermath ==
=== Chicago Police Accountability Task Force ===
The Chicago Police Accountability Task Force final report

On December 1, 2015, Rahm Emanuel created the Chicago Police Accountability Task Force, led by then-President of the Chicago Police Board Lori Lightfoot, "to review the system of accountability, oversight and training that is currently in place for Chicago's police officers." The Task Force's final report, published April 13, 2016, found racism and systemic failures in the city's police force, validating complaints made for years by African-American residents.

=== Firing of Superintendent Garry McCarthy ===
Emanuel fired the head of the Chicago Police Department, Superintendent Garry McCarthy, on December 1, 2015, under political pressure from protesters. McCarthy knew of the dash-cam video a few weeks after the shooting and stripped Officer Van Dyke of his police powers. Due to the IPRA investigation under way, McCarthy could not fire the officer, nor discipline him or put him on a "no pay" status. McCarthy refused to resign, so Emanuel fired him.

=== Calls for Anita Alvarez's resignation ===
Cook County State's Attorney Anita Alvarez was criticized by political challengers and others for the delay in the release of the dash-cam video, which she viewed weeks after the shooting, and the long wait to charge Van Dyke for McDonald's death. This took more than a year and was completed only hours before the court-ordered release of the video. She faced a difficult primary election in March 2016. Calls for her resignation came from within her own party, including Cook County Board President Toni Preckwinkle.

As of December 2, 2015, Alvarez had refused to resign, which prompted a 16-hour sit-in by protesters at the Cook County building on December 3, 2015. Alvarez said she had been cooperating with the FBI investigation since November 2014, and asked her critics why she would call in the FBI if she was attempting a cover-up. She also defended Mayor Rahm Emanuel's comments that it would be premature to release the dash-cam video in light of the investigation, saying it "was in the best interest of the investigation". Kim Foxx, a former prosecutor running against Alvarez with support by Jesse Jackson and other civil rights leaders, disagrees:

By waiting so long to press charges in this case, State's Attorney Alvarez has done the McDonald family and the entire criminal justice system a heinous disservice. She waited until her hand was forced by intense political and media pressure surrounding the release of this painful video. She waited even after City Hall was prepared to pay the McDonald family $5 million in damages.

In the 2016 election for Cook County State's Attorney, Alvarez was the subject of an activist campaign (sometimes referred to as "#ByeAnita") that criticized her for her handling of the Laquan McDonald and Rekia Boyd cases, along with her broader role in the criminal justice system. Alvarez lost her bid for reelection in the March 2016 primary, earning 29 percent of the votes. Challenger Kim Foxx, who ran on a platform of criminal justice reform, won with 58 percent of the votes, and went on to win the general election.

=== Calls for Rahm Emanuel's resignation ===
McDonald's killing occurred four months before Emanuel faced a difficult campaign for reelection in February 2015. (He failed to win the majority and was elected by 56 percent in a runoff election—the first in Chicago's history— against Jesús "Chuy" García.) The delayed timing of release of the video, the Chicago City Council's awarding the family $5 million within weeks of McDonald's death, and Emanuel firing Police Superintendent Garry McCarthy, prompted some commentators to accuse the city of cover-up.

Journalist Ben Joravsky wrote in the Chicago Reader:

Just imagine [if] Mayor Emanuel had released the video in, say, November [2014]—without being forced to by a lawsuit.... But of course, he didn't do the right thing. He buried the video. He allowed officials to mislead the public. He hid the tapes because most likely he [...] assumed it would hurt his reelection campaign. Thus he not only did the immoral thing, he did the politically stupid thing. Cook County state's attorney Anita Alvarez probably would've quickly responded with an indictment—just like she did earlier this week, when the tape actually was released. I mean, it's really hard to look at that tape and not call for an indictment. If the mayor had done that, he wouldn't be the villain in this sordid story. He'd be the hero. Or at least the guy who finally, for once in his life, did the right thing.

Emanuel subsequently created the Task Force on Police Accountability to review current training and oversight for Chicago's police officers. He also maintained he never saw the dash-cam video until it was publicly released and would not resign. Emanuel's image received a blow when U.S. District Judge Edmond Chang accused city attorney Jordan Marsh, an attorney who handled cases in the office that represents the city in police misconduct lawsuits, of hiding evidence in a fatal police shooting.

There was no legal mechanism to force Emanuel's resignation. State representative La Shawn K. Ford filed House Bill 4356 to set up the mechanism for a recall election, but it was not passed. Illinois Republican governor Bruce Rauner said he would sign such a bill.

=== Video released of shooting of Ronald Johnson III ===
On December 1, 2015, the city announced that there was a video of a fatal police shooting that took place on October 12, 2014. Cook County State's Attorney Anita Alvarez's office investigated possible criminal charges against Officer George Hernandez (whose name was revealed on December 7), who shot Ronald Johnson III in the back during a foot chase. The officer opened fire seconds after arriving on the scene, when Johnson was moving away from police. Johnson was allegedly a known gang member and also allegedly armed; a gun was recovered at the scene. The attorney for Johnson's family contends police planted the weapon. The city fought to keep the video of the incident secret so as not to jeopardize the officer's right to a fair trial should he be indicted. As in the McDonald case, the video lacks audio. The city released the video on December 7 due to pressure for transparency prompted by the McDonald case. No charges have been filed against Hernandez.

=== De-escalation and Taser training ===
On December 30, 2015, Emanuel announced sweeping reforms within the police department, including new police training for handling tense situations and equipping every officer with a Taser, to be used to control suspects. All officers were to be equipped and trained by June 2016. Officers at the McDonald scene were waiting for a Taser to arrive before Van Dyke shot the suspect. At that time, 21.5 percent of officers had been trained to use a Taser.

Dean Angelo, president of the Chicago chapter of the Fraternal Order of Police, said on the subject: "I know there are people on the job for 9 or 10 years who have not been trained. I can't say they have all requested training, but I am sure some have. It's very hard to get the proper training as a Chicago police officer and that's something that has been going on for a very long time. There is certainly a percentage of my members who believe that the Chicago Police Department doesn't offer the same level of training, or the same opportunities to obtain training, as many other police departments in the country. I think the general attitude is that's just 'Welcome to the Chicago Police Department.'"

=== Emails from the mayor's office released ===
On December 31, 2015, 3,085 pages of emails split across seven PDFs regarding the McDonald case and other police-related matters were obtained under the Illinois Freedom of Information Act. The timing of the release (on New Year's Eve) has been described by reporters as "strategic". The exchanges show that the mayor's staff had been communicating with both the IPRA and the office of the Cook County state attorney since the October 2014 shooting. They document fact-gathering and news-monitoring, to crafting a unified "message" on how to respond to media inquiries regarding the McDonald shooting. The emails included several highly redacted speech drafts to use if the video was released, prepared nearly a year before the release of the dash-cam video, which Emanuel's top aides knew existed. The emails also cover the topics of discrepancies between the police reports and dash-cam video, the lack of audio on the dash-cam videos (which senior mayoral adviser David Spielfogel noted: "The number of malfunctions seems a bit odd."), express exasperation with statements made by the IPRA, note the missing Burger King footage, and reports on protests and social media activity—all of which is highly redacted.

The media characterized the emails as calling into question the "independence" of the Independent Police Review Authority (IPRA), an agency approved by Chicago City Hall in 2007 to investigate allegations of police misconduct and made up entirely of civilian members. Aides to the mayor have responded that the communications were routine and did not interfere with the IPRA's investigation.

Scott Ando, the former head of the IPRA who was fired by Emanuel in December, concurred that the mayor's office never interfered in the agency's investigations. He said: "We were generally asked to clear every messaging or release to the press ... I really think if I'd been allowed to be more responsive to the questions that were posed, it would have cleared the air a lot sooner." The emails also reveal communication from the mayor's office with influential religious leaders Reverend Jesse Jackson and Father Michael Pfleger, asking them to soften their critical remarks on the case and explain the city could not fire Officer Van Dyke due to the IPRA investigation.

Streetsblog Chicago reporter Steven Vance, Chicago Teachers Union member Luke Carman, and Twitter user "natalie solidarity", among others, collaborated on an effort to catalog the documents for easier access by readers.

=== Request for emails from Van Dyke and other police officers ===
In January 2016, CNN submitted a Freedom of Information Act request for emails regarding the McDonald case from Van Dyke, his partner, and other police officers. CNN requested emails from both official CPD email accounts and personal email accounts. However, after CNN appealed to the Public Access Counselor, CPD officials revealed that they had not attempted to look through the officers' personal email accounts, arguing that personal emails are not public records subject to disclosure.

In August that year, Attorney General Lisa Madigan ruled that emails on personal accounts that pertain to public business must be disclosed to the public. Her ruling was a binding opinion, requiring CPD to search the officers' email accounts and comply with the decision within 35 days. CPD appealed the ruling in court, and lost in September 2017. Ultimately, CNN never received the emails that it had requested. Each of the officers, individually or through their attorneys, either refused to provide emails, ignored the request, or denied having any relevant emails.

=== Documents from 2005 Incident ===
In May 2016, CNN revealed documents of a 2005 incident, in which Van Dyke had written a police report without speaking to any of the personnel or witnesses at the scene of another police shooting. Records of the investigation indicated that Van Dyke had also inappropriately thrown out the original documents pertaining to the case.

=== Two recommendations that officers be fired ===
On August 16, 2016, inspector Joseph Ferguson recommended that 10 officers be fired, followed up by Superintendent Eddie T. Johnson's recommendation on August 18, that 7 police officers be fired for false or misleading statements made about the incident.

=== 2017 DOJ report and repercussions ===
DOJ announced the completion of their investigation and issued a "scathing report" in early January 2017, noting problems in a police culture of excessive violence, especially against minorities; and lack of training and oversight. DOJ and the city have a preliminary agreement to undertake broad reforms for improvement, with the goal of increasing the safety of both citizens and officers. It noted the department's improvements, such as training in de-escalation to avoid use of force, issuance of Tasers, officers wearing body cameras, and the reshaping of a police oversight body.

Also in January 2017, the city and DOJ signed "an agreement in principle to work together, with community input, to create a federal court-enforceable consent decree addressing the deficiencies uncovered during the investigation. An independent monitor, who has yet to be chosen, will oversee compliance."

In February 2017, U.S. Attorney General Jeff Sessions signaled that the Trump administration would "pull back" on federal civil rights probes of local police departments. He would not commit to enforcing the consent decree signed by Chicago and the Department of Justice.

In June 2017, Mayor Emanuel backed off his commitment to enter a court-enforced agreement with the federal government. He said that an independent monitor selected by the city could work with the Justice Department to pursue police reforms without court oversight. Later that month, a group of civil rights organizations filed a federal lawsuit seeking court enforcement of police reforms. Also in June, Toni Preckwinkle, the president of the Cook County Board of Commissioners, and Jesús "Chuy" García, another member of the Cook County Board, advocated for judicial oversight, as did Chicago Inspector General Joseph Ferguson. In August 2017, Illinois Attorney General Lisa Madigan filed a lawsuit in federal court requesting that a judge oversee police reform in Chicago.

In July 2018, Chicago mayor Rahm Emanuel and Illinois attorney general Lisa Madigan announced a proposed court settlement that was the first draft of a consent decree that would eventually serve as a court-enforced mandate governing reforms of the Chicago Police Department.

== Documentary film ==
16 Shots is a documentary film about the shooting of Laquan McDonald and the subsequent police cover-up. It was directed by Richard Rowley, and produced by Jacqueline Soohen, Karim Hajj and Jamie Kalven. Originally titled The Blue Wall, it premiered on May 1, 2018, at the Hot Docs Canadian International Documentary Festival in Toronto.

Rowley subsequently updated the film to include later events, and re-titled it 16 Shots. The revised documentary premiered on June 14, 2019, on the Showtime network.

== See also ==
- Dismissal of Robert Rialmo – Dismissal of Chicago Police officer
- Jon Burge – Chicago police chief charged with misconduct (1947–2018)
- List of homicides in Illinois
- List of killings by law enforcement officers in the United States, October 2014
- Police oversight in Chicago
- Skullcap Crew – Chicago Police gang
