= Police oversight in Chicago =

Five government agencies in the city of Chicago are charged with oversight of the Chicago Police Department. These agencies have overlapping authority and their membership is determined through a mix of appointments by the Mayor of Chicago, confirmations by the Chicago City Council, and elections. The agencies were created and reformed over several years as a result of ongoing efforts for civilian oversight of law enforcement and in response to numerous controversies in the police department.

== History ==
In 1974, mounting allegations of police brutality in Chicago led to the creation of a blue-ribbon panel led by U.S. Representative Ralph Metcalfe. On the panel's recommendation, the Office of Professional Standards (OPS) was formed as an independent investigating agency. In 2007, amid criticism of the OPS' ineffectiveness and a series of police scandals, the City Council and Mayor Richard M. Daley replaced it with the Independent Police Review Authority (IPRA). In 2015, controversy following the murder of Laquan McDonald led Mayor Rahm Emanuel to create the Police Accountability Task Force. In April 2016, the Task Force recommended sweeping changes including the replacement of IPRA with an agency with more authority and resources. In October 2016, City Council passed an ordinance creating the Civilian Office of Police Accountability (COPA) and granting more oversight powers to a new Deputy Inspector General for Public Safety in the city's inspector general office.

=== CPAC and GAPA ===
In the 2010s, two new proposals for civilian oversight of police emerged and gained some support in the City Council. The Chicago chapter of the National Alliance Against Racist and Political Repression began drafting an ordinance called Civilian Police Accountability Council (CPAC) in 2012, which was first introduced in City Council by alderperson Carlos Ramirez-Rosa in 2016. This was in part motivated by the murder of 17-year-old Laquan McDonald by Chicago Police officer Jason Van Dyke. It was proposed when then-Mayor of Chicago Rahm Emanuel formed the Police Accountability Task Force, which was chaired Lori Lightfoot, who was later elected Mayor after Emanuel stepped down. As of 2020, only 19 Chicago aldermen supported the legislation; support from 26 aldermen is needed to pass the legislation.

The CPAC proposal would have created an elected agency with "authority to select the person in charge of the department tasked with investigating cops, hire and fire the police superintendent and make the final call on police rules." CPAC would be an elected council with a representative from each of Chicago's 22 police districts with the power to both appoint and dismiss the Superintendent of Police, investigate police misconduct, and would be the final authority regarding discipline in the Chicago Police Department.

In 2016, a coalition of community organizations formed the Grassroots Alliance for Police Accountability (GAPA), and proceeded to introduce an alternative police oversight proposal in 2017. The proposal, based partly on reforms in Seattle and Los Angeles, would have created a new commission with "the power to subpoena documents, fire the police superintendent, reversible only by a two-thirds City Council vote, establish police policy, choose the Police Board and hire and fire the Police Board president."

After voicing some support for the GAPA proposal in the 2019 election, Mayor Lori Lightfoot backed away from the proposal in October 2020, primarily over the issue of whether the proposed civilian body or the mayor would have final say over police department policy.

=== ECPS ===
In February 2021, the CPAC and GAPA coalitions began talks on a joint effort for a compromise ordinance, which they put forward the subsequent month as the Empowering Communities for Public Safety (ECPS) ordinance. The measure advanced through City Council and garnered support with the Progressive, Black, and Latino caucuses. Lightfoot introduced an alternative measure, which would have retained mayoral control over superintendent appointments and departmental policy. In July 2021, Lightfoot agreed to support the ECPS proposal after a compromise that gave the proposed civilian commission authority over departmental policy while allowing for mayoral vetos of the commission (which in turn could be overturned by a two-thirds majority of City Council). The next week, the City Council passed the Empowering Communities for Public Safety ordinance in a 36–13 vote. The ordinance created two new bodies: a 7-member Community Commission for Public Safety and Accountability (CCPSA) and 3-member district councils for each of the 22 police districts in the city.

== Agencies ==
=== Police District Councils ===
The Empowering Communities for Public Safety (ECPS) ordinance enacted in 2021 created 22 district councils corresponding to each of the 22 police districts in Chicago. Each council will consist of three members who are elected to four-year terms. The councils are required to hold monthly meetings and are charged with building connections between the police and the community, collaborating on the implementation of community policing, and soliciting community input on police policies and practices. The district councils also nominate 14 candidates for the Community Commission for Public Safety and Accountability (CCPSA), of which seven will be selected by the Mayor.

The first elections for district council members were held during the 2023 municipal elections, and the councils took office on May 2, 2023.

=== Community Commission for Public Safety and Accountability ===
The ECPS ordinance enacted in 2021 also created the Community Commission for Public Safety and Accountability (CCPSA), a seven-member body that is charged with police oversight and accountability. The CCPSA holds monthly public meetings and is charged with promoting community engagement and transparency in policing, and has various oversight powers including:

- Submitting a list of candidates when vacancies occur in the offices of police superintendent, Police Board members, or COPA chief administrator (the Mayor selects and the Council confirms a nominee from this list)
- Setting goals for the police superintendent, the police department, the COPA chief administrator, and Police Board and evaluating the performance of each
- Soliciting public comment on and approving proposed policy changes for the police department (CCPSA decisions can be vetoed by the Mayor; these vetoes can in turn be overridden by a two-thirds majority of the City Council)
- Making recommendations to the Public Safety Inspector General
- Reviewing and recommending changes to the police department budget

In August 2022, Mayor Lori Lightfoot selected seven interim members for the CCPSA based on 14 candidates nominated by the City Council, who served until May 2024. In May 2024, new members were confirmed by City Council; these members were selected for nomination by the Mayor based on a list of 15 candidates recommended by the police district councils.

=== Chicago Police Board ===
The Chicago Police Board is a nine-member agency charged with adopting rules and regulations for the department, and deciding disciplinary cases when the Superintendent files to discharge or suspend (for more than 30 days) a police officer. The Board is also charged with resolving disciplinary cases when there is a dispute between the Chief Administrator of the Civilian Office of Police Accountability and the Superintendent. The board is made up of nine civilian members who are appointed by the Mayor and confirmed by the City Council. The Board previously had the role of nominating candidates for the position of Superintendent to the Mayor, but this role is now part of the CCPSA.

=== Civilian Office of Police Accountability ===
The Civilian Office of Police Accountability (COPA) is an independent city agency which has the authority to investigate allegations of police officer misconduct and police shootings. It can make recommendations about disciplinary action and department policy, but cannot take such action itself. COPA was created in 2016, replacing the former Independent Police Review Authority.

The current Chief Administrator of COPA is LaKenya White.

=== Deputy Inspector General for Public Safety ===
Within the city of Chicago's Office of Inspector General, the Deputy Inspector General for Public Safety is charged with "charged with auditing police practices, identifying troubling trends, recommending changes to the police contract and bird-dogging the new multi-tiered accountability system." This position was created in 2016, in the same ordinance that created the Independent Police Review Authority (since replaced by COPA).

The current Deputy Inspector General for Public Safety is Tobara Richardson, who was nominated by Inspector General Deborah Witzburg and confirmed by the City Council in September 2022.

== See also ==
- Chicago Police Department
- Civilian oversight of law enforcement
