= Chicago Police Accountability Task Force =

Task force, 2015–2016

The Chicago Police Accountability Task Force final report

The Chicago Police Accountability Task Force (CPATF) was a task force created to "review the system of accountability, oversight and training that is currently in place for Chicago's police officers" in 2015. It was announced via press release on December 1, 2015, in the wake of the murder of Laquan McDonald and the protests and political fallout afterward. On April 13, 2016, the task force released its final report, which found "racism and systemic failures in the city's police force, validating complaints made for years by African-American residents."

== Members ==
The members of the task force included:

- Lori Lightfoot – president of the Chicago Police Board and Task Force chair
- Deval Patrick - senior advisor
- Sergio Acosta – partner at Hinshaw & Culbertson and a former federal prosecutor
- Joseph M. Ferguson – inspector general of the City of Chicago
- Hiram Grau – former director of the Illinois State Police and former deputy superintendent of the Chicago Police Department
- Randolph N. Stone – University of Chicago Law School professor, director of the Criminal and Juvenile Justice Project Clinic and former Cook County public defender

== Public community forums ==
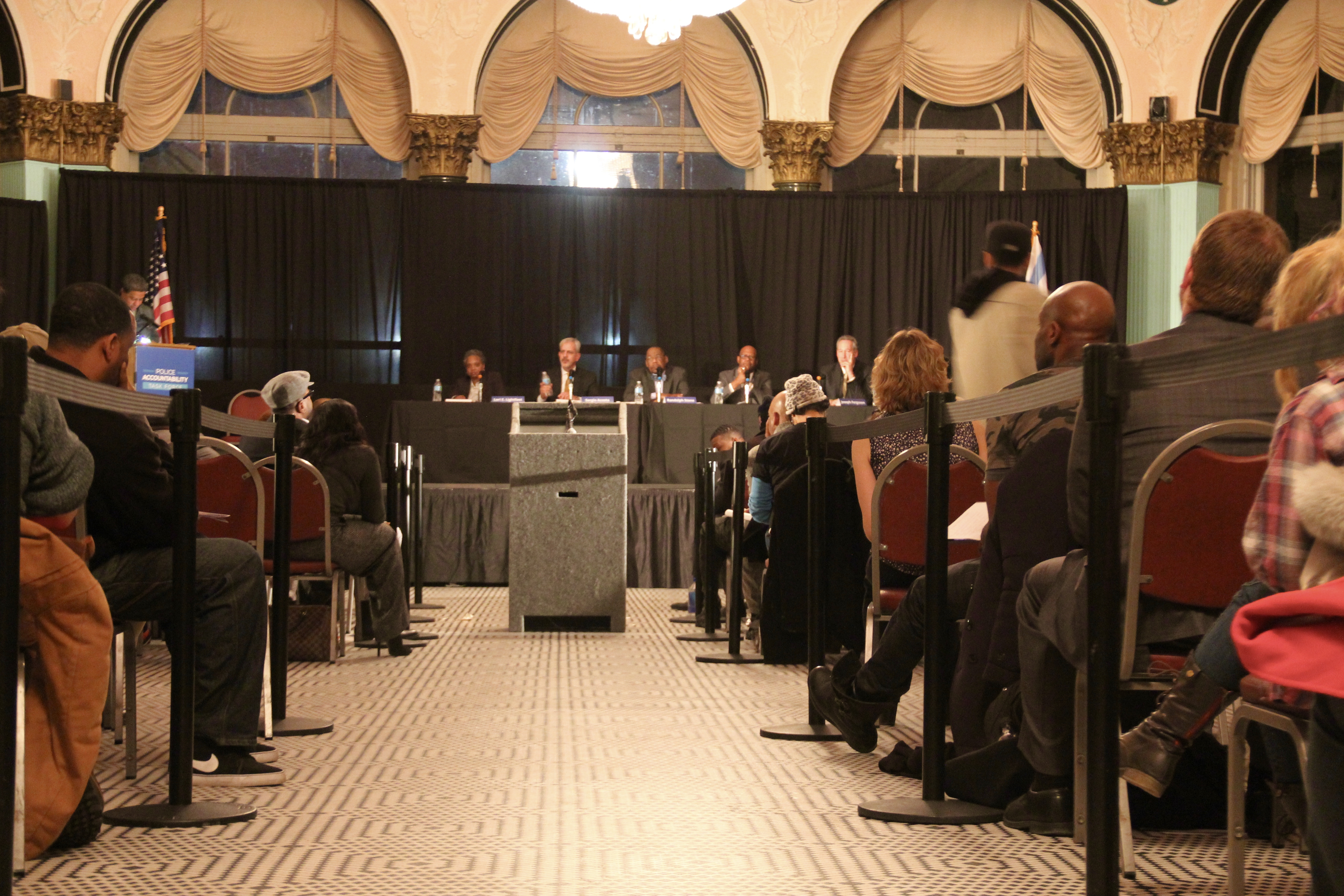
Forum at South Shore Cultural Center

The task force held four public community forums in February 2016 and one press event in April 2016 and published the meetings on YouTube.

== Final report ==
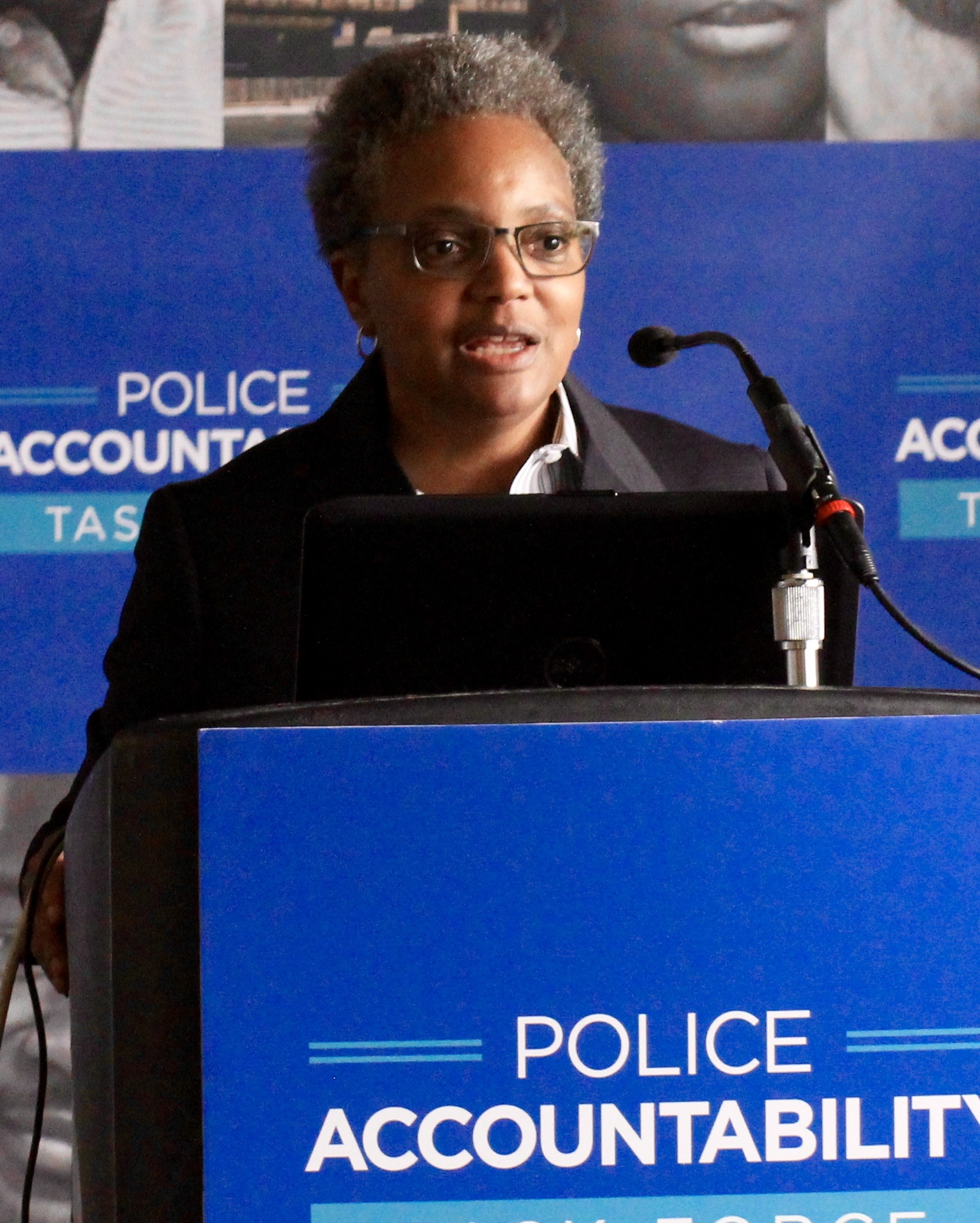
Task Force chair Lori Lightfoot unveils the report

The final report used Chicago police data to show that African-Americans were regularly and disproportionately abused and denied rights, which had been reported by many African-American residents of Chicago over many years. Chicago's population is approximately one-third black, Hispanic and white and according to the report, 404 people were shot by the Chicago police between 2008 and 2015 and 74 percent of those were African-American. According to the New York Times, the final report "was blistering, blunt and backed up by devastating statistics."

=== Reactions ===
As a result of the report, Chicago Mayor Rahm Emanuel announced that he would be implementing roughly one-third of the 76 recommendations in the report.

Dean Angelo, the president of Chicago's Fraternal Order of Police Lodge 7, declared the accusation of racism in the Chicago Police Department "biased". Lori Lightfoot, who was on the task force, responded to Angelo: "It is hard to fathom that Mr. Angelo maintains his reflexive, uninformed position when it is obviously belied by the facts. Does he really believe that a better trained, better prepared and more professional police force will not inure to the benefit of his members?"
