= Edgar A. Poe Award =

Award for excellence in journalism

Edgar A. Poe Memorial Award
- Description: Prize honoring journalistic excellence in news coverage of subjects and events of significant national or regional importance to the American people
- Country: United States
- Presented by: White House Correspondents' Association

The Edgar A. Poe Memorial Award was a prize for journalistic excellence that was awarded by the White House Correspondents Association (WHCA). The prize, which paid $2,500 in 2011, was funded by the New Orleans Times-Picayune and Newhouse Newspapers in honor of the distinguished correspondent Edgar Allen Poe (1906–1998), a former WHCA president unrelated to the American fiction writer of the nearly identical name.

The award, which honored excellence in news coverage of subjects and events of significant national or regional importance to the American people, was presented from 1990 to 2019 at the annual dinner of the WHCA (when it was discontinued in place of two new awards).

== List of winners ==
Year	Recipient	Employer	Article / Show	Notes / Ref.
1989	Keith Epstein	The Plain Dealer		
1990	Rochelle Sharpe and Marjie Lundstrom	Gannett News Service	"A series of reports ... on child abuse."	
1991	Stewart M. Powell and Charles J. Lewis	Hearst Newspapers	"A three-part series detailing the magnitude and human impact of the war's friendly fire casualties and chronicling the anguish of the families involved."	
1992	Chris Drew and Mick Tackett	Chicago Tribune	"A series of articles on lobbying... [and] how the system functions."	
1993	Richard Whittle	The Dallas Morning News		
1994	Russell Carollo and Cheryl Reed	Dayton Daily News		
1995	Joby Warrick and Pat Stith	The News & Observer (Raleigh, NC)	"'The Power of Pork,' their well-researched series on the pork farming business..."	
1996	Byron Acohido	The Seattle Times	"Safety at Issue: The 737", "ferreting out compelling evidence that undoubtedly contributed as much as anything else to safety improvements in the world's most popular aircraft."	
1997	Earl Lane and Andrew Smith	Newsday	Their series "The Leftovers of the Nuclear Age."	
1998	Michael Isikoff	Newsweek	"Clinton–Lewinsky scandal"	
1999	Sam Roe	The Toledo Blade	"Exposing a major health risk to nuclear weapons plant workers that was concealed by the U.S. government for half a century."	
2000	Elizabeth Marchak, Dave Davis, and Joan Mazzolini	The Plain Dealer		
2000	John Barry and Evan Thomas	Newsweek		Honorable Mention
2000	David Pace	Associated Press		Honorable Mention
2001	Evan Thomas, Mark Hosenball, Martha Brant, and Roy Gutman	Newsweek		
2001	Staff	The Seattle Times		Honorable Mention
2001	Staff	The Dayton Daily News		Honorable Mention
2002	Sean Naylor	Army Times		
2002	Staff	South Florida Sun-Sentinel		Honorable Mention
2002	Michael Berens	Chicago Tribune		Honorable Mention
2003	Russell Corollo and Mei-ling Hopgood	Dayton Daily News		
2003	Christopher H. Schmitt and Edward T. Pound	U.S. News & World Report		Honorable Mention
2003	Michael Hudson	Southern Exposure magazine		Honorable Mention
2003	Warren P. Strobel and Jonathan S. Landy	Knight Ridder		Honorable Mention
2003	Rod Nordland and Michael Hirsh	Newsweek		Honorable Mention
2003	Sami Yousafzai, Ron Moreau, and Michael Hirsh	Newsweek		Honorable Mention
2003	Fareed Zakaria	Newsweek		Honorable Mention
2004	Mark Fainaru-Wada and Lance Williams	The San Francisco Chronicle		
2004	Donald Barlett and James Steele	Time magazine		Honorable Mention
2005	Marcus Stern and Jerry Kammer	Copley News Service		
2005	Staff	Time magazine		Honorable Mention
2005	Russell Carollo and Larry Kaplow	Dayton Daily News		Honorable Mention
2006	Joan Ryan	The San Francisco Chronicle		
2007	Paul Shukovsky, Tracy Johnson, and Daniel Lathrop	Seattle Post-Intelligencer		
2008	Michael J. Berens and Ken Armstrong	The Seattle Times		
2009	Suzanne Bohan and Sandy Kleffman	Contra Costa Times, California		
2010	Michael Berens	The Seattle Times		
2011	Matt Apuzzo, Adam Goldman, Eileen Sullivan, Chris Hawley	Associated Press		
2012	Jim Morris, Chris Hamby, Ronnie Greene	The Center for Public Integrity (CPI)	Hard Labor	
2013	Megan Twohey	Reuters	"The Child Exchange: Inside America's Underground Market for Adopted Children,"	
2013	Chris Hamby, Matthew Mosk, and Brian Ross	The Center for Public Integrity (CPI) and ABC News	"Breathless and Burdened: Dying from black lung, buried by law and medicine,"	
2014	Gary Fields, John R. Emshwiller, Rob Barry, and Coulter Jones	The Wall Street Journal	"America's Rap Sheet"	
2014	Carol D. Leonnig	The Washington Post	"Secret Service"	
2015	Neela Banerjee, John Cushman Jr., David Hasemyer, and Lisa Song	Inside Climate News		
2015	Terrence McCoy	The Washington Post		
2016	David Fahrenthold	The Washington Post		
2017	Jason Szep, Peter Eisler, Tim Reid, Lisa Girion, Grant Smith and team	Reuters	"Shock Tactics"	
2017	Norah O'Donnell	CBS This Morning	Sexual Assault in the Air Force Academy	Honorable Mention
2017	Dan Diamond and Rachana Pradhan	Politico	Tom Price's Private Jet Travel	Honorable Mention
2018	Joshua Schneyer, Michael Pell, Andrea Januta, and Deborah Nelson	Reuters	"Ambushed at Home"	

== See also ==
- Raymond Clapper Memorial Award
