= Chuck Neubauer =

American newspaper journalist

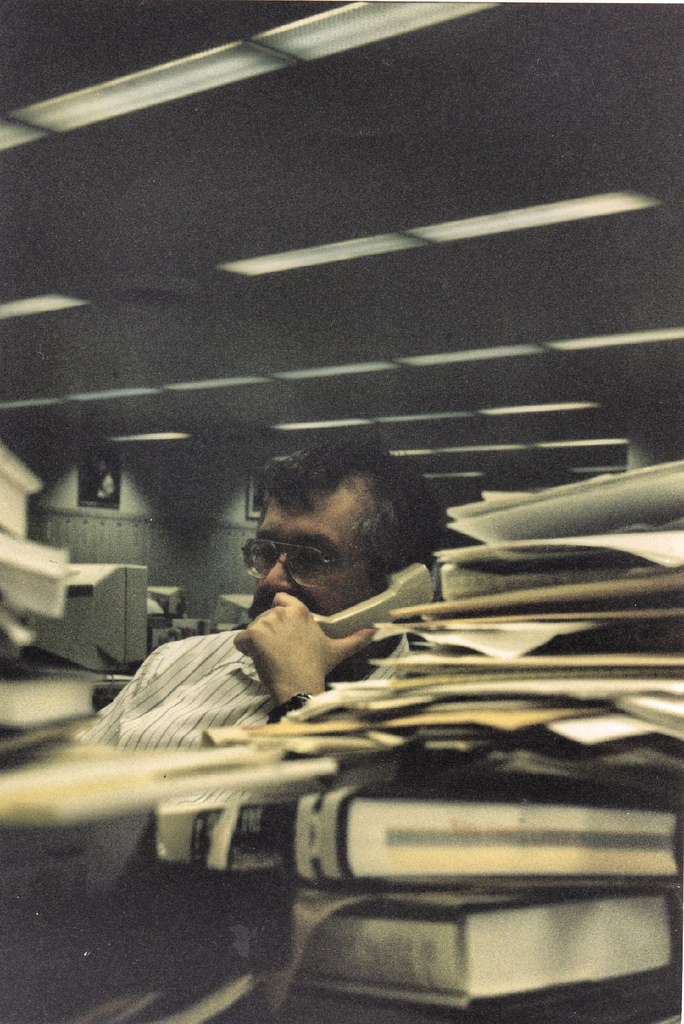
- Neubauer at the Sun-Times in 1998
- Born: February 15, 1950 (age 75)
- Education: Master's degree, Northwestern University, Medill School of Journalism
- Occupation(s): Journalist; Investigative reporter
- Years active: since 1973
- Awards: 1976 Pulitzer prize

Chuck Neubauer (born 13 February 1950) is an American investigative reporter and journalist. He has written for Chicago newspapers including Chicago Today, the Chicago Tribune, the Chicago Sun-Times, and other news organizations including the Los Angeles Times and The Washington Times.

He began working as a freelance journalist in 2013 in the D.C. Metro area and is a special contributor with the nonprofit, Better Government Association. Neubauer has made appearances on C-SPAN, and was featured on PBS in the 2006 Independent Lens series, "Democracy on Deadline." He was a recipient of the 1976 Pulitzer Prize for Local Investigative Specialized Reporting.

Neubauer graduated from the Medill School of Journalism at Northwestern University, receiving his bachelor's degree in 1972 and his master's in 1973. He is married to freelance investigative reporter Sandy Bergo, with whom he has collaborated on a number of investigative reports.

== Career ==
Neubauer has spent nearly fifty years as an investigative reporter and journalist, reporting on government agencies and covering local and national political figures. He worked as an investigator for the non-profit Better Government Association, while attending Northwestern University; after graduation, he began working as a reporter at Chicago Today (1973–1974).

He left to work for the Chicago Tribune in 1974, spending nine years with the newspaper, until leaving in 1983 for the Chicago Sun-Times (1983–2001). Neubauer worked with the Los Angeles Times (2001–2008), and The Washington Times from April 2009 until 2013.

In 2006, Neubauer, in answering the question, '"What do you think of the present and future of independent journalism,"' gave some insight into his hope for the future of journalism, in an era of media giants saying:

'"I think independent journalism is alive. I've done this for 30 some years and there definitely are good and bad cycles, but good stories still get done and they've always gotten done. The big local papers are still doing hard-edged stories that serve the community. Look at the stories that won the Pulitzer last year—there really is good journalism out there. I'm fortunate to work at a place with six investigative reporters in Washington D.C. and seven or eight in Los Angeles. And we get the time to do stories... it's been my experience that editors and reporters find a way to get stories done."'

He finished his thoughts on the subject, saying, '"That said, I don't cover national security, which is more difficult now, and getting something under the Federal Freedom of Information Act is a cumbersome process."'

In 2013, Neubauer began working as a freelance journalist, and as a special contributor for Better Government Association.

=== Chicago Tribune reporting ===
While at the Chicago Tribune, Neubauer shared the 1976 Pulitzer Prize for Local Investigative Specialized Reporting for a series about abuses in Federal Housing Administration programs. Neubauer worked with George Bliss on the stories for 7 months. The 1975 stories resulted in Carla Hills, the United States Secretary of Housing and Urban Development (HUD), issuing directives to tighten mortgage practices.

The Chicago Tribune published a series of his stories in 1977, and a second series, (1979–1981) that were used as evidence in Senate and House investigations. The stories are listed below.

- Ed Hanley Finds Gateway to Riches in Hotel Union, January 16, 1977.
- Hotel Union's Funds Spent on Patronage and Frills, January 17, 1977.
- Hotel Union Sinks Members' Dues into Three High-Risk Loans, January 18, 1977.
- Name Sherman House Hidden Partners, June 24, 1979.
- City Asks for Title to Sherman House, November 15, 1979.
- Sherman House Purchase OK'd, June 8, 1980.
- Teamsters Loaned Angelis Bank $2 Million, April 16, 1981
- Bank Loan Scheme Told, July 12, 1981.

=== Chicago Sun-Times reporting ===
In 1977, while working with the Chicago Tribune, Neubauer reported on United States Representative Dan Rostenkowski, "loading his payroll with cronies." Later, in 1992, while working for the Chicago Sun-Times, Neubauer led a new investigation into Rostenkowski, with colleagues Mark Brown, and Michael Briggs. They uncovered a number of crimes, including the discovery that Rostenkowski's campaign paid $73,000 rent on a building that he owned, and he had used taxpayer money to purchase three cars. They also reported on "ghost employees," on his House payroll. Federal prosecutors subpoenaed several witnesses named in their reports; Rostenkowski was indicted, convicted and imprisoned for federal crimes.

in 1993, the stories were nominated for the Goldsmith prize for Investigative Reporting. Thirteen years later, when asked which stories that he had covered did he consider most important, Neubauer cited the Rostenkowski story, saying "The story was important because he was important–a brilliant congressman who crossed the line."

=== Los Angeles Times reporting ===
In 2000, Tribune Media bought the Los Angeles Times and decided to build up their investigative unit in Washington. After hiring Deborah Nelson, as Washington investigations editor for the Times, Dean Baquet and Nelson talked about who they wanted to hire. In a 2001 story reported by Michael Miner, Nelson said '"the first name that came to both of us was Chuck," Nelson tells me. "I think Dean described him as a quintessential Washington reporter who by accident of birth spent his years in Chicago."'

In 2004, Neubauer and fellow reporters, Richard T. Cooper and Judy Pasternak, were nominated as finalists for the Goldsmith Prize for Investigative Reporting for "The Senators' Sons." In the nomination statement, the jury recognized the team for exposing "a growing pattern of U.S. senators helping special interests that pay the lawmakers' family members hundreds of thousands of dollars as consultants or lobbyists." The stories published by the Times in 2003 included: "A Washington Bouquet: Hire a Lawmaker's Kid," "Senator, His Son Get Boosts From Makers of Ephedra," "Senator's Way to Wealth Was Paved With Favors," and "In Nevada, the Name to Know is Reid."

=== Washington Times reporting ===
In 2009, Neubauer wrote an article concerning Dianne Feinstein, alleging ethical violations over her involvement in legislation that may have benefited her husband.

In October 2011, The Washington Times published a story by Neubauer, questioning whether there were ethical violations over connections between her husband's business ties and her endorsement of a nominee for ambassador to Hungary. Pelosi had listed the investment by her husband in her personal disclosure statement, as required by the House rules.

=== Freelance reporting ===
In 2014, as a freelancer, and contributor to Better Government Association, Neubaurer wrote "Big Profits for Pritzkers on Costly Chicago FBI deal," with his wife, Sandy Bergo of the Chicago Sun-Times. The article was the 2015 Winner of the Illinois Associated Press Media Editors Awards.

Later in 2018, Neubauer collaborated on two more stories, with Bergo, involving J. B. Pritzker. The first, published on February 8, 2018, "Pritzker's Storied Charity Costs Him Little but Taxpayers a Lot" was listed in Chicago Magazine as number four in the top 10 "must-read" stories of the week. A follow-up story, "Investigating Pritzker's Philanthropy," was published on February 11.

== Personal life ==
Neubauer is married to freelance investigative reporter Sandy Bergo, former Investigative Producer for WBBM-TV, WJLA-TV, and senior writer for the Center for Public Integrity; she was the executive director of the Fund for Investigative Journalism for 10 years. They have collaborated on a number of investigative reports, and have one child.

== Awards and recognition ==
- 1976 Winner Pulitzer Prize for Local Investigative Specialized Reporting, for a 1975 series about abuses in Federal Housing Administration programs, with George William Bliss, Chicago Tribune.
- 1980 Winner Chicago Tribune's Edward Scott Beck Award, for the Cook County Assessor investigation.
- 1993 Finalist Goldsmith prize for Investigative Reporting, for the Rostenkowski Investigation, with Mark Brown and Michael Briggs, Chicago Sun-Times.
- 1998 Finalist Goldsmith Prize for Investigative Reporting, for the Investigation into Chicago City Hall Ethics Abuses, Chicago Sun-Times.
- 1998 Ring Award for Investigative Reporting, for series on City Hall corruption, Chicago Sun-Times.
- 2001 Winner Kogan Media Award for Print Journalism from the Chicago Bar Association.
- 2004 Finalist Goldsmith prize, for "The Senators' Sons," with Richard T. Cooper and Judy Pasternak, Los Angeles Times.
- 2004 Finalist Los Angeles Press Club, Investigative series, with Richard T. Cooper and Judy Pasternak, Los Angeles Times.
- 2015 Finalist Peter Lisagor Awards for Exemplary Journalism, best Political and Government Reporting, for "Poshard the prince of pensions," with Sandy Bergo and Patrick Rehkamp, Better Government Association/Chicago Sun-Times.
- 2015 Winner Illinois Associated Press Media Editors Awards, (Division A Enterprise Story) for the 2014 story, "Big Profits for Pritzkers on Costly Chicago FBI deal," with Sandy Bergo of Better Government Association/Chicago Sun-Times.
