= Goldsmith Prize for Investigative Reporting =

Award for journalists at Harvard University

- Description: Architecture award for journalists with the goal of exposing examples of poor government, and encouraging good government
- Country: United States
- Presented by: Shorenstein Center on Media, Politics and Public Policy at Harvard University

The Goldsmith Prize for Investigative Reporting is an award for journalists administered by the Shorenstein Center on Media, Politics and Public Policy at Harvard University. The program was launched in 1991, with the goal of exposing examples of poor government, and encouraging good government in the United States. There is a $25,000 award for the winner.

The Goldsmith Awards Program is financially supported by an annual grant from the Greenfield Foundation.

== Awardees ==
Year	Winner(s)	Publication / Outlet	Work
2026	Hannah Dreier	The New York Times	“Exposed and Expendable”
2025	Katey Rusch and Casey Smith	The San Francisco Chronicle and the UC Berkeley Investigative Reporting Program	"Right to Remain Secret"
2024	Hannah Dreier	The New York Times	"Alone and Exploited"
2023	Anna Wolfe	Mississippi Today	"The Backchannel"
2022	Hannah Dreier and Andrew Ba Tran	The Washington Post	"Fema Disasters"
2021	Joseph Neff, Alysia Santo, Anna Wolfe, and Michelle Liu	The Marshall Project, Mississippi Today, Mississippi Center for Investigative Reporting, Jackson Clarion-Ledger, USA Today	"Mississippi's Dangerous and Dysfunctional Penal System."
2020	Staffs of the listed publications	The Arizona Republic, USA Today, and the Center for Public Integrity	"Copy. Paste. Legislate"
2019	J. David McShane and Andrew Chavez	The Dallas Morning News	"Pain and Profit"
2018	Nina Martin and Renee Montagne	ProPublica and NPR	"Lost Mothers"
2017	Shane Bauer	Mother Jones	"My Four Months as a Private Prison Guard"
2016	Margie Mason, Robin McDowell, Martha Mendoza, and Esther Htusan	The Associated Press	"Seafood from Slaves"
2015	Carol Marbin Miller, Audra Burch, Mary Ellen Klas, Emily Michot, Kara Dapena and Lazaro Gamio	Miami Herald	"Innocents Lost"
2014	Chris Hamby, Ronnie Greene, Jim Morris and Chris Zubak-Skees (Center for Public Integrity); Matthew Mosk, Brian Ross and Rhonda Schwartz (ABC News)	Center for Public Integrity and ABC News	"Breathless and Burdened: Dying from Black Lung, Buried by Law and Medicine"
2013	Patricia Callahan, Sam Roe and Michael Hawthorne	Chicago Tribune	"Playing with Fire"
2012	Matt Apuzzo, Adam Goldman, Eileen Sullivan and Chris Hawley	Associated Press	"NYPD Intelligence Division"
2011	Marshall Allen and Alex Richards	Las Vegas Sun	"Do No Harm: Hospital Care in Las Vegas"
2010	Raquel Rutledge	Milwaukee Journal Sentinel	"Cashing In on Kids"
2009	Debbie Cenziper and Sarah Cohen	The Washington Post	"Forced Out"
2008	Barton Gellman and Jo Becker	The Washington Post	"Angler: The Cheney Vice Presidency"
2007	Charles Forelle, James Bandler and Mark Maremont	The Wall Street Journal	Stock manipulation series
2006	James Risen and Eric Lichtblau	The New York Times	"Domestic Spying"
2005	Diana B. Henriques	The New York Times	"Captive Clientele"
2004	David Barstow, Lowell Bergman, and David Rummel	The New York Times and Frontline	"Dangerous Business: When Workers Die"
2003	Staff of the publication	Boston Globe	"Crisis in the Catholic Church"
2002	Duff Wilson and David Heath	The Seattle Times	
2001	Karen Dillon	Kansas City Star	"To Protect and Defend"
2000	Donald Barlett and James Steele	Time	"What Corporate Welfare Costs"
1999	A team of reporters	The Miami Herald	"Dirty Votes: The Race for Miami Mayor"
1998	Duff Wilson	The Seattle Times	"Fear in the Fields — How Hazardous Wastes Become Fertilizer"
1998	Michael Duffy, Michael Weisskopf, and Viveca Novak	Time	"Abuse of Campaign Finance Laws"
1997	Glenn Bunting, Rich Connell, Maggie Farley, Sara Fritz, Evelyn Iritani, Connie Kang, Jim Mann, Alan Miller, and Rone Tempest	Los Angeles Times	"Illegal Democratic Campaign Contributions"
1996	Russell Carollo, Carol Hernandez, Jeff Nesmith, and Cheryl Reed	The Dayton Daily News	"Military Secrets" and "Prisoners on Payroll"
1995	Lizette Alvarez and Lisa Getter	The Miami Herald	"Lost in America: Our Failed Immigration Policy"
1994	Neill Borowski and Gilbert Gaul	The Philadelphia Inquirer	"Warehouses of Wealth: The Tax-Free Economy"
1993	Douglas Frantz and Murray Waas	Los Angeles Times	Policies prior to the Gulf War series

== Nominees ==
News organization	Reporter	Title	Year	Summary
The Atlanta Journal-Constitution	Carrie Teegardin, Danny Robbins, Ariel Hart, Jeff Ernsthausen, Alan Judd, Johnny Edwards	"Doctors & Sex Abuse"	2017	
Chicago Tribune	Sam Roe, Karisa King, Ray Long	"Dangerous Doses"	2017	
Los Angeles Times	David S. Cloud	"California National Guard Enlistment Bonus Scandal"	2017	
Sarasota Herald-Tribune	Josh Salman, Emily Le Coz, Elizabeth Johnson	"Bias on the Bench"	2017	
The Wall Street Journal	John Carreyrou, Christopher Weaver, Michael Siconolfi	"The Downfall of Theranos"	2017	
The Guardian US	Jon Swaine, Oliver Laughland, Jamiles Lartey, Ciara McCarthy	"The Counted"	2016	
InsideClimate News	Neela Banerjee, John H. Cushman Jr., David Hasemyer, Lisa Song	"Exxon: The Road Not Taken"	2016	
The New York Times	Jessica Silver-Greenberg, Michael Corkery, Robert Gebeloff	"Beware the Fine Print"	2016	
Tampa Bay Times	Michael LaForgia, Cara Fitzpatrick, Lisa Gartner	"Failure Factories"	2016	
The Washington Post	The Washington Post staff	"Fatal Shooting by Police"	2016	
The Boston Globe	Thomas Farragher, Jonathan Saltzman, Jenn Abelson, Casey Ross, Todd Wallack	"Shadow Campus"	2015	
The Post and Courier	Jennifer Berry Hawes, Natalie Caula Hauff, Doug Pardue, Glenn Smith	"Till Death Do Us Part"	2015	
ProPublica and NPR	Justin Elliott, Jesse Eisinger, Laura Sullivan	"The Red Cross' Secret Disaster"	2015	
Reuters	Joan Biskupic, Janet Roberts, John Shiffman	"The Echo Chamber"	2015	
The Wall Street Journal	Christopher S. Stewart, Christopher Weaver, John Carreyrou, Tom McGinty, Anna Wilde Mathews, Rob Barry	"Medicare Unmasked"	2015	
Center for Public Integrity, ABC News	Chris Hamby, Ronnie Greene, Jim Morris, Chris Zubak-Skees, Matthew Mosk, Brian Ross, Rhonda Schwartz	Breathless and Burdened: Dying from Black Lung, Buried by Law and Medicine	2014	
International Consortium of Investigative Journalists		Secrecy for Sale: Inside the Global Offshore Money Maze	2014	
University of California's Berkeley Graduate School of Journalism, Center for Investigative Reporting, Frontline, Univisión Documentaries, KQED	Andrés Cediel, Bernice Yeung, Lowell Bergman, Lauren Rosenfeld, Grace Rubenstein, Stephanie Mechura, Ariane Wu	Rape in the Fields/Violación de un Sueño	2014	
Miami New Times	Tim Elfrink	Biogenesis: Steroids, Baseball and an Industry Gone Wrong	2014	
Milwaukee Journal Sentinel	Ellen Gabler, Mark Johnson, John Fauber, Allan James Vestal, Kristyna Wentz-Graff	Deadly Delays	2014	
The Wall Street Journal	Michael M. Phillips	The Lobotomy Files	2014	
Reuters	Scot Paltrow, Kelly Carr	Unaccountable	2014	United States Department of Defense bookkeeping
Chicago Tribune	Patricia Callahan, Sam Roe, Michael Hawthorne	Playing with Fire	2013	
The Atlanta Journal-Constitution	Alan Judd, Heather Vogell, John Perry, M.B. Pell	Cheating Our Children	2013	
Center for Public Integrity, Global Integrity, Public Radio International, Investigative News Network		State Integrity Investigation	2013	Corruption in U.S. state governments
Los Angeles Times	Jason Felch, Kim Christensen and members of the Los Angeles Times staff	The Shame of the Boy Scouts	2013	
The New York Times	Charles Duhigg, Keith Bradsher, David Barboza, David Segal and David Kocieniewski	The iEconomy	2013	
The New York Times	David Barstow	Wal-Mart Abroad	2013	
Associated Press	Matt Apuzzo, Adam Goldman, Eileen Sullivan and Chris Hawley	NYPD Intelligence Division	2012	
ABC News 20/20	Brian Ross, Anna Schecter and the ABC News Investigative Team	Peace Corps: A Trust Betrayed	2012	
	Jim Morris, Ronnie Greene, Chris Hamby and Keith Epstein, Center for Public Integrity and Elizabeth Shogren, Howard Berkes, Sandra Bartlett and Susanne Reber, National Public Radio	Poisoned Places: Toxic Air, Neglected Communities	2012	
KHOU-TV (CBS Houston)	Mark Greenblatt, David Raziq and Keith Tomshe	A Matter of Risk: Radiation, Drinking Water, and Deception	2012	
The New York Times	Danny Hakim and Russell Buettner	Abused and Used	2012	
ProPublica, The Washington Post	Dafna Linzer, Jennifer LaFleur	Presidential Pardons	2012	
Bloomberg News	Bradley Keoun, Phil Kuntz, Bob Ivry, Craig Torres, Scott Lanman and Christopher Condon	The Fed's Trillion-Dollar Secret	2012	
Las Vegas Sun	Marshall Allen and Alex Richards	Do No Harm: Hospital Care in Las Vegas	2011	
Los Angeles Times	Jeff Gottlieb, Ruben Vives and The Los Angeles Times Staff	Breach of Faith	2011	
National Public Radio	Laura Sullivan and Steven Drummond	Behind the Bail Bond System	2011	
	ProPublica: Jesse Eisinger, Jake Bernstein; Planet Money, National Public Radio: Adam Davidson; This American Life, Chicago Public Radio: Ira Glass and Alex Blumberg	Betting Against the American Dream – The Wall Street Money Machine	2011	
San Jose Mercury News	Karen de Sá	Sponsored Bills in Sacramento	2011	
The Washington Post	Dana Priest, William Arkin	Top Secret America	2011	Top Secret America
Milwaukee Journal Sentinel	Raquel Rutledge	Cashing In on Kids	2010	
The Boston Globe	Sean P. Murphy	Gaming the System: Public Pensions the Massachusetts Way	2010	
KHOU–TV, Houston, TX	Mark Greenblatt, David Raziq, Keith Tomshe, Robyn Hughes and Chris Henao	Under Fire: Discrimination and Corruption in the Texas National Guard	2010	
The News & Observer (Raleigh, NC)	J. Andrew Curliss and Staff	Executive Privilege: The Perks of Power	2010	
ProPublica and The Nation Institute	A.C. Thompson in collaboration with Gordon Russell, Laura Maggi and Brendan McCarthy, The New Orleans Times-Picayune and Tom Jennings, Frontline]	Law and Disorder	2010	
The Washington Post	Joe Stephens, Lena H. Sun and Lyndsey Layton	Death on the Rails	2010	
The Washington Post	Debbie Cenziper and Sarah Cohen	Forced Out	2009	
The Charlotte Observer	Ames Alexander, Kerry Hall, Franco Ordonez, Ted Mellnik and Peter St. Onge	The Cruelest Cuts: The Human Cost of Bringing Poultry to Your Table	2009	
Detroit Free Press	Jim Schaefer, M.L. Elrick and Detroit Free Press staff	A Mayor in Crisis	2009	
The New York Times	David Barstow	Message Machine	2009	
Pittsburgh Post-Gazette	Patricia Sabatini and Len Boselovic	Degree of Influence: Academic Corruption at West Virginia University	2009	
ProPublica	Abrahm Lustgarten	Buried Secrets: Is Natural Gas Drilling Endangering U.S. Water Supplies?	2009	
The Washington Post	Barton Gellman and Jo Becker	Angler: The Cheney Vice Presidency	2008	
The Nation	Joshua Kors	Thanks for Nothing	2008	
The New York Times	Walter Bogdanich and Jake Hooker	A Toxic Pipeline	2008	
The Palm Beach Post	Tom Dubocq	Palm Beach County's Culture of Corruption	2008	
The Salt Lake Tribune	Loretta Tofani	American Imports, Chinese Deaths	2008	
Washington Post	Dana Priest and Anne Hull	The Other Walter Reed	2008	
The Wall Street Journal	Charles Forelle, James Bandler and Mark Maremont	Stock Option Abuses	2007	
The Boston Globe	Walter V. Robinson, Michael Rezendes, Beth Healy, Francie Latour, Heather Allen	Debtors' Hell	2007	
Los Angeles Times	Charles Ornstein and Tracy Weber	Transplant Patients at Risk	2007	
Miami Herald	Debbie Cenziper	House of Lies	2007	
Seattle Times	Ken Armstrong, Justin Mayo and Steve Miletich	Your Courts, Their Secrets	2007	
The Washington Post	Dan Morgan, Gilbert M. Gaul and Sarah Cohen	Harvesting Cash	2007	
The New York Times	James Risen and Eric Lichtblau	Domestic Spying	2006	
The Blade	Joshua Boak, James Drew, Steve Eder, Christopher D. Kirkpatrick, Jim Tankersley and Mike Wilkinson	Uncovering 'Coingate'	2006	
Copley News Service	Marcus Stern and Jerry Kammer	Randy 'Duke' Cunningham	2006	
Los Angeles Times	Evelyn Larrubia, Robin Fields and Jack Leonard	Guardians for Profit	2006	
The Washington Post	Susan Schmidt, James V. Grimaldi and R. Jeffrey Smith	The Abramoff Scandal	2006	
The Washington Post	Dana Priest	The CIA's Secret War Against Terrorism	2006	
The New York Times	Nicholas D. Kristof	The Genocide in Darfur	2006	
The New York Times	Diana Henriques	Captive Clientele	2005	
The Atlanta Journal-Constitution	Paul Donsky and Ken Foskett	Wired for Waste	2005	
Atlantic Monthly	James Fallows	Blind into Baghdad	2005	
The Oregonian	Steve Suo and Erin Hoover Barnett	Unnecessary Epidemic	2005	
The Seattle Times	Ken Armstrong, Florangela Davila and Justin Mayo	The Empty Promise of an Equal Defense	2005	
WFAA-TV, Dallas, TX	Brett Shipp and Mark Smith	State of Denial	2005	
Frontline and the BBC		Ghosts of Rwanda	2005	
The New York Times, Frontline, and the Canadian Broadcasting Corporation	David Barstow, Lowell Bergman, David Rummel and Neil Doherty	Dangerous Business: When Workers Die	2004	
The Dayton Daily News	Russell Carollo and Mei-Ling Hopgood	Casualties of Peace	2004	
	Staff of the Gannett New Jersey Newspaper	Profiting from Public Service	2004	
Los Angeles Times	Chuck Neubauer, Richard T. Cooper, Judy Pasterna	The Senators' Sons	2004	
The Washington Post	Joe Stephens, David B. Ottaway	Big Green	2004	
WTVF-TV, Nashville, TN	Phil Williams, Bryan Staples	Friends in High Places: Perks of Power	2004	
The Boston Globe	Matt Carroll, Kevin Cullen, Thomas Farragher, Stephen Kurkjian, Michael Paulson, Sacha Pfeiffer, Michael Rezendes, Walter V. Robinson	Crisis in the Catholic Church	2003	Sexual abuse scandal in the Catholic archdiocese of Boston
Dayton Daily News	Mike Wagner, Ben Sutherly, Laura Bischoff, Ken McCall, Dal Dempsey and Martha Hild	Down on the Factory: Cheap Food, Hidden Cost	2003	
The New York Times	David Cay Johnston	Tax Cheats	2003	
National Public Radio	Steve Inskeep	Oruzgan Raid	2003	
WFAA-TV, Dallas, TX	Brett Shipp and Mark Smith	Fake Drugs, Real Lives	2003	
Wisconsin State Journal	Phil Brinkman, Dee J. Hall, Scott Milfred	Corruption in the Wisconsin Capitol	2003	
The Seattle Times	Duff Wilson and David Heath	Uninformed Consent	2002	
Knight Ridder Washington Bureau	Sumana Chatterjee and Susarsan Raghavan	A Taste of Slavery	2002	
Los Angeles Times	Bob Drogin, Josh Meyer, Craig Pyes, William C. Rempel, Sebastian Rotella	Revealing Terrorism	2002	
Los Angeles Times	David Willman	The New FDA: Partnership With Deadly Risk	2002	
Orlando Sentinel	Sean Holton, et al.	Exposing the Flaws	2002	
The Washington Post	David S. Fallis, Craig Whitlock and April Witt	A Blue Wall of Silence — False Confessions	2002	
Kansas City Star	Karen Dillon	To Protect and Collect	2001	
Chicago Tribune	Ken Armstrong and Steve Mills	The Failure of the Death Penalty in Illinois and State of Execution: The Death Penalty in Texas	2001	
NBC 5 Chicago (WMAQ-TV)	Renee Ferguson	Strip-Searched at O'Hare	2001	
Orange County Register	Mark Katches, William Heisel, Ronald Campbell, Sharon Henry, Michael Goulding, Rebecca Allen and Tracy Wood	The Body Brokers	2001	
ABC News, World News Tonight	Brian Ross, Rhonda Schwartz, Vic Walter, Jill Rackmill, David Scott, Dawn Goeb, Jud Marvin, Gary Fairman, John Detarzio, Dow Haynor, Stuart Schutzman, Paul Slavin and Paul Friedman	The Money Trail	2001	
Seattle Post-Intelligencer	Andrew Schneider, Carol Smith	Uncivil Action	2001	
Time	Donald Barlett and James Steele	What Corporate Welfare Costs	2000	
Chicago Tribune	Ken Armstrong, Maurice J. Possley	Trial & Error	2000	
Associated Press	Sang-Hun Choe, Charles J. Hanley, Randy Herschaft and Martha Mendoza	The Bridge at No Gun Ri	2000	No Gun Ri Massacre
The Blade	Sam Roe	Deadly Alliance	2000	
Boston Globe	Robert Whitaker, Dolores Kong	Doing Harm: Research on the Mentally Ill	2000	
Los Angeles Times	David G. Willman	Rezulin: A Billion-Dollar Killer	2000	
Miami Herald	A team of reporters	Dirty Votes: The Race for Miami Mayor	1999	
St. Louis Post-Dispatch	William Allen, Kim Bell, and Andrew Skolnick	Health Care Behind Bars	1999	
Baltimore Sun	Will Englund, Gary Cohn	The Shipbreakers	1999	
The Wall Street Journal	Alix M. Freedman	Population Bomb	1999	
The Washington Post	Bart Gellman	Shell Games: The Search for Iraq's Hidden Weapons	1999	
Newsweek	Michael Isikoff	President Clinton and the Monica Lewinsky Scandal	1999	
The Seattle Times	Duff Wilson	Fear in the Fields — How Hazardous Wastes Become Fertilizer	1998	
Time	Michael Duffy, Michael Weisskopf, Viveca Novak	Abuse of Campaign Finance Laws	1998	
Cape Cod Times	Anne Brennan, William A. Mills	Broken Trust: The Failed Cleanup at the Massachusetts Military Reservation	1998	
Chicago Sun-Times	Chuck Neubauer, Charles Nicodemus	Investigation into Chicago City Hall Ethics Abuses	1998	
The New York Times	Martin Gotttlieb, Kurt Eichenwald, Josh Barbanel and Tamar Lewin	Health Care's Giant	1998	
The Philadelphia Inquirer	Loretta Tofani, Jeffrey Fleishman	Inside Tibet: A Country Tortured	1998	
Los Angeles Times	Glenn Bunting, Rich Connell, Maggie Farley, Sara Fritz, Evelyn Iritani, Connie Kang, Jim Mann, Alan Miller and Rone Tempest	Illegal Democratic Campaign Contributions	1997	
The Wall Street Journal	Jill Abramson, Helene Cooper, Phil Kuntz, Michael Moss, Glenn Simpson, Peter Waldman, John Wilke	Foreign Contributions Riddle	1997	
Times Picayune	Chris Adams	Of Pain and Gain	1997	
Kansas City Star	Joe Stephens	Ill-gotten Gains?	1997	
Cleveland Plain Dealer	Elizabeth Marchak	FAA: Safety Comes Second	1997	
The Boston Globe	Charles Sennott	Armed for Profit: The Selling of U.S. Weapons	1997	
Dayton Daily News	Russell Carollo, Carol Hernandez, Jeff Nesmith, Cheryl Reed	Military Secrets and Prisoners on Payroll	1996	
The New York Times	Ralph Blumenthal, Adam Bryant, Stephen Engleberg, Douglas Frantz and Matthew Wald	The FAA, USAir and the ATR Turbo Prop Planes	1996	
The Baltimore Sun	Gary Cohn and Ginger Thompson	Honduras	1996	
Star Tribune	Sharon Schmickle, Tom Hamburger	Who Owns the Law? West Publishing and the Courts	1996	
Sun-Sentinel	Fred Schulte and Jenni Bergal	Profits from Pain	1996	
Miami Herald	Lizette Alvarez, Lisa Getter	Lost in America: Our Failed Immigration Policy	1995	
ABC News, Day One	Walt Bogdanich	Smoke Screen, Parts I and II	1995	
The Dallas Morning News	Susan Feeney and Steve McGonigle	Voting Rights: The Next Generation	1995	
The Washington Post	Dan Morgan	How Medicaid Grew	1995	
Chicago Sun-Times	Chuck Neubauer, Mark Brown, Michael Briggs	The Rostenkowski Investigation	1995	
U.S. News & World Report	Joseph Shapiro, Penny Loeb, Susan Headden, Dave Bowermaster, Andrea Wright and Tom Toch	Separate and Unequal	1995	
The Philadelphia Inquirer	Neill Borowski and Gilbert Gaul	Warehouses of Wealth: The Tax-Free Economy	1994	
Scripps Howard News Service	Lisa Hoffman and Andrew Schneider	Home Infusion: Medicine's New Vein of Gold	1994	
The Washington Post	Athelia Knight	Murder on Trial	1994	
The Dallas Morning News	Randy Lee Loftis and Craig Flournoy	Race and Risk: HUD's $67 Million Plan and Housing Deal	1994	
Scripps Howard News Service	Andrew Schnieder, Peter Brown	FDIC: Protector Turned Predator	1994	
Cleveland Plain Dealer	Ted Wendling and Dave Davis	Lethal Doses: Radiation That Kills	1994	
Los Angeles Times	Douglas Frantz, Murray Waas	Series on Iraqgate	1993	
The Seattle Times	David Boardman, Susan Gilmore, Eric Nalder, and Eric Pryne	Series on charges of sexual misconduct against former Senator Brock Adams	1993	

== See also ==
- Investigative journalism
- Shorenstein Center on Media, Politics and Public Policy
- Goldsmith Book Prize
- Project On Government Oversight
- Government Accountability Office
