= Russell Carollo =

American journalist (1955–2018)

- Born: March 16, 1955; New Orleans, Louisiana
- Died: December 19, 2018 (aged 63); Switzerland
- Education: Louisiana State University; Southeastern Louisiana University
- Occupations: Journalist; Special projects reporter
- Known for: 1998 Pulitzer Prize for National Reporting
- Parent(s): Victor and Norma Carollo

Russell John Carollo (March 16, 1955 – December 19, 2018) was an American Pulitzer prize-winning journalist, who worked as an investigative reporter for numerous publications, including the Dayton Daily News, the Los Angeles Times, and The Sacramento Bee.

He shared the 1998 Pulitzer Prize for National Reporting, with Jeff Nesmith, at the Dayton Daily News for uncovering mismanagement in military healthcare. After publication of the series of stories, the Pentagon announced the creation of a civilian board to review malpractice cases.

Carollo was a three-time finalist for the Pulitzer prize, in 1992, with Mike Casey, for his work on, "Lives on the Line," in 1996, with Carol Hernandez, Jeff Nesmith and Cheryl Reed, for his contributions on two articles, "Military Secrets" and "Prisoners on the Payroll," and in 2002 for "The Foreign Game."

In 2004, Carollo and Mei-Ling Hopgood, were the recipients of the Edgar A. Poe Award, the Daniel Pearl Award for Outstanding International Investigative Reporting, the Clark Mollenhoff award, and were finalists for the Goldsmith Prize for Investigative Reporting, for the series of investigative reports, "Casualties of Peace," published in 2003. The House Committee on International Relations passed of a bill to protect the safety of Peace Corps volunteers as a result of the series.

His specialties included computer-assisted reporting, state public records, the military, and long-term investigative projects, and use of the Freedom of Information Act (FOIA), which he used to make between 75 and 150 requests and appeals each year. During his 30-year career, Carollo reported from at least seventeen countries.

== Background and education ==
Carollo was a native of Lacombe in St. Tammany Parish in suburban New Orleans, Louisiana. His parents, Victor and Norma Carollo, were American-Italians; his father was a veteran, having served during World War II.

Carollo graduated from Louisiana State University with a bachelor's degree in journalism, and from Southeastern Louisiana University with a bachelor's degree in history. in 2009, Carollo taught journalism at Colorado College and Oklahoma State University.

Carollo was a former Michigan Journalism Fellow, class of 1989–1990. During his studies, he focused on First Amendment rights and improving his writing, saying that the program had given him time to look at "really good writing" and that the fellowship program helped to give him a "more global view." Louisiana State University inducted him into its Journalism Hall of Fame in 2009.

== Career ==
Carollo worked as a special projects reporter for the Sacramento Bee, the Los Angeles Times, and beginning in 1990, the Dayton Daily News. At the time of his death, Carollo worked as a freelance journalist and consultant based out of Colorado.

His specialties included computer-assisted reporting, state public records, the military, and long-term investigative projects.

He was also adept at using the Freedom of Information Act (FOIA), which he used to make between 75 and 150 requests and appeals a year. In a 2006 question and answer session, before the Reporters Committee for Freedom of the Press, he stated that he spent at least half of his day filing, taking phone calls, and appealing FOIA requests, and examining the information he received.

Carollo was a finalist for the Pulitzer prize, in 1992, with Mike Casey, for his work on, "Lives on the Line," in 1996, with Carol Hernandez, Jeff Nesmith and Cheryl Reed, for his contributions on two articles, "Military Secrets" and "Prisoners on the Payroll," and in 2002 for "The Foreign Game."

=== 1998: Unnecessary Danger series ===
While working in Spokane, Washington, Carollo heard about a doctor in the military who had been accused of a crime, and subsequently, that military doctors do not need to be certified in the state where they practice. Later, Carollo and colleague Jeff Nesmith, began an investigation into the military healthcare system, concerned that a standard that low, "would result in hurting a lot of people," and "attract doctors with problems practicing in a civilian system." Carollo, discovered his concerns were not unfounded.

In the fall of 1997, the Dayton Daily News, published a series of seven stories, titled, "Unnecessary Danger," written by Carollo and colleague, Jeff Nesmith, reporting on flaws in the military's health care system and protections that specifically protected the military from lawsuits over medical malpractice such as the 1950 Feres doctrine and the 1943 Military Claims Act. An example of how the Feres doctrine protected a military physician was described in the last report in the series:

"Myrna J. Keith wants justice, but she can't get it.

Her 25-year-old son died after he went to a military clinic for a bee sting and got nine times the dosage of a drug ordered by the doctor.

The only physician on duty that day had just completed his internship, had no medical license and had just arrived at the clinic the month before.

The head nurse was not certified in advanced life-support techniques, and an essential piece of emergency equipment was missing a part. Other emergency equipment at the clinic was outdated, unsterilized or in a basement."

— Russell Carollo and Jeff Nesmith, Laws and Rulings Shield Doctors, Dayton Daily News

The Feres doctrine, adopted during World War II, was still being used during peacetime, to protect the military's hospitals, clinics and the people who work there.

The first article in the series explained, "Congress in 1986 passed a law prohibiting the release of any information about the quality of military doctors. Many states have similar laws, intended to encourage open discussions among doctors. But the military uses the federal law to protect the same types of information state medical boards release every day." During the year-long investigation, Carollo and Nesmith found 200 doctors that were "linked to incompetence and malpractice," including one doctor accused of malpractice 15 times over 14-years. The doctor had been installed as the hospital commander in Germany.

The full series of reports outlined how the military system failed to meet the same standards and safeguards enjoyed by the civilian population to include allowing military doctors to practice healthcare without state medical licences; these flaws sometimes led to injury and death. The first article in the series was published on October 5, 1997. The series of stories is listed below.

- Flawed and Sometimes Deadly, October 5, 1997.
- The Needle went Wrong, October 6, 1997.
- Too Many Patients Too Little Time, October 7, 1997.
- Special Licences for Some Doctors, October 8, 1997.
- Double Standards of Care, October 9, 1997.
- The Man in the White Coat was no Doctor, October 10, 1997.
- Laws and Rulings Shield Doctors, October 11, 1997.

The project won the 1998 Pulitzer Prize for National Reporting. The Associated Press, reported on April 14, 1998, that "after the series was published, the military promised Congress it would make more than a dozen changes to its medical system, and the Pentagon announced the creation of a civilian board to review malpractice cases."

=== 2003: Casualties of Peace series ===
From October 26 through November 1, 2003, the Dayton Daily News (DDN) began publishing a seven-part series, "Casualties of Peace." The stories were the result of a two-year investigation into the violence, including rape and murder, against Peace Corps volunteers. Once the DDN agreed they had a project, they hired Christine Willmsem and assigned her to the project, however, she left to work for The Seattle Times; Mei-Ling Hopgood, one of their Washington correspondents, joined Carollo on the project. Carollo, already experienced in covering overseas projects, and Hopgood, having been with the Dayton Daily News since 2001, were the lead writers on the project.

They traveled to 11 countries, and interviewed more than 500 people as part of their investigation, learning that many volunteers were sent to some of the most dangerous areas of different countries, with little, to no, training or supervision. Additionally, as part of their research, Carollo made over 75 FOIA request and appeals with the Peace Corps, the FBI, the Department of State, the Department of Justice and the Drug Enforcement Administration. Carollo and Hopgood, reviewed thousands of records, including information from the Deaths in Service Database, of Peace Corps volunteers. Met with "a wall of resistance," from the Peace Corps spokesperson, the DDN, was forced to sue for the release of Corps documents logging assaults made on their volunteers. During their interviews and research, they discovered the organization recorded assault and rape as "incidents" or "events," rather than crimes.

After careful analysis of the data they had compiled, they found that volunteers were assaulted or robbed every 23 hours, and the Peace Corps was "run in a way that would seem ridiculous to any business," for example: volunteers were put in positions of teaching farmers how to grow crops, in a country they had just arrived in, when they "had never grown a flower." Two days before the DDN published the investigative series, Mei-Ling Hopgood reported that Peace Corps Director, Gaddi Vasquez, was resigning his position, effective, November 14.

Following the publication of the series, the Peace Corps claimed the reporting was inaccurate, without citing any factual errors in the stories, instead, they criticized the DDN motives for reporting the stories. As a result of the reports, the House Committee on International Relations, held a hearing on March 24, resulting in the passage of a bill to better protect the safety of Peace Corps volunteers, six days later. In 2011, after the death of a Peace Corps volunteer in Africa, a bill, the Kate Puzey Volunteer Protection Act, to protect whistleblowers at the Peace Corps, and improve protections for the victims of violence and sexual assault.

Carrollo and Hopgood were awarded the Edgar A. Poe award, the Daniel Pearl award, and the Clark Mollenhoff Award for investigative reporting for the series. The series of articles are archived on the Dayton Daily News website.

== Awards and recognition ==
- 1991 Winner, John Hancock Award for Excellence in Business Writing, (with Mike Casey) Dayton Daily News, "Lives on the Line," a 5-part series on worker safety in America
- 1992 Finalist, Pulitzer Prize for Public Service, (with Mike Casey) Dayton Daily News, "Violators: How they Stacked Up", a 5-part series on worker safety in America.
- 1995 Winner, Investigative Reporters and Editors Medal, (with Jeff Nesmith and Carol Hernandez) Dayton Daily News, "Military Secrets"
- 1996 Finalist, Pulitzer Prize for National Reporting, (with Carol Hernandez, Jeff Nesmith and Cheryl Reed) Dayton Daily News, "Military Secrets" and "Prisoners on the Payroll", investigations into handling misconduct cases in the military.
- 1996 Winner, Harvard University's Goldsmith Prize for Investigative Reporting, (with Carol Hernandez, Jeff Nesmith and Cheryl Reed) Dayton Daily News, "Military Secrets" and "Prisoners on the Payroll"
- 1998 Winner, Pulitzer Prize for National Reporting, for the seven-part series, "Unnecessary Danger," (with Jeff Nesmith) Dayton Daily News.
  External videos
  - Presentation of the Gerald R. Ford Journalism Awards, National Press Club, June 5, 2000, C-SPAN
- 1999 Winner of the Gerald R. Ford Prize for Distinguished Reporting on the National Defense, in recognition of his high standards for accuracy and substance. Presented by President Ford at the thirteenth annual awards ceremony.
- 2000 Outstanding Alumnus of the Year, Southeastern Louisiana University
- 2002 Finalist, Pulitzer Prize for Investigative Reporting, (with other staff members) Dayton Daily News, "The Foreign Game", for investigating recruitment of foreign athletes for American schools.
- 2004 Finalist, Harvard University's Goldsmith Prize, (with Mei-Ling Hopgood) Dayton Daily News, "Casualties of Peace" a nearly 2 year, 7-part series, investigating abuse, assault, and rape of volunteers with the Peace Corps.
- 2004 Winner of the Edgar A Poe Award, White House Correspondent's Association, (with Mei-Ling Hopgood) Dayton Daily News, "Casualties of Peace"
- 2004 Winner of the Clark Mollenhoff Award for Investigative Reporting, (with Mei-Ling Hopgood) Dayton Daily News, "Casualties of Peace"
- 2004 Daniel Pearl Award for Outstanding International Investigative Reporting, International Consortium of Investigative Journalists, (with Mei-Ling Hopgood) Dayton Daily News, "Casualties of Peace"
- 2009 Manship Hall of Fame, LSU Manship School of Mass Communication
