= David Heath (journalist) =

American journalist

David Heath (born 1959) is an American investigative journalist and author of "Longshot: The Inside Story of the Race for a COVID-19 Vaccine." He was a Senior Reporter at The Center for Public Integrity. He won the 2002 Goldsmith Prize for Investigative Reporting, with Duff Wilson, the 2001 George Polk Award, and two Gerald Loeb Awards: Large Newspapers in 2002 for "Uninformed Consent", and an Honorable Mention for Medium Newspapers in 2006 for "Selling Drug Secrets".

== Life ==
- He graduated from Grinnell College in 1981.
- He was a reporter at the Enid, Oklahoma News & Eagle, and the Fort Wayne News-Sentinel.
- He was a reporter for the Louisville Courier-Journal.
- He was an investigative reporter for The Seattle Times.
- In 2002, he was visiting writer at Grinnell College.
- He was a 2006 Harvard Nieman Fellow.
