= John Bare =

John Bare is a writer and U.S. foundation executive. Since 2004, he has worked as vice president of The Arthur M. Blank Family Foundation in Atlanta. He has published extensively on philanthropy and evaluation, including a 2004 book chapter with Michael Quinn Patton and a 2010 article that examined philanthropy, accountability and social change. Many of his articles are archived at a personal web site.

Bare is a contributor to the opinion section of CNN.com and an executive-in-residence at Georgia Tech's Institute for Leadership and Entrepreneurship.

He previously worked under Hodding Carter III at the John S. and James L. Knight Foundation in Miami, where he created the foundation's planning and evaluation department.

He studied journalism under Philip Meyer at the University of North Carolina at Chapel Hill, completing a Ph.D. in 1995 and publishing a chapter on the belief systems of journalists in a 1998 book, Assessing Public Journalism, edited by Meyer, Ed Lambeth and Esther Thorson. As a media consultant, Bare contributed to computer-assisted reporting projects at U.S. News & World Report, the Cleveland Plain Dealer and the Omaha World-Herald. From 1990-97, he wrote a weekly column for The Chapel Hill Herald and produced issue briefs for the National Center for Education Statistics.
