= Jeff Nesmith =

American journalist (1940–2023)

- Born: Hollis Jefferson Nesmith Jr. June 28, 1940; Hillsborough County, Florida, U.S.
- Died: January 13, 2023 (aged 82); Alexandria, Virginia, U.S.
- Education: University of Florida
- Occupation: Journalist
- Spouse: Achsah (Posey) Nesmith
- Children: Two
- Awards: Pulitzer Prize (1998)

Hollis Jefferson Nesmith Jr. (June 28, 1940 – January 13, 2023) was an American journalist and author. During his time at the Dayton Daily News, he won the 1998 Pulitzer Prize for National Reporting with Russell Carollo for uncovering mismanagement in military healthcare.

Nesmith graduated with his bachelor's degree from the University of Florida School of Journalism in 1963. He was the author of No Higher Honor, published in 1999, a history of the USS Yorktown, frequently referred to as "Uncle Joe's boat." Nesmith served on the Reporters Committee for Freedom of the Press steering committee from 1999 through 2002.

== Career ==
After graduation, Nesmith worked as a part-time reporter with the Plant City Courier in Florida and then taught 12th grade at Howey Academy from 1963 to 1964.

His first full-time job in the news business was as an obituary writer for the Atlanta Constitution. He continued with the Constitution as a reporter covering the police, city government, and state politics. By 1968, Nesmith was the assistant city editor at the Constitution. He briefly worked at the Philadelphia Evening Bulletin before the paper "crumbled," returning to work with Cox News Service at the Washington D.C. bureau. Nesmith worked on projects with the Dayton Daily News, one of three Ohio newspapers owned by Cox. In his last position with Cox, he served as Correspondent for Health and Science.

Nesmith was a finalist for the Pulitzer for national reporting in 1996, along with Carol Hernandez, Russell Carollo and Cheryl Reed, for his contributions on two articles, "Military Secrets" and "Prisoners on the Payroll."

=== 1998: Unnecessary Danger series ===
While working in Spokane, Washington, Nesmith and Russell Carollo heard about a doctor in the military who had been accused of a crime, and subsequently learned that military doctors were not required to be certified in the state where they practice. Nesmith (already a part of Cox Enterprises, owners of the Dayton Daily News), with Carollo, conducted a year-long investigation into the military healthcare system, concerned that such a low hiring standard "would result in hurting a lot of people," and "attract doctors with problems practicing in a civilian system."

In the fall of 1997, the Dayton Daily News published a series of seven stories titled "Unnecessary Danger" written by Nesmith and Carollo, reporting on flaws in the military's health care system and protections that specifically protected the military from lawsuits over medical malpractice such as the 1950 Feres doctrine and the 1943 Military Claims Act.

The first article in the series explained: "Congress in 1986 passed a law prohibiting the release of any information about the quality of military doctors. Many states have similar laws, intended to encourage open discussions among doctors. But the military uses the federal law to protect the same types of information state medical boards release every day." During the year-long investigation, Carollo and Nesmith found 200 doctors that were "linked to incompetence and malpractice," including one doctor installed as a hospital commander in Germany who had been accused of malpractice 15 times over 14 years.

The reports outlined how the military system failed to meet the same standards and safeguards enjoyed by the civilian population; these flaws sometimes led to injury and death. The first article in the series was published on October 5, 1997. The series of stories is listed below.

- Flawed and Sometimes Deadly, October 5, 1997.
- The Needle went Wrong, October 6, 1997.
- Too Many Patients Too Little Time, October 7, 1997.
- Special Licences for Some Doctors, October 8, 1997.
- Double Standards of Care, October 9, 1997.
- The Man in the White Coat was no Doctor, October 10, 1997.
- Laws and Rulings Shield Doctors, October 11, 1997.

The project won the 1998 Pulitzer Prize for National Reporting. In April 1998, the Associated Press reported that "after the series was published, the military promised Congress it would make more than a dozen changes to its medical system, and the Pentagon announced the creation of a civilian board to review malpractice cases."

== Personal ==
Hollis Jefferson Nesmith Jr. was born to parents Hollis Jefferson and Thetis Jefferson. He used his full name while writing for the Atlanta Constitution early in his career, deciding sometime after 1968 to be known as Jeff Nesmith.

In 1966, Nesmith married Achsah (Posey) Nesmith, a journalist and the first female speechwriter to serve a full term for a United States president, U.S. President Jimmy Carter. They had two children: Susannah Nesmith, a reporter and attorney based in Miami, and Jeff Nesmith, a designer and filmmaker based in Washington, D.C. The Nesmiths resided in Alexandria, Virginia.

Nesmith died of cancer on January 13, 2023, at the age of 82. Achsah died on March 5, 2024, at the age of 84.

== Awards and recognition ==
- 1995 Winner, Investigative Reporters and Editors Medal, (with Russell Carollo and Carol Hernandez) Dayton Daily News, "Military Secrets"
- 1996 Finalist, Pulitzer Prize for National Reporting, (with Carol Hernandez, Russell Carollo and Cheryl Reed) Dayton Daily News, "Military Secrets" and "Prisoners on the Payroll", investigations into handling misconduct cases in the military
- 1996 Winner, Harvard University's Goldsmith Prize for Investigative Reporting, (with Carol Hernandez, Russell Carollo and Cheryl Reed) Dayton Daily News, "Military Secrets" and "Prisoners on the Payroll"
- 1998 Winner, Pulitzer Prize for National Reporting, (with Russell Carollo) Dayton Daily News
- 2001 Winner, the Thomas L. Stokes Award for Best Energy and Environmental Writing
- 2002 Winner, the Society of Environmental Journalists Award for Reporting on the Environment
