= Carol Hernandez =

American journalist educator

- Education: Bachelor's degree, University of Florida; Master's degree, Stony Brook University
- Occupations: Journalist; Educator
- Employer: Stony Brook University
- Awards: Pulitzer Prize; Goldsmith Prize

Carol Hernandez is an American journalist educator from Miami, Florida. She currently teaches at Stony Brook University, in New York. She also teaches a seminar on global news.

During her reporting career, Hernandez has worked for the Dayton Daily News, Newsday, HealthDay News, the Miami Herald, The Atlanta Journal-Constitution and The Wall Street Journal.

While she worked at the Dayton Daily News, she shared the 1996 Goldsmith Prize for Investigative Reporting, and was a finalist for the 1996 Pulitzer Prize for National Reporting. In 1997, she shared the Pulitzer Prize for Spot News Reporting with the staff at Newsday.

Hernandez has her bachelor's degree in journalism from the University of Florida and a master's degree in education administration from Stony Brook University; in 2019, she was a candidate for a doctorate of education in organizational leadership at Northeastern University.

== Awards and recognition ==
- 1995 Winner, Investigative Reporters and Editors Medal, (with Russell Carollo and Jeff Nesmith) Dayton Daily News, "Military Secrets."
- 1996 Finalist, Pulitzer Prize for National Reporting, for investigations into handling misconduct cases in the military, (with Russell Carollo, Jeff Nesmith and Cheryl Reed) Dayton Daily News, "Military Secrets" and "Prisoners on the Payroll."
- 1996 Winner, Harvard University's Goldsmith Prize for Investigative Reporting, (with Russell Carollo, Jeff Nesmith and Cheryl Reed) Dayton Daily News, "Military Secrets" and "Prisoners on the Payroll."
- 1997 Winner, Pulitzer Prize for Spot News Reporting, with the staff of Newsday, for their series of stories covering the crash of TWA Flight 800 and the ensuing aftermath.
