= Nina Martin (journalist) =

Nina Martin is an American journalist, and reporter for Reveal. She won a 2017 George Polk Award, and 2018 Goldsmith Prize for Investigative Reporting.

== Life ==
She was a reporter for The Baltimore Sun, The Washington Post, the International Herald Tribune, and New York Magazine. She was an editor at San Francisco magazine. She was a reporter for ProPublica.
