= Michael Duffy (American journalist) =

American journalist and author

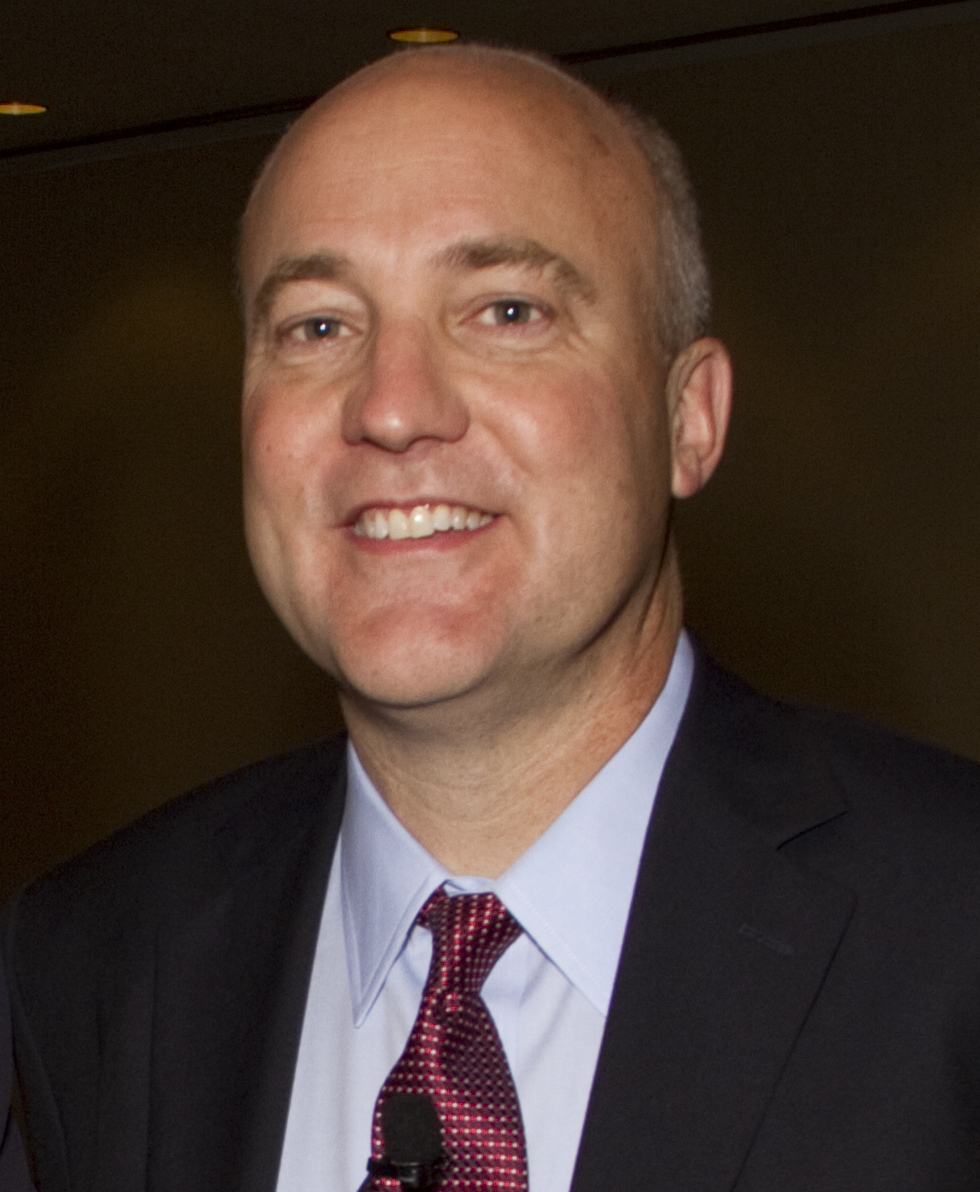
- Duffy in 2012
- Born: September 7, 1958 (age 67); Columbus, Ohio, U.S.
- Occupation: Journalist

Michael Wolf Duffy (born September 7, 1958) is a journalist and author. He is opinions editor at large for the Washington Post.

== Life ==
Born and raised in Columbus, Ohio, Duffy graduated from Oberlin College in 1980. He was a staff writer at Defense Week, and was Pentagon correspondent for Time, becoming Washington Bureau Chief from 1997 to 2005. He was a Ferris Professor of Journalism at Princeton University in 2006-07.

He appears on Charlie Rose and Washington Week.

He is married to Demetra Lambros.

== Awards and honors ==
- 1994 Gerald R. Ford award for distinguished reporting
- 1997 Joan Shorenstein Barone Prize for Investigative Journalism
- 1998 Goldsmith Prize for Investigative Reporting
- 2004 Gerald R. Ford award for distinguished reporting
- 2013 Chautauqua Prize, shortlist, The Presidents Club

== Works ==
- Duffy, Michael; Gibbs, Nancy (2012). The Presidents Club: Inside the World's Most Exclusive Fraternity. Simon & Schuster. ISBN 978-1-43912-770-4.
- Duffy, Michael; Gibbs, Nancy (2007). The Preacher and the Presidents: Billy Graham in the White House. Center Street. ISBN 978-1-59995-734-0.
- Duffy, Michael; Goodgame, Dan (1992). Marching in Place: the Status Quo Presidency of George Bush. Simon & Schuster. ISBN 978-0-671-73720-7.
