= Alex Richards (journalist) =

American journalist

- Occupation: journalist
- Known for: reporter for the Las Vegas Sun, The Chronicle of Higher Education
- Notable work: "Do No Harm", Las Vegas Sun
- Awards: 2011 Goldsmith Prize for Investigative Reporting

Alex Richards is an American journalist, who with Marshall Allen, won the 2011 Goldsmith Prize for Investigative Reporting. He is a professor of Magazine, News and Digital Journalism at the S.I. Newhouse School of Public Communications at Syracuse University.

== Life ==
He was a reporter for the Las Vegas Sun. The "Do No Harm" project was based on data mining, and analyzing hospital records turned over to the State of Nevada.

He is a reporter for The Chronicle of Higher Education.

== Works ==
- "Do No Harm", Las Vegas Sun
