= Lisa Getter =

American journalist

Lisa Getter is an American investigative journalist. She won the 1995 Goldsmith Prize for Investigative Reporting, with Lizette Alvarez. Her coverage of Hurricane Andrew contributed to the 1993 Pulitzer Prize for Public Service received by The Miami Herald, and she shared the 1999 Pulitzer Prize for Investigative Reporting, helping overturn the mayoral election for fraud. While at the Herald she was also a Pulitzer finalist for General News Reporting in 1989 and for Investigative Reporting in 1998.

== Life ==
After growing up in the suburbs of New York City where she attended W.C. Mepham High School, she graduated from Northwestern University, with a B.S. in journalism. At Northwestern she was one of three students who founded the literary magazine Helicon. Getter was an investigative reporter for The Miami Herald, and the Los Angeles Times and a 1995 Nieman Fellow at Harvard University. She has worked as a Committee of Concerned Journalists columnist and at Bloomberg Government, focusing on government influence on the financial sector. Getter has also served on the board of Investigative Reporters and Editors.
