= James Mann (writer) =

American journalist

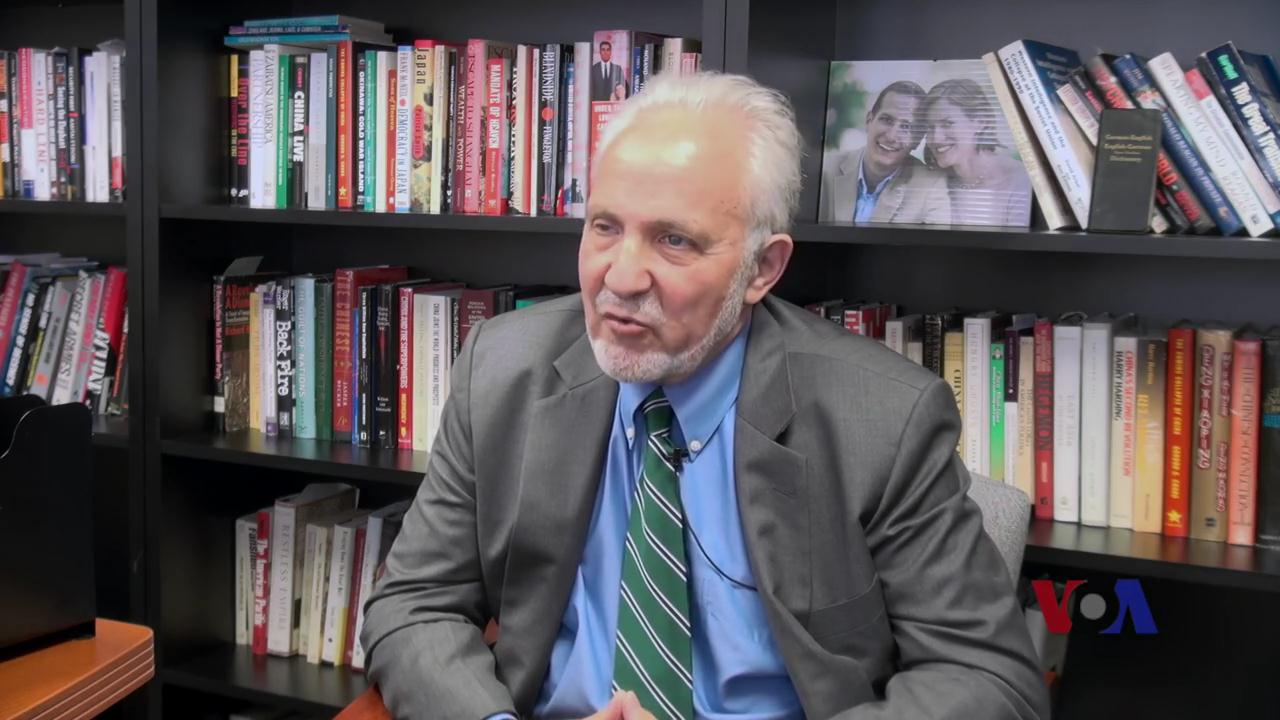
- James Mann interviews with VOA
- Born: Albany, New York, US
- Genre: journalism and non-fiction
- Subject: American foreign policy and China–United States relations
- Notable works: Rise of The Vulcans

James Mann (born 1946) is a Washington-based journalist and author. He has written a series of non-fiction books, including three about America's relationship with China and four more about American foreign policy. His group biography about George W. Bush's war cabinet, Rise of The Vulcans, was a New York Times best-seller. As a newspaper journalist, he worked for more than two decades for the Los Angeles Times, where he served as Supreme Court correspondent, Beijing bureau chief, and foreign-policy columnist. Earlier in his career, he worked at The Washington Post, where he took part in the newspaper's Watergate coverage.

== Life ==
Mann was born and raised in Albany, New York, where both his father Jay D. Mann and his grandfather Abraham Mann were local physicians. His mother, Peggy Lebair Mann, was the coach of women's tennis at the State University of New York at Albany, as well as a longtime tennis umpire who officiated at both the U.S. Open and at Wimbledon. Mann graduated from Harvard University in 1968 with a BA in sociology. During his 33-year newspaper career, he worked for the New Haven Journal-Courier, The Washington Post, The Philadelphia Inquirer, The Baltimore Sun, and the Los Angeles Times. He served as Chief of the Beijing bureau of the Los Angeles Times from 1984 to 1987.

His magazine articles have appeared in The New Republic, The Atlantic Monthly, The American Prospect, and The American Lawyer. His 1992 article, "Who Was Deep Throat?", was included in The Atlantic Monthly's collection, "The American Idea: The Best of The Atlantic Monthly: 150 Years of Writers and Thinkers Who Have Shaped Our History".

== Awards ==
- 1993; 1999 Edwin M. Hood Award for diplomatic correspondence, by the National Press Club
- 1997 Goldsmith Prize for Investigative Reporting
- 1999 Edward Weintal Prize for diplomatic reporting
- 2005 Berlin Prize
- 2000 New York Public Library Helen Bernstein book award.
- 2000 Asia Pacific Book Award (Japan)
- 2010 Ambassador Book Award of the English-Speaking Union

== Works ==
- Beijing Jeep. Simon & Schuster. 1989. ISBN 978-0-671-62027-1. "beijing jeep."; reprint Westview Press, 1997, ISBN 9780813333274. A case study of how one of the first American companies to enter the China market discovered the realities of how tough it is to do business there. In 2005, Fortune magazine included this book on its list of 75 all-time great books about business.
- About Face: A History of America's Curious Relationship With China From Nixon to Clinton, Alfred Knopf, 1999, ISBN 978-0-679-45053-5 A history of America's often-hidden hidden diplomacy with China. This book won the New York Public Library's Helen Bernstein and the Asia-Pacific Award; it was also short-listed as a finalist for the Lionel Gelber Prize.
- Rise of the Vulcans: The History of Bush's War Cabinet. Viking. 2004. ISBN 978-0-14-303489-6. A New York Times best-seller, this book was one of the finalists for the Arthur Ross book award of the Council on Foreign Relations.
- The China Fantasy: How Our Leaders Explain Away Chinese Repression. Penguin. 2007. ISBN 978-0-670-03825-1.; reprint Penguin Books, 2008, ISBN 978-0-14-311292-1
- The Rebellion of Ronald Reagan: A history of the end of the Cold War. Penguin. 2009. ISBN 978-0-670-02054-6. This book won the Ambassador Book Award of the English-Speaking Union.
- The Obamians: The Struggle Inside the White House to Redefine American Power. Viking. 2012.
- George W. Bush: The American Presidents Series: The 43rd President, 2001-2009. Henry Holt and Company, 2015 ISBN 978-0-8050-9397-1
- The Great Rift: Dick Cheney, Colin Powell, and the Broken Friendship That Defined an Era. Henry Holt and Company, 2020. ISBN 9781627797559
