= Philip Meyer =

American journalist and scholar (1930–2023)

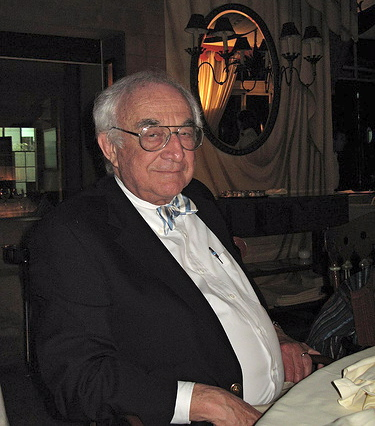
- Born: October 27, 1930; Deshler, Nebraska, U.S.
- Died: November 4, 2023 (aged 93); Carrboro, North Carolina, U.S.
- Education: Kansas State University; UNC-Chapel Hill
- Occupations: Journalist; professor

Philip Meyer (October 27, 1930 – November 4, 2023) was an American journalist and scholar who was a professor and holder of the Knight Chair in Journalism at the University of North Carolina at Chapel Hill. He researched in the areas of journalism quality, precision journalism, civic journalism, polling, the newspaper industry, and communications technology. Meyer received his undergraduate degree in technical journalism from Kansas State University (1952), a master's degree in political science from Chapel Hill (1958) and was a non-degree Nieman Fellow at Harvard University (1966–1967).

== Biography ==
Before becoming a professor in 1981, Meyer was employed in the newspaper industry for a total of 26 years, the last 23 with Knight Ridder, where he started as a reporter for the Miami Herald. In 1962, he became the Washington correspondent for the Akron Beacon Journal, then a national correspondent, and finally, from 1978 to 1981, the director of news research at company headquarters in Miami, where he worked on Knight Ridder's Viewtron online service.

One of the earliest examples of computer-assisted reporting was in 1967, after riots in Detroit, when Meyer, on temporary assignment with the Detroit Free Press, used survey research, analyzed on a mainframe computer, to show that people who had attended college were equally likely to have rioted as were high school dropouts.

The National Institute for Computer-Assisted Reporting hosts the annual Philip Meyer Journalism Award, which "recognize excellent journalism done using social science research methods".

Meyer was a member of Board of Contributors for USA TODAY's Forum Page, part of the newspaper's Opinion section.

The Summer 2008 Carolina Communicator includes a profile of Meyer, written by one of his former students, John Bare.

Meyer died of complications of Parkinson’s disease on November 4, 2023, at the age of 93.

== Bibliography ==
- Meyer, Philip (27 January 2012). Paper Route: Finding My Way to Precision Journalism. iUniverse. ISBN 978-1-4620-8310-7.
- Meyer, Philip (2004). The Vanishing Newspaper: Saving Journalism in the Information Age. University of Missouri Press. ISBN 978-0-8262-1561-1.
- Meyer, Philip (1991). The New Precision Journalism. Indiana University Press. ISBN 978-0-253-20664-0.
- Meyer, Philip (1987). Ethical journalism: a guide for students, practitioners, and consumers. Addison-Wesley Longman Limited. ISBN 978-0-582-28680-1.
- Meyer, Philip (1 January 1985). The Newspaper Survival Book: An Editor's Guide to Marketing Research. Indiana University Press. ISBN 978-0-253-15835-2.
- Meyer, Philip (1973). Precision Journalism. A Reporter's Introduction to Social Science Methods (1st ed.). Indiana University Press. ISBN 0-253-20163-2.
