= Michael Weisskopf =

American journalist

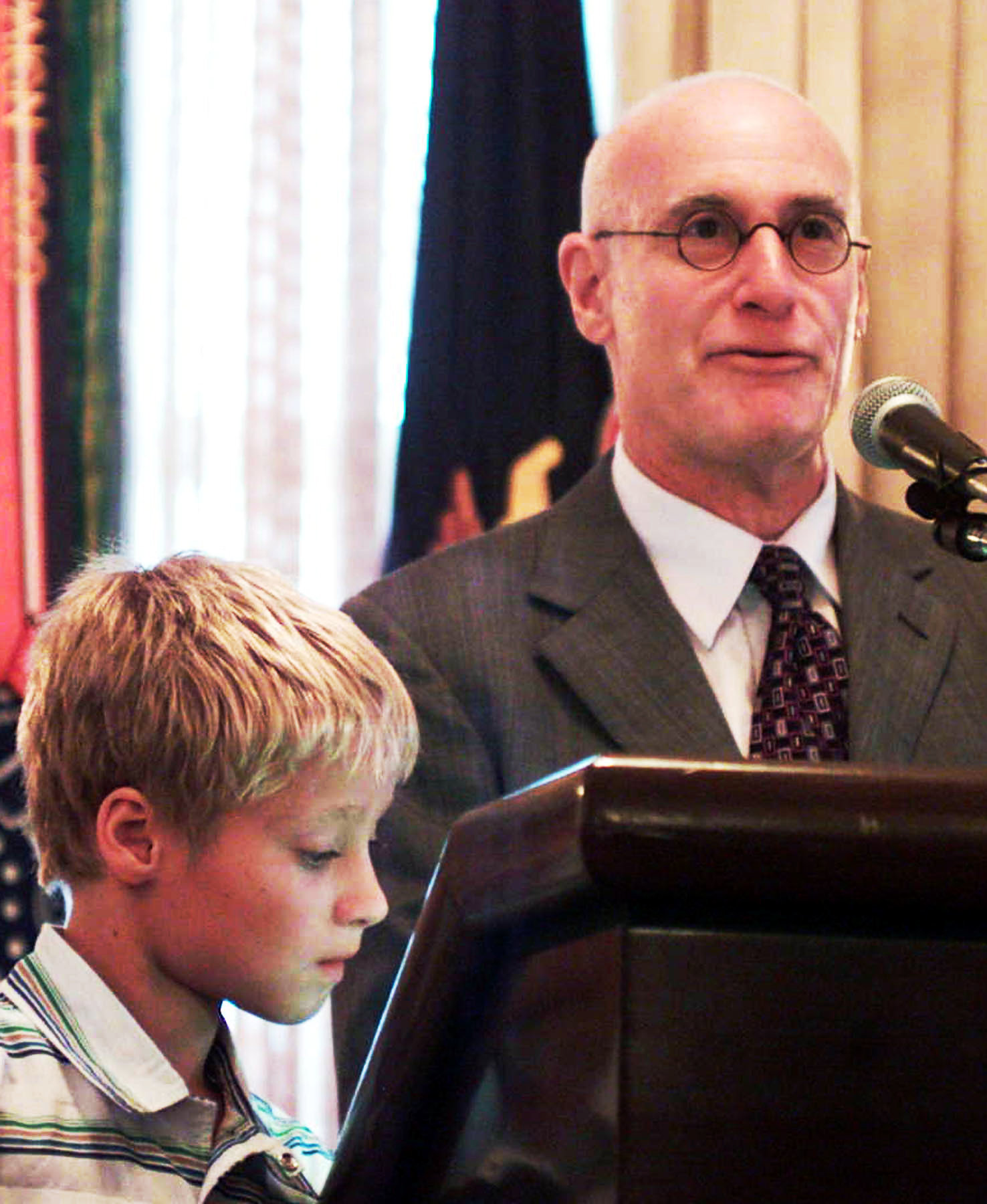
- Weisskopf (with his son) on 19 August 2004, accepting the Fourth Estate Award from U.S. Army Public Affairs.
- Born: 1946 (age 79–80)
- Occupation: Senior correspondent for Time magazine
- Notable credit: Pulitzer Prize finalist (1996) for his coverage of the Republican takeover of the House of Representatives in 1995

Michael Weisskopf (born 1946) is a Polk Award-winning journalist, currently working as a senior correspondent for Time magazine. A Pulitzer Prize finalist in 1996 for the accounts he and David Maraniss gave of the activities in 1995 following the Republican takeover of the House of Representatives in 1994, Weisskopf specialized in national and international news during 20 years at The Washington Post.

While he was embedded with a US Army unit in Iraq on December 10, 2003, his right hand was blown off as he tried to throw an enemy grenade back out of the Humvee in which he was riding. He was the first reporter to be treated at the Walter Reed Army Medical Center. Weisskopf later wrote about this event in his book Blood Brothers: Among the Soldiers of Ward 57.

Fluent in Mandarin Chinese, Weisskopf covered China for the Post from 1980 to 1985.

He has written a book, Blood Brothers, about amputated American Iraq War veterans and co-written two: Truth at Any Cost, with investigative journalist Susan Schmidt about the Kenneth Starr investigation of the Lewinsky scandal, and Tell Newt to Shut Up, with David Maraniss about the 1994 Republican takeover.

Weisskopf has received the George Polk Award, Goldsmith Prize for Investigative Reporting, the Press Club of Atlantic City's National Headliners Award, the Los Angeles Press Club's Daniel Pearl Award for Courage and Integrity in Journalism, the U.S. Army's Fourth Estate Award and the Embassy of Italy's 2007 Urbino Press Award.

In 2014, it was reported that Weisskopf was working as a broker on several real estate projects.
