= George William Bliss =

American journalist

George Bliss
- Born: July 21, 1918; Denver, Colorado, United States
- Died: September 11, 1978 (aged 60); Oak Lawn, Illinois, United States
- Occupation: Journalist

George Bliss (July 21, 1918 – September 11, 1978) was an American journalist. He won a 1962 Pulitzer Prize for investigative journalism for the Chicago Tribune and was associated with two others:

- 1962: corruption at the Metropolitan Sanitary District of Greater Chicago.
- 1973: For uncovering flagrant violations of voting procedures in the primary election of March 21, 1972
- 1976: waste and fraud at mortgage firms related to Federal Housing Administration mortgage insurance

== Early life ==
Bliss was born on July 21, 1918, in Denver, Colorado, to William Bliss and Marie Bresnanhis. His father was a reporter for The Denver Post. Bliss attended Lyons Township High School and Northwestern University in Chicago, although he dropped out of Northwestern before earning a degree. After a stint at the Chicago Evening American, he joined the staff of the Chicago Tribune in 1942. He briefly left to serve in the United States Navy during World War II.

== Career ==
During his tenure at the Tribune, Bliss concentrated his efforts on unearthing corruption and government waste. In 1950, he broke the story of rampant sexual and physical abuse at the Cook County juvenile home. His 1961 series on massive corruption at the Metropolitan Sanitary District of Greater Chicago won him the 1962 Pulitzer Prize for Local Reporting. Bliss had discovered that the department had been paying salaries to people not even employed.

In 1968, the Tribune refused to let Bliss publish a story on Illinois Secretary of State Paul Powell taking bribes. Bliss left the newspaper and went to work for a local non-profit, the Better Government Association. In 1971, he uncovered corruption in the city's ambulance companies which helped reporter William Jones win a 1971 Pulitzer Prize. After the shootings of Fred Hampton and Mark Clark in 1969, the Tribune developed a reputation for being a pro-establishment newspaper. They rehired Bliss in October 1971 to counter this image. He immediately began researching police brutality complaints against the Chicago Police Department, which resulted in charges filed against several Chicago police officers. He then led an investigation into the 1972 election, which uncovered evidence of missing and forged ballots. The Tribune was awarded a 1973 Pulitzer Prize for their coverage of this voter fraud. In 1974, he published his first story on fraudster Linda Taylor, part of his focus on mismanagement within the Illinois Department of Public Aid. One of his most extensive series was co-authored with five Tribune reporters, including Chuck Neubauer. The team's investigation uncovered a conspiracy between mortgage companies and the United States Department of Housing and Urban Development to defraud American taxpayers. The investigative team won the 1976 Pulitzer Prize for Local Investigative Specialized Reporting.

Bliss was famous for cultivating an image as an "old-time" reporter, wearing a fedora and oversized suits and writing all his stories on an old Royal typewriter. He would sometimes even impersonate police officers or coroners to chase down leads. An estimated 100 criminal convictions resulted from his news pieces.

== Death and legacy ==
In 1977, Bliss took a leave of absence from the Tribune after he was diagnosed with bipolar disorder. He became increasingly depressed and attempted suicide by throwing himself down a flight on stairs. On September 11, 1978, Bliss shot his wife in the back of the head and then himself. In 1980, Bliss was named to the Chicago Journalism Hall of Fame.

== Personal life ==
Bliss married Helen Groble in 1940; the couple had six children. After her death in 1959, Bliss married Therese O'Keefe with whom he had one son.

== Awards ==
- 1954 Edward Scott Beck Award from the Tribune
- 1957 Spot News Reporting Award from Chicago Newspaper Guild
- 1958 Edward Scott Beck Award from the Tribune
- 1958 Spot News Reporting Award from Illinois Associated Press
- 1962 Pulitzer Prize for Local Reporting, No Edition Time
- 1972 News Writing Award from Illinois Associated Press
- 1973 Jacob Scher Award
- 1974 News Writing Award from Illinois Associated Press
- 1974 Inland Daily Press Association Award
- 1974 United Press International News Award
