= Karen Dillon (journalist) =

American investigative journalist

Karen Dillon (born 1952) is an American investigative journalist. She is a native of Missouri and received a bachelor's degree and master's degree from the University of Missouri in 1988 and 1989. She has worked for a number of newspapers including the Sarasota Herald-Tribune, The Kansas City Star, a television station, KSHB, the NBC affiliate in Kansas City, and the Lawrence Journal World. Since 2016, Dillon is self-employed as a freelance investigative journalist and owner of "More Than A-Matter LLC." She has written for "Reuters," "The Washington Post," Kansas City's alternative magazine The Pitch and The Kansas Leadership Center's magazine "The Journal."

== Notable investigations ==
In 1991, Dillon brought down the career of Pee Wee Herman. Working the three-to-midnight shift at the Sarasota Herald-Tribune, Dillon recognized Paul Reubens's name on the police blotter and broke the story of the actor's arrest for indecent exposure inside a pornographic movie theater.

Dillon's most recent investigation, "Running Out of Water, Running Out of Time," was published in "The Journal", The Kansas Leadership Center's magazine. The in-depth ongoing story was about the depletion of the Ogallala aquifer located under the western half of Kansas, how government failed to stop water overuse, and how people and communities in Kansas are dealing with it. The story won the magazine public service award from Sigma Delta Chi, Society of Professional Journalism in 2019 as well as the Burton K. Marvin News Enterprise Award sponsored by the William Allen White Foundation at the University of Kansas.

In November 2016, Dillon's investigation "Prison Broke" revealed millions of dollars were quietly paid to Missouri prison guards who were subjected to severe harassment and racism and by co-workers and supervisors who also retaliated against them. The governor fired or allowed to resign numerous employees including the prisons director and his second-in-command. The stories published in Kansas City's alternative magazine, "The Pitch," won first place investigative reporting in 2017 from the Association of Alternative NewsMedia.

In July 2014, The Pitch published an investigative story about an off-duty Kansas City police officer working security who shot and killed a man celebrating his wedding made several mistakes that violated department policy. If those policies had been followed, it is likely the shooting would never have occurred, the investigation found.

Also in 2014, Dillon worked on an investigative documentary, "The Dark State", that aired on KSHB. The documentary helped open police arrest and search warrant reports in 2014 for the first time in Kansas in 30 years. Kansas was the only state in the country with laws that closed those records. Dillon first reported the story for The Kansas City Star in 2013, and in 2014, she was the investigative producer for "The Dark State" documentary that aired on KSHB. The Dark State was nominated for an Emmy award in July. Dillon also was recognized by the Kansas Sunshine Coalition for her work to keep government records open.

She won a 2001 Goldsmith Prize for Investigative Reporting. The series "To Protect and Collect" examined a controversial police practice of keeping money seized during drug raids. The stories revealed how police were using the federal government to hand off money they seized in drug cases. The government kept about 20 percent and returned the rest to police. Many states including Missouri prohibit police from keeping fines and forfeitures and instead send the money to education.

Dillon and two other reporters won a 1998 George Polk Award for the five-part series "Money Games: Inside the NCAA". Dillon helped write about the finances within the NCAA and lack of gender equity.

She was named the 2010 "Journalist of the Year", by the Kansas City Press Club, for her investigation into pollution in the Lake of the Ozarks. Government officials knew levels of e. coli were high but failed to warn lake visitors because of concerns over revenue loss.

== Life ==
Dillon graduated from the Missouri School of Journalism with an MA in journalism and political science. She was an investigative reporter for the Lawrence Journal World, a daily newspaper in the Kansas City area until 2016, and is now a freelance reporter. She resides in Kansas.
