= Lizette Alvarez =

American journalist

- Born: October 30, 1964 (age 61); Miami, Florida
- Education: Florida State University (BA); Northwestern University (MS)
- Occupation: Journalist
- Notable credit(s): Pulitzer Prize, Goldsmith Prize, George Polk Award
- Spouse: Don Van Natta Jr.

Lizette Alvarez (born October 30, 1964) is an American journalist and has worked for more than two decades with The New York Times. She has served as the Miami bureau chief since January 2011. Alvarez has been a reporter for the New York Daily News and The Miami Herald.

== Early life and education ==
Alvarez was born in Miami, Florida, October 30, 1964, the daughter of Cuban refugees. She graduated from Florida State University with a B.A. in 1986 and from Northwestern University with an M.S. degree in journalism in 1987.

Alvarez describes herself as "the daughter of Cuban refugees...raised to resist oppression and champion liberty."

== Career ==
She began her career in journalism in 1991, working for the Miami Herald as an immigration reporter and Cuba correspondent. One of her early stories, "Cuban Naval Defectors Tell of Life in Military," was published in February, 1992.

In August 1992, Alvarez was one of nine people to survive the destructive effects of Hurricane Andrew, as they rode-out the storm in a small motel, fleeing to another room as the roof was ripped off where they tried to shelter themselves. Her husband (who was her boyfriend at the time) was also a reporter for The Miami Herald; they were both part of the staff awarded the 1993 Pulitzer Prize for Public Service, for coverage of Hurricane Andrew and its aftermath. Later, she published her personal story of the experience.

In 1995, Alvarez and fellow journalist, Lisa Getter, won the Goldsmith Prize for investigate reporting on Lost in America: Our Failed Immigration Policy.

Years later, Alvarez was one of hundreds of journalists who joined in support of the formation of the newspaper union, One Herald Guild. She and her husband signed a petition and offered their testimonials, supporting the effort; Alvarez wrote:

"Being fair is one of the principles sought by professional journalists in the exercise of their profession. So why not receive that same fairness from their employers? Unfortunately, corporate America -- including the newspaper owners -- doesn't believe in that. It's time for the journalists at The Miami Herald to ask – demand, at times – to be counted in determining the future of the newspaper. It's only fair."

In July 1995, Alvarez left Miami to work for the New York Times. She has worked for over two decades with the organization, beginning as an assignment reporter at the Metro-desk, in New York, and as of 2020, the Miami bureau chief, since 2011. She has served as a Washington correspondent, covering congress and reported on Northern Europe, while serving as the London bureau chief. In 2017, she elected to accept a buyout offer, as the Times shifted their newsroom operations.

== Personal life ==
Alvarez is married to journalist Don Van Natta, Jr.; they have two daughters, Isabel and Sofia.

== Awards ==
- 1993 Pulitzer Prize for Public Service, (with the staff of The Miami Herald), citing its coverage of Hurricane Andrew's destruction, including the contribution of "lax zoning, inspection, and building codes"
- 1995 The Goldsmith Prize for Investigative Reporting (with Lisa Getter) for "Lost in America: Our Failed Immigration Policy," The Miami Herald* 1996 The George Polk Award for Metro Reporting, (with Frank Bruni, Nina Bernstein, and Joyce Purnick) for their 1995 reporting on the New York City Child Welfare Administration, The New York Times
- 2008 Peabody Award, (with the staff) for nytimes.com, awarded in recognition that "its website exemplifies a new age for the press, expanding its role in ways unimaginable only a few years."
