= Adam Goldman =

American journalist

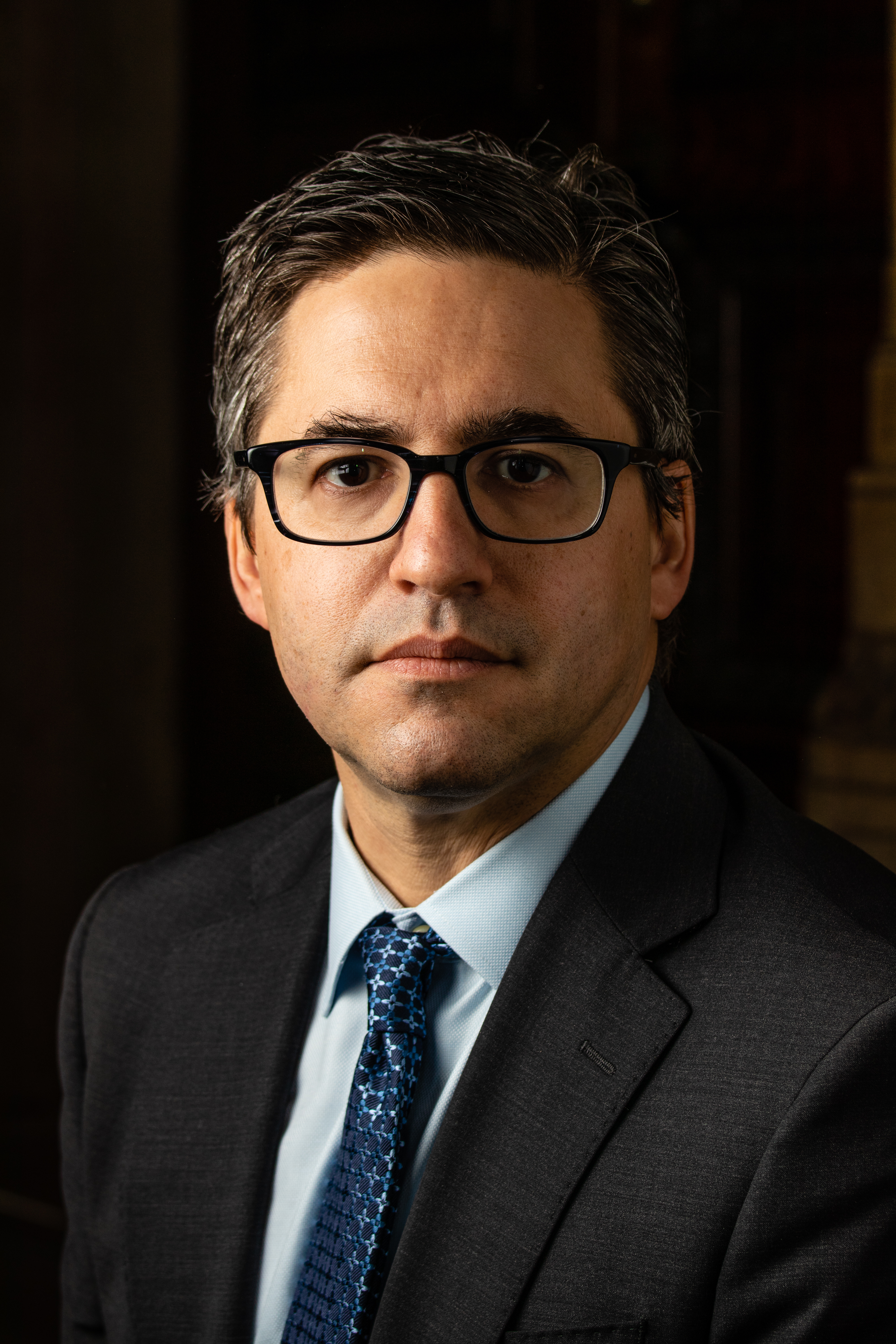
- Goldman at the 2018 Pulitzer Prizes
- Born: 14 August 1973 (age 53)
- Education: University of Maryland (BA)
- Occupation: Journalist

Adam Goldman (born 14 August 1973) is a three-time Pulitzer Prize-winning American journalist. He received the award for covering the New York Police Department's spying program that monitored daily life in Muslim communities, for coverage of Russian meddling in the 2016 presidential election, and for covering the intelligence failures that preceded the October 7, 2023 attacks in Israel.

== Early life and education ==
Goldman, who is of Jewish heritage, graduated from the University of Maryland in 1995, moving to Israel soon after. He returned to the U.S. in 1998.

== Career ==
Goldman skipped journalism school and instead started to work at newspapers in Virginia and Alabama where he covered police officers and city hall. He joined the Associated Press (AP) Las Vegas bureau in 2002. At AP Goldman covered gambling and tourism in Las Vegas. He moved to New York as an assignment reporter in 2005 and covered many breaking stories such as the Miracle on the Hudson and an attempted 2009 plot to bomb the subway system.

Goldman and Matt Apuzzo have reported on a secret CIA prison in Romania. Goldman is also the co-author of Enemies Within: Inside the NYPD’s Secret Spying Unit and bin Laden’s Final Plot Against America. Goldman and Apuzzo collaborated in writing this book.

Goldman was a reporter with the national security team at The Washington Post from 2013 to 2016. He joined The New York Times in August 2016 where he covers the FBI and counterterrorism.

== Achievements and honors ==
In 2012, Goldman shared numerous awards with Matt Apuzzo, Eileen Sullivan, and Chris Hawley of the Associated Press for their investigative series on the New York Police Department's surveillance of Muslim communities following the September 11 attacks. The awards include the Pulitzer Prize, Goldsmith Prize, George Polk Award, and the Edgar A. Poe Award from the White House Correspondents' Association.

In 2014, Goldman, Matt Apuzzo, and Ted Bridis were presented the Anthony Shadid Award by The Center for Journalism Ethics at the University of Wisconsin.

In 2018, Goldman was part of a team that won the Pulitzer Prize for National Reporting on Russia’s meddling in the presidential election.
