= Gary Little (judge) =

American judge (1939–1988)

Judge of the King County Superior Court
- In office 1980–1988

Personal details
- Born: March 6, 1939 Seattle, Washington, U.S.
- Died: August 18, 1988 (aged 49) Seattle, Washington, U.S.
- Cause of death: Suicide
- Education: Harvard University (BA); University of Washington (JD)
- Occupation: Judge, attorney

Gary Morton Little (March 6, 1939 – August 18, 1988) was an American judge from Seattle, Washington who committed suicide in 1988 after allegations that he had sexual contact with underage boys. The public allegations against Little, and his subsequent suicide, followed a decade of rumors that had circulated about him, including several media exposes that had been quashed before publication, and a state investigation of Little which had been sealed.

== Early life and education ==
Little was born in Seattle, the son of truck driver Sterling Little, who died in August 1947 after hanging himself in a jail cell in the King County Courthouse where he was being held on a burglary charge. Gary Little's widowed mother worked as a stenographer while he and his sister were raised by their grandmother. Little, described as a "driven and able" student, graduated from Lincoln High School and earned a scholarship to Harvard University.

Little graduated from Harvard and went on to earn a juris doctor from the University of Washington School of Law. While a student at the University of Washington, he "immersed himself in Democratic politics" and began to develop a circle of influential friends.

== Career ==
Beginning in the 1960s, Little worked as an Assistant Attorney General assigned to the University of Washington. During this time, he also served as a volunteer counselor in the Seattle juvenile court and as a part-time teacher at the prestigious Lakeside School from 1968 to 1972. He subsequently was retained as general counsel for the Seattle School District, and was later credited with engineering the district's "sweeping desegregation program".

Little was elected to the King County Superior Court in 1980.

=== Allegations of sexual abuse ===
In 1981, King County Prosecutor Norm Maleng quietly opened an investigation into rumors that had been circulating about Little having inappropriate contact with juvenile defendants outside the courtroom. A subsequent inquiry by the state's Commission on Judicial Conduct found that Little had non-criminal, but inappropriate, encounters with boys who appeared in his court and admonished him for it, however, the report of the inquiry was sealed.

At about the same time, three of Little's former students at the Lakeside School contacted the Seattle Post-Intelligencer to allege instances of sexual abuse by the judge when he was working at the school in the 1960s. The newspaper began an investigation of the claims, in the process of which it discovered a previously unknown arrest of Little from 1964 on charges of assault against a 16-year-old in Little's Seattle apartment; the charges in that case had been dismissed. The Seattle Post-Intelligencer's inquiry stalled after the former Lakeside students refused to swear affidavits as to the veracity of their accusations. Publishers had demanded the affidavits to protect the newspaper against the possibility of a future libel lawsuit.

By the mid 1980s, Little had become a divisive figure among judges on the Superior Court; some felt he actively sought to try juvenile cases as a way of coming into contact with boys for sexual purposes, while other judges felt such insinuations amounted to gay bashing. In 1985 Superior Court presiding judge Norman Quinn directed that Little not hear criminal cases involving juveniles after he discovered Little had taken a 14-year-old defendant from Bellevue, Washington, Christmas shopping for the boy's father. Little defended his involvement with the boy, stating that it was important for those in the criminal justice system to "intervene in a dramatic and decisive way in the lives" of young people to deter them from a future life of crime.

The same year, when Little was restricted from trying juvenile cases, KING-TV prepared to air a story on Little based on the accounts of four confidential sources who alleged they had been abused by him at the Lakeside School in the 1960s. Ancil Payne, the president of King Broadcasting Company, ordered that the story be shelved. A simultaneous inquiry by The Seattle Times was never published, though reporter Don McGaffin later recalled that he had personally witnessed Little kissing "a blond, blue-eyed male student" on one occasion in 1968 when he had walked into Little's office at the University of Washington.

In July 1988, KING-TV aired a story about Little's earlier involvement with the Bellevue 14-year-old, after which Little announced he would not seek renewal of his term on the Superior Court, which was expiring that year, and instead depart Washington for California. Following the KING-TV story, the Seattle Post-Intelligencer reopened its earlier investigation of the Lakeside allegations and decided to move forward with publication, the new article being penned by reporter Duff Wilson.

== Death ==
On August 18, 1988, Little shot and killed himself in his chambers in the King County Courthouse, the same building his father had killed himself in more than 40 years before. Little had earlier been contacted by Duff Wilson who informed him about his soon to-be published story. A suicide note found at the scene read, in part:

I have chosen to take my life. It's an appropriate end to the present situation. I had hoped that my decision to withdraw from the election and leave public life would have closed the matter. Apparently these steps are not satisfactory to those who feel more is required.

More than 600 people attended Little's funeral.

=== Aftermath ===
Initial public reaction to news of Little's death largely focused on the Seattle Post-Intelligencer and the belief it had hounded the judge, though the confidential operation of the state's Commission on Judicial Conduct and the suppression of its 1981 report also quickly came under scrutiny. Later, concern was expressed that indicators of possible wrongdoing by Little had been covered up by Seattle's historically cloistered social and political elite. In a story published two months after Little's death, The Washington Post noted that "the explanations have centered on the traditional decorum and protectiveness of Seattle politics, libel laws, the gay-rights movement, the reluctance to besmirch a judge and, particularly, Little's solid public reputation and widespread friendships".

== Personal life ==
Little was viewed by colleagues and community members as "funny, articulate, [and] brilliant" and seamlessly embedded himself as a fixture within Seattle society despite his modest origins. He was known to be a "dapper" dresser who frequented the city's finest clubs and restaurants. Some jurors who served in his court recalled that he had a penchant for making the law accessible and adeptly handling the mechanics of complex cases.
