= Marshall Allen (journalist) =

American journalist (1972–2024)

- Born: March 20, 1972; Portland, Oregon, U.S.
- Died: May 19, 2024 (aged 52); Colleyville, Texas, U.S.
- Education: University of Colorado Boulder, Fuller Theological Seminary (MA)
- Occupation: Journalist
- Known for: 2011 Goldsmith Prize for Investigative Reporting
- Spouse: Sonja Allen
- Children: 3

Marshall Allen (March 20, 1972 – May 19, 2024) was an American journalist who, with Alex Richards, won the 2011 Goldsmith Prize for Investigative Reporting for reporting on patient safety in Las Vegas hospitals as a reporter at the Las Vegas Sun. The series of articles was also a finalist for the Pulitzer Prize for Local Reporting in 2011.

== Life and career ==
Allen was born March 20, 1972, in Portland, Oregon, the second son of Darrell and Polly Allen. He graduated from Fuller Theological Seminary with a Master's degree in Theology. For three years, he and his wife Sonja served as missionaries associated with Young Life in Nairobi, Kenya.

Allen was a staff writer at the Pasadena Star-News, and the News-Press and Foothill Leader Newspapers. He was a reporter for the Las Vegas Sun, from 2006 to 2011. He was a 2009 Fellow of the Association of Health Care Journalists (AHCJ). The "Do No Harm" project was based on data mining, and analyzing hospital records turned over to the State of Nevada.

Allen reported on health care for ProPublica and taught investigative health reporting at the City University of New York Graduate School of Journalism. In 2018, Allen was named a "Top Doctor" in the State of New York. Despite carrying no medical credentials, he was able to pay $99 to receive the award.

After the success of his book Never Pay the First Bill, Marshall Allen founded the Allen Health Academy, a platform dedicated to empowering individuals and employers with strategies to lower healthcare costs and navigate the complexities of the healthcare system. Students have saved a reported $1.65M in medical bills as a result of Allen's curriculum.

Allen died of a heart attack on May 19, 2024, at the age of 52. ProPublica, his former employer, published his obituary.

After Allen's death, friends and colleagues launched the Marshall Allen Project to equip working Americans and employers with knowledge, strategies, and tools to lower health care costs.

Allen insisted that uncovering truth was fundamental to his Christian faith.

== Works ==
- "Do No Harm", Las Vegas Sun
- Never Pay the First Bill: And Other Ways to Fight the Health Care System and Win. Portfolio. 2021. ISBN 978-0593190005.
