= Eileen Sullivan =

American journalist

- Born: 1977 (age 48–49); Alexandria, Virginia, United States
- Citizenship: United States
- Education: B.A. in English
- Alma mater: Villanova University
- Occupation: Journalist
- Children: 1 daughter
- Writing career
- Notable awards: Pulitzer Prize for Investigative Reporting; 2012

Eileen Sullivan (born 1977) is an American journalist who has covered counter-terrorism and national security for The Associated Press and The New York Times. She won a Pulitzer Prize for Investigative Reporting in 2012.

== Early life ==
Sullivan was born in Alexandria, Virginia. Growing up, she was inspired to pursue journalism by her parents' longtime friend, award-winning journalist and author Robin Wright. She was fascinated by Wright's stories about her job and travels.

Sullivan attended St. Stephen's and St. Agnes School in Alexandria, where she participated in the French Club and Students Against Driving Drunk. Her school sports activities included lacrosse, track, and basketball, and she was the co-captain of the varsity field hockey team. She was elected to the Honor Council her junior and senior years, and graduated in 1995.

Sullivan studied English at Villanova University. While there, she wrote for The Villanovan, the school newspaper, and interned at a magazine in Philadelphia. She graduated in 1999 with honors.

== Career ==
Sullivan started her career 1997 working for the Courier-Post in Cherry Hill, New Jersey. Her first big assignment was covering an "ugliest couch contest" and interviewing the winner. In 2001, Sullivan, Angela Rucker, and Jason Laughlin earned an award from the New Jersey Press Association for their article on teenage alcohol use, "Many equate booze with fun".

Sullivan moved to the Federal Times in 2003, and then to Congressional Quarterly in 2005 where she covered the creation of the Department of Homeland Security and Hurricane Katrina.

Sullivan joined the Associated Press in 2007 to work in their Washington bureau. She became an expert on homegrown terrorism and domestic radicalization while covering counter-terrorism.

Sullivan, together with Matt Apuzzo, Adam Goldman, and Chris Hawley, wrote a series of investigative reports on the New York Police Department's (NYPD) work under the guidance of the CIA to spy on the daily life of Muslims in the New York metropolitan area for years after the 11 September 2001 attacks. The series earned them the 2012 Pulitzer Prize for Investigative Reporting, the 2012 Goldsmith Prize for Investigative Reporting from the Shorenstein Center at the Kennedy School of Government, the 2012 Paul Tobenkin Memorial Award from the Columbia University Graduate School of Journalism, the 2011 George Polk Award for Metropolitan Reporting, and the Edgar A. Poe Award from the White House Correspondents' Association. The fallout from the series led to an unsuccessful lawsuit against the NYPD brought by the State of New Jersey, and the disbanding of the surveillance program in 2014.

Sullivan joined The New York Times in 2017 as an early-morning breaking news reporter in their Washington, D.C., bureau.

== Personal life ==
Sullivan and her husband James live with their daughter Celia in the Capitol Hill neighborhood in Washington D.C.
