= Duff Wilson =

American journalist

Duff Wilson is an American investigative reporter, formerly with The New York Times, later with Reuters. He is the first two-time winner of the Harvard University Goldsmith Prize for Investigative Reporting, a two-time winner of the George Polk Award, and a three-time finalist for the Pulitzer Prize.

== Education ==
Wilson graduated from Western Washington University in 1976, and from the Columbia University Graduate School of Journalism in 1982.

== Career ==
He has worked for The Seattle Times, The New York Times and Reuters and has served on the board of Investigative Reporters and Editors. Since 2010 he has taught investigative reporting at the Columbia University Graduate School of Journalism. Wilson joined The New York Times in 2004. During his time there, Wilson covered topics such as pharmaceutical and tobacco industries along with sports-related investigations, mainly steroids. One article he wrote about the Duke Lacrosse Case garnered criticism, as the case unraveled. Prior to working for The Times, he worked as an investigative projects reporter for The Seattle Times since 1989. Before working here, he worked for the Seattle Post-Intelligencer and the Associated Press. At the Seattle PI, Wilson wrote that paper's story about Gary Little. Wilson is also a webmaster of Reporter's Desktop.

== Family ==
Wilson's father and brother published a weekly newspaper in Washington. He has two children with Barbara Wilson, a high school teacher.

== Works ==
- Fateful Harvest: The True Story of a Small Town, a Global Industry, and a Toxic Secret. HarperCollins. 2001. ISBN 978-0-06-019369-0.

== Awards and honors ==
- 1998; 2002 Goldsmith Prize for Investigative Reporting
- 2001; 2003 George Polk Award for medical and local reporting
- 2002 Gerald Loeb Award for Large Newspapers
- 2002 Heywood Broun Award
- May 2012 Sidney Award
- 2003; 2002; 1998 three time Pulitzer finalist
- Public-service awards from the Associated Press Managing Editors and the Newspaper Guild
- 2002; Book-of-the-year honors from IRE for his book Fateful Harvest: The True Story of a Small Town, a Global Industry, and a Toxic Secret
- USACBL champion
