= Deborah Nelson =

American journalist

Deborah Nelson is a Pulitzer prize-winning freelance journalist at Reuters and the Associate Professor of Investigative Reporting at the Philip Merrill College of Journalism at the University of Maryland.

Nelson earned her B.S. in Journalism from Northern Illinois University and her J.D. from the DePaul University College of Law in 1987. Prior to joining the faculty at the University of Maryland in 2006, she was the Washington investigations editor for the Los Angeles Times, the national investigative team reporter for The Washington Post, and a reporter for the Chicago Sun-Times.

In 1997, Nelson won the Pulitzer Prize for Investigative Reporting for her investigative work for the Seattle Times, exposing “widespread corruption and inequities in the federally-sponsored housing program for Native Americans, which inspired much-needed reforms.”

In 2008, she received critical acclaim for her book, The War Behind Me: Vietnam Veterans Confront the Truth about U.S. War Crimes, which investigates declassified Army papers on Vietnam-era war crimes and uncovers the lives of soldiers who were witness to the crimes.

Nelson currently teaches courses on investigative reporting and media law and is on the advisory boards of the Fund for Investigative Journalism and the Investigative Reporting Workshop.

== Investigative journalism ==
As an investigative journalist, Nelson has covered a wide range of topics, centered on exposing problems in the environment, the health industry, income inequality, and human rights violations. Her news publications also have addressed issues of misconduct in the gene therapy field and medical research in developing countries.

=== Pulitzer Prize ===
In 1997, Deborah Nelson shared the Pulitzer Prize with Eric Nalder and Alex Tizon for their The Seattle Times series that identified critical problems in the federal government's Indian Housing Program. The series, titled Tribal housing: From Deregulation to Disgrace, exposes that "Across the nation - in tribe after tribe, state after state - the Indian-housing program is riddled with fraud, abuse and mismanagement." The series concludes with a five-point list of recommendations for a more effective tribal-housing program, which include the strict enforcement of rules, a mandate that requires that the bulk of federal funding to be channeled to low-income households that need assistance the most, and the creation of constraints that will prevent disproportionately large expenditures on small families.

Nelson's series was crucial in initiating reform in the management of the tribal housing program.

Additionally, Nelson also co-edited Pulitzer Prize-winning series for The Washington Post, which covered the death of 229 children in the District of Columbia, and for the Los Angeles Times on the death of 45 Marine pilots in Harrier jet accidents.

=== Selected awards in journalism ===
- Pulitzer Prize for Investigative Reporting, 1997, “Tribal Housing: From Deregulation to Disgrace,” Seattle Times
- Sidney Hillman Prize for Excellence in Journalism, 2019, "Ambushed at Home," Reuters
- White House Correspondents' Association Edgar A. Poe Award, 2019,"Ambushed at Home," Reuters
- Society of Professional Journalists Sigma Delta Chi Award, 2019, "Ambushed at Home," Reuters
- National Press Club Award for Consumer Journalism, 2019, "Ambushed at Home," Reuters
- American Association for the Advancement of Science Kavli Science Journalism Gold Award, 2017, “The Uncounted," Reuters
- Society of Professional Journalists Deadline Club Award for Enterprise Reporting, 2017, “The Uncounted," Reuters
- National Academies of Sciences Communication Award, 2015, "Water's Edge," Reuters
- Society of Professional Journalists Sigma Delta Chi Award, 2014, "Water's Edge" Reuters
- National Press Club Award for Consumer Journalism, 2015, "Water's Edge," Reuters
- Society of Professional Journalists Sigma Delta Chi Award, 2001, “Body Hunters,” Washington Post
- Overseas Press Club of America Award for business reporting, 2001, “Body Hunters,” Washington Post
- American Association for the Advancement of Science Award, 2000, “Gene Therapy,” Washington Post
- John B. Oakes Award for Distinguished Environmental Journalism, 1999, “Trading Away the West,” Seattle Times
- Women in Communications Clarion Award, 1997, “Tribal Housing: From Deregulation to Disgrace,” Seattle Times
- National Housing Journalism Award, 1991, “The Slum Brokers,” Chicago Sun-Times

== Recent Publications ==
- "Ambushed at Home: The hazardous, squalid housing of American military families," Reuters (Nov. 1, Dec. 28, 2018) with Michael B. Pell.
- "The Uncounted: The Epidemic America is Ignoring," Reuters (Sep. 7, Nov. 18, Dec. 15, Dec. 22, 2016) with Ryan McNeill and Yasmeen Abutaleb.
- “Water's Edge: The Crisis of Rising Sea Levels," Reuters (Jul. 10, Sep. 4, Sep. 17, Nov. 24, 2014) with Ryan McNeill and Duff Wilson.
- “The Unequal State of America: Redistributing Up,” Reuters (Dec. 18, 2012) with Himanshu Ojha.
- “The Cruelest Show on Earth,” Mother Jones (Nov. – Dec. 2011).
- The War Behind Me: Vietnam Veterans Confront the Truth About U.S. War Crimes (Basic Books; 2008).
- “Vietnam: The War Crimes Files,” The Los Angeles Times (Aug. 6 and 20, 2006) with Nick Turse.
- “Body Hunters,” The Washington Post (Dec. 17 – 22, 2000) with a team of reporters.
- “Gene Therapy,” The Washington Post (Sept. 1999 – Nov. 2000) with Rick Weiss.
- “Trading Away the West,” The Seattle Times (Sept. 27 – Oct 2, 1998) with Jim Simon, Danny Westneat and Eric Nalder.
- “Tribal Housing: From Deregulation to Disgrace,” The Seattle Times (Dec. 1 – 5, 1996) with Eric Nalder and Alex Tizon.
- “The Wenatchee Sex Crime Case: Evidence on Trial,” The Seattle Times (Nov. 26 – 27, 1995) with Marla Williams, Duff Wilson and Thomas Haines.
- "The Slum Brokers," Chicago Sun-Times (Jun 30 – Jul 2, 1991) with Tom Brune.
