= Better Government Association =

Chicago-based investigative journalism non-profit organization

- Founded: 1923
- Founder: E.J. Davis
- Type: Non-profit Organization
- Location: Chicago
- Website: http://www.bettergov.org

The Better Government Association (BGA) is a Chicago-based investigative journalism non-profit organization.

== History ==
The BGA was established in 1923 to increase voter participation in Chicago elections, and was originally intended to serve as a non-partisan guide to better government. This was also part of an effort to thwart Al Capone's influence from local politics during the Prohibition era. However, the organization started to focus more on watchdog journalism during the 10-year tenure of George E. Mahin as executive director. Under Mahin's leadership, the BGA began investigating the administration of Chicago Mayor Richard J. Daley.

The BGA has also developed a strong relationship with the media, often working together with journalists on investigations. This was especially apparent during the tenure of George William Bliss as the BGA's chief investigator from 1968 to 1971. Bliss had previously worked for the Chicago Tribune, and would later return to the Tribune as an investigator in 1971. Even when the BGA conducts its investigations on its own, a press conference is usually called to discuss the results.

One of the BGA's most famous investigations took place in 1977 when it worked with the Chicago Sun-Times to open and operate a fake bar called Mirage Tavern. The investigators uncovered widespread corruption, including tax skimming and kickbacks, among Chicago officials, and led to a 25-part series on the Sun-Times. The sting led to numerous terminations and reforms in the city. However, the investigation was denied a Pulitzer Prize due to concerns that the Sun-Times had engaged in unethical deception to get the story.

== Organization ==
The BGA has roughly nine investigators (as of 2014) on its Investigations team, which has always partnered with media organizations on reporting and monitoring government bodies. Over a five-year period, the team has produced 290 investigations, about 90 of which have resulted in "tangible reforms".

The BGA's Policy and Civic Engagement teams focus on advocacy that promotes good government. The Investigations and Policy teams operate autonomously, to ensure a separation between the BGA's reporting and advocacy.

In addition to partnerships with traditional media outlets like the Chicago Sun-Times, the BGA has also looked into forming relationships with online and niche publications, including Crain's Chicago Business, Catalyst Chicago, and the Chicago News Cooperative.

The BGA maintains an Illinois Public Salaries Database, which allows the public to research the compensation for employees in all levels of state government. The BGA submitted nearly 1,000 Freedom of Information Act requests to update the database in 2020. The database separates bonus pay and overtime from base salaries, and also allows users to track the work histories for individual employees.

== Awards and notable achievements ==
The BGA and the Center on Wrongful Convictions won the Edward R. Murrow Award for a June 2011 investigation into the high cost of wrongful convictions. The investigation documented the human and financial toll of alleged government and police misconduct that led to 85 people wrongfully incarcerated for violent crimes they did not commit.

The BGA was awarded the Eugene S. Pulliam First Amendment Award, presented by Sigma Delta Chi and the Society of Professional Journalists, in 2017 for their work that led Chicago Mayor Rahm Emanuel to acknowledge he had been conducting government business using private email accounts to circumvent public records laws.

In 2018, BGA reporters won the Thomas L. Stokes Award for Best Energy Writing from the National Press Foundation for a series on lax nuclear oversight.

The BGA shared the 2022 Pulitzer Prize for Local Reporting with the Chicago Tribune for its investigation into Chicago's long history of failed building- and fire-safety code enforcement.

== See also ==
- Robert L. Hunter, past president of the BGA
