= Matt Apuzzo =

American journalist

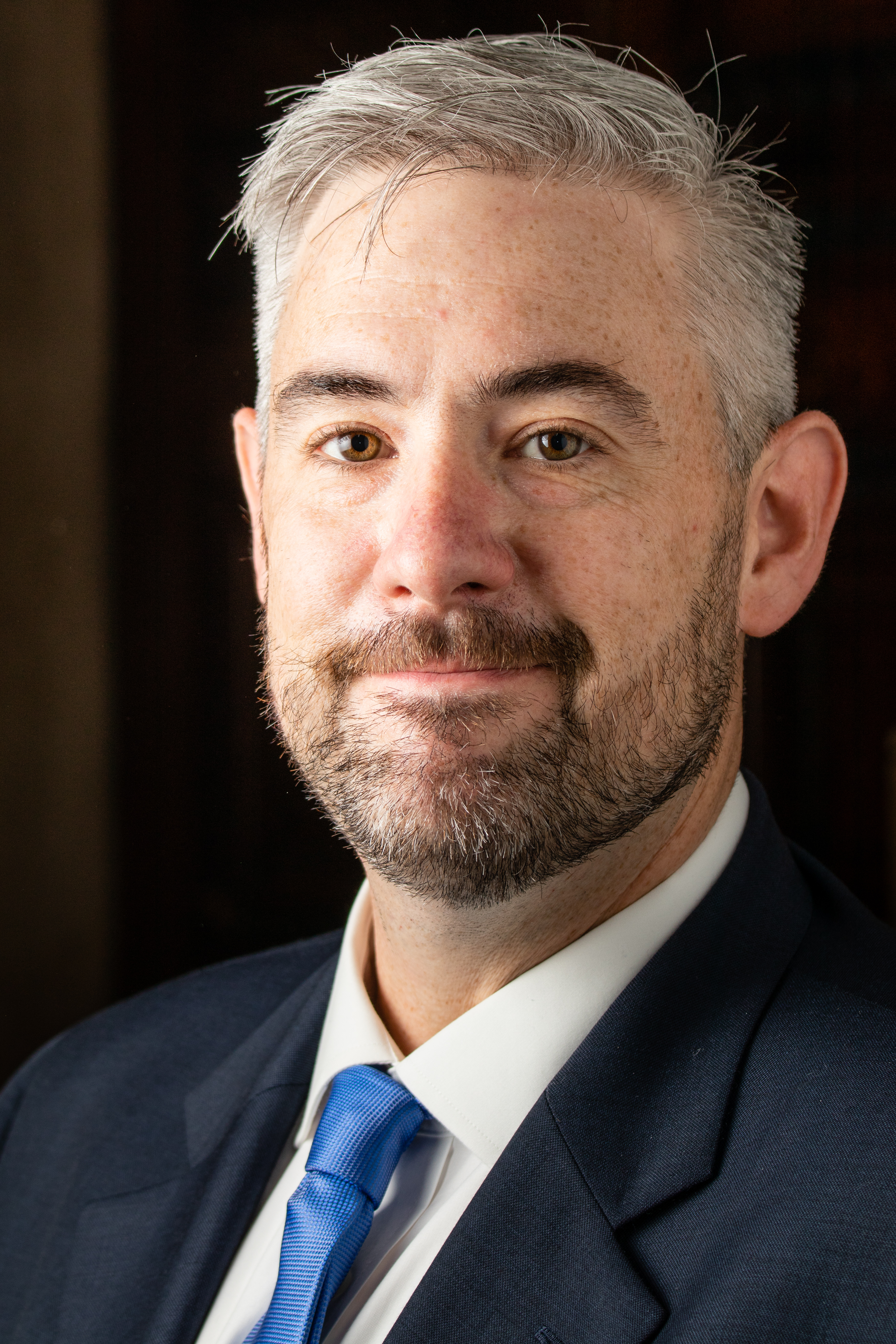
- Apuzzo at the 2018 Pulitzer Prizes
- Born: 20 October 1978 (age 47); Cumberland, Maine, United States
- Education: Colby College
- Occupation: Journalist

Matt Apuzzo (born 20 October 1978) is an American journalist working for The New York Times.

== Early life ==
Apuzzo was born in Cumberland, Maine and attended Colby College, where he edited the school newspaper, the Colby Echo.

== Career ==
He wrote for the Waterville Morning Sentinel while in college. He then worked for The Standard-Times in New Bedford, Massachusetts before moving to the Associated Press. He reported on New York City Police Department corruption and misconduct and revealed its collaboration with the CIA to conduct surveillance in Muslim communities. He won the 2012 Pulitzer Prize for Investigative Reporting with Adam Goldman, Eileen Sullivan and Chris Hawley. In 2013, Apuzzo co-wrote a book with Adam Goldman called Enemies Within.

Since 2013, he has worked for The New York Times and teaches journalism at Georgetown University. At the Times, Apuzzo covered the militarization of police departments and broke several stories about the Justice Department's civil rights investigations in Ferguson, Mo., and elsewhere. In April 2015, Apuzzo and his colleague Michael Schmidt revealed the video footage of a white police officer in North Charleston, South Carolina, shooting an unarmed black man running away from him.

In July 2015, a story by Apuzzo and Michael Schmidt about the Hillary Clinton email controversy drew criticism from H. Clinton's campaign and her supporters, including from the Times public editor Margaret Sullivan. The Washington Post media columnist Erik Wemple in April 2017 cleared Apuzzo and Schmidt of wrongdoing in connection with the story, saying if anything the Times had understated the severity of how seriously the government was investigating Mrs. Clinton.

Apuzzo and two other Times reporters authored a series of stories in 2016 about how American torture policies in the years after the Sept. 11, 2001 attacks, had led to long lasting mental health issues for those detainees tortured by Americans. The stories were one of the first accounts of the mental health toll created by American torture policies.

In June 2018, the Times announced Apuzzo had been appointed Investigative Correspondent in Brussels and would be moving from the Washington bureau to join the International Desk from August 2018. In April 2022, the Times announced that Apuzzo would become its first International Investigations Editor.

=== Subpoena over leak investigations ===
Apuzzo's phone records have been subpoenaed twice, under both the Obama and Trump administrations. In 2013, it was revealed that the Justice Department secretly subpoenaed Apuzzo's phone records as part of a leak investigation into who provided the Associated Press information about a bomb plot foiled by the CIA. It was later revealed that the Justice Department had conducted leak investigations into his stories twice before. He has been highly critical of government secrecy and the media's willingness to accept it.

=== Awards ===
Apuzzo has won or shared in three Pulitzer Prizes: The 2012 award for investigative reporting; the 2018 award for national reporting for coverage of Russian election interference and its connections to the Trump campaign's ties to Russia; and the 2021 prize for public service as part of the Times coverage of the coronavirus pandemic.
