= Brian Ross (journalist) =

American investigative journalist (born 1948)

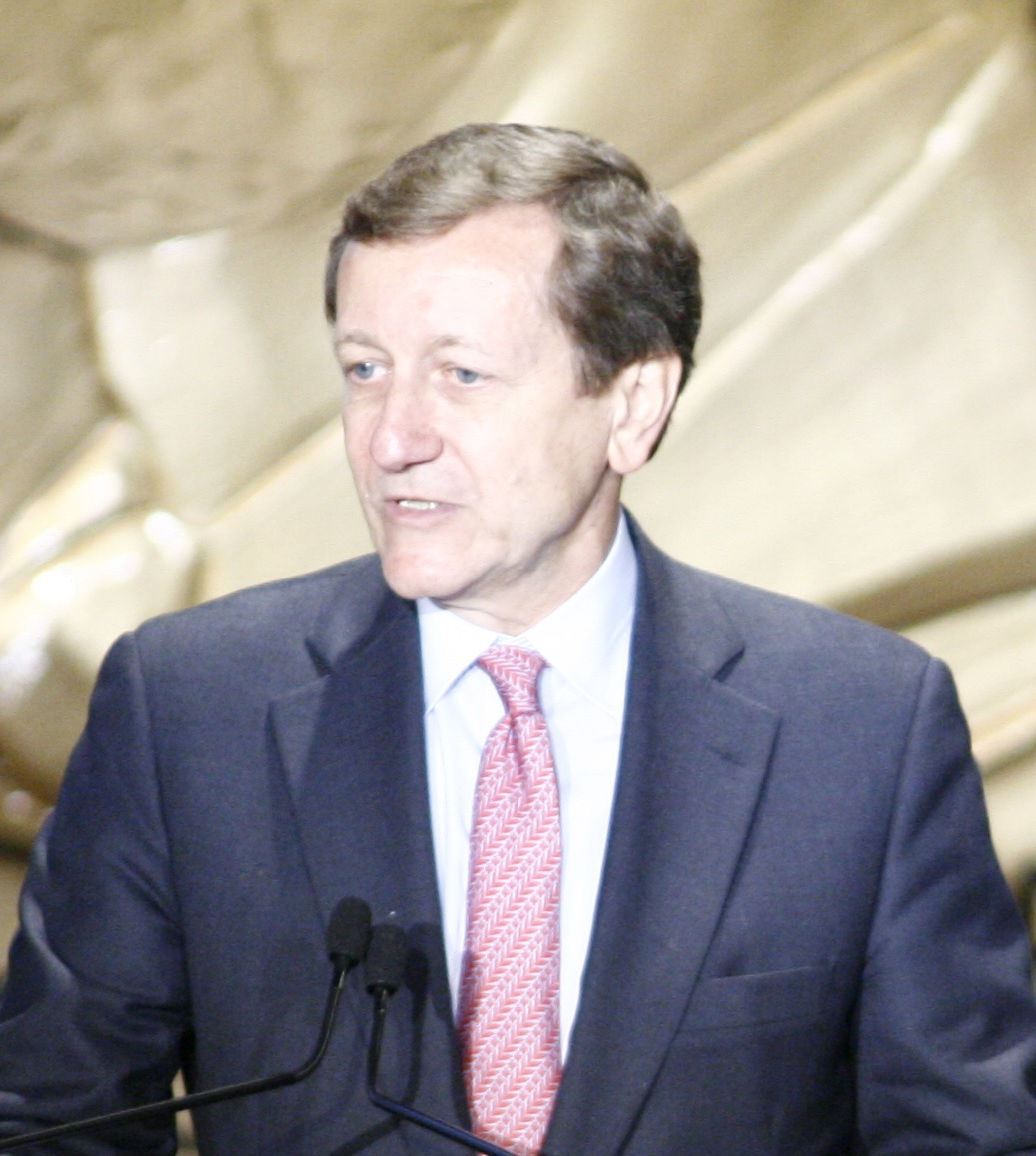
- Ross in 2007
- Born: Brian Elliot Ross; October 23, 1948 (age 78); Chicago, Illinois, U.S.
- Education: University of Iowa (B.A., 1971)
- Occupation: Television journalist
- Spouse: Lucinda Sanman (m. 1985)
- Website: ABC news

Brian Elliot Ross (born October 23, 1948) is an American investigative journalist who served as the Chief Investigative Correspondent for ABC News until 2018. He reported for ABC World News Tonight with David Muir, Nightline, Good Morning America, 20/20 and ABC News Radio. Ross joined ABC News in July 1994 and was fired in 2018. His investigative reports have often covered government corruption. From 1974 until 1994, Ross was a correspondent for NBC News.

== Early life ==
Ross was born and raised in Chicago, Illinois. He graduated from the University of Iowa journalism school in 1971.

=== NBC News ===
In the mid 1970s, while reporting for WKYC-TV in Cleveland, Ross reported on Jackie Presser and corruption in the Teamsters union and interviewed mobster Danny Greene. He continued to report on the Teamsters after being hired by NBC News. His reporting on the Teamsters won him a Sigma Delta Chi Award in 1976 and a National Headliner award in 1977. Ross broke the FBI Abscam story while at NBC.

=== ABC News ===
From 1994 to 2018, Ross was a reporter for ABC News, working on programs such as World News with Diane Sawyer, 20/20, Good Morning America, Nightline, This Week with George Stephanopoulos, and ABC News Radio.

In 2009, Ross and his investigative unit reported on Mohamed Atta and described him as the ringleader of the World Trade Center and Pentagon attacks. He also reported on Zacarias Moussaoui’s alleged role in the attacks and his questioning by the Federal Bureau of Investigation prior to September 11.

His undercover investigation of nuclear smuggling, which questioned whether American authorities could stop a shipment of radioactive material from entering the country, received the duPont Award in 2004.

On May 24, 2006, Ross first reported that the Justice Department was investigating Speaker of the House Dennis Hastert for possible connections to the Jack Abramoff corruption scandal. Both the Justice Department and Dennis Hastert issued denials, but Ross insisted the story was correct. He did say that the investigation might eventually "wash out and be nothing".

On September 6, 2006, Ross reported that Pakistan had decided not to seek the capture of Osama bin Laden so long as bin Laden acted "like a peaceful citizen". Pakistan denied the report. The report was based on a telephone interview in which ABC quoted the Pakistani General as saying, "Q. ABC News: If bin Laden or Zawahiri were there, they could stay? A. Gen. Sultan: No one of that kind can stay. If someone is there he will have to surrender, he will have to live like a good citizen, his whereabouts, exit travel would be known to the authorities."

On September 29, 2006, Ross reported that Rep. Mark Foley sent underage male congressional aides sexually explicit internet messages; the ensuing scandal led to Foley's resignation. His 2006 investigation into the Congressional page scandal involving Foley resulted in his fifth Peabody Award for his series of reports: “Conduct Unbecoming”. That series also garnered Ross an Emmy Award, a Peabody Award, a USC Annenberg Walter Cronkite Award for Excellence in Television Political Journalism, an Investigative Reporters and Editors Award, the 2007 National Headliner Award for Television Affiliated Online Journalism, and the Online News Association Journalism Award.

Ross received the 2007 Edward R. Murrow Award for investigative reporting for a two-part "20/20" undercover investigation into retail pharmacy errors, focusing on large drugstore chains, including CVS and Walgreens. He also received a 2007 Business Emmy for his work in exposing conflicts of interest of some West Virginia State Supreme Court justices.

When the Madoff investment scandal broke in December 2008, Ross covered Bernard Madoff, his family and associates and reported on how the scam had been perpetrated over the years. His reporting on the subject led to his first book, The Madoff Chronicles: Inside the Secret World of Bernie and Ruth, published in 2009.

In November 2009, Ross co-wrote an article titled "Officials: Army Told of Hasan's Contacts with al Qaeda", which claimed that Fort Hood shooter Nidal Hasan had made attempts to "make contact with people associated with al Qaeda". He made the same claims on Good Morning America. Other reporters said that Nidal's contact was limited to emails to his former imam, Anwar al-Awlaki, who had also been the imam of two of the September 11 terrorists.

In 2010, Ross received his seventh duPont-Columbia Award for the “20/20” investigation “The Coach’s Secret”, which exposed a scandal in youth swimming. This report also earned him a 2011 CINE Golden Eagle Award. Ross's investigation, “Taking on Toyota”, which prompted one of the largest automobile recalls in history, was awarded the Edward R. Murrow Award from the Radio Television Digital News Association in 2011. This report was publicly disputed by Toyota, which demonstrated that the "Toyota Death Ride" was largely fabricated by experts that were working for several trial lawyers with litigation pending against Toyota.

On July 19, 2011, according to the presidential campaign of Michele Bachmann, when attempting to question Bachmann about her migraines, Ross "rushed toward" Bachmann and her staff and "disregarded repeated requests to stay back". According to Michael Crowley, a reporter for Time who witnessed the resulting intervention by Bachmann staffers, the staffers "pounced on [Ross], grabbing and pushing him multiple times with what looked [...] like unusual force. In fact, [Crowley had] never seen a reporter treated so roughly at a campaign event, especially not a presidential one." Ross said he'd only been treated like that before "mostly by Mafia people." Ross appeared on The View and various media outlets to discuss the incident. The media also underscored 'concerns' regarding Bachmann's health.

Over a 10-month period in 2011, Ross and Anna Schecter reported on the murder of a 24-year-old Peace Corps volunteer in West Africa. Ross and Schecter received the 2011 George Polk Award for Television Reporting for this series of reports.

In 2012, Ross earned his sixth George Polk Award, sixth Peabody Award and second Emmy Award, including best investigation in a news magazine story for his “20/20” investigation “Peace Corps: A Trust Betrayed”, which exposed the cover-up of sexual abuse of Peace Corps volunteers and led to Congressional hearings and calls for new legislation. He was also the recipient of a 2012 Gracie Award for the report.

In 2013, Ross won the Hillman Prize and CINE Golden Eagle Award for his report Tragedy in Bangladesh and "Outstanding Investigative Program or Feature" at the 2013 Gracie Awards for Undercover Granny: Medicare Fraud.

Ross and his lead producer, Rhonda Schwartz, were suspended in the wake of his misreporting with regard to the Michael Flynn affair. They were transferred to Lincoln Square Productions upon their return. However, on July 2, 2018, ABC announced Ross and Schwartz were leaving the network.

=== Law & Crime ===
In August 2018, Ross and his producer, Rhonda Schwartz, were hired at the Law & Crime network which “covers trials and crime 24/7,” as a lead investigative reporter and also to host his own weekly show called “Brian Ross Investigates”.

== Controversies ==
=== Errors in reporting ===
In October 2001, Ross twice falsely linked Iraq to the anthrax attacks in the United States. Both reports, based on anonymous "high level" sources, were denied by the George W. Bush administration. In November 2001, Ross "updated" the story, acknowledging that original reports of bentonite in the anthrax samples were incorrect. Glenn Greenwald severely criticized Ross for this reporting, opining that Ross unwittingly helped build support for the U.S. invasion of Iraq as a result of his high-profile report. Dan Froomkin asked in an August 5, 2008 column, in The Washington Post: "So who told ABC the powder looked Iraqi?" The New York Sun reported that Ross was the sixth journalist ordered by a federal judge to reveal his sources for federal anthrax attack stories.

On January 14, 2004, a report by Ross, Chris Vlasto, and Rhonda Schwartz on the eve of the Iowa caucus linked presidential candidate Howard Dean to a trooper who worked for him when he was Vermont's governor and who had “‘engaged in acts of domestic violence’”. ABC News was severely criticized by the Columbia Journalism Review for the report because the report presented no evidence to show that Dean was aware of the abuse when he wrote a character reference for the employee in a custody dispute. There was also evidence to suggest that Dean was unaware of the abuse at that time. The Columbia Journalism described the story as "little more than a smear."

In 2006, Ross broadcast what he described as a "big scoop" asserting that an al-Qaeda terrorist with links to Bin Laden had been arrested in Pakistan. But the story was untrue. Matiur Rehman, the al-Qaeda explosives expert, was still a fugitive. The Pakistani government called the story "fictitious." ABC retracted the story.

Ross and the ABC News Investigative Team were awarded the 2011 National Edward R. Murrow Award for “Video Continuing Coverage” for their exclusive investigation, “Taking On Toyota”, that revealed how the car company for years ignored complaints from hundreds of its owners about cars suddenly accelerating out of control. As a result, Toyota's market value and sales were driven down. It was later disclosed that Ross had staged the famous “death ride” in a Toyota set up to accelerate without driver input. Ross's report featured a doctored shot of a tachometer suddenly racing to 6,000 rpm.

During coverage of the 2012 Aurora, Colorado, shooting, Ross suggested on the air a connection between a member of a Colorado Tea Party group and the shooting, based on the gunman's name, without any confirmed evidence. Describing Ross as one of the most controversial reporters in television journalism, Dylan Byers reported that Ross had come "under attack again" for his reporting. Conservative website PJ Media called for his firing. Ross and ABC News President Ben Sherwood apologized for the comment.

=== Coverage of the investigation into Michael Flynn ===
On December 2, 2017, Ross was given a four-week suspension without pay after erroneously stating during a special report that Michael Flynn was preparing to testify that Donald Trump had directed him to make contact with Russian officials during his presidential campaign.

Ross issued a clarification on World News Tonight later that same day, explaining that Flynn had not been told to make contact with Russian officials until after the election, and that Trump had only asked Flynn and other advisors to "find ways to repair relations with Russia" during his campaign. Ross issued a clarification on World News Tonight later that same day, explaining that Flynn had not been told to make contact with Russian officials until after the election, and that Trump had only asked Flynn and other advisors to "find ways to repair relations with Russia."

"During a live Special Report, ABC News reported that a confidant of Lt. Gen. Michael Flynn said Flynn was prepared to testify that then-candidate Donald Trump instructed him to contact Russian officials during the campaign," the network's correction stated. "That source later clarified that during the campaign, Trump assigned Flynn and a small circle of other senior advisers to find ways to repair relations with Russia and other hot spots."

The incorrect report was criticized by conservative commentators, and the Dow Jones Industrial Average fell by 350 points after the report.

In early 2018, after Ross served a four-week unpaid suspension, he returned as a chief investigative correspondent, but with a separate unit of ABC, Lincoln Square Productions. However, in July, ABC announced Ross was leaving the network.

== Awards ==
- 1974 – Peabody Award: WCKTV “A Superb Series of Investigative Reports Which Brought Considerable Response & Change”
- 1974/75 – duPont-Columbia Award: “Teamster Power” (WKYC)
- 1983 – duPont- Columbia Award: “Outstanding Investigative Reporting”
- 1985 – duPont Columbia Award: “Outstanding Investigative Reporting"
- 1988 – George Polk Award: “War on Drugs/Money Laundering” (NBC)
- 1990 – Overseas Press Club Award: “Nuclear Power" •1991 Overseas Press Club Award – “French Spies”
- 1991 – Peabody Award: NBC News “B.C.C.I.”
- 1992 – George Polk Award: “Made in the USA” (NBC)
- 1994 – Overseas Press Club Award: “Made in China”
- 1997 – George Polk Award: “Blood Money”
- 1997 – Overseas Press Club Award: “Blood Money”
- 1998 – George Polk Award: “Shame of Saipan”
- 1998 – IRE Tom Renner Award: “Blood Money”
- 1998 – Overseas Press Club Award: “Nazi Stolen Art”
- 1999 – Peabody Award: “These Were Our Children”
- 2001 – Emmy Award: “ABC News Post 9/11 Investigation”
- 2001 – Peabody Award: “Coverage of September 11th"
- 2001 – Sigma Delta Chi: “ABC News 9-11 Investigation”
- 2001 – Society of Professional Journalists Sigma Delta Chi Award and Bronze Medallion: “Investigative Reports Post 9/11”
- 2001/02 – duPont-Columbia Award: “Coverage of 9/11”
- 2002 National Headliner Award: “From the Tower”
- 2003 – Gerald Loeb Award for Television Short Form business journalism: Enron Document Shredding
- 2003/04 – duPont-Columbia Award: “The Nuclear Smuggling Project”
- 2004 – National Headliner Award: “Charities Investigation”
- 2005 – Center for Public Integrity's International Consortium of Journalists: “UN Misconduct in the Congo”
- 2005 – George Polk Award: “CIA Secret Prisons”
- 2005 – Emmy Award: “The Money Trail”
- 2006 – Emmy Award: “Conduct Unbecoming”
- 2006 – Peabody Award:"Conduct Unbecoming"
- 2007 – National Headliner Award: "Mugus and Masters” and “The Mark Foley Investigation”
- 2007 – Peabody Award: “Conduct Unbecoming-The Mark Foley Scandal"
- 2007 – RTNDA Edward R. Murrow Award: “The Mark Foley Investigation”
- 2007 – USC Annenberg Walter Cronkite Award: “The Mark Foley Investigation”
- 2007/08 – duPont-Columbia Award– “Afghanistan: The Forgotten War”
- 2007/08 – Emmy Award: “The Multi-Million Dollar Appeal”
- 2008 – RTNDA Edward R. Murrow Award: “Pharmacy Errors”
- 2009 – Emmy Award: “Presidential Inauguration – Barack Obama”
- 2011 – duPont-Columbia Award: “The Coach’s Secret”
- 2011 – CINE Golden Eagle Award: “The Coach’s Secret”
- 2011 – George Polk Award- “Peace Corps: A Trust Betrayed”
- 2011 – RTNDA Edward R. Murrow Award: “Taking on Toyota”
- 2012 – Emmy Award: Best Report in News Magazine- “Peace Corps: A Trust Betrayed”
- 2012 – Gracie Award: “Peace Corps: A Trust Betrayed”
- 2013 – CINE Golden Eagle Award: “Tragedy in Bangladesh”
- 2013 – Gracie Award: “Undercover Granny: Medicare Fraud”
- 2014 – Gerald Loeb Award for Investigative Business Journalism: "Breathless and Burdened: Dying from Black Lung, Buried by Law and Medicine"
