= Computer-assisted reporting =

Computer-assisted reporting describes the use of computers to gather and analyze the data necessary to write news stories.

The spread of computers, software and the Internet changed how reporters work. Reporters routinely collect information in databases, analyze public records with spreadsheets and statistical programs, study political and demographic change with geographic information system mapping, conduct interviews by e-mail, and research background for articles on the Web.

Collectively this has become known as computer-assisted reporting, or CAR. It is closely tied to "precision" or analytic journalism, which refer specifically to the use of techniques of the social sciences and other disciplines by journalists.

== History and development ==
One researcher argues the "age of computer-assisted reporting" began in 1952, when CBS television used a UNIVAC I computer to analyze returns from the U.S. presidential election. One of the earliest examples came in 1967, after riots in Detroit, when Philip Meyer of the Detroit Free Press used a mainframe computer to show that people who had attended college were equally likely to have rioted as were high school dropouts.

Since the 1950s, computer-assisted developed to the point that databases became central to the journalist's work by the 1980s. In his book, Precision Journalism, the first edition of which was written in 1969, Philip Meyer argues that a journalist must make use of databases and surveys, both computer-assisted. In the 2002 edition, he goes even further and states that "a journalist has to be a database manager".

In 2001, computers had reached a critical mass in American newsrooms in terms of general computer use, online research, non-specialist content searching, and daily frequency of online use, showing that CAR had become ubiquitous in the United States.

== Tools and techniques ==
The techniques expanded from polling and surveying to a new opportunity for journalists: using the computer to analyze huge volumes of government records. The first example of this type may have been Clarence Jones of The Miami Herald, who in 1969 worked with a computer to find patterns in the criminal justice system. Other notable early practitioners included David Burnham of The New York Times, who in 1972 used a computer to expose discrepancies in crime rates reported by the police; Elliot Jaspin of The Providence Journal, who in 1986 matched databases to expose school bus drivers with bad driving histories and criminal records; and Bill Dedman of The Atlanta Journal-Constitution, who received the Pulitzer Prize for his 1988 investigation, The Color of Money, which dealt with mortgage lending discrimination and redlining in middle-income black neighborhoods.

== Professional organizations ==
In the last 15 years, journalism organizations such as the National Institute for Computer-Assisted Reporting (NICAR, a program of Investigative Reporters and Editors) and the Danish International Center for Analytical Reporting (DICAR), have been created solely to promote the use of CAR in newsgathering. Many other organizations, such as the Society of Professional Journalists, the Canadian Association of Journalists and the University of King's College in Halifax, Nova Scotia, offer CAR training or workshops. Journalists have also created mailing lists to share ideas about CAR, including NICAR-L, CARR-L and JAGIS-L.

== See also ==
- Automated journalism
- Data-driven journalism
