= Cheryl Reed =

American author and journalist

Cheryl L. Reed (born 1966) is an American author and journalist. She won the 1996 Harvard Goldsmith Prize for Investigative Reporting while at the Dayton Daily News. She is the author of Poison Girls, and Unveiled: The Hidden Lives of Nuns, a work of literary journalism.

Reed graduated from the Missouri School of Journalism, with a BA in news writing and photojournalism, and from Ohio State University with a MA, and where she was a 1996 Kiplinger Fellow. She has a Master of Fine Arts degree in fiction from Northwestern University. She has been a resident at Ragdale, the Vermont Studio Center, New York Mills, Hedgebrook and Norcroft.

== Career ==
=== Journalistic career ===
Reed was a reporter at the Chicago Sun-Times, Dayton Daily News, the Newport News Daily Press, and Florida Today. Her work has appeared in Mother Jones, U.S. News & World Report, The Philadelphia Inquirer Magazine, Salon, and the Minneapolis Star-Tribune. Reed also served as senior editor for publications at the University of Chicago Medical Center, in Chicago, Illinois.

In 1996 she, and her colleagues at the Dayton Daily News, were nominated as finalists for the Pulitzer Prize in Reporting for "Military Secrets" and "Prisoners on the Payroll," a series of investigations into handling misconduct cases in the military. They won Harvard University's Goldsmith Prize for Investigative Reporting, for the same series that year.

She was a books editor, and editor of the editorial page at the Chicago Sun-Times. Reed left the Chicago Sun-Times in 2008, unable to fulfill her promise to change the editorial stance from conservative to progressive, having previously vowed to '"return the paper to its "liberal, working-class roots" and to add "seats to our editorial board so that board members ... reflect [Chicago's] diversity."'

In 2018, she won the Chicago Writers Book of the Year award, for Poison Girls, in the traditional fictional category.

=== Academic career ===
Reed was visiting professor of journalism at the University of St. Thomas, and was previously an assistant professor of journalism at Northern Michigan University, (NMU) and its adviser to NMU's student newspaper The North Wind for the 2014–15 academic year.

She was a Fulbright U.S. Scholar in Kyiv, Ukraine, (2016-2017) where she taught investigative reporting and immersion journalism. In the fall of 2019, she returned to Ukraine, as a Fulbright Specialist teaching investigative journalism. According to her biography, she has plans to go to Kazakhstan, Uzbekistan and Kyrgyzstan as a Fulbright Scholar, in 2021.

==== Controversy ====
Reed was voted out of the position as the adviser at Northern Michigan University (NMU) the end of the school year by the newspaper's board of directors, for what Reed claimed was retaliation on the investigative journalism she was teaching her students. Reed brought the board members to federal court in June 2015, but she later pulled out from the case when the judge denied a preliminary injunction that would have reinstated her as adviser. Reed advocated for a new law that offers further protections for student speech and prevents schools and universities from retaliating against media advisors for material written by students.

In April 2016, NMU was awarded the national muzzle award, by Thomas Jefferson Center for the Protection of Free Expression for its treatment of Reed and the student newspaper. In November 2016, the American Association of University Professors issued a report, "Threats to the Independence of Student Media," citing NMU and its treatment of Reed and the student newspaper as an example of aggressive behavior to stifle investigative reporting.

== Personal ==
Reed is married to former Chicago Tribune editor Greg Stricharcuk.

== Works ==
- Poison Girls. Diversion Books. 2017. ISBN 978-1682308264.; Diversion Books, 2017, ISBN 978-1682308264
- Unveiled: The Hidden Lives of Nuns. Berkley Books. 2004. ISBN 978-0-425-19511-6.; Penguin, 2010, ISBN 978-0-425-23238-5

== Awards and recognition ==
- 1996 Finalist, Pulitzer Prize for National Reporting, (with Carol Hernandez, Jeff Nesmith and Cheryl Reed) Dayton Daily News, "Military Secrets" and "Prisoners on the Payroll", investigations into handling misconduct cases in the military
- 1996 Winner, Harvard University's Goldsmith Prize for Investigative Reporting, (with Carol Hernandez, Jeff Nesmith and Cheryl Reed) Dayton Daily News, "Military Secrets" and "Prisoners on the Payroll"
- 2018 Winner, Book of the Year, for Traditional Fiction, Poison Girls.
