= 1992 Pulitzer Prize =

Awards for journalism and related fields

The following are the Pulitzer Prizes for 1992.

== Journalism awards ==
- Public Service:
  - The Sacramento Bee, For "The Sierra in Peril," reporting by Tom Knudson that examined environmental threats and damage to the Sierra Nevada mountain range in California.
- Spot News Reporting:
  - Staff of Newsday, For coverage of a midnight subway derailment in Manhattan that left five passengers dead and more than 200 injured.
- Investigative Reporting:
  - Lorraine Adams and Dan Malone of The Dallas Morning News, For reporting that charged Texas police with extensive misconduct and abuses of power.
- Explanatory Journalism:
  - Robert S. Capers and Eric Lipton of Hartford Courant, For a series about the flawed Hubble Space Telescope that illustrated many of the problems plaguing America's space program.
- Beat Reporting:
  - Deborah Blum of The Sacramento Bee, For her series, "The Monkey Wars," which explored the complex ethical and moral questions surrounding primate research.
- National Reporting:
  - Jeff Taylor and Mike McGraw of The Kansas City Star, For their critical examination of the U.S. Department of Agriculture.
- International Reporting:
  - Patrick J. Sloyan of Newsday, For his reporting on the Persian Gulf War, conducted after the war was over, which revealed new details of American battlefield tactics and "friendly fire" incidents.
- Feature Writing:
  - Howell Raines of The New York Times, For "Grady's Gift," an account of the author's childhood friendship with his family's black housekeeper and the lasting lessons of their relationship.
- Commentary:
  - Anna Quindlen of The New York Times, For her compelling columns on a wide range of personal and political topics.
- Criticism:
  - No Award Given
- Editorial Writing:
  - Maria Henson of Lexington Herald-Leader, For her editorials about battered women in Kentucky, which focused statewide attention on the problem and prompted significant reforms.
- Editorial Cartooning:
  - Signe Wilkinson of Philadelphia Daily News
- Spot News Photography:
  - The Staff of Associated Press, For photographs of the attempted coup in Russia and the subsequent collapse of the Communist regime.
- Feature Photography:
  - John Kaplan of Block Newspapers, For his photographs depicting the diverse lifestyles of seven 21-year-olds across the United States.

== Letters awards ==
- Fiction:
  - A Thousand Acres by Jane Smiley (Alfred A. Knopf)
- History:
  - The Fate of Liberty: Abraham Lincoln and Civil Liberties by Mark E. Neely, Jr. (Oxford University Press)
- Biography or Autobiography:
  - Fortunate Son: The Healing of a Vietnam Vet by Lewis B. Puller, Jr. (Grove Weidenfeld)
- Poetry:
  - Selected Poems by James Tate (Wesleyan University Press)
- General Nonfiction:
  - The Prize: The Epic Quest For Oil, Money & Power by Daniel Yergin (Simon & Schuster)

== Arts awards ==
- Drama:
  - The Kentucky Cycle by Robert Schenkkan (Plume)
- Music:
  - The Face of the Night, the Heart of the Dark by Wayne Peterson (Henmar Press)

Premiered on October 17, 1991, by the San Francisco Symphony

== Special awards and citations ==
- Letters:
  - Maus by Art Spiegelman
