= List of awards won by The Washington Post =

The following is a list of awards won by the American newspaper The Washington Post.

== Pulitzer Prizes ==
The Washington Post has won 65 Pulitzer Prizes in journalism, the second highest of any newspaper or magazine in the United States. It has won the gold medal for Public Service, the most distinguished award, six times. The newspaper won its first prize in 1936 for Editorial Writing and its most recent in 2022.

== General awards ==
=== Aldo Beckman Award ===
The Aldo Beckman Award for Overall Excellence in White House Coverage, also known as The Aldo Beckman Award, is an annual award given by the White House Correspondents' Association for "overall excellence" in White House coverage.

Year	Recipient
2003	Dana Milbank
2009	Michael Abramowitz
2012	Scott Wilson
2017	Greg Jaffe

=== Alfred I. duPont-Columbia University Award ===
The Alfred I. duPont–Columbia University Award, presented by the Columbia University Graduate School of Journalism, honors excellence in broadcast and digital journalism.

Year	Entry	Notes
2019	"The Whistleblower" & "Too Big to Prosecute"	Co-winner with 60 Minutes
2021	"Lafayette Reconstruction"	

=== Bastiat Prize ===
The Bastiat Prize was an annual journalism award, given by the Reason Foundation, that recognizes journalists whose writing "best demonstrates the importance of freedom with originality, wit, and eloquence."

Year	Recipient
2017	Radley Balko

=== Edward R. Murrow Award ===
The Edward R. Murrow Award is an annual award that honors the best achievements in digital journalism.

Year	Category	Entry	Notes	Ref(s).
2004	Website Non-Broadcast (Over 200,000 circulation)	washingtonpost.com		
2005	Website Non-Broadcast (Over 200,000 circulation)	washingtonpost.com		
2006	Website Non-Broadcast (Over 200,000 circulation)	washingtonpost.com		
2007	Website Non-Broadcast (Over 200,000 circulation)	washingtonpost.com		
2012	Breaking News	"Congresswoman Gabrielle Giffords Shot in Tucson"		
2012	Use of Video	"Under Suspicion: Voices about Muslims in America"		
2012	Website	washingtonpost.com		
2013	Overall Excellence	Portfolio		
2013	Investigative Reporting	"Convicted defendants left uninformed of forensic flaws found by Justice Dept."		
2014	Overall Excellence	Portfolio		
2014	Feature Reporting	"Shelley & Bill: A Love Story"		
2015	Feature Reporting	"Romanian Orphan"		
2015	Investigative Reporting	"Your Property Is Guilty"		
2015	Writing	"Lee Powell writing"		
2016	Overall Excellence	Portfolio		
2016	Continuing Coverage	"Ten Years after Katrina"		
2016	Writing	"There's a better way to stand in line but you won't like it"		
2017	Continuing Coverage	"America's Opioid Crisis"		
2017	Excellence in Social Media	Portfolio		
2017	Excellence in Writing	"Lee Powell writing"		
2017	Reporting: Hard News	"Tainted Water, Little Hope"		
2018	Video: Investigative Reporting	"Too Big To Prosecute"	Co-winner with 60 Minutes	
2018	Digital: Investigative Reporting	"Hacking Democracy: The Russian Investigation"		
2019	News Documentary	"The Foreign Consultant"		
2020	Digital: Overall Excellence	Portfolio		
2021	Breaking News Coverage	"How a night of protest turned deadly in Kenosha"		
2021	Excellence in Writing	"Politics and Airlines in a pandemic"		

=== George Polk Awards ===
The George Polk Awards in Journalism, also known as the George Polk Awards, are an annual journalism award, given by Long Island University, honoring the best reporting in a number of categories.

Year	Category	Recipients	Description of entry	Notes
1961	Local Reporting	Laurence Stern	for a series on troubled savings & loan institutions in Maryland.	
1962	Special Award	Morton Mintz	for stories on the fight to keep the drug thalidomide off the market.	
1965	Foreign Reporting	Dan Kurzman	for coverage of a revolt in the Dominican Republic.	
1966	National Reporting	Richard Harwood	for exposing the FBI's use of unauthorized wiretapping.	
1968	National Reporting	Bernard D. Nossiter	for exploring how the aerospace industry might fare in a peacetime economy.	
1970	Editorials	James E. Clayton	for raising questions about U.S. Supreme Court nominee G. Harrold Carswell.	
1971	Criticism	Richard Hardwood	for “The News Business,” a column evaluating American journalism.	
1972	National Reporting	Carl Bernstein and Bob Woodward	for bringing to public attention the Watergate bugging story.	
1972	Community Service	Ronald Kessler	for two series, on hospital mismanagement and illegal fees charged to homebuyers.	
1977	National Reporting	Walter Pincus	for revealing Defense Department plans to develop a neutron bomb.	
1978	National Reporting	Ronald Kessler	for articles on corruption in the General Services Administration.	
1980	National Reporting	Jonathan Neuman and Ted Gup	for a series on conflicts of interest in awarding of federal contracts.	
1983	Medical Reporting	Benjamin Weiser	for "As They Lay Dying," a series on removing hopelessly ill patients from life support.	
1987	Foreign Reporting	Nora Boustany	for stories on Palestinian refugees and “the breakdown of civilization in Lebanon.”	
1989	National Reporting	Rick Atkinson	for a series on the secret history of the B-2 Stealth bomber.	
1990	Foreign Reporting	Caryle Murphy	for chronicling the Iraqi invasion of Kuwait as she remained in hiding inside the country.	
1993	Foreign Reporting	Keith Richburg	for chronicling the effects of war and famine in Somalia.	
1995	National Reporting	Michael Weisskopf and David Maraniss	for “Inside the Revolution,” a series on the inner workings of the first Republican-controlled House of Representatives in 40 years.	
1997	International Reporting	Michael Dobbs	or tracing Madeleine Albright's Jewish roots, unknown to her even though many in her family died in Nazi concentration camps	
1998	Economic Reporting	Mary Jordan, Keith Richburg, and Kevin Sullivan	for a series on the human toll of Asia's economic crisis.	
2000	National Reporting	Michael Grunwald	for analyzing risky billion-dollar projects undertaken by the Army Corps of Engineers.	
2005	Foreign Reporting	Joe Stephens and David B. Ottaway	for documenting false claims and sweeping failures in an American program to reconstruct schools and clinics in Afghanistan.	
2005	National Reporting	Dana Priest	for exposing a secret network of detention centers in Eastern Europe where the C.I.A. held terrorism suspects.	
2007	Political Reporting	Barton D. Gellman and Jo Becker	for a series on Vice President Dick Cheney's role as the architect of tortuous interrogation, military tribunals and other hard-line U.S. policies.	
2010	National Reporting	Dana Priest and William M. Arkin	for “Top Secret America,” detailing the proliferation of a huge ecosystem of military, intelligence and corporate interests spawned after 9/11.	
2012	Medical Reporting	Peter Whoriskey	for “Biased Research, Big Profits,” a series on pharmaceutical industry payoffs to doctors to promote misleading findings sometimes endangering patients.	
2013	National Reporting	Eli Saslow	for profiling six of the families receiving federal nutrition assistance in a $78 billion program serving 47 million recipients in a program that tripled in scope in a decade.	
2013	National Security Reporting	Barton Gellman	for investigative stories on massive NSA surveillance based on top-secret documents disclosed by former intelligence analyst Edward Snowden.	Co-winners with The Guardian
2013	Political Reporting	Rosalind Helderman, Laura Vozzella, and Carol Leonnig	for revealing that the Virginia governor and his wife received $165,000 in loans and gifts from an entrepreneur.	
2014	National Reporting	Carol Leonnig	for series of exclusive reports on serious security lapses and misconduct by the U.S. Secret Service, which filed false and incomplete accounts of the missteps.	
2015	National Reporting	Staff	for a series tallying and categorizing Americans shot dead by police over the course of a year.	
2015	Regional Reporting	Terrence McCoy	for exposing companies in Maryland and Virginia that convinced unsophisticated victims to accept pennies on the dollar for court-ordered compensation.	
2016	Political Reporting	David A. Fahrenthold	for a string of stories on matters Presidential candidate Donald Trump had long sought to keep secret, including his foundation's deceptive activities and the existence of a video in which he bragged about sexually assaulting women.	
2016	Political Reporting	Lenny Bernstein, Scott Higham, and David Fallis	for tracing the DEA's lax regulation of narcotic painkillers despite a deadly national addiction epidemic to drug industry pressure.	
2017	Political Reporting	Stephanie McCrummen and Beth Reinhard	for disclosing accounts of Alabama Senate candidate Roy Moore's sexual assault upon a 14-year-old girl and pursuit of other teenagers.	
2017	Special Award	Staff	for revealing ties between the Trump campaign and Kremlin-connected Russians that gave rise to the investigation into possible collusion during the 2016 election.	Co-winner with The New York Times
2018	Special Award	David Ignatius and Karen Attiah	for eloquence and resolve in demanding accountability in the wake of the gruesome murder of Post columnist Jamal Khashoggi.	
2019	Military Reporting	Craig Whitlock	for “The Afghanistan Papers,” for exposing an official study detailing two decades of failed U.S. policy.	
2020	Oral History	Eli Saslow	for 25 compelling personal narratives based on extensive interviews of individuals deeply affected by the COVID-19 virus.	
2020	Political Reporting	Stephanie McCrummen	for deftly capturing Georgia's shifting political winds in three perceptive profiles.	
2020	State Reporting	Ian Shapira	for stories exposing overt racism at the state-supported Virginia Military Institute.	
2020	Justice Reporting	Staff	a six-part series illustrating how uncanny a match Floyd's life and death were for the national movement his murder came to symbolize.	

=== Gerald Loeb Award ===
The Gerald Loeb Award for Distinguished Business and Financial Journalism, also known as the Gerald Loeb Award, is a recognition of excellence in journalism, especially in the fields of business, finance and the economy.

Year	Category	Authors	Entry	Notes
1971	Editorial	Philip Greer	"Wall Street Changes"	
1978	Columns/Editorials	Hobart Rowen	"IMF, World Bank Face Grave Issues"	
1981	Large Newspapers	Jonathan Neumann and Ted Gu	"Government Out of Control: Contracts"	
1984	Large Newspapers	Dan Morgan	"High Tech: Leaving Home Series"	
1984	Medium Newspapers	Ted Gup	"The King of Gems Series"	
1990	Large Newspapers	David A. Vise and Steve Coll	"The Man from Wall Street: John Shad's Reign at the SEC"	
1992	Lifetime Achievement Award	Hobart Rowen		
2000	Deadline and/or Beat Writing	Ianthe Jeanne Dugan	"The Rise of Day Trading"	
2000	Commentary	David Ignatius	"Business and Technology Columns"	
2003	Large Newspapers	Alec Klein	"AOL's Advertising Deals"	
2004	Large Newspapers	David B. Ottaway and Joe Stephens	"Big Green"	
2006	Commentary	Steven Pearlstein	"Business and Economic Columns"	Tied with The Wall Street Journal
2011	Lifetime Achievement Award	Steven Pearlstein		
2014	Large Newspapers	Barton Gellman, Laura Poitras, Ellen Nakashima, Craig Timberg, Steven Rich, and Ashkan Soltani	"Five of the NSA Stories"	
2021	Beat Reporting	Kimberly Kindy, Taylor Telford, Robert Klemko, Abha Bhattarai, Nicole Dungca, Jenn Abelson and Meryl Kornfield	"Essential Workers on the Front Lines"	Tied with The Wall Street Journal
2021	Commentary	Michelle Singletary	"Sincerely, Michelle"	
2021	Feature	Greg Jaffe	"The Recession's Reach in Florida"	

== Herblock Prize ==
The Herblock Prize is an annual journalism award, given by the Herb Block Foundation, for excellence in editorial cartooning. The award is named after Post cartoonist Herbert Block.

Year	Recipient
2011	Tom Toles

=== Hillman Prize ===
The Hillman Prize is an annual journalism award, presented by The Sidney Hillman Foundation, honoring journalists, writers, and public figures "who pursue social justice and public policy for the common good."

Year	Category	Recipient	Description of Entry	Notes
1955	Newspaper	Murray Marder	for articles on the government security program	
1971	Newspaper	Alfred Friendly	for "Victims of the Great American Red Hunt"	
1973	Newspaper	Carl Bernstein and Robert Woodward	for the Watergate investigation	
2009	Photojournalism	Carol Guzy	for "Birth and Death: Maternal Mortality in Sierra Leone"	
2010	Blog	Ezra Klein	for Wonkblog	
2017	Newspaper	David A. Fahrenthold	for reporting on the Trump Foundation and 2016 presidential election	
2018	Broadcast	Scott Higham and Lenny Bernstein	for "The Whistleblower" and "Too Big to Prosecute"	Co-winner with 60 Minutes

=== John Chancellor Award ===
The John Chancellor Award for Excellence in Journalism, also known as the John Chancellor Award, is an annua journalisml award given by the Columbia University Graduate School of Journalism, honoring one reporting with "courage, character and integrity for cumulative professional accomplishments."

Year	Recipient
2003	Mary McGrory
2017	Dan Balz

=== Livingston Awards ===
The Livingston Awards is an annual journalism award, given by the University of Michigan, recognizing journalists under the age of 35 for local, national, and international coverage.

Year	Category	Recipient	Entry	Ref.
1986	Excellence in International Reporting	Blaine Harden	"Notes of a Famine Watcher"	
1987	Excellence in Local Reporting	Benjamin L. Weiser	"No Exit: Juvenile Justice in Washington"	
1990	Excellence in Local Reporting	Michele Norris	"Six-Year-Old's Maryland Home was a Modern Day Opium Den"	
1991	Excellence in International Reporting	David Remnick	"Millions of Soviet Lives Pervaded by Poverty"	
1992	Excellence in International Reporting	Steve Coll	"Crisis and Change in South Asia"	
1999	Excellence in National Reporting	Laura Meckler	"Organ Transplantation"	
2003	Excellence in International Reporting	Philip P. Pan	"High Tide of Labor Unrest in China"	
2013	Excellence in National Reporting	Rachel Manteuffel	"The Things They Leave Behind"	
2021	Excellence in National Reporting	Hannah Dreier	"Trust and Consequences"	
2022	Excellence in National Reporting	Jose A. Del Real	"Truth, Trust, and Conspiracy Theories in America"	

=== Peabody Award ===
The George Foster Peabody Awards, also known as Peabody Awards or the Peabodys, is an annual award that recognizes distinguished achievement and meritorious public service by television and radio stations, networks, producing organizations, individuals, and the World Wide Web."

Year	Entry	Notes
2010	"The Cost of War: Traumatic Brain Injury; Coming Home a Different Person"	
2017	"The Whistleblower"	Awarded jointly with CBS' 60 Minutes
2021	"The Life of George Floyd"	
2022	"Fatal Force"	

=== Robert F. Kennedy Journalism Award ===
The Robert F. Kennedy Awards for Excellence in Journalism is an annual journalism award, named after Robert F. Kennedy, and given by the Robert F. Kennedy Center for Justice and Human Rights. The awards honor journalism's best work in several categories.

Year	Category	Recipient	Entry title
1994	International Print	Molly Moore, John Anderson, Julia Preston, Lena Sun, and Caryle Murphy	"Third World, Second Class"
1995	Print	Leon Dash	"Rosa Lee's Story"
2000	Grand Prize	Peter Finn	"Kosovo"
2000	International Print	Peter Finn	"Kosovo"
2001	International Photojournalism	Dudley Brooks	"Thou Shalt Not Kill"
2001	International Print	Steve Coll	"Peace Without Justice"
2001	Lifetime Achievement	Herbert Block	
2002	Grand Prize	Sari Horwitz, Scott Higham, and Sarah Cohen	"The District's Lost Children"
2002	Domestic Print	Sari Horwitz, Scott Higham, and Sarah Cohen	"The District's Lost Children"
2002	International Print	David Finkel	"Invisible Journeys"
2004	International Honorable Mention	Anthony Shadid	"The Soul of Iraq"
2008	Grand Prize	Anne Hull and Dana Priest	"The Other Walter Reed"
2009	Grand Prize (International Photo)	Carol Guzy	"Birth and Death"
2010	Domestic Photography	Carol Guzy	"No Greater Love"
2010	International Photography	Sarah Voisin	“In Mexico's war on drugs, battle lines are drawn in chalk”
2014	Domestic Print	Debbie Cenziper, Michael Sallah, and Steven Rich	“Homes for the Taking: Liens, Loss and Profiteers”
2015	Cartoon	Darrin Bell	"Darrin Bell 2014 Editorial Cartoons"
2015	International Photography	Michel du Cille	"Ebola: A Desperate Struggle"
2018	International Photography	Michael Robinson Chavez, Joshua Partlow, Nick Kirpatrick, and MaryAnne Golon	“Mexico's Misery”
2019	Domestic Photography	Carolyn Van Houten	“The Road to Asylum: Inside the Migrant Caravans”
2020	International Print	Craig Whitlock	"The Afghanistan Papers"
2021	Radio	Amy Brittain, Reena Flores and Bishop Sand	"Canary: The Washington Post Investigates"
2022	Domestic Photography	Joshua Lott	"Social Injustice"

=== Scripps Howard Awards ===
The Scripps Howard Awards is an annual journalism award, given by the Scripps Howard Foundation, that honors the best work in journalism across more than a dozen categories from multiple platforms, including television stations, networks, visual media, and newspapers.

Year	Category	Recipient	Description of Entry	Notes	Ref.
2013	Investigative Reporting	Spenser S. Hsu	for "Forensic Science," a series that exposed the Justice Department's use of flawed data in more than 20,000 criminal convictions. Congress, the courts and the FBI have responded to the series, and now hundreds, if not thousands, of defendants will get another chance at justice.		
2017	Human Interest Storytelling	John Woodrow Cox	for “Children and Gun Violence,” an examination of how deadly gunfire impacts young people.		
2019	Breaking News	Staff of The Washington Post	for “The El Paso - Dayton Shooting:” coverage of mass shootings less than 24 hours apart in El Paso, Texas, and Dayton, Ohio, in which 29 people died.		
2020	Excellence in Human Interest Storytelling	Stephanie McCrummen	for telling poignant human stories about Georgia's changing demographics and evolving politics.		
2020	Excellence in Innovation	Harry Stevens	for "Flatten the Curve," a visual explainer that explored how viruses such as COVID-19 spread exponentially and how that spread can be mitigated, and even stopped, if social distancing protocols are diligently observed.		
2021	Excellence in National/International Investigative Reporting	Staff of The Washington Post	for "Pandora Papers," a global investigation involved more than 600 journalists at more than 140 news outlets in 117 countries, leading to 20 investigations, toppled multiple governments around the world, and led to anti-money laundering reform in the U.S.	Co-winner with the International Consortium of Investigative Journalists and other media partners	
2021	Impact Award	Staff of The Washington Post	for "Pandora Papers," a global investigation involved more than 600 journalists at more than 140 news outlets in 117 countries, leading to 20 investigations, toppled multiple governments around the world, and led to anti-money laundering reform in the U.S.	Co-winner with the International Consortium of Investigative Journalists and other media partners	

=== Sigma Delta Chi Awards ===
The Sigma Delta Chi Awards are an annual award, given by the Society of Professional Journalism, for excellence in journalism across multiple categories.

Year	Category	Recipient	Notes	Ref.
1999	Investigative Reporting	Katherine Boo		
1999	Feature Writing	David Finkel		
2000	Investigative Reporting	Joe A. Stephens, Mary Pat Flaherty, Deborah Nelson, Karen Deyoung, John Pomfret, Sharon LaFraniere, and Doug		
2000	Sports Column Writing	Michael Wilbon		
2000	Magazine	Peter Perl, of The Washington Post Magazine		
2001	Sports Column Writing	Sally Jenkins		
2002	Foreign Correspondence	Mary Jordan and Kevin Sullivan		
2005	Magazine Writing	Michael Leahy, of The Washington Post Magazine		
2007	Public Service	Staff of The Washington Post		
2007	Magazine Writing	Gene Weingarten		
2008	Sports Column Writing	Sally Jenkins		
2009	Washington Correspondence	Rajiv Chandrasekaran		
2010	Public Service	Dana Priest and William M. Arkin		
2010	Informational Graphics	Todd Lindeman, Brenna Maloney and David S. Fallis		
2010	Public Service in Online Journalism	Staff of The Washington Post		
2011	Non-Deadline Reporting	Staff of The Washington Post		
2011	Sports Column Writing	Sally Jenkins		
2012	Non-Deadline Reporting	Robert O'Harrow, Jr.		
2012	Washington Correspondence	David S. Fallis, Scott Higham, Kimberly Kindy, and Dan Keating		
2012	Public Service	Spencer S. Hsu		
2013	Washington Correspondence	David A. Fahrenthold		
2013	Informational Graphics	Todd Lindeman, Wilson Andrews, and Julie Tate		
2014	Washington Correspondence	David A. Fahrenthold		
2014	Informational Graphics	Staff of The Washington Post		
2015	Feature Reporting	Eli Saslow		
2015	Editorial Writing	Lee Hockstader		
2015	Public Service	Staff of The Washington Post		
2016	Investigative Reporting	Lenny Bernstein, David S. Fallis, and Scott Higham		
2016	Washington Correspondence	David A. Fahrenthold		
2017	Washington Correspondence	Staff of The Washington Post		
2017	General Column Writing	Petula Dvorak		
2017	Public Service in Television Journalism	Lenny Bernstein and Scott Higham	Co-winner with 60 Minutes	
2017	Audio Slide Show	Michael Cavna and Tom Racine		
2018	Sports Column Writing	Sally Jenkins		
2019	Deadline Reporting	Staff of The Washington Post		
2019	Immersion Journalism	John Woodrow Cox and Wesley Allsbrook		
2020	Feature Reporting	Jessica Contrera		
2021	Column Writing	Fernanda Santos		
2021	Columns (Spanish-language Print)	Abraham Jiménez Enoa,		

=== Walter Cronkite Award for Excellence in Journalism ===
The Walter Cronkite Award for Excellence in Journalism is an annual award presented by Arizona State University's Walter Cronkite School of Journalism and Mass Communication. The recipient is deemed to represent a leading figure in the journalism industry, especially for ground-breaking achievements which have advanced the industry as a whole.

Year	Recipient
1987	Katharine Graham
1998	Ben Bradlee
2001	Bob Woodward

== Investigative awards ==
=== Goldsmith Prize ===
The Goldsmith Prize for Investigative Reporting, also known as the Goldsmith Prize, is an annual award for journalists administered by the Shorenstein Center on Media, Politics and Public Policy at Harvard University.

Year	Author(s)	Entry
2008	Barton Gellman and Jo Becker	"Angler: The Cheney Vice Presidency"
2009	Debbie Cenziper and Sarah Cohen	"Forced Out"
2022	Hannah Dreier and Andrew Ba Tran	"FEMA's Disasters"

=== IRE Awards ===
The Investigative Reporters and Editors Award, also known as the IRE Awards, is an annual journalism award given by the Investigative Reporters and Editors, a nonprofit organization located at the University of Missouri School of Journalism.

Year	Category	Author	Entry
2019	FOI Award	Craig Whitlock	“The Afghanistan Papers: The Secret History of the War"
2021	IRE Award for Sports Investigations	Molly Hensley-Clancy	“National Women's Soccer League”

=== James Aronson Awards ===
The James Aronson Awards for Social Justice Journalism, also known as the James Aronson Awards, is an annual journalism award given by Hunter College, that honors "original, written English-language reporting from the U.S. media that brings to light widespread injustices, their human consequences, underlying causes, and possible reforms."

Year	Author(s)	Entry
1990	Kathy Kadane	"CIA's role in Indonesia"
2015	Sari Horwitz	"Justice in Indian Country"

=== Selden Ring Award ===
The Selden Ring Award for Investigative Reporting, also known as the Selden Ring Award, is an annual journalism award given by the Annenberg School for Communication and Journalism at the University of Southern California, that recognizes investigating reporting that has made an impact.

Year	Author(s)	Entry	Notes
1999	The Washington Post	“Deadly Force: An Investigation of D.C. Police Shootings”	
2000	Kathrine Boo	“The Rape Squad Files”	Co-winners with The Philadelphia Inquirer
2005	The Washington Post	"Drinking Water"	
2006	The Washington Post	“Investigating Abramoff – Special Report”	
2008	Anne Hull and Dana Priest	“Soldiers Face Neglect, Frustration At Army's Top Medical Facility”	

=== Sidney Awards ===
The Sidney Award is a monthly journalism award given out by The Sidney Hillman Foundation to "outstanding investigative journalism in service of the common good."

Year	Month	Author(s)	Entry	Ref.
2009	December	Dave Jamieson	“Health Care's Frequent Fliers: The Treatment of Kenny Farnsworth”	
2011	March	Greg Sargent	"Reporting about the Republican assault on public sector employees in Wisconsin"	
2016	October	David A. Fahrenthold	Series of stories about Donald Trump's "misuse and mismanagement of his personal foundation and his degrading and abusive comments about women."	
2019	July	Eli Saslow	"‘Urgent needs from head to toe’: This clinic had two days to fix a lifetime of needs"	
2020	January	Craig Whitlock	"The Afghanistan Papers"	
2021	July	Jay Green and Chris Alcantara	"Technology Amazon warehouse workers suffer serious injuries at higher rates than other firms"	
2022	January	Greg Jaffe	"The worker revolt comes to a Dollar General in Connecticut"	
2022	March	Hannah Knowles and Emmanuel Felton	"‘Stand your ground’ laws spread — and grow 'more extreme'— 10 years after Trayvon Martin's death"	

=== Toner Prizes ===
The Toner Prizes for Excellence in Political Reporting, also known as The Toner Prize, is an annual award, presented by the S.I. Newhouse School of Public Communications of Syracuse University, that honors the "best U.S. national or local political reporting in any medium or on any platform—print, broadcast or online."

Year	Recipient	Description of entry	Ref.
2014	Karen Tumulty	for her reporting on politicians, such as Senate Minority Leader Mitch McConnell of Kentucky and Sen. Ted Cruz, R-Texas, as well as her in-depth look at the political landscape in West Virginia.	
2015	Dan Balz	for a series of political profiles that illuminated the partisan divide in Washington.	
2017	David A. Fahrenthold	for “A Portrait of Donald Trump,” a series of articles highlighting his yearlong reporting on Trump.	
2018	Team from The Washington	for its coverage of candidate Roy Moore and the 2017 Alabama Senate race, which uncovered a pattern of sexual misconduct by Moore.	
2022	Team from The Washington Post	for "The Attack", an investigation into what happened before, during and after the 2021 United States Capitol attack.	

=== Worth Bingham Prize for Investigative Journalism ===
The Worth Bingham Prize, also referred to as the Worth Bingham Prize for Investigative Reporting, is an annual journalism award, presented by the Nieman Foundation for Journalism at Harvard University, honoring "newspaper or magazine investigative reporting of stories of national significance where the public interest is being ill-served."

Year	Author(s)	Entry
1970	James Clayton	Series of editorials criticizing President Nixon's nominee to the Supreme Court, G. Harrold Carswell
1972	Carl Bernstein and Bob Woodward	Bugging of Democratic National Headquarters at the Watergate
1974	Maxine Cheshire	Four-part series on whereabouts of state gifts to U.S. officials and their families from foreign leaders and dignitaries
1976	Morton Mintz	“The Medicine Business”: Why pharmaceutical disasters continue to occur
1980	Ted Gup and Jonathan Neumann	Five-part series exposing how companies bribed federal government officials for lucrative government consulting contracts
1987	Bob Woodward	Secrecy in Government (Reagan administration)
2000	Michael Grunwald	Series on Army Corps of Engineers
2005	Susan Schmidt, James V. Grimaldi, and R. Jeffrey Smith	Lobbying practices and influence of Jack Abramoff
2007	Anne Hull and Dana Priest	"Walter Reed and Beyond"
