= 1993 Pulitzer Prize =

Awards for journalism and related fields

The 1993 Pulitzer Prizes were:

== Journalism awards ==
- Public Service:
  - The Miami Herald, for coverage that not only helped readers cope with Hurricane Andrew's devastation but also showed how lax zoning, inspection and building codes had contributed to the destruction.
- Spot News Reporting:
  - Staff of the Los Angeles Times, for balanced, comprehensive, penetrating coverage under deadline pressure of the second, most destructive day of the Los Angeles riots.
- Investigative Reporting:
  - Jeff Brazil and Stephen Berry, Orlando Sentinel, for exposing the unjust seizure of millions of dollars from motorists—most of them minorities—by a sheriff's drug squad.
- Explanatory Journalism:
  - Mike Toner, The Atlanta Journal-Constitution, for "When Bugs Fight Back," a series that explored the diminishing effectiveness of antibiotics and pesticides.
- Beat Reporting:
  - Paul Ingrassia and Joseph B. White, The Wall Street Journal, for often exclusive coverage of General Motors' management turmoil.
- National Reporting:
  - David Maraniss, The Washington Post, for his revealing articles on the life and political record of candidate Bill Clinton.
- International Reporting:
  - Roy Gutman, Newsday, For his courageous and persistent reporting that disclosed atrocities and other human rights violations in Croatia and Bosnia and Herzegovina.
- Feature Writing:
  - George Lardner Jr., The Washington Post, for his unflinching examination of his daughter's murder by a violent man who had slipped through the criminal justice system.
- Commentary:
  - Liz Balmaseda, The Miami Herald, for her commentary from Haiti about deteriorating political and social conditions and her columns about Cuban-Americans in Miami.
- Criticism:
  - Michael Dirda, The Washington Post, for his book reviews.
- Editorial Writing:
  - No Award Given
- Editorial Cartooning:
  - Stephen R. Benson, The Arizona Republic
- Spot News Photography:
  - Ken Geiger and William Snyder, The Dallas Morning News, for their dramatic photographs of the 1992 Summer Olympics in Barcelona.
- Feature Photography:
  - Staff of Associated Press, for its portfolio of images drawn from the 1992 presidential campaign.

== Letters awards ==
- Fiction:
  - A Good Scent from a Strange Mountain by Robert Olen Butler (Henry Holt)
- History:
  - The Radicalism of the American Revolution by Gordon S. Wood (Alfred A. Knopf)
- Biography or Autobiography:
  - Truman by David McCullough (Simon & Schuster)
- Poetry:
  - The Wild Iris by Louise Glück (The Ecco Press)
- General Nonfiction:
  - Lincoln at Gettysburg: The Words That Remade America by Garry Wills (Simon & Schuster)

== Arts awards ==
- Drama:
  - Angels in America: Millennium Approaches by Tony Kushner (TCG)
- Music:
  - Trombone Concerto by Christopher Rouse (Boosey & Hawkes)

Premiered December 30, 1992, in New York by the New York Philharmonic.
