= 1969 Pulitzer Prize =

Awards for journalism and related fields

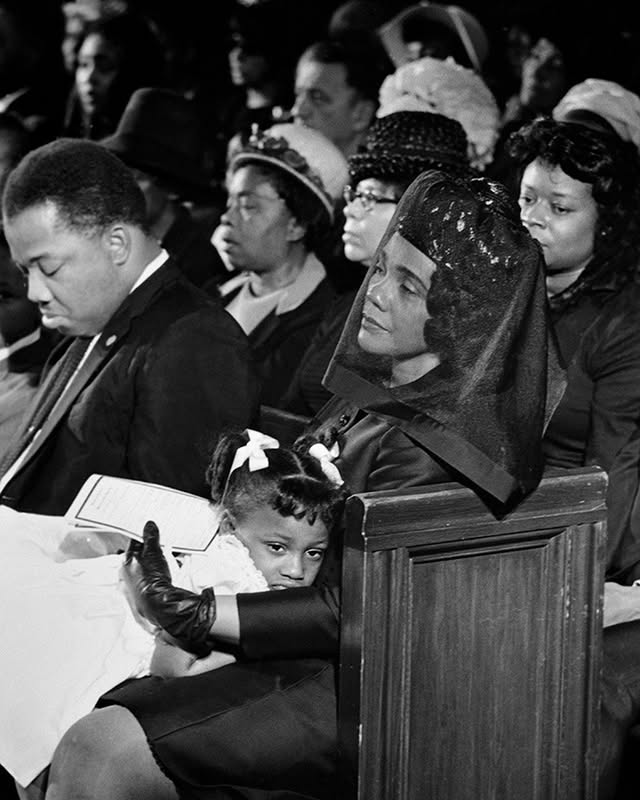
The winning feature photograph, of Coretta Scott King and Bernice King at the funeral of Martin Luther King Jr.

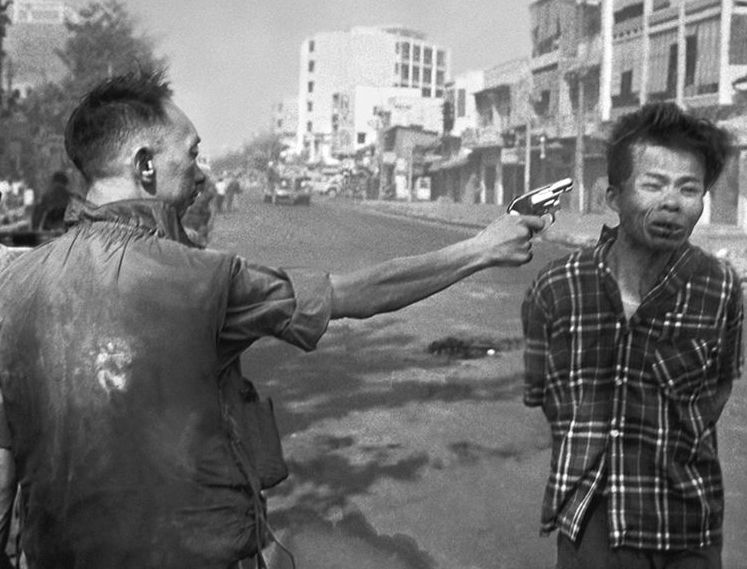
The winning spot news photograph, of the execution of Nguyễn Văn Lém

The following are the Pulitzer Prizes for 1969.

== Journalism awards ==
- Public Service:
  - The Los Angeles Times, for its exposé of wrongdoing within the Los Angeles City Government Commissions, resulting in resignations or criminal convictions of certain members, as well as widespread reforms.
- Local General or Spot News Reporting:
  - John Fetterman of The Louisville Times and The Courier-Journal, for his article, "Pfc. Gibson Comes Home", the story of an American soldier whose body was returned to his native town from Vietnam for burial.
- Local Investigative Specialized Reporting:
  - Al Delugach and Denny Walsh of the St. Louis Globe-Democrat, for their campaign against fraud and abuse of power within the St. Louis Steamfitters Union, Local 562.
- National Reporting:
  - Robert Cahn of The Christian Science Monitor, for his inquiry into the future of our national parks and the methods that may help to preserve them.
- International Reporting:
  - William Tuohy of the Los Angeles Times, for his Vietnam War correspondence in 1968.
- Editorial Writing:
  - Paul Greenberg of the Pine Bluff Commercial (Arkansas), for his editorials during 1968.
- Editorial Cartooning:
  - John Fischetti of the Chicago Daily News, for his editorial cartooning in 1968.
- Spot News Photography:
  - Edward T. Adams of the Associated Press, for his photograph, "Saigon Execution".
- Feature Photography:
  - Moneta Sleet Jr. of Ebony magazine, for his photograph of Martin Luther King Jr.'s widow and child, taken at Dr. King's funeral. (Magazines were not eligible for the Pulitzers, but Sleet's photograph qualified because it was distributed to newspapers through the Associated Press.)

== Letters, Drama and Music Awards ==
- Fiction:
  - House Made of Dawn by N. Scott Momaday (Harper).
- Drama:
  - The Great White Hope by Howard Sackler (Dial).
- History:
  - Origins of the Fifth Amendment by Leonard W. Levy (Oxford University Press).
- Biography or Autobiography:
  - The Man From New York: John Quinn and His Friends by Benjamin Lawrence Reid (Oxford University Press).
- Poetry:
  - Of Being Numerous by George Oppen (New Directions).
- General Nonfiction:
  - The Armies of the Night by Norman Mailer (World).
  - So Human An Animal by Rene Jules Dubos (Scribner).
- Music:
  - String Quartet No. 3 by Karel Husa (Associated Music Publishers).
    First performed at the Goodman Theatre, Chicago, on October 14, 1968, by the Fine Arts Quartet.
