= Stephanie McCrummen =

American journalist

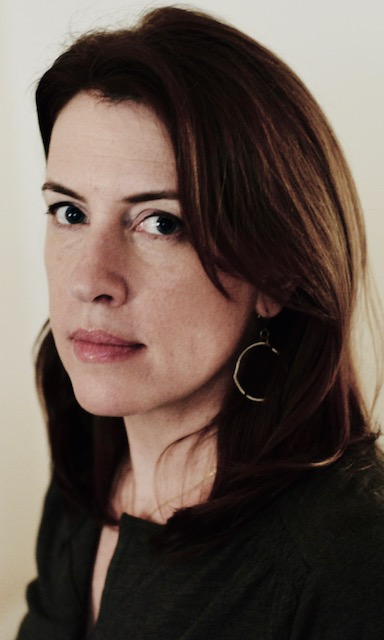
- McCrummen in 2018
- Born: Birmingham, Alabama, U.S.
- Education: University of North Carolina at Chapel Hill (BA); Columbia University Graduate School of Journalism (MA)
- Occupation: Journalist
- Employer: The Atlantic
- Awards: Pulitzer Prize (2018), George Polk Award (2018 and 2020)

Stephanie McCrummen is an American journalist who has worked for The Washington Post and The Atlantic. She has won several awards for her political journalism, including two George Polk Awards and a Pulitzer Prize.

== Early life and education ==
Born and raised in Birmingham, Alabama, McCrummen studied at the University of North Carolina at Chapel Hill, where she obtained a bachelor's degree in history, before graduating from the Columbia University Graduate School of Journalism in 1998.

== Career ==
After spending some time working for Newsday as a reporter, she moved to The Washington Post, where she served as the chief of their East Africa bureau, and then joined the national enterprise team, writing narratives about American life and politics.

McCrummen was a leading member of The Washington Post teams who won the 2018 Pulitzer Prize for Investigative Reporting and 2018 Toner Prize for Excellence in Political Reporting for their reporting on the Roy Moore sexual misconduct allegations during the 2017 United States Senate special election in Alabama. She and Beth Reinhard won the 2018 George Polk Award for Political Reporting for that same coverage. She won the 2020 George Polk Award for Political Reporting and 2020 Scripps Howard Award in Excellence in Human Interest Storytelling for her coverage of political trends within the state of Georgia.

In March 2023, she joined The Atlantic.
