= Edward J. Mowery =

American journalist

- Born: Edward Joseph Mowery; March 8, 1906; Lancaster, Ohio, United States
- Died: December 12, 1970 (aged 64)
- Occupation: Journalist
- Spouse: Margaret Josephine Ryan (m. 1938)
- Writing career
- Pen name: Paul Benjamin
- Notable awards: Pulitzer Prize for Investigative Reporting, 1953

Edward Joseph Mowery (1906 – 1970) was an American journalist who served as a feature writer and editor for many newspapers, including The Columbus Citizen, the New York Post, the Lancaster Daily Eagle, the New York World-Telegram, and the New York Herald Tribune.

== Biography ==
Mowery was born in Lancaster, Ohio, on March 8, 1906. His parents were Arlow Francis Mowery and Nelllie Cecilia O'Connor. He graduated from St. Mary's High School in 1923, and attended Ohio State University and the University of Notre Dame, where he majored in architectural design.

In 1932 he started a weekly suburban newspaper known as the Eastern News in Ohio, an experience that determined his future in the newspaper field.

After a job as managing editor of the Catholic Columbian, he became city editor of the Lancaster Daily Eagle, staff writer for the Associated Press, feature writer for the Columbus Sunday Dispatch, and later editor of the Lancaster Daily Eagle and its successor the Lancaster Eagle-Gazette.

In 1937 Mowery moved to New York for a job as a staff writer for King Features Syndicate. Shortly after he was transferred to the Home News of Brunswick, New Jersey, as an editorial writer.

Years later, he became the financial editor for the Newark Star-Ledger and staff writer on the New York Post.

In 1943 he joined the staff of the New York World-Telegram and Sun.

Since the early 1950s Mowery earned several journalism distinctions, including the Pulitzer Prize for Investigative Reporting in 1954 for a series of exclusive articles and stories which led to the release of Louis Hoffner, who had been falsely convicted of murder.

In 1966 Mowery wrote a syndicated column known as Inside View for the General Features syndication service.

He died December 12, 1970.

== Distinctions ==
- 1947, 1953 Pall Mall distinguished service "Big story" Award
- 1951 Society of Silurian Award
- 1952 American Legion Interfaith Gold Medal
- 1952 Outstanding Service Award, New York Criminal-Civil Courts Bar Association
- 1953 Pulitzer Prize for Investigative Reporting
- 1953 NBC Big Story award
- 1953 George Polk Memorial Award, Long Island University
- 1953 Frommer Award, Columbia University
