= Zengerle =

Zengerle is a surname. Notable people with the surname include:

- Jason Zengerle (fl. from 1992), American political journalist
- Mark Zengerle (born 1989), American professional ice hockey center
