= Steve Berry =

Steve Berry, Steven Berry or Stephen Berry may refer to:

== Stephen Berry ==
- R. Stephen Berry (1931–2020), emeritus chemistry professor at the University of Chicago
- Stephen Berry (journalist) (born 1948), American investigative journalist
- Stephen Berry (politician) (born 1983), New Zealand politician

== Steve Berry ==
- Steve Berry (novelist) (born 1955), American novelist
- Steve Berry (footballer) (born 1963), English footballer
- Steve Berry (presenter) (born 1964), presenter of BBC TV show Top Gear
- Steve Berry (Vermont politician), member of the Vermont House of Representatives

== Steven Berry ==
- S. Torriano Berry (Steven Torriano Berry, born 1958), American film producer, writer and director
- Steven T. Berry (born 1959), professor of economics at Yale
