= George A. Killenberg =

American newspaper editor

- Born: George A. Killenberg; March 30, 1917; East St. Louis, Illinois
- Died: May 20, 2008 (aged 91); Bel-Nor, Missouri
- Resting place: St. Michael's Church, Jacksonport, Wisconsin
- Education: McBride High School
- Alma mater: St. Louis University
- Occupation: Newspaper editor
- Employer: St. Louis Globe-Democrat
- Spouse: Therese (Murphy) Killenberg
- Children: George M. (Michael) Killenberg, Mary (Killenberg) Riley, John Killenberg, Terry (Killenberg) Hatcher, Susan (Killenberg) McGinn

George A. Killenberg (March 30, 1917 – May 20, 2008) was a notable American newspaper editor.

Killenberg was executive editor of the now defunct St. Louis Globe-Democrat, or the Globe as it was commonly called, from 1979 until retiring from the position in March 1984. His 43-year career at the newspaper began in 1941 when he was hired as a reporter. He later served as city editor (1956–1966) and managing editor (1966–1979).

== Early life, education ==
Killenberg was born in East St. Louis, Illinois, on March 30, 1917. His father, George Washington Killenberg (1892-1939), was the only son of German immigrants in East St. Louis. His mother, Lavina Ruhl (1890-1954) was youngest of four children born to second-generation German immigrants in New Athens, Illinois. Killenberg was the eldest of two children. His younger sister Miriam (Mimi) Killenberg was born in 1918.

Killenberg attended the now-defunct McBride High School, a Catholic high school for boys. Thereafter, he attended Saint Louis University, the oldest university west of the Mississippi River and the second-oldest Jesuit university in the United States. Killenberg suspended university studies to serve in the Army Medical Corps during World War II, ultimately earning a Bachelor of Science and a master's degree in American history upon his return.

== Career ==
=== Saint Louis University ===
While attending McBride High School, Killenberg was paid to provide scores and write stories about high school sports to the daily newspapers. After providentially meeting the director of sports information at Saint Louis University in the elevator at the St. Louis Star-Times, he was hired to replace him, though barely out of high school. The pay included free tuition to the university, and until the job came along, Killenberg had no hope of going to college. He was forced to leave the position when a new university president cut his salary along with the SLU football program, but continued studies at the university.

=== World War II ===
Killenberg suspended studies at St. Louis University and took leave from a job as a reporter at the St. Louis Globe-Democrat to join the Army Medical Corps during World War II. After the war, he returned to his job at the Globe and to SLU as a part-time student.

=== St. Louis Globe-Democrat ===
A short stint in public relations led him to the reporter job at the St. Louis Globe-Democrat. As a reporter, Killenberg covered the 1947 Centralia mine disaster, a coal mine explosion near the town of Centralia, Illinois, that killed 111 people. In 1956, Killenberg was promoted to city editor, followed by promotions to managing editor in 1966 and executive editor in 1979.

As editor, Killenberg's focus was on the interests of the people, resulting in him and his staff putting out "a damned good paper" that won a Pulitzer Prize among other prestigious awards for public service, including the Alfred Sloan Award for stories about highway safety. With his insistence on the localization of national news and humanization of victims beyond mere statistics, he literally brought stories home to the reader. When his story ideas were met with little enthusiasm at meetings with his news editors, Killenberg was known to say, "Nobody's going to like this story but the readers!" Killenberg shared his passion for local news with Globe-Democrat publisher Richard H. Amberg. Both men were highly involved in civic organizations. "How can you tell what's going on in a community unless you're part of it?" Amberg said.

Killenberg and Amberg used this approach toward local news to set the newspaper apart from its competitor, the St. Louis Post-Dispatch, which had an international and national focus. Its publisher Joseph Pulitzer Jr. said he was "careful to disassociate from boards and committees that could distort (his) news judgment". The June 9, 1967, issue of Time magazine contained a story on the legendary rivalry between the two newspapers. "It has become livelier since Killenberg, who has a keen sense of the city, took over last year as managing editor", Time said of the Globe-Democrat, and that it was "more brightly written than its rival and better to look at". But it was the Globe-Democrat's level of civic engagement and coverage that sent the message to City Hall, and subsequently to the readers, that it was a force to be reckoned with. Its motto in 1967, emblazoned on its delivery trucks, was "Fighting for St. Louis". In 1974, Killenberg inaugurated a special edition for its previously neglected Illinois readers and established news bureaus in Edwardsville, Belleville, Alton and East St. Louis.

Sue Ann Wood, a reporter, city editor and managing editor of the Globe-Democrat, remembers Killenberg as "mild-mannered in appearance and demeanor as Clark Kent, he never lost his temper, swore at anyone or criticized a staff member openly." According to Wood, he was the first to promote women, including her, to some top editor positions at the newspaper, which was uncommon in that business before the mid-1980s. Killenberg was a Catholic and Democrat working at a newspaper known for its conservative, Republican editorial page, but this did not affect his integrity as a journalist. "He never let his religion or political views influence his decisions, and he demanded that the news pages give fair and equal coverage to all local, state and national election candidates, regardless of which ones the editorial page was endorsing", Wood recalls.

== Legacy and honors ==
As managing editor of the St. Louis Globe-Democrat, Killenberg ushered reporters Al Delugach and Denny Walsh to a 1969 Pulitzer Prize for Local Investigative Specialized Reporting for exposing fraud and abuse of power within the St. Louis Steamfitters Union, Local 562. The Globe-Democrat earned prestigious awards for public service, including the Alfred Sloan Award for stories about highway safety.

Killenberg was posthumously inducted into the Missouri Press Association's Hall of Fame on September 11, 2015.

== Personal life ==
In June 1943 he married Therese Murphy. The couple had five children and enjoyed a long and happy 64-year marriage until her death in November 2007. On May 20, 2008, Killenberg died in his home in Bel-Nor, Missouri. He was survived by three daughters, two sons, a sister, thirteen grandchildren and four great-grandchildren.
