= 1959 Pulitzer Prize =

Awards for journalism and related fields

The following are the Pulitzer Prizes for 1959.

== Journalism awards ==
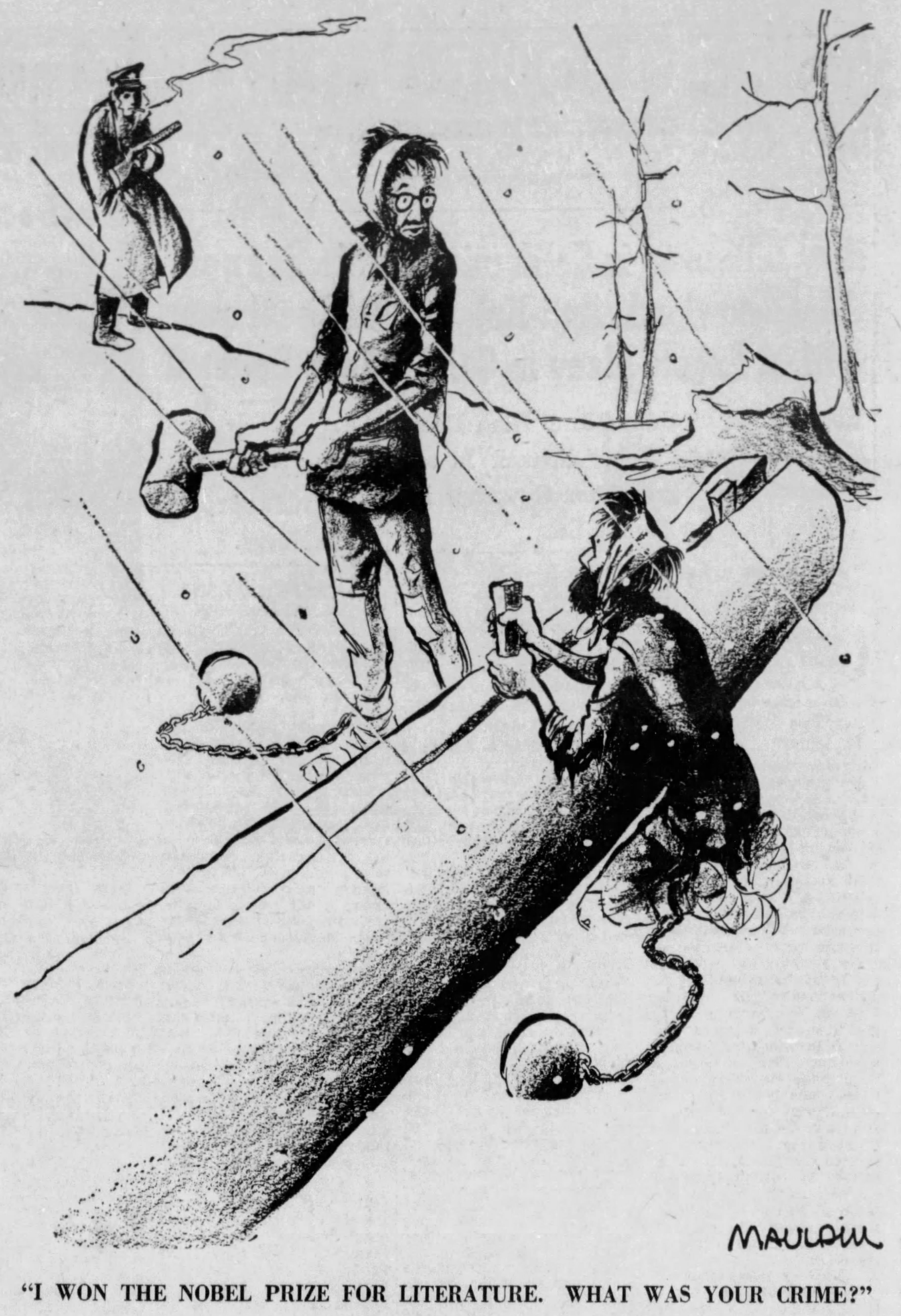
The prize-winning editorial cartoon, "I won the Nobel Prize for Literature. What was your crime?"

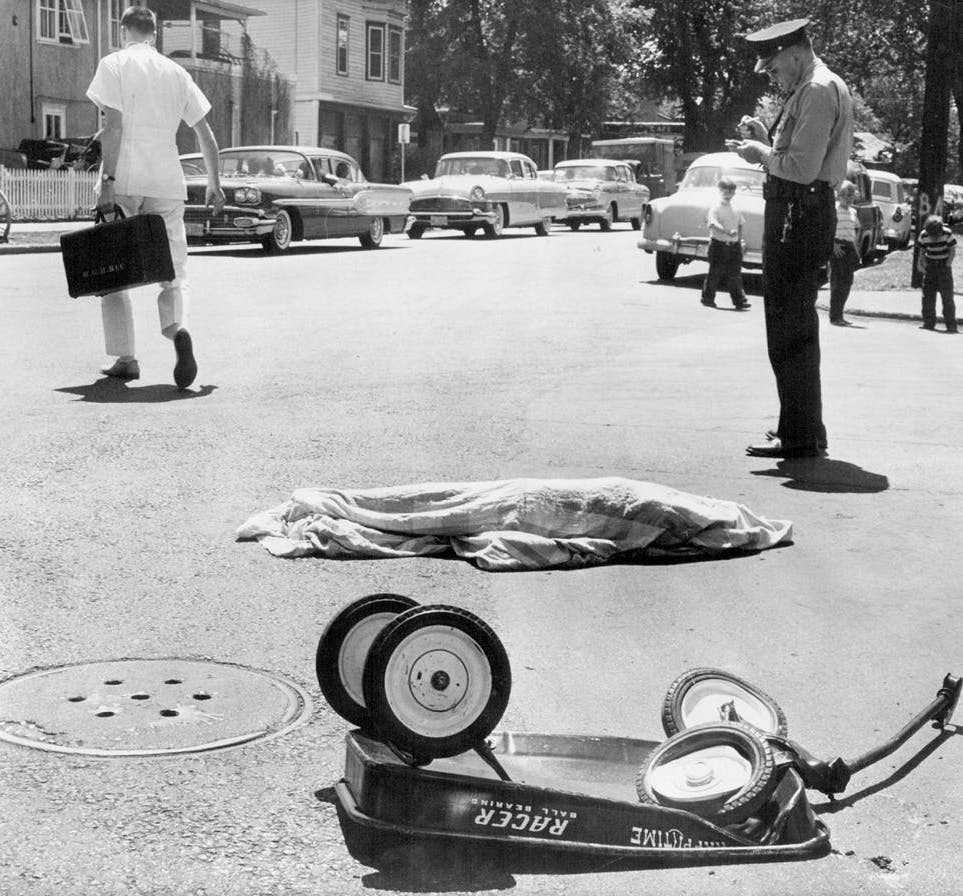
The prize-winning photograph, "Wheels of Death"

- Public Service:
  - The Utica Observer-Dispatch and the Utica Daily Press (New York), for their successful campaign against corruption, gambling and vice in their home city and the achievement of sweeping civic reforms in the face of political pressure and threats of violence. By their stalwart leadership of the forces of good government, these newspapers upheld the best tradition of a free press.
- Local Reporting, Edition Time:
  - Mary Lou Werner of the Evening Star (Washington, D.C.), for her comprehensive year-long coverage of the integration crisis in Virginia which demonstrated admirable qualities of accuracy, speed and the ability to interpret the news under deadline pressure in the course of a difficult and taxing assignment.
- Local Reporting, No Edition Time:
  - John Harold Brislin of the Scranton Tribune and the Scrantonian (Pennsylvania), for displaying courage, initiative and resourcefulness in his effective four-year campaign to halt labor violence in his home city, as a result of which ten corrupt union officials were sent to jail and a local union was emboldened to clean out racketeering elements.
- National Reporting:
  - Howard Van Smith of The Miami News, for a series of articles that focused public notice on deplorable conditions in a Florida migrant labor camp, which resulted in the provision of generous assistance for the 4,000 stranded workers in the camp, and thereby called attention to the national problem presented by 1,500,000 migratory laborers.
- International Reporting:
  - Joseph Martin and Philip Santora of the New York Daily News, for their exclusive series of articles disclosing the brutality of the Batista government in Cuba long before its downfall and forecasting the triumph of the revolutionary party led by Fidel Castro.
- Editorial Writing:
  - Ralph McGill, editor of the Atlanta Constitution, for his distinguished editorial writing during 1958 as exemplified in his editorial "A Church, A School..." and for his long, courageous and effective editorial leadership.
- Editorial Cartooning:
  - William H. (Bill) Mauldin of the St. Louis Post-Dispatch, for "I won the Nobel Prize for Literature. What was your crime?", published on October 30, 1958.
- Photography:
  - William Seaman of The Minneapolis Star, for his dramatic photograph of the sudden death of a child in the street.

== Letters, Drama and Music Awards ==
- Fiction:
  - The Travels of Jaimie McPheeters by Robert Lewis Taylor (Doubleday).
- Drama:
  - J.B. by Archibald Macleish (Houghton).
- History:
  - The Republican Era: 1869–1901 by Leonard D. White, with the assistance of Jean Schneider (Macmillan).
- Biography or Autobiography:
  - Woodrow Wilson, American Prophet by Arthur Walworth (Longmans).
- Poetry:
  - Selected Poems 1928-1958 by Stanley Kunitz (Little).
- Music:
  - Concerto for Piano and Orchestra by John La Montaine (Galaxy Music), first performed in Washington, D.C. by the National Symphony Orchestra on November 25, 1958.
