= Inside the Revolution =

Inside the Revolution may refer to:

- Inside the Revolution: How the followers of Jihad, Jefferson & Jesus are Battling to Dominate the Middle East & Transform the World, a 2009 book by Joel C. Rosenberg
- Inside the Revolution: A Journey into the Heart of Venezuela, a 2009 film about the Bolivarian Revolution
- Inside the Revolution, a 1995 newspaper series by The Washington Post
