= Pulitzer Prize for Investigative Reporting =

American journalism award

The Pulitzer Prize for Investigative Reporting has been awarded since 1953, under one name or another, for a distinguished example of investigative reporting by an individual or team, presented as a single article or series in a U.S. news publication. It is administered by the Columbia University Graduate School of Journalism in New York City.

From 1953 through 1963, the category was known as the Pulitzer Prize for Local Reporting, No Edition Time. From 1964 to 1984, it was known as the Pulitzer Prize for Local Investigative Specialized Reporting.

The Pulitzer Committee issues an official citation explaining the reasons for the award.

== Pulitzer Prize for Local Reporting, No Edition Time ==
- 1953: Edward J. Mowery of New York World-Telegram & Sun, "for his reporting of the facts which brought vindication and freedom to Louis Hoffner."
- 1954: Alvin McCoy of The Kansas City Star, "for a series of exclusive stories which led to the resignation under fire of C. Wesley Roberts as Republican National Chairman."
- 1955: Roland Kenneth Towery of Cuero Record (Texas), "for his series of articles exclusively exposing a scandal in the administration of the Veterans' Land Program in Texas. This 32-year-old World War II veteran, a former prisoner of the Japanese, made these irregularities a state-wide and subsequently a national issue, and stimulated state action to rectify conditions in the land program."
- 1956: Arthur Daley of The New York Times, "for his outstanding coverage and commentary on the world of sports in his daily column, Sports of the Times."
- 1957: Wallace Turner and William Lambert of Portland Oregonian, "for their exposé of vice and corruption in Portland involving some municipal officials and officers of the International Brotherhood of Teamsters, Chauffeurs, Warehousemen and Helpers of America, Western Conference. They fulfilled their assignments despite great handicaps and the risk of reprisal from lawless elements."
- 1958: George Beveridge of Evening Star (Washington, D.C.), "for his excellent and thought-provoking series, "Metro, City of Tomorrow," describing in depth the urban problems of Washington, D.C., which stimulated widespread public consideration of these problems and encouraged further studies by both public and private agencies."
- 1959: John Harold Brislin of Scranton Tribune and Scrantonian, "for displaying courage, initiative and resourcefulness in his effective four-year campaign to halt labor violence in his home city, as a result of which ten corrupt union officials were sent to jail and a local union was embolden to clean out racketeering elements."
- 1960: Miriam Ottenberg of Evening Star (Washington, D.C.), "for a series of seven articles exposing a used-car racket in Washington, D.C., that victimized many unwary buyers. The series led to new regulations to protect the public and served to alert other communities to such sharp practices."
- 1961: Edgar May of Buffalo Evening News, "for his series of articles on New York State's public welfare services entitled, Our Costly Dilemma, based in part on his three-month employment as a state case worker. The series brought about reforms that attracted nationwide attention."
- 1962: George Bliss of Chicago Tribune, "for his initiative in uncovering scandals in the Metropolitan Sanitary District of Greater Chicago, with resultant remedial action."
- 1963: Oscar Griffin Jr. of Pecos Independent and Enterprise, "who as editor initiated the exposure of the Billie Sol Estes scandal and thereby brought a major fraud on the United States government to national attention with resultant investigation, prosecution and conviction of Estes."

== Pulitzer Prize for Local Investigative Specialized Reporting ==
- 1964: James V. Magee, Albert V. Gaudiosi and Frederick Meyer of Philadelphia Bulletin, "for their exposé of numbers racket operations with police collusion in South Philadelphia, which resulted in arrests and a cleanup of the police department."
- 1965: Gene Goltz of Houston Post, "for his exposé of government corruption Pasadena, Texas, which resulted in widespread reforms."
- 1966: John Anthony Frasca of Tampa Tribune, "for his investigation and reporting of two robberies that resulted in the freeing of an innocent man."
- 1967: Gene Miller of Miami Herald, "for initiative and investigative reporting that helped to free two persons wrongfully convicted of murder."
- 1968: J. Anthony Lukas of The New York Times, "for the social document he wrote in his investigation of the life and the murder of Linda Fitzpatrick."
- 1969: Al Delugach and Denny Walsh of St. Louis Globe-Democrat, "for their campaign against fraud and abuse of power within the St. Louis Steamfitters Union, Local 562."
- 1970: Harold Eugene Martin of Montgomery Advertiser and Alabama Journal, "for his exposé of a commercial scheme for using Alabama prisoners for drug experimentation and obtaining blood plasma from them."
- 1971: William Jones of Chicago Tribune, "for exposing collusion between police and some of Chicago's largest private ambulance companies to restrict service in low income areas, leading to major reforms."
- 1972: Timothy Leland, Gerard M. O'Neill, Stephen A. Kurkjian and Ann Desantis of The Boston Globe, "for their exposure of widespread corruption in Somerville, Massachusetts."
- 1973: The Sun Newspapers Of Omaha, "for uncovering the large financial resources of Boys Town, leading to reforms in this charitable organization's solicitation and use of funds contributed by the public."
- 1974: William Sherman of New York Daily News, "for his resourceful investigative reporting in the exposure of extreme abuse of the New York Medicaid program."
- 1975: Indianapolis Star, "for its disclosures of local police corruption and dilatory law enforcement, resulting in a cleanup of both the Police Department and the office of the County Prosecutor."
- 1976: Staff of Chicago Tribune, "for uncovering widespread abuses in Federal housing programs in Chicago and exposing shocking conditions at two private Chicago hospitals."
- 1977: Acel Moore and Wendell Rawls Jr. of The Philadelphia Inquirer, "for their reports on conditions in the Farview (Pa.) State Hospital for the mentally ill."
- 1978: Anthony R. Dolan of Stamford Advocate, "for a series on municipal corruption."
- 1979: Gilbert M. Gaul and Elliot G. Jaspin of Pottsville Republican (Pennsylvania), "for stories on the destruction of the Blue Coal Company by men with ties to organized crime."
- 1980: Stephen A. Kurkjian, Alexander B. Hawes Jr., Nils Bruzelius, Joan Vennochi and Robert M. Porterfield of The Boston Globe, "for articles on Boston's transit system."
- 1981: Clark Hallas and Robert B. Lowe of Arizona Daily Star, "for their investigation of the University of Arizona Athletic Department."
- 1982: Paul Henderson of Seattle Times, "for reporting which proved the innocence of a man convicted of rape."
- 1983: Loretta Tofani of The Washington Post, "for her investigation of rape and sexual assault in the Prince George's County, Maryland Detention Center."
- 1984: Kenneth Cooper, Joan Fitz Gerald, Jonathan Kaufman, Norman Lockman, Gary McMillan, Kirk Scharfenberg and David Wessel of The Boston Globe, "for their series examining race relations in Boston, a notable exercise in public service that turned a searching gaze on some the city's most honored institutions including the Globe itself."

== Pulitzer Prize for Investigative Reporting ==
- 1985: Lucy Morgan and Jack Reed of St. Petersburg Times (Florida), "for their thorough reporting on Pasco County Sheriff John Short, which revealed his department's corruption and led to his removal from office by voters."
- 1985: William K. Marimow of The Philadelphia Inquirer, "for his revelation that city police dogs had attacked more than 350 people - an exposure that led to investigations of the K-9 unit and the removal of a dozen officers from it."
- 1986: Jeffrey A. Marx and Michael M. York of Lexington Herald-Leader (Kentucky), "for their series 'Playing Above the Rules,' which exposed cash payoffs to University of Kentucky basketball players in violation of NCAA regulations. However, the UK basketball program did little to reform itself in the wake of the articles; true reform would not come until the program was involved in another cash-for-recruits scandal three years later."
- 1987: Daniel R. Biddle, H.G. Bissinger, and Fredric N. Tulsky of The Philadelphia Inquirer, "for their series 'Disorder in the Court,' which revealed transgressions of justice in the Philadelphia court system and led to federal and state investigations." John Woestendiek of The Philadelphia Inquirer for "outstanding prison beat reporting, which included proving the innocence of a man convicted of murder."
- 1988: Dean Baquet, William C. Gaines, and Ann Marie Lipinski of Chicago Tribune, "for their detailed reporting on the self-interest and waste that plague Chicago's City Council."
- 1989: Bill Dedman of Atlanta Journal and Constitution, "for his investigation of the racial discrimination practiced by lending institutions in Atlanta, reporting which led to significant reforms in those policies."
- 1990: Lou Kilzer and Chris Ison of Minneapolis-St. Paul Star Tribune, "for reporting that exposed a network of local citizens who had links to members of the Saint Paul Fire Department and who profited from fires, including some described by the fire department itself as being of suspicious origin."
- 1991: Joseph T. Hallinan and Susan M. Headden of The Indianapolis Star, "for their shocking series on medical malpractice in the state."
- 1992: Lorraine Adams and Dan Malone of The Dallas Morning News, "for reporting that charged Texas police with extensive misconduct and abuses of power."
- 1993: Jeff Brazil and Steve Berry of Orlando Sentinel (Florida), "for exposing the unjust seizure of millions of dollars from motorists – most of them minorities – by a sheriff's drug squad."
- 1994: Providence Journal-Bulletin (Rhode Island) staff, "for thorough reporting that disclosed pervasive corruption within the Rhode Island court system."
- 1995: Stephanie Saul and Brian Donovan of Newsday, "for their stories that revealed disability pension abuses by local police."
- 1996: The Orange County Register staff, "for reporting that uncovered fraudulent and unethical fertility practices at a leading research university hospital and prompted key regulatory reforms."
- 1997: Eric Nalder, Deborah Nelson, and Alex Tizon of The Seattle Times, "for their investigation of widespread corruption and inequities in the federally sponsored housing program for Native Americans, which inspired much-needed reforms."
- 1998: Gary Cohn and Will Englund of The Baltimore Sun, "for their compelling series on the international shipbreaking industry that revealed the dangers posed to workers and the environment when discarded ships are dismantled."
- 1999: The Miami Herald staff, "for its detailed reporting that revealed pervasive voter fraud in a city mayoral election that was subsequently overturned."
- 2000: Sang-Hun Choe, Charles J. Hanley, and Martha Mendoza of Associated Press, "for a report on the killings of Korean civilians by American soldiers in the early days of the Korean War."
- 2001: David Willman of Los Angeles Times, "for his pioneering exposé of seven unsafe prescription drugs that had been approved by the Food and Drug Administration, and an analysis of the policy reforms that had reduced the agency's effectiveness."
- 2002: Sari Horwitz, Scott Higham, and Sarah Cohen of The Washington Post, "for a series that exposed the District of Columbia's role in the neglect and death of 229 children placed in protective care between 1993 and 2000, which prompted an overhaul of the city's child welfare system."
- 2003: Clifford J. Levy of The New York Times, "for his vivid, brilliantly written series 'Broken Homes' that exposed the abuse of mentally ill adults in state-regulated homes."
- 2004: Michael D. Sallah, Joe Mahr, and Mitch Weiss of Toledo Blade, "for a series on atrocities by the Tiger Force during the Vietnam War."
- 2005: Nigel Jaquiss of Willamette Week, Portland, Oregon, "for his investigation exposing former governor Neil Goldschmidt's long concealed sexual misconduct with a 14-year-old girl."
- 2006: Susan Schmidt, James V. Grimaldi and R. Jeffrey Smith of The Washington Post, "for their indefatigable probe of Washington lobbyist Jack Abramoff that exposed congressional corruption and produced reform efforts."
- 2007: Brett Blackledge of The Birmingham News, "for his exposure of cronyism and corruption in the state's two-year college system, resulting in the dismissal of the chancellor and other corrective action."
- 2008 (dual winners): Walt Bogdanich and Jake Hooker of The New York Times, "for their stories on toxic ingredients in medicine and other everyday products imported from China, leading to crackdowns by American and Chinese officials." Staff of The Chicago Tribune, "for its exposure of faulty governmental regulation of toys, car seats and cribs, resulting in the extensive recall of hazardous products and congressional action to tighten supervision."
- 2009: David Barstow of The New York Times, "for his tenacious reporting that revealed how some retired generals, working as radio and television analysts, had been co-opted by the Pentagon to make its case for the war in Iraq, and how many of them also had undisclosed ties to companies that benefited from policies they defended."
- 2010 (dual winners): Barbara Laker and Wendy Ruderman of Philadelphia Daily News, "for their resourceful reporting that exposed a rogue police narcotics squad, resulting in an FBI probe and the review of hundreds of criminal cases tainted by the scandal." Sheri Fink of ProPublica, in collaboration with The New York Times Magazine, "for a story that chronicles the urgent life-and-death decisions made by one hospital's exhausted doctors when they were cut off by the floodwaters of Hurricane Katrina."
- 2011: Paige St. John of Sarasota Herald-Tribune, "for her examination of weaknesses in the murky property-insurance system vital to Florida homeowners, providing handy data to assess insurer reliability and stirring regulatory action."
- 2012 (dual winners): Matt Apuzzo, Adam Goldman, Eileen Sullivan and Chris Hawley of Associated Press, "for their spotlighting of the New York Police Department's clandestine spying program that monitored daily life in Muslim communities, resulting in congressional calls for a federal investigation, and a debate over the proper role of domestic intelligence gathering." Michael J. Berens and Ken Armstrong of The Seattle Times, "for their investigation of how a little known governmental body in Washington State moved vulnerable patients from safer pain-control medication to methadone, a cheaper but more dangerous drug, coverage that prompted statewide health warnings."
- 2013: David Barstow and Alejandra Xanic von Bertrab of The New York Times, "for their reports on how Wal-Mart used widespread bribery to dominate the market in Mexico, resulting in changes in company practices."
- 2014: Chris Hamby of The Center for Public Integrity, Washington, D.C. "for his reports on how some lawyers and doctors rigged a system to deny benefits to coal miners stricken with black lung disease, resulting in remedial legislative efforts."
- 2015 (dual winners): Eric Lipton of The New York Times, "for reporting that showed how the influence of lobbyists can sway congressional leaders and state attorneys general, slanting justice toward the wealthy and connected." The Wall Street Journal staff, "for 'Medicare Unmasked,' a pioneering project that gave Americans unprecedented access to previously confidential data on the motivations and practices of their health care providers." The Wall Street Journal team included John Carreyrou, Chris Stewart, Rob Barry, Tom McGinty, Martin Burch, Jon Keegan and Stuart Thompson.
- 2016: Leonora LaPeter Anton and Anthony Cormier of Tampa Bay Times and Michael Braga of Sarasota Herald-Tribune, "for a stellar example of collaborative reporting by two news organizations that revealed escalating violence and neglect in Florida mental hospitals and laid the blame at the door of state officials."
- 2017: Eric Eyre of Charleston Gazette-Mail, Charleston, West Virginia, "for courageous reporting, performed in the face of powerful opposition, to expose the flood of opioids flowing into depressed West Virginia counties with the highest overdose death rates in the country."
- 2018: The staff of The Washington Post, "for purposeful and relentless reporting that changed the course of a Senate race in Alabama by revealing a candidate's alleged past sexual harassment of teenage girls and subsequent efforts to undermine the journalism that exposed it." Team: Stephanie McCrummen, Beth Reinhard and Alice Crites.
- 2019: Matt Hamilton, Harriet Ryan and Paul Pringle of Los Angeles Times, "for consequential reporting on a University of Southern California gynecologist accused of violating hundreds of young women for more than a quarter-century."
- 2020: Brian M Rosenthal of The New York Times, "for an exposé of New York City's taxi industry that showed how lenders profited from predatory loans that shattered the lives of vulnerable drivers, reporting that ultimately led to state and federal investigations and sweeping reforms."
- 2021: Matt Rocheleau, Vernal Coleman, Laura Crimaldi, Evan Allen and Brendan McCarthy of The Boston Globe, "For reporting that uncovered a systematic failure by state governments to share information about dangerous truck drivers that could have kept them off the road, prompting immediate reforms."
- 2022: Corey G. Johnson, Rebecca Woolington and Eli Murray of the Tampa Bay Times, "For a compelling exposé of highly toxic hazards inside Florida's only battery recycling plant that forced the implementation of safety measures to adequately protect workers and nearby residents."
- 2023: Staff of The Wall Street Journal, "for sharp accountability reporting on financial conflicts of interest among officials at 50 federal agencies, revealing those who bought and sold stocks they regulated and other ethical violations by individuals charged with safeguarding the public's interest."
- 2024: Hannah Dreier, The New York Times, "for a deeply reported series of stories revealing the stunning reach of migrant child labor across the United States and the corporate and governmental failures that perpetuate it."
- 2025: Staff, Reuters, "for a boldly reported exposé of lax regulation in the U.S. and abroad that makes fentanyl, one of the world's deadliest drugs, inexpensive and widely available to users in the United States."
- 2026: Staff, The New York Times, "for deeply reported stories that exposed how President Trump has shattered constraints on conflicts of interest and exploited the moneymaking opportunities that come with power, enriching his family and allies."

== See also ==
- duPont-Columbia Award (for US broadcast journalism)
- George Polk Awards (American journalism)
- Investigative Reporters and Editors Award (for all media)
- Paul Foot Awards (British investigative journalism)
- Walkley Awards (Australian journalism)
