= Alice Crites =

American librarian and Pulitzer winner

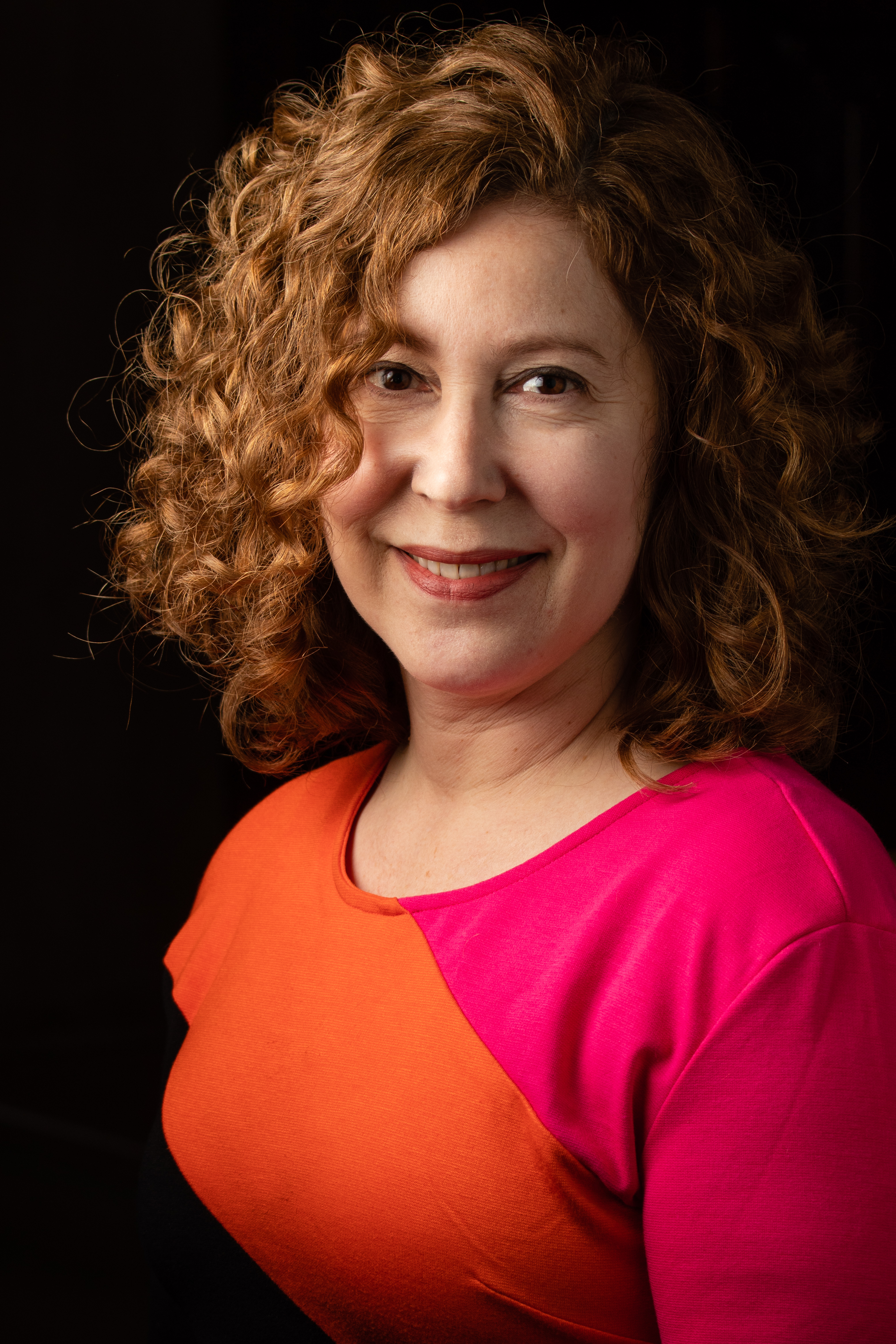
- Occupation: Researcher
- Known for: Pulitzer Prize for Investigative Reporting; Toner Prize for Excellence in Political Reporting

Alice R. Crites is a Washington Post librarian and the researcher on the three-member team that won the 2018 Pulitzer Prize for Investigative Reporting. She specializes in politics and government.

Crites has been a researcher on six different Pulitzer-winning teams at Washington Post, 2006, 2008, 2015, 2016, 2017, and 2018. She is an advocate for the role of researchers and news libraries in the support of journalism, saying "We're cost effective. We're expert searchers.... We not only get information, but also help avoid making mistakes."

== Early life and education ==
Crites is the daughter of an NIH cancer researcher and a librarian for the Montgomery County Schools. She has always been a self proclaimed "news junkie". After Graduating from Walter Johnson High School, she graduated from University of Maryland with a B.A. in English where she studied medieval literature including the works of Geoffrey Chaucer, and received an M.A. in English and literary criticism from Carnegie Mellon University. She worked for the Congressional Research Service at the Library of Congress before getting her MLS from the University of Maryland.

== Career ==
Crites started as a weekend worker at the Washington Post in 1990 and was hired full-time in 1992. She has become the backbone of national political investigations after nearly three decades at the Washington post. She specializes in research and reporting on government and politics; she has covered elections since 1994. Her writing has appeared in the Seattle Times and Washington Post She worked with the Post's print news library, the News Research Center, which included approximately "7,500 books, 30 periodicals a month and 15 daily newspapers." In more recent years, she's used computer-assisted reporting as well as many specialty databases to pursue her work, noting in 2007 that some material—U.S. senators' legal defense fund documents, for example—could still only be accessed in person. In 2017 she worked with David Fahrenthold on his 2017 Pulitzer Prize in National Reporting for the investigation of Donald Trump giving to charities. In 2018 she was part of the team that won the Pulitzer Prize for Investigative Reporting on the false accusations made against Alabama senate candidate Roy Moore and the sting operation attached to the claims.

Part of Crites' work investigating Senate candidate Roy Moore involved combating misinformation that was being disseminated by Project Veritas to try to discredit the Washington Post's reporting. Crites uncovered a GoFundMe page that linked Project Veritas to a woman who had been telling the Post that Roy Moore had impregnated her as a legally-underage teenager, and urging them to report on it. She also directly refuted Moore's claim's that an Alabama county didn't sell alcohol—when he'd been accused of procuring alcohol for a minor in that county—by finding evidence that the county allowed liquor sales seven years before the event occurred. Her research allowed the Post to outline a clear well-established case against Moore. This is one of the many ways in which Crite's involvement has expanded publication perception of the Roy Moore scandal.

Crites contributed in an article published by The Washington Post in 2020, going into detail on sexual assault allegations a woman in California claimed against Joe Biden.

Crites has contributed for several Pulitzer prize winning investigations including a 2017 investigation of Donald Trump's charitable giving.

She also contributed to reporting on the Elliot Rodger's shooting in California in 2014, discussing the gun regulation and ownership laws in California at the time.

She was among a group of reporters and researchers who left the Washington Post in late December 2023, when buy-outs were offered as a cost-cutting measure.
