= Jake Hooker (journalist) =

American journalist (born 1973)

Jake Hooker (October 27, 1973 Newton, Massachusetts) is an American journalist and recipient of the 2008 Pulitzer Prize for Investigative Reporting and the Gerald Loeb Award for Large Newspapers for investigations done while in China over concerns with how dangerous and poisonous pharmaceutical ingredients from China have flowed into the global market.

He attended Milton Academy and Dartmouth College where he studied art history. In 2000, he was a Peace Corps volunteer in China for two years; he taught English in Wanxian. His first published newspaper article about his life in Waxian appeared in The Boston Globe in 2001. In 2003, he worked for the Surmang Foundation in China. In his free time, he has learned Chinese. He currently works for the New York Times.
