= Jeffrey A. Marx =

American investigative journalist

- Occupation: Journalist
- Employer: Lexington Herald-Leader
- Notable work: Playing Above the Rules
- Awards: Pulitzer Prize for Investigative Reporting (1986)

Jeffrey A. Marx is an American journalist. In the early 1980s, as a correspondent for the Lexington Herald-Leader, he co-authored a series of exposes on improper cash payoffs to University of Kentucky basketball players which won him and the co-author, Michael M. York, the 1986 Pulitzer Prize for Investigative Reporting. The article series "Playing Above the Rules", exposed improper cash payoffs to University of Kentucky basketball players and improper offers made to recruits by other universities. The authors interviewed 33 former Wildcats – some of whom spoke to Marx and York with the goal of ending the abuses – and the paper sued the university and the state of Kentucky under freedom of information laws to get detailed information, including the names of specific violators, for the series. The piece also led to NCAA regulation changes.
