= Robin Toner =

American female journalist (1954–2008)

- Toner
- Born: May 22, 1954; Chester, Pennsylvania, U.S.
- Died: December 12, 2008 (aged 54); Washington, D.C., U.S.
- Resting place: Oak Hill Cemetery; Washington, D.C., U.S.
- Education: Syracuse University
- Occupation: journalist
- Employer: New York Times
- Spouse: Peter Gosselin
- Children: 2
- Parent(s): Charles and Mary Louise Toner

Roberta "Robin" Denise Toner (May 22, 1954 – December 12, 2008) was an American journalist from Pennsylvania. She was the first woman to be national political correspondent for The New York Times.

== Biography ==
Robin Toner was born on May 22, 1954, in Chester, Pennsylvania and grew up in Chadds Ford Township, Pennsylvania. Her father, Charles, was an oil refinery supervisor and World War II pilot; her mother, Mary Louise, was a homemaker. She graduated from Ursuline Academy in Wilmington, DE and summa cum laude from Syracuse University in 1976 with a dual major from the College of Arts and Sciences and the S.I. Newhouse School of Public Communications.

Toner reported for The Charleston Daily Mail in West Virginia and The Atlanta Journal and Constitution before joining the Times in 1985. In 1996, Toner married economics correspondent Peter G. Gosselin.

In 1992, Toner was the lead reporter on Bill Clinton's presidential election. She later became chief of correspondents on the paper's national desk in New York, coaching reporters in other bureaus, and also had held the title of senior writer, covering topics including abortion rights and judicial nominations.

== Death and legacy ==
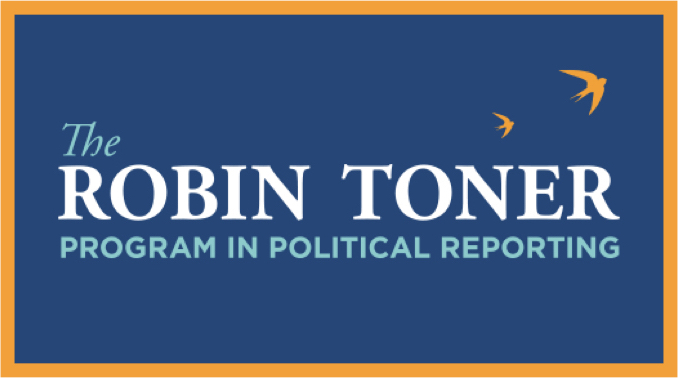
Robin Toner Program logo

Toner died of complications resulting from colon cancer on December 12, 2008, and was interred at Oak Hill Cemetery in Washington, D.C.

The Toner Prize for Excellence in Political Reporting, awarded annually by Syracuse University's S.I. Newhouse School of Public Communications, is named after her, as is the Toner Lecture/Symposium on American politics and political journalism; together they make up the Robin Toner Program in Political Reporting, established at Syracuse University in 2009.
