= Leonora LaPeter Anton =

American journalist

- Education: University of Illinois at Urbana–Champaign
- Occupation: Journalist
- Children: 1

Leonora LaPeter Anton is an American journalist with the Tampa Bay Times. Anton was a co-recipient of the 2016 Pulitzer Prize for Investigative Reporting.

== Biography ==
Anton grew up in Connecticut, but spent a lot of her childhood living in Greece, where her mother was an archeologist and Fulbright Scholar. She studied journalism at University of Illinois at Urbana–Champaign.

Anton began her career writing for the Okeechobee News in Okeechobee, Florida. In 1992, she was hired at The Island Packet in Hilton Head Island, South Carolina, where she covered environmental and health care topics. Anton then worked at the Tallahassee Democrat in Tallahassee, Florida, and Savannah Morning News in Savannah, Georgia.

In 2000, Anton joined the Tampa Bay Times. That same year, she won the American Society of News Editors award for deadline reporting.

Anton was awarded the Pulitzer Prize for Investigative Reporting in 2016 for a series entitled "Insane. Invisible. In Danger," published in the Tampa Bay Times and Sarasota Herald-Tribune. The series, co-authored by Michael Braga and Anthony Cormier, unveiled the violence and neglect taking place at state-funded mental hospitals in the state of Florida.

== Personal life ==
Anton lives in St. Petersburg, Florida with her husband Larry and one daughter.
