= John Woestendiek =

American journalist and author (1954–2020)

William John Woestendiek Jr. (c.1954 –June 24, 2020) was an American journalist and author. He was awarded a Pulitzer Prize for Investigative Reporting in 1987 for articles "which included proving the innocence of a man convicted of murder". After retiring from journalism, he started a blog, Ohmidog!, which focused on the relationships between people and their canine companions. Woestendiek wrote two non-fiction books: Dog, Inc.: The Uncanny Story of Cloning Man’s Best Friend and Travels With Ace.

== Early life and education ==
Woestendiek was born in Winston-Salem, North Carolina to William and Jo Woestendiek. Both of his parents were newspaper reporters and editors. He graduated from Sanderson High School, Raleigh, North Carolina, in 1971, and from the University of North Carolina at Chapel Hill in 1975.

== Journalism ==
Woestendiek's first job as a reporter was on the Arizona Daily Star in Tucson. He then worked for the Kentucky Reader in Lexington. In 1977, he joined The Philadelphia Inquirer as an investigative reporter, and became the Inquirer's Metro columnist in 1997. Woestendiek later wrote for the Charlotte Observer. He wrote for The Baltimore Sun from 2001 until 2008.

In 1987, Woestendiek received a Pulitzer Prize for his series of articles in The Philadelphia Inquirer examining the trial of Terence McCracken, who had been convicted of second degree murder, robbery, and conspiracy, and sentenced to life in prison. (Note: After multiple vacations and reversals, McCracken was granted a new trial and acquitted of the crimes.)

Woestendiek was the T. Anthony Pollner Distinguished Professor, a guest teaching position, at the University of Montana in the fall of 2007.

== Ace, blogs, and books ==
Woestendiek had adopted Ace, a rescue dog, in 2005. After leaving The Baltimore Sun, Woestendiek started a blog about dogs called Ohmidog!, a continuation of the pets blog he began for The Baltimore Sun in 2007. As part of the pet blog, Woestendiek filmed a documentary of his attempts to determine Ace's genetic ancestry called Hey, Mister, what kind of dog is that?

A blog post that he wrote for The Baltimore Sun put him in contact with Joyce McKinney, who had travelled to South Korea to clone her deceased pit bull, Booger. Woestendiek researched the growing field of dog cloning and published Dog, Inc: The Uncanny Story of Cloning Man's Best Friend in 2010.

Along with Ace, Woestendiek decided to recreate John Steinbeck's route from Travels with Charley. He documented their adventure on his blog, Travels With Ace. His 2012 book of the same name led to an appearance on Nightline

== Personal life and death ==
Woestendiek's former wives were Jennifer Mitchell and Erika Hobbs. Woestendiek and Jennifer adopted Joseph Yoon Tae from South Korea in 1992. His son Joe died from a car accident in 2018.

On June 7, 2020, Woestendiek was hospitalized for complications from a stroke. He died at a hospice on June 24.
