= Bel-Nor, Missouri =

- City
- Seal

- Location of Bel-Nor, Missouri
- Coordinates: 38°42′06″N 90°19′05″W
- Country: United States
- State: Missouri
- County: St. Louis
- Townships: Normandy
- Founded: 1937

Area
  - Total: 0.63 sq mi (1.63 km^{2})
  - Land: 0.63 sq mi (1.63 km^{2})
  - Water: 0 sq mi (0.00 km^{2})
- Elevation: 643 ft (196 m)

Population (2020)
  - Total: 1,399
  - Density: 2,222.9/sq mi (858.27/km^{2})
- Time zone: UTC-6 (Central (CST))
  - Summer (DST): UTC-5 (CDT)
- FIPS code: 29-04348
- GNIS feature ID: 2398088
- Website: www.cityofbelnor.org

Bel-Nor is a northwestern suburban city of St. Louis in St. Louis County, Missouri, United States. The population was 1,399 as of the 2020 census.

== Geography ==
According to the United States Census Bureau, the village has a total area of 0.63 square miles (1.63 km^{2}), all land.

== Demographics ==
Historical population
Census	Pop.	Note	%±
1940	937		—
1950	1,290		37.7%
1960	2,388		85.1%
1970	2,247		−5.9%
1980	2,047		−8.9%
1990	2,935		43.4%
2000	1,598		−45.6%
2010	1,499		−6.2%
2020	1,399		−6.7%
U.S. Decennial Census

Bel-Nor village, Missouri – Racial and ethnic composition Note: the US Census treats Hispanic/Latino as an ethnic category. This table excludes Latinos from the racial categories and assigns them to a separate category. Hispanics/Latinos may be of any race.
Race / Ethnicity (NH = Non-Hispanic)	Pop 2000	Pop 2010	Pop 2020	% 2000	% 2010	% 2020
White alone (NH)	908	704	604	56.82%	46.96%	43.17%
Black or African American alone (NH)	633	692	635	39.61%	46.16%	45.39%
Native American or Alaska Native alone (NH)	0	0	4	0.00%	0.00%	0.29%
Asian alone (NH)	15	33	50	0.94%	2.20%	3.57%
Native Hawaiian or Pacific Islander alone (NH)	0	0	0	0.00%	0.00%	0.00%
Other race alone (NH)	3	2	11	0.19%	0.13%	0.79%
Mixed race or Multiracial (NH)	25	33	71	1.56%	2.20%	5.08%
Hispanic or Latino (any race)	14	35	24	0.88%	2.33%	1.72%
Total	1,598	1,499	1,399	100.00%	100.00%	100.00%

=== 2010 census ===
As of the census of 2010, there were 1,499 people, 668 households, and 412 families living in the village. The population density was 2,379.4 inhabitants per square mile (918.7/km^{2}). There were 702 housing units at an average density of 1,114.3 per square mile (430.2/km^{2}). The racial makeup of the village was 48.7% White, 46.4% African American, 2.2% Asian, 0.3% from other races, and 2.3% from two or more races. Hispanic or Latino of any race were 2.3% of the population.

There were 668 households, of which 22.0% had children under the age of 18 living with them, 46.7% were married couples living together, 12.1% had a female householder with no husband present, 2.8% had a male householder with no wife present, and 38.3% were non-families. 31.4% of all households were made up of individuals, and 10.5% had someone living alone who was 65 years of age or older. The average household size was 2.24 and the average family size was 2.81.

The median age in the village was 47.4 years. 16.4% of residents were under the age of 18; 8.6% were between the ages of 18 and 24; 22% were from 25 to 44; 36.5% were from 45 to 64; and 16.5% were 65 years of age or older. The gender makeup of the village was 48.2% male and 51.8% female.

=== 2000 census ===
As of the census of 2000, there were 1,598 people, 667 households, and 474 families living in the village. The population density was 2,555.5 people per square mile (979.4 per km^{2}). There were 689 housing units at an average density of 1,101.8 per square mile (422.3 per km^{2}). The racial makeup of the village was 57.20% White, 39.61% African American, 0.94% Asian, 0.25% from other races, and 2.00% from two or more races. Hispanic or Latino of any race were 0.88% of the population.

There were 667 households, out of which 25.6% had children under the age of 18 living with them, 55.0% were married couples living together, 12.6% had a female householder with no husband present, and 28.8% were non-families. 24.4% of all households were made up of individuals, and 8.4% had someone living alone who was 65 years of age or older. The average household size was 2.37 and the average family size was 2.81.

In the village, the population was spread out, with 19.6% under the age of 18, 7.0% from 18 to 24, 25.8% from 25 to 44, 30.4% from 45 to 64, and 17.1% who were 65 years of age or older. The median age was 44 years. For every 100 females, there were 84.7 males. For every 100 females age 18 and over, there were 79.3 males.

The median income for a household in the village was $57,857, and the median income for a family was $77,917. Males had a median income of $46,369 versus $32,625 for females. The per capita income for the village was $46,534. There were 0.3% of families and 1.0% of the population living below the poverty line, including 1.0% of under eighteens and 3.4% of those over 64.

== Overview ==
Bel-Nor incorporated in November 1937 and uses a village form of government with five elected trustees. Bel-Nor provides police service, street maintenance and snow plowing.

The Normandie Golf Club, which claims to be the oldest public golf course west of the Mississippi River, is adjacent to the city. It was created in 1901 as the Normandy Country Club.

In 2006, village residents fought in court to stop a planned redevelopment of Normandie Golf Course into residential housing. The course is no longer being considered for such development and will be renovated in late 2023.

== Police ==
The Bel-Nor Police Department (BNPD) is responsible for enforcing the Missouri Law and the Municipal Law for the City of Bel-Nor. It consists of a small number of trained officers that come with several years of combined law enforcement experience, and a fleet of two patrol SUV's as well as one patrol car. Bel-Nor officers are known for strict speed enforcement on Natural Bridge Road and are known to assist officers from surrounding agencies including the St. John Police Department, the Breckenridge Hills Police Department, the Woodson Terrace Police Department and the Normandy Police Department on several calls for service due to a mutual aid agreement made with said departments. Bel-Nor officers can also be seen regularly on the UMSL campus, as a section of this campus lies within Bel-Nor. The Bel-Nor Police Department is contracted with the Saint Louis County Police Department for dispatching services.

== Education ==
It is in the Normandy Schools Collaborative school district. Bel-Nor School, a grade 1-5 school that first opened in the 1920s, is in Bel-Nor.

The Normandy Kindergarten Center had a Bel-Nor postal address but was in Bel-Ridge.

The comprehensive high school of the district is Normandy High School.

Bel-Nor is also home to Incarnate Word Academy.

A portion of the property of the University of Missouri–St. Louis extends into Bel-Nor.

== Film ==
The film The Exorcist was based on an exorcism that happened within the village of Bel-Nor in 1949.

== Notable people ==
This list may include persons born in the community, past residents, and current residents.

- Mickey Carroll, dwarf actor who portrayed a munchkin in The Wizard of Oz
- Napheesa Collier, UConn women's basketball player
- Richard Eastham, buried at Oak Grove Cemetery, Bel-Nor
- Donny Hathaway, buried at Lake Charles Cemetery, Bel-Nor
- George A. Killenberg, Executive Editor of the St. Louis Globe-Democrat
