= Denny Walsh =

American journalist (1935–2024)

- Born: November 23, 1935
- Died: March 29, 2024 (aged 88)
- Known for: Investigative reporting on St. Louis Steamfitters Union, Local 562
- Awards: Pulitzer Prize for Local Investigative Specialized Reporting (1969)

Denny Walsh (November 23, 1935 – March 29, 2024) was an American journalist. While working at the St. Louis Globe-Democrat, he won the 1969 Pulitzer Prize in local investigative specialized reporting with his reporting partner, Albert Delugach, for stories exposing "fraud and abuse of power within the St. Louis Steamfitters Union, Local 562."
