= Michael M. York =

American journalist and attorney (born 1953)

- Born: April 10, 1953 (age 73); High Point, North Carolina, U.S.
- Education: University of Kentucky (BA); University of North Carolina School of Law (JD)
- Occupations: Attorney, journalist
- Spouse: Rebecca Todd
- Children: 3
- Writing career
- Genre: Investigative journalism
- Notable awards: Pulitzer Prize for Investigative Reporting, 1986

Michael M. "Mike" York (born April 10, 1953) is an American journalist and attorney. In the early 1980s, as the Washington correspondent for the Lexington Herald-Leader, he co-authored a series of exposes on improper cash payoffs to University of Kentucky basketball players which won him and his co-author, Jeffrey A. Marx, the 1986 Pulitzer Prize for Investigative Reporting.

== Early life and education ==
Michael M. York was born on April 10, 1953, in High Point, North Carolina. In 1974 he graduated from the University of Kentucky, where he majored in journalism, and four years later graduated from the University of North Carolina School of Law.

== Career ==
He wrote for the Durham Morning Herald and the Legal Times of Washington and served as an attorney for the Kentucky Legislative Research Commission before joining the Lexington Herald-Leader in 1979. In 1981 he became the paper's Washington correspondent.

It was during this time that, along with Jeffrey A. Marx, he authored "Playing Above the Rules", a series of articles exposing improper cash payoffs to University of Kentucky basketball players and improper offers made to recruits by other universities. The authors interviewed 33 former Wildcats – some of whom spoke to Marx and York with the goal of ending the abuses – and the paper sued the university and the state of Kentucky under freedom of information laws to get detailed information, including the names of specific violators, for the series.

The initial reaction to the series was strongly negative: subscribers and advertisers boycotted the Herald-Leader, local media outlets heavily criticized the outlet and accused it of "sensationalism", and the authors received death threats. However, the piece earned Marx and York the 1986 Pulitzer Prize for Investigative Reporting, and led to NCAA regulation changes.

York later became an investigative reporter for The Washington Post, where he broke news of the investigations of United States Representatives Dan Rostenkowski and Carroll Hubbard. He started his own legal practice in 1994.

== Personal life ==
He is married to Rebecca Todd and has three children, Emily, James and Natalie.
