= Ann Desantis =

American journalist

Ann Desantis (born August 27, 1946) is an American journalist for The Boston Globe. In 1972, she won the Pulitzer Prize for Investigative Reporting with Gerard O'Neill, Timothy Leland, and Stephen A. Kurkjian, for exposing corruption in Somerville, Massachusetts.

== Early and personal life ==
Desantis was born on August 27, 1946, in Schenectady, New York, to Thaddeus B. Lewkowicz and Jill Lewkowics née Young. She attended St. Lawrence University, graduating with a Bachelor of Arts in French, and gained a Master of Arts from Harvard University. In 1968, she married William A. Desantis, and they were married until his death in 1970. The following year, Ann Desantis married Stephen A. Kurkjan. She has two children.

== Career ==
In 1968, Desantis began working at the Schenectady Gazette. After two years at that paper, traveled to Boston to take summer classes at Harvard in June 1970. It was that year that she began working at The Boston Globe, where she began as a staff member. It was in that position that she won the 1972 Pulitzer Prize for International Reporting with Gerard O'Neill, Timothy Leland, and Stephen A. Kurkjian, for exposing corruption in Somerville, Massachusetts, as a member of the Spotlight team. The investigation led to 119 Somerville officials being indicted. That year Desantis became a publicity manager at Cahners Publications in Boston and worked there for a year. In 1973, she left to become a freelance writer, working in that capacity until 1985, when she was made associate director at the Washington, D.C. Communications Consortium. In 1991, Desantis was public relations director of The Boston Foundation.
