= Tom McGinty =

American journalist

- Born: Utica, New York
- Education: Bachelor's in Public Relations and Journalism
- Alma mater: Utica College of Syracuse University
- Occupation: journalist
- Years active: 1993–
- Spouse: Jo Craven McGinty
- Awards: Gerald Loeb Award 2011 2012 2015; Pulitzer Prize 2015

Tom McGinty is a Pulitzer Prize-winning investigative journalist known for his use and advocacy of computer-assisted reporting.

== Early life ==
McGinty grew up in Utica, New York. He moved to Minnesota with his family when he was 15. He attended college in Minnesota before moving to Utica College of Syracuse University in New York State, where he graduated in 1993 with a bachelor's degree in public relations and journalism.

== Career ==
McGinty began his career in 1993 working for the Times of Trenton in New Jersey. In 1999, he joined Investigative Reporters and Editors (IRE) as the training director teaching journalists how to use the Internet to aid their investigations. He left in 2001 to join Newsday as a staff writer.

McGinty and fellow Newsday reporters wrote a series of articles in 2004 detailing their investigation into a circulation scandal at the newspaper. Executives had been inflating circulation numbers and the newspaper staff wanted to know how bad the corruption was, so they investigated the scandal themselves. Their 75+ articles published from July through December were finalists for a 2004 IRE Award.

McGinty left Newsday to join The Wall Street Journal at the beginning of 2008 as an investigative reporter specializing in computer-assisted reporting. While there, his work was a finalist for several awards. He earned the 2011 and 2012 Gerald Loeb Awards for Online Enterprise. He was part of a team that sifted through newly released Medicare records and produced a series of reports called "Medicare Unmasked" that earned the 2014 FOI Award from the IRE, the 2015 Gerald Loeb Award for Investigative business journalism, and shared the 2015 Pulitzer Prize for Investigative Journalism. In 2018, he received the New York Press Club Award for Consumer Reporting (Newspaper) for the report, "The Morningstar Mirage".

== Personal life ==
McGinty is married to Pulitzer Prize-winning journalist Jo Craven McGinty.
