= Anthony Cormier =

American journalist

- Education: Florida State University
- Occupation: Journalist
- Writing career
- Notable awards: Pulitzer Prize for Investigative Reporting 2016 Insane. Invisible. In Danger – co-author; Gerald Loeb Award for Investigative 2017 Allegiant Air – co-author; Gerald Loeb Award for Investigative 2023 Profit, Pain, and Private Equity – co-author

Anthony Cormier is an American journalist with Bloomberg News and formerly with BuzzFeed News, the Tampa Bay Times and the Sarasota Herald-Tribune. Cormier was a co-recipient of the 2016 Pulitzer Prize for Investigative Reporting.

== Early life ==
Cormier graduated from Florida State University in 2000 with a degree in creative writing.

== Career ==
Working at the Sarasota Herald-Tribune, Cormier and Matt Doug exposed how Florida police officers with multiple complaints and crimes were able to keep their jobs. Their series of reports, "Unfit for Duty", earned them the 2011 "Print/Online – Small" award from Investigative Reporters and Editors (IRE), and the Herald-Tribune the 2012 EPPY award for Best Investigative/Enterprise Feature on a Website with under 1 million unique monthly visitors.

His investigative work with Michael Braga led to a series of reports on how Florida bankers illegally looted their banks during the real estate boom. The series, "Breaking the Banks", led to lawsuits by the Federal Deposit Insurance Corporation and indictments against three bankers. Cormier and Braga received the 2013 "Print/Online – Small" award for the series from IRE, and the 2013 Best in Business award from the Society for Advancing Business Editing and Writing.

Cormier joined the Tampa Bay Times in 2015. Cormier received the 2016 Pulitzer Prize for Investigative Reporting together with Leonora LaPeter Anton, also of the Times, and Braga, who was still with the Sarasota Hearald-Tribune. Their series of reports, "Insane. Invisible. In danger.", detailed the devastating effects of recurring deep budget cuts in the Florida mental health system. The fallout from the series led to an increase in state appropriations and new legislation aimed at fixing systemic problems.

Cormier earned the 2017 Gerald Loeb Award for Investigative business journalism for "Allegiant Air".

Cormier joined the BuzzFeed News Investigative Unit in early 2017. He received a second Investigative Gerald Loeb Award in 2023 for "Profit, Pain, and Private Equity".

== Controversies ==
On 18 January 2019, Cormier co-authored an explosive report that alleged Donald Trump directed his personal lawyer Michael D. Cohen to lie to Congress about the Moscow tower project, a construction deal at the heart of an investigation by the special counsel Robert Mueller. The report attracted attention because such an action by Trump would constitute a felony. Democratic congressmen publicly mused impeachment.

The report came under scrutiny, however, after Mueller broke precedent by issuing a denial and other news organisations were unable to corroborate the findings with reports of their own.

On April 5, 2019, Cormier co-authored a story that was presented as an update to the January 2019 story. The April story referenced a 12-page memo submitted by Cohen's legal counsel to Congress that said President Trump "encouraged Cohen to lie and say all Moscow Tower project contacts ended as of January 31, 2016 using 'code' language." Subsequently, on April 18, 2019, the original Cohen report was updated to state that the "Mueller report found that Trump did not direct Michael Cohen to lie."

Comier joined Bloomberg News in 2022.
