= Timothy Leland =

American journalist and writer

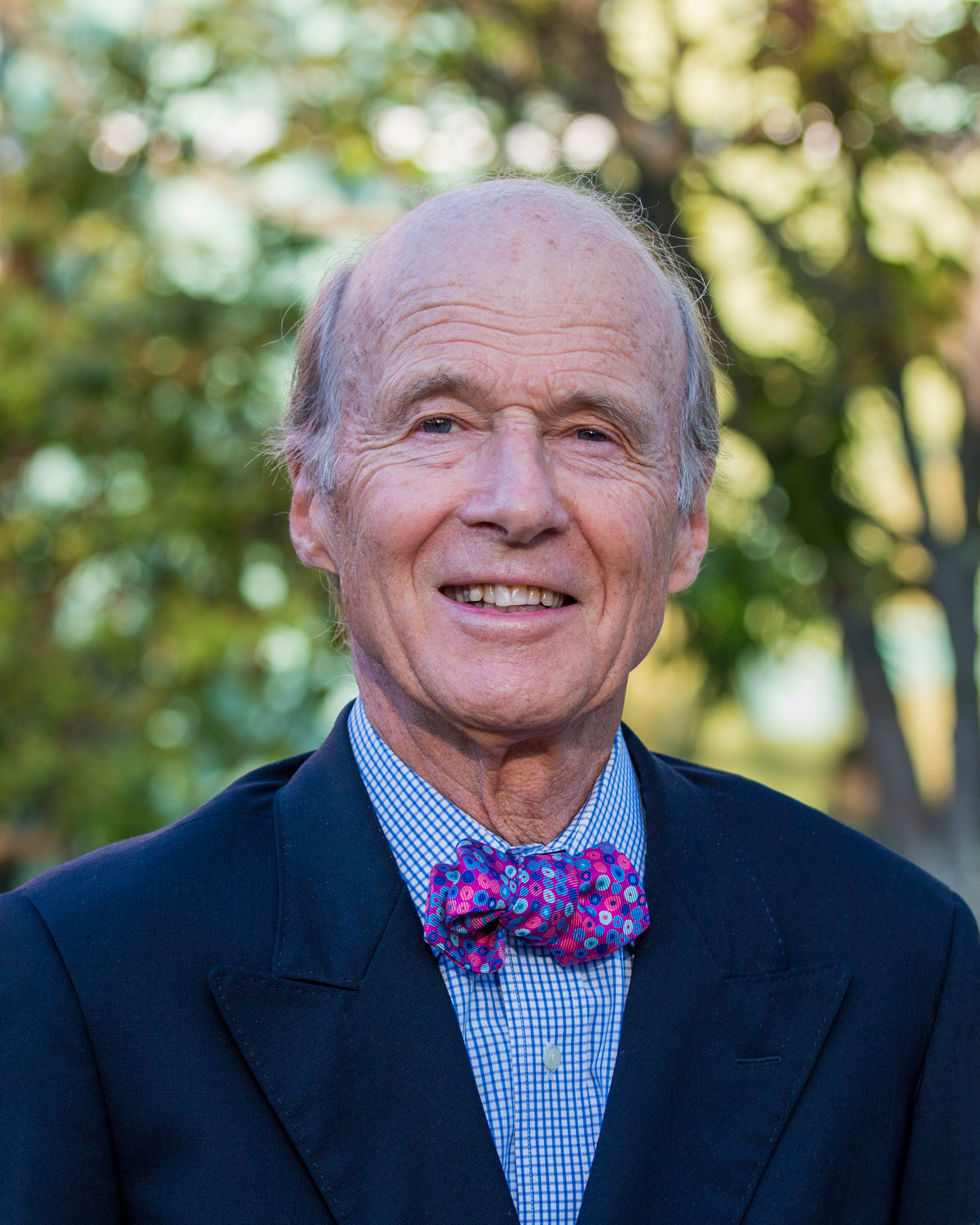
American reporter, investigative journalist, and author, Timothy Leland

Timothy Leland is an American reporter, investigative journalist, and self-published author. His career at The Boston Globe started in 1963 and spanned 36 years before retiring in October 1998 as the Assistant to the Publisher and vice president of the company.

He is best known as the creator and founding editor of the Spotlight Team, the Boston Globe's investigative reporting unit. In 1972, he received the Pulitzer Prize for investigative reporting and served as a Pulitzer Prize Juror for International Reporting in 1981.

== Life ==
Leland was born on September 24, 1937, in Boston, Massachusetts. He is a graduate of Noble and Greenough School (1956) and Harvard (1960) where he graduated cum laude. He received his Master of Science with honors from Columbia School of Journalism in 1961.

== Career ==
After serving two years as a medical writer at the Boston Herald, Timothy Leland joined the Boston Globe in 1963. In his first position as the Globe's Science Editor, much of his early reporting focused on NASA's rocket program of the late 1960s, before turning to politics as the Boston Globe's State House Bureau Chief. Starting in 1968, his primary role switched from reporting to editing, serving in several assistant editor and managing editor roles, including Managing Editor of both the daily and Sunday paper.

During his time at the Globe, he also served as president of the American Association of Sunday and Feature Editors.

=== Spotlight Team ===
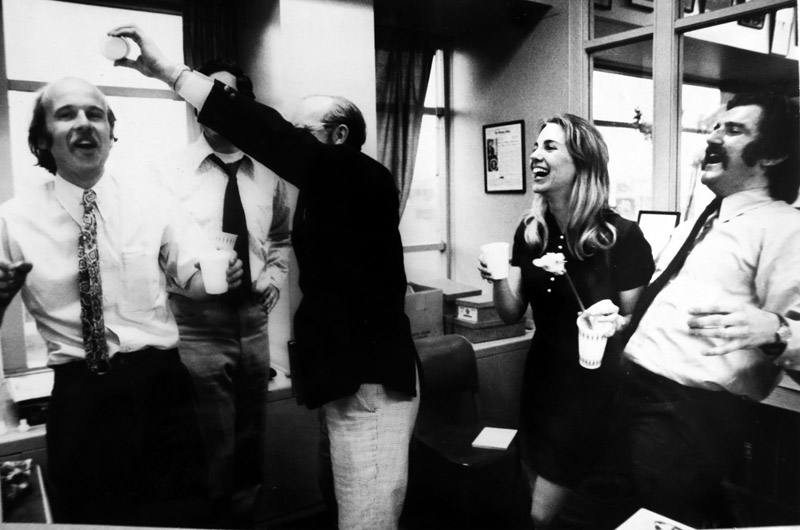
Original Boston Globe Spotlight Team celebrates winning the Pulitzer Prize. Tim Leland, at far left, being "baptized" by Boston Globe editor Tom Winship.

In 1969, Tim Leland was awarded a traveling fellowship to research best practices of newspapers abroad. The year-long sabbatical was split between South Africa and a stint at the London Sunday Times. Upon his return, he proposed the concept of a full-time, multimember team of investigative reporters to the Boston Globe leadership. Despite initial skepticism, the Spotlight Team was approved by then Boston Globe editor Thomas Winship and launched on September 27, 1970.

In 1972, the team, composed of (editor) Timothy Leland, (reporters) Gerard O’Neill and Stephen A. Kurkjian, and (researcher) Ann Desantis won a Pulitzer Prize for a series of reports on municipal corruption in Somerville, MA., including no-bid contracting for an array of government services.

The Spotlight Team went on to win other awards, including a second Pulitzer in 2002 for revealing the Catholic Church's secret protection of pedophile priests, and was the subject of the 2015 Oscar-winning film Spotlight.

== Awards ==
- 1968 Cited by the American Political Science Association for outstanding public affairs reporting
- 1971 Sigma Delta Chi national award for Distinguished Public Service in newspaper journalism
- 1972 Pulitzer Prize for investigative reporting
- 1973 AP Managing Editors Association's Public Service Award
- 2016 Noble and Greenough School Distinguished Graduate Award
