= Eric Lipton =

American journalist (born 1965)

- Born: August 13, 1965 (age 61); Philadelphia, Pennsylvania, U.S.
- Education: University of Vermont
- Occupation: Journalist
- Notable credit: Pulitzer Prize winner (four times)
- Spouse: Elham Dehbozorgi

Eric S. Lipton (born August 13, 1965) is an American reporter at The New York Times based in the Washington Bureau. He has been a working journalist for nearly four decades, with stints at The Washington Post and the Hartford Courant, and he is also the co-author of a history of the World Trade Center.

Lipton joined The Times in 1999, covering the final years of the administration of New York Mayor Rudolph W. Giuliani, as well as the 2001 terror attacks. Since 2004, he has been based in the Washington bureau of The New York Times, where he is an investigative reporter who wrote about the first Trump administration, as well as lobbying and corporate agendas in Congress and Donald Trump's return to the White House for a second term. His previous assignments included the Department of Homeland Security and the Transportation Security Administration, Pentagon contracting, as well as the aftermath of Hurricane Katrina.

Lipton has won or participated in four Pulitzer Prizes, among numerous other journalism awards.

== Career and awards ==
Prior to working for The New York Times, he spent five years each at The Washington Post, the Hartford Courant, and the first two years of his newspaper career at the Valley News in Lebanon, New Hampshire. Lipton is a 1987 graduate of the University of Vermont where he received a BA in philosophy and history as well as working at The Vermont Cynic.

In 2025, he was part of a team of reporters investigating President Trump, his family and senior aides, and ways in which they had enriched themselves as Mr. Trump and his White House team took government actions that benefitted companies owned by their families. The stories examined World Liberty Financial, the crypto company, as well as the $2 billion infusion crypto into World Liberty by the United Arab Emirates, which took place at the same time as Mr. Trump was negotiating a deal to give UAE access to advance artificial intelligence chips. These stories were part of a package that won the 2026 Pulitzer Prize for investigative reporting and the Polk Award for national reporting. The Pulitzer judges cited The Times for "for deeply reported stories that exposed how President Trump has shattered constraints on conflicts of interest and exploited the moneymaking opportunities that come with power, enriching his family and allies."

In 2017, he was part of a team of reporters at The Times awarded the Pulitzer Prize for International Reporting for its coverage on Russia's covert projection of power, including the story entitled "The Perfect Weapon: How Russian Cyberpower Invaded the U.S." examining Russian interference in the 2016 presidential election.

In 2015, he won the Pulitzer Prize for Investigative Reporting for a series of stories about lobbying of state attorneys general and Congress. That series of stories also was awarded the 2015 prize for large circulation newspapers by Investigative Reporters and Editors. He was also among a group of reporters that earned the 2015 Gerald Loeb Award for Beat Reporting.

In 1992, he won a Pulitzer Prize in Explanatory Journalism, at the age of 26, for a series of stories he co-authored at the Hartford Courant on the Hubble Space Telescope with Robert S. Capers. The stories examined the team of scientists who built the main mirror of the Hubble Space Telescope, considered one of the most complex scientific devices at the time of its launch. Facing financial pressures and other challenges, the team built a misshapen main mirror for the space telescope, a flaw that was ultimately corrected but caused embarrassment and questions about the status of United States space science.

In 2021, stories Lipton and other reporters from The New York Times wrote over the prior year about "how the Trump administration consistently failed to respond properly or adequately to the coronavirus threat, including downplaying its seriousness," were named as a Pulitzer Prize finalist in National Reporting.

Other awards include Best in Business Award presented by the Society for Advancing Business Editing and Writing for an investigation into the explosion of sports betting in the United States and a 2025 award from SABEW for a series of stories he contributed to on the risky ways humans are starting to manipulate nature to fight climate change.

Lipton was also a finalist in 1999 for the Livingston Award for young journalists while working as a reporter at The Washington Post, for a series of stories examining the trash industry in New York City, which then shipped most of its waste via truck to landfills in Virginia. In 2008, he was the recipient of an honorary degree from the University of Vermont.

== World Trade Center coverage ==
Lipton spent months after the September 2001 attacks covering the aftermath of the attacks on New York, writing a series of stories for The New York Times and its "Nation Challenged" section about the efforts to recover and identify human remains from the site and to clear the World Trade Center site of the debris left after the attack. Those stories, co-written with James Glanz of The New York Times, were part of a package that was a finalist for the Pulitzer Prize in 2002.

A story in The New York Times Magazine he co-wrote with James Glanz, which appeared on the first anniversary of the attacks, examined the history of the trade center towers. That story was the basis for a book he would co-author with James Glanz, published in 2003, City in the Sky, the Rise and Fall of the World Trade Center, which examined the conception, design, construction, life and ultimate destruction of the twin towers, tracing the story back to the 1950s when the project was first proposed by David Rockefeller. A second story, titled "Fighting to Live as the Towers Died", examined the fate of the unlucky individuals who were stuck above the point of impact in the two towers after the planes hit, a piece based on hundreds of hours of work collecting random emails, text messages and recollections of phone calls with those victims, all of which were assembled into a single narrative. That story formed the basis of a 2004 book called 102 Minutes: The Untold Story of the Fight to Survive Inside the Twin Towers, written by Jim Dwyer and Kevin Flynn, who were co-authors on the original New York Times story.

Archival materials from the Lipton and Glanz research effort—the most comprehensive history ever written about the World Trade Center—are now maintained at the New York Public Library. The materials are separated into five chronological categories: Conception (1945–1970), Construction (1966–1973), Life in the Towers (1972–2001), 9/11, and Post 9/11 (2001–2003) The research was also featured in an episode of the documentary series American Experience, "New York: The Center of the World".

== Homeland Security ==
Lipton was among the first reporters to be assigned to cover the Department of Homeland Security full-time. He started shortly after it was created, writing stories that examined the challenges associated with the largest change in federal bureaucracy since Harry S. Truman was president, and chronicling the agency's struggle as it spent billions of dollars on flawed airport security screening equipment and ships for the Coast Guard. His assignment ended up taking him to disaster zones around the world, including weeks spend in Mississippi and Louisiana in 2005 in the aftermath of Hurricane Katrina, examining flaws in the government response and waste and fraud in hurricane aid. He was also sent in December 2004 to Banda Aceh, along with a team of reporters from The New York Times, to cover the earthquake and tsunami there that killed more than 150,000.

== Energy and Environment ==
Lipton has been one of the nation's leading reporters covering energy and environment issues, examining the influence that lobbyists have undermining regulations intended to protect public health and the environment particularly as it relates to oil production and toxic chemical manufacturing. Other work in this area included stories examining the use of risky technology to attempt to find ways to confront climate change through geoengineering of the environment, and the global search for metals needed to supply the electric-vehicle revolution, including in the Democratic Republic of Congo and on the seabed of the Pacific Ocean.

The investigations included a look at Scott Pruitt, then the Attorney General of Oklahoma, detailing for the first time the secretive alliance Pruitt had with oil and gas companies and other energy producers. These companies were sending tens of millions of dollars to the Republican Attorneys General Association that Pruitt helped run at the same time as Pruitt was helping the companies fight Obama-era environmental regulations, by suing to block these rules in federal court at least 14 times. Lipton found that Pruitt had taken draft letters written by the energy companies, put them on his state government stationery and sent them in to officials in Washington. When Pruitt was later nominated to serve as the head of the Environmental Protection Agency under President Trump, this story became a central focus of his confirmation hearing.

Lipton also investigated how a Canadian-based company seeking to extract metals from the seabed floor of the Pacific Ocean received inside information from the International Seabed Authority allowing it to select one of the best available Pacific Ocean sites to target its mining efforts and later received help to push its project from the UN-affiliated agency's secretary general, reporting that contributed to his ouster.

In 2018, he and a group of other New York Times reporters won the John B. Oakes Award for Environmental Reporting from Columbia University for a series of stories about the Trump administration's effort to rollback environmental protections, including a piece that examined the hiring during Mr. Trump's first term of a chemical industry executive to oversee regulation of toxic chemicals.

The work was also recognized in 2018 by the Society for Environmental Journalists, which cited stories it said offered "a penetrating preview of a government agency tasked with minimizing environmental pollution under a Trump Administration committed to minimizing government regulation."

== Pentagon coverage ==
Lipton investigated the move by venture-capital-backed defense technology firms to secure a large chunk of contracting dollars from the Pentagon. The series of stories also examined the challenges at the Pentagon to figure out how to embrace rapidly changing technology and issues that emerged as artificial intelligence became a war-fighting tool, particular at the Air Force. The stories examine the first efforts in U.S. history to build AI-controlled fighter jets and questions that have emerged about the use of autonomous killing machines that no longer will require a direct human intervention before they attack targets. The reporting also examined the explosive growth of Elon Musk and his SpaceX company, including the haphazard way that SpaceX built its sprawling space launch site near Brownsville, Tx., causing harm to the area environment. Lipton also documented how space has become a warfighting domain, with the United States moving to insert new weapons systems in orbit. Stories by Lipton also examined lobbying and corruption at the Pentagon.

== Trump coverage ==
Lipton has been part of a collection of reporters at The Times who have examined the business operations of The Trump Organization as Donald J. Trump moved to the White House. He has detailed the potential for conflicts of interest, including Trump Hotel in Washington D.C., and Trump operations in the Philippines, Turkey, India, Brazil, Indonesia, Dubai, Vancouver, and other stops. He also looked at how the Trump family took steps to attempt to address some of the issues covered in these stories. Lipton has also written pieces about the arrival within the Trump administration of former lobbyists, corporate lawyers and corporate executives, like Carl Icahn, who have taken up issues with their new powers that may benefit their holdings or past business partners. During the Trump administration, Lipton's coverage focused on environmental consequences of regulatory rollbacks made at the Environmental Protection Agency and the Interior Department and how tax cuts that President Trump championed benefitted some of his wealthy friends. He also spent much of 2020 covering the coronavirus outbreak, working with teams of other reporters examining the reasons behind the flawed federal response by the White House and the Centers for Disease Control and Prevention.

His work has been featured in a number of other documentary films, including The Falling Man, by Harry Singer, and War on Whistleblowers: Free Press and the National Security State, a 2013 film examining government whistleblowers. He also served as a consultant to the 2020 documentary film Totally Under Control, directed by Alex Gibney, Ophelia Harutyunyan, Suzanne Hillinger, which examined the Trump administration response to the coronavirus pandemic.

== Personal life ==
Lipton lives in Washington, D.C., with his wife, Elham Dehbozorgi.
