= Dan Malone =

American journalist

Danny Frank Malone (born January 22, 1955) is an American journalist, an investigative reporter who won a Pulitzer Prize. Malone currently works for the Fort Worth Weekly, an alternative newspaper.

Malone worked as a reporter for the Corpus Christi Caller-Times and the Fort Worth Star-Telegram before joining The Dallas Morning News in 1985. In 2002, he joined the staff of the Fort Worth Weekly.

Malone has taught journalism classes at Tarleton State University and at the University of North Texas as an adjunct professor, while also serving as a Hearst Visiting Professional-in-Residence for the UT-Austin journalism program and Jurist for the Mayborn Literary Nonfiction Writers Conference of the Southwest (associated with the Mayborn School of Journalism at UNT).

Malone is a graduate of Kimball High School in Dallas and the University of Texas at Austin.

Malone and Lorraine Adams of The Dallas Morning News shared the 1992 Pulitzer Prize for Investigative Reporting, citing "reporting that charged Texas police with extensive misconduct and abuses of power".

== Books ==
- America's Condemned: death row inmates in their own words, by Malone and Howard Swindle (Kansas City: A. McMeel Pub, 1999) ISBN 0-836281985
