= Robert S. Capers =

American journalist

- Born: July 15, 1949; Boston, Massachusetts
- Education: Colby College; University of Connecticut
- Occupation: Journalist

Robert S. Capers (born July 15, 1949) is an American journalist.

Capers won the 1992 Pulitzer Prize for Explanatory Reporting with Eric Lipton for a series about the Hubble Space Telescope that illustrated many of the problems with America's space program. He worked at the Hartford Courant until 1995.
