= Stephen Berry (journalist) =

American journalist (born 1948)

Stephen J. Berry (born 1948) is an American investigative journalist. In 1993, while working for The Orlando Sentinel, he and Jeff Brazil won the Pulitzer Prize for Investigative Reporting for a report exposing a sheriff department drug squad's unlawful seizure of millions of dollars from motorists, mostly minorities. He is now an associate professor at The University of Iowa's School of Journalism and Mass Communication. Berry is the author of a book about investigative journalism entitled Watchdog Journalism: The Art of Investigative Reporting.

== Education ==
Berry obtained his BA in political science from the University of Montevallo. In 1984, he received his MA in American history from the University of Northern Carolina Greensboro.

== Career ==
Berry is co-founder and interim executive director of The Iowa Center for Public Affairs Journalism. Before becoming a professor, he had been a journalist for 33 years, finishing his career as a journalist working for the Los Angeles Times. His works mainly focused on race relations, the criminal justice system, police abuse of power, medical malpractice, stock-car racingm guns, government and illegal drugs.

== Awards and honors ==
Berry has won a number of awards for his investigative and daily reporting which include:

- Associated Press Newspaper Executive Council Award for public service
- National Benjamin Fine and the N.C. School Bell awards for education reporting
- Los Angeles Times’ Top of the Times Award
- National Headliners Award finalist for public service
- Society of Professional Journalists Award
- Champion of Justice Journalism Award by National Association of Criminal Defense Lawyers Association (1993)
- Pulitzer Prize for Investigative Reporting(1993)
- Florida Sports Writers Association award for Investigative Reporting
