= Jason Zengerle =

Political journalist

Jason Gray Zengerle is a political reporter. Since December 2025, he is a staff writer at The New Yorker. According to Politico writer Hadas Gold, Zengerle is "known for his deep dives into political themes".

== Early life and education ==
Zengerle attended Landon School, a private all-boys preparatory school in Bethesda, Maryland, graduating in 1992. He then studied at Swarthmore College, graduating in 1996. He has subsequently been a member of the Swarthmore Alumni Council.

== Career ==
Early in his career, he was a writing fellow at the American Prospect. His 2007 article "The Accidental Populist", originally published in The New Republic was anthologized in Best American Political Writing 2007. A 2012 profile of Peter Beinart for the New York magazine following the publication of Beinart's book, The Crisis of Zionism, received praise from Ira Glunts in Mondoweiss and Marc Tracy in Tablet. Beginning in 2013, Zengerle was a staff writer at Politico and a GQ contributor.

Zengerle was hired as a senior editor at The New Republic by Franklin Foer, the magazine's editor, in early 2014, but left the magazine in December 2014 as part of a wider exodus when owner Chris Hughes took closer control and appointed Gabriel Snyder as editor. In 2015, he became political correspondent at GQ. At the same time, he became a contributing editor for New York Magazine. In 2016, he left New York Magazine to become a contributing writer at The New York Times Magazine, while continuing at GQ.

Zengerle received the 2019 Toner Prize for Excellence in Political Reporting from the Newhouse School at Syracuse University. In 2023, Zengerle was a national fellow at think tank New America. Since December 2025, he has been a staff writer at The New Yorker. In 2026, he published a biography of Tucker Carlson, Hated By All the Right People. Zengerle's book was written without Carlson's cooperation. The New York Times called the book "breezy, entertaining and ultimately disquieting".

== Personal life ==
Zengerle is married and lives with his wife, a physician and fellow Swarthmore graduate, and two children in Chapel Hill, North Carolina.
