= Lancaster Eagle-Gazette =

Newspaper published in Lancaster, Ohio

- Type: Daily newspaper
- Owner: USA Today Co.
- Founded: 1936
- Headquarters: Lancaster, Ohio United States
- Circulation: 6,041
- Website: www.lancastereaglegazette.com

The Lancaster Eagle-Gazette is a daily newspaper based in Lancaster, Ohio in the United States and founded in 1936. Before 1936, it was known as Lancaster Daily Eagle (1890–1936). The newspaper has a daily circulation of 6,041 copies and a Sunday circulation of 8,304 copies. The Sunday version is also known with its alternative name Sunday Eagle Gazette. The newspaper is owned by USA Today Co.
