= Lorraine Adams =

American journalist and novelist

- Born: United States
- Education: Princeton University (BA); Columbia University (MA)
- Occupation: Journalist
- Spouse: Richard Price
- Writing career
- Genres: Novelist, journalism
- Notable awards: Pulitzer Prize for Investigative Reporting, Guggenheim Fellowship

Lorraine Adams is an American journalist and novelist. As a journalist, she is known as a contributor to the New York Times Book Review, and a former contributor to The Washington Post. As a novelist, she is known for the award-winning Harbor and its follow-up, The Room and the Chair.

== Early life ==
Lorraine Adams graduated magna cum laude with an A.B. in English from Princeton University in 1981 after completing a 76-page-long senior thesis titled "The Hero in Ezra Pound's Cantos." She then attended Columbia University, graduating with an M.A. in English and American Literature in 1982.

== Career ==
=== Journalism ===
Adams was a staff writer for The Washington Post, and The Dallas Morning News. Between 2005 and 2006, she contributed regularly to the New York Times Book Review, publishing six reviews with them. In 2010 she was a fellow at the John Simon Guggenheim Memorial Foundation.

Adams and Dan Malone of The Dallas Morning News shared the 1992 Pulitzer Prize for Investigative Reporting, citing "reporting that charged Texas police with extensive misconduct and abuses of power", including rights violations.

=== Novels ===
Adams's first novel was published in 2004, Harbor, featuring North African Arab stowaways. It won accolades including a Los Angeles Times Award for First Fiction, Virginia Commonwealth University's First Novelist Award, praise from Entertainment Weekly, and a place on the New York Times Book Review's list of 100 Notable Books of 2004.

Her second novel, The Room and the Chair, was published in 2010 and details the life of an American fighter pilot. The German-language edition is Crash (Zürich: Arche, 2011).

Amy Wilentz, reviewing The Room and the Chair in the Los Angeles Times, opined, "Lorraine Adams is a singular and important American writer. The Room and the Chair establishes this without question: It is remarkable for its ambitions and its achievements. It's a war novel, a reporter's novel and a psychological thriller. It encompasses the broadest outlines of our world. It is also Adams' second novel, and it is gutsier and throws a wider net than the topical and gorgeously written Harbor, her first. Both books are about U.S. involvement in the Middle East, about psychological and political blowback, about what happens when you wage a war and then suddenly it slaps you back, blindsides you."

== Personal life ==
Adams lives in Harlem, New York and is married to the novelist Richard Price.

== Awards ==
- 1992 Pulitzer Prize for Investigative Reporting
- 2006 VCU First Novelist Award
- 2010 Guggenheim Fellowship

== Selected works ==
- "Almost Famous", Washington Monthly, April 2002
- Harbor, Random House, Inc., 2005, ISBN 978-1-4000-7688-8
- The Room and the Chair, Knopf, 2010, ISBN 978-0-307-27241-6
- NYC 22 "Block Party" July 2012
