= John Harold Brislin =

American journalist

John Harold Brislin was an American journalist and reporter for the Scranton Tribune in Scranton, Pennsylvania.

== Awards ==
Brislin was awarded the 1959 Pulitzer Prize for Local Reporting - No Edition time, "For displaying courage, initiative and resourcefulness in his effective four-year campaign to halt labor violence in his home city, as a result of which ten corrupt union officials were sent to jail and a local union was embolden to clean out racketeering elements".
