= Al Delugach =

American journalist (1925–2015)

Albert L. Delugach
- Born: October 27, 1925; Memphis, Tennessee
- Died: January 4, 2015 (aged 89)
- Education: University of Missouri
- Occupation: Journalist
- Employer: Los Angeles Times
- Awards: 1969 Pulitzer Prize, 1984 Gerald Loeb Award

Albert Lawrence Delugach (October 27, 1925 – January 4, 2015) was an American journalist. He won the Pulitzer Prize in 1969 and the Gerald Loeb Award in 1984. He spent nearly 4 decades as a reporter. He spent the first half of his career working in Saint Louis, for The Kansas City Star, the St. Louis Globe-Democrat, and the St. Louis Post-Dispatch. Delugach spent the last 20-years of his career with the Los Angeles Times, retiring in 1989. He died of mesothelioma in January 2015 in Los Feliz, Los Angeles. He was 89 years old.

== Background and education ==
Delugach was born in Memphis, Tennessee. In 1943, he left high school early, and enlisted in the Navy. After the war (World War II), he received his high school equivalency and then attended the University of Missouri, majoring in journalism.

== Career ==
Delugach began his career at The Kansas City Star in 1951, eventually leaving to work for the St. Louis Globe-Democrat, where he and fellow reporter Denny Walsh, won the 1969 Pulitzer Prize for Investigative Reporting for exposing corruption within a St. Louis labor union.

After spending three years investigating the Local 562 Steamfitters union, their reports led to multiple federal indictments involving kickbacks in sales of insurance and the union's pension fund. However, a new publisher, G. Duncan Bauman, refused to publish one of the key stories, about the federal government refusing to prosecute the kickbacks. Delugach's partner, Walsh, unhappy with the move, quit after leaking the story to a reporter at The Wall Street Journal, causing the Justice Department to reverse its position, and prosecute the offenders.

Delugach left the Globe-Democrat and wrote for the St. Louis Post-Dispatch reporting on the oil boom, with William K. Want Jr., from Alaska. The 6-story series covered the oil companies, the decision to build the Trans-Alaska Pipeline System, an 800-mile pipeline, and the financial interests of Secretary of Interior (former governor of Alaska), Wally Hickel. Their stories were entered into the Congressional record in December, 1969. Delugach left the Post-Dispatch after just 18 months and went to work for the Los Angeles Times.

In 1984, he shared the Gerald Loeb Award for Spot News, with Ronald Soble, for their coverage of the death of gold trader Alan D. Saxon. Delugach retired from the Los Angeles Times, in 1989.
