= Beth Reinhard =

Pulitzer prize winning American investigative journalist

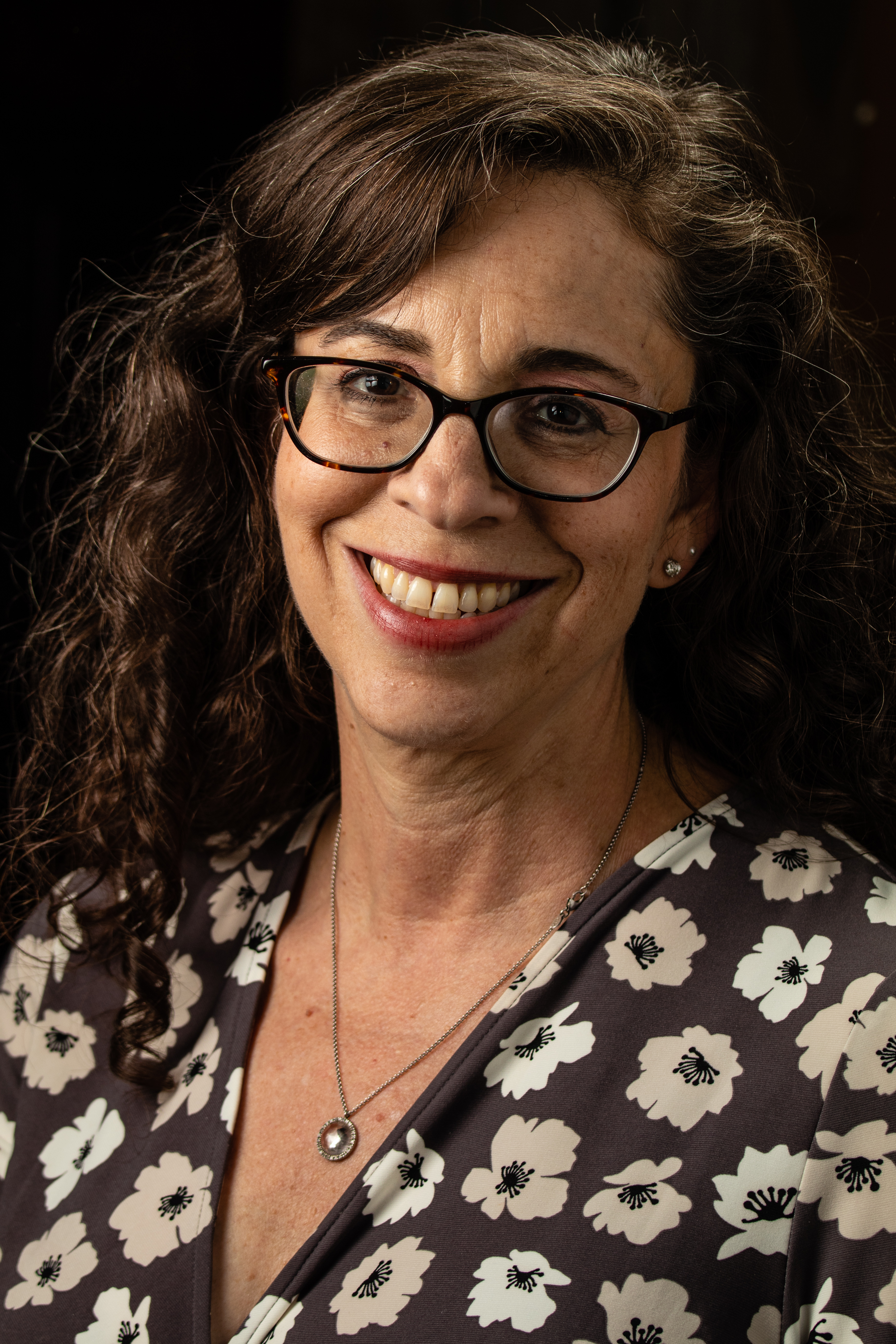
- Beth Reinhard in 2018
- Education: BA, MA
- Alma mater: University of Pennsylvania; Columbia University School of Journalism
- Known for: Breaking news story on Roy Moore sexual misconduct allegations

Beth Reinhard is a Pulitzer Prize-winning American investigative journalist at The Washington Post. She is best known for reporting on sexual misconduct allegations against Roy Moore, which was widely regarded as having altered the course of the 2017 United States Senate special election in Alabama.

== Education and career ==
Reinhard received a bachelor's degree in English from the University of Pennsylvania in 1990 and a master's degree in journalism from Columbia University School of Journalism in 1991. She began her journalistic career at the Home News Tribune in New Brunswick. Subsequently, Reinhard returned to her home state of Florida, where she wrote for The Palm Beach Post and The Miami Herald. She was the lead political correspondent for the National Journal during the 2012 United States presidential election. Reinhard covered criminal justice for The Wall Street Journal. Reinhard has also written for The Atlantic.

As an investigative reporter at The Washington Post, Reinhard was part of the team that first reported on Roy Moore's sexual misconduct allegations in 2017, altering the course of the 2017 United States Senate special election in Alabama. They were awarded the 2018 Pulitzer Prize for Investigative Reporting and a Special Award of the 69th George Polk Awards for work published in 2017.

== Personal life ==
Reinhard is married to journalist Ronnie Greene. They have two children and live in Falls Church, Virginia.
