= Jeff Brazil =

American journalist

Jeff Brazil is a Pulitzer Prize-winning American journalist, writer, and editor who received, along with fellow journalist Steve Berry, the Pulitzer Prize for Investigative Journalism in 1993 for a series of articles published in the Orlando Sentinel on unjust and racially motivated traffic stops and money seizures by a Florida Sheriff's drug task force. Brazil was a staff writer for the Orlando Sentinel from 1989 to 1993.

Brazil also won a Scripps Howard award for environmental journalism in 1991 for a year-long examination of the then-failing efforts to save the endangered manatee in Florida.

From 1993 to 2000, Brazil worked as a writer and editor with the Los Angeles Times. In 1994 he won the Worth Bingham Prize for a series of stories exposing lapses within the Federal Aviation Administration on safety issues following a fatal crash at John Wayne Airport that killed five people, including the president of In-N-Out Burger. The award was presented to him by President Bill Clinton.

Brazil has also written for magazines on the subjects of technology, sports, culture, finance, politics, criminal justice, and social innovation.

He currently is part of a MacArthur Foundation-funded research effort at the University of California's Humanities Research Institute that is analyzing the impact of the Internet and digital media on education, participatory politics, and youth culture. As communication director for the Digital Media and Learning Research Hub, he directs editorial, media production, and strategic communication.
