= Toner Prize for Excellence in Political Reporting =

Political Reporting Prize in the United States

The Robin Toner Program in Political Reporting
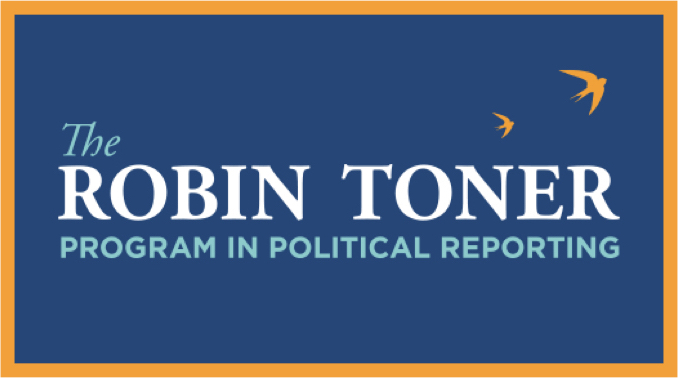
- Formation: 2009
- Purpose: Created to celebrate the life and work of Syracuse University alumna Robin Toner, the late political correspondent for The New York Times
- Main organ: Syracuse University
- Website: tonerprogram.syr.edu

The Robin Toner Program in Political Reporting was established in 2009 to celebrate the life and work of Robin Toner, the late New York Times political correspondent. It is awarded by the S.I. Newhouse School of Public Communications of Syracuse University.

The program includes the annual Toner Prize for Excellence in Political Reporting and Toner Prize Celebration. The award, which includes $5,000, is presented at an annual ceremony that features a distinguished speaker. In 2016, then-President Barack Obama delivered the keynote address.

Entries are judged on how well they reflect the high standards and depth of reporting that marked Toner's work. In particular, the judges look for how well the entries:

- illuminate the electoral process or
- reveal the politics of policy and
- engage the public in democracy.

Entries must be fact-based reporting, not commentary. Single articles, series or a body of work are eligible. Books are ineligible.

== Toner Prize recipients ==
Year	Recipient	News Organization(s)	Description of Entry
2011	Craig Harris	Arizona Republic	for an 8-part series on Arizona's broken and expensive public pension plan.
2012	Jane Mayer	The New Yorker	for an in-depth look, titled State for Sale, at the effects on North Carolina of Citizens United v. Federal Elections Commission.
2013	Molly Ball	The Atlantic	for her in-depth reporting on the 2012 election.
2014	Karen Tumulty	The Washington Post	for her reporting on politicians, such as Senate Minority Leader Mitch McConnell of Kentucky and Sen. Ted Cruz, R-Texas, as well as her in-depth look at the political landscape in West Virginia.
2015	Dan Balz	The Washington Post	for a series of political profiles that illuminated the partisan divide in Washington.
2016	Alec MacGillis	ProPublica	for a collection of stories on issues in politics and governance.
2017	David Fahrenthold	The Washington Post	for “A Portrait of Donald Trump,” a series of articles highlighting his yearlong reporting on Trump.
2018	Team from The Washington Post	The Washington Post	for its coverage of candidate Roy Moore and the 2017 Alabama Senate race, which uncovered a pattern of sexual misconduct by Moore.
2019	Jason Zengerle	The New York Times Magazine,GQ	for his reporting on the effects of Trump presidency on the House Intelligence Committee.
2020	Team from The Boston Globe	The Boston Globe	for the 2019 Back to the Battleground series in which the eight-member team of Globe reporters covered four key battleground states that helped decide the 2016 presidential election.
2021	David A. Graham	The Atlantic	for coverage of the 2020 presidential election, focusing particularly on undecided voters in swing states and election integrity.
2022	(National) Team from The Washington Post (Local) David Wickert, Mark Niesse, Greg Bluestein, Maya T. Prabhu, Tia Mitchell, Isaac Sabetai and Jim Galloway.	The Washington Post; The Atlanta Journal-Constitution	for "The Attack", an investigation into what happened before, during and after the 2021 United States Capitol attack. for "Inside the Campaign to Undermine Georgia’s Election"
2023	(National) Josh Gerstein, Alex Ward, Peter Canellos, Hailey Fuchs, Heidi Przybyla, Elena Schneider and Holly Otterbein (Local) Phil Williams	Politico; WTVF Nashville	for "The Supreme Court and Abortion", reporting that leaked the draft of U.S. Supreme Court decision that struck down the landmark Roe v. Wade decision. for "Revealed” investigation; efforts to look into how laws are made in the supermajority ruled Tennessee General Assembly.
2024	(National) Greg Jaffe and Patrick Marley (Local) Anna Orso, Sean Walsh, Julia Terruso, Aseem Shukla and Layla Jones	The Washington Post; Philadelphia Inquirer	"Ottawa County" "The race for Philadelphia’s 100th mayor"
2025	(National) Reporters: Peter Eisler, Ned Parker, Aram Roston and Joseph Tanfani (Local) Spencer Kent and Riley Yates	Reuters; NJ Advance Media	"The Politics of Menace" "Project Extreme"

== Toner Prize Celebration speakers ==
Year	Format	Speaker(s)
2009	Panel	Gwen Ifill (PBS), Richard Berke (The New York Times), Dan Balz (The Washington Post), Jackie Calmes (The New York Times), Beth Frerking (Politico), and Adam Nagourney (The New York Times)
2011	Conversation	Marilyn Werber Serafini (Kaiser Health News)
2012	Panel	Jane Mayer (The New Yorker), Peggy Simpson (Women’s Media Center), Lynette Clemetson (NPR), and Kristin Carlson (WCAX-TV)
2013	Keynote	Kathleen Sebelius, U.S. Secretary of Health and Human Services
2014	Keynote	Joe Biden, Vice President of the United States
2015	Keynote	Hillary Clinton, U.S. Secretary of State
2016	Keynote	Barack Obama, President of the United States
2017	Keynote	John Kasich, Governor of Ohio
2018	Keynote	Mark Warner, U.S. Senator from Virginia
2019	Keynote	Larry Hogan, Governor of Maryland
2020	-	No ceremony due to COVID-19 pandemic
2021	Keynote	Cory Booker, U.S. Senator from New Jersey
2022	Keynote	Nancy Pelosi, Speaker of the United States House of Representatives
2023	Keynote	Mitt Romney, U.S. Senator from Utah
2024	Keynote	Roy Cooper, Governor of North Carolina
2025	Conversation	Maribel Perez Wadsworth & Boris Sanchez
