= 2006 Pulitzer Prize =

Awards for journalism and related fields

The 2006 Pulitzer Prizes were announced on April 17, 2006.

The board announced in December 2005, that they will consider more online material in all 14 journalism categories.

For the first time since 1997, the Pulitzer board declined to award a Pulitzer Prize for Drama.

== Journalism ==
Public service	The Times-Picayune	" ... for its heroic, multi-faceted coverage of Hurricane Katrina and its aftermath, making exceptional use of the newspaper's resources to serve an inundated city even after evacuation of the newspaper plant. (Selected by the Board from the Public Service category, where it was entered.)"
Public service	Sun Herald	" ... for its valorous and comprehensive coverage of Hurricane Katrina, providing a lifeline for devastated readers, in print and online, during their time of greatest need."
Breaking news reporting	Staff of The Times-Picayune	" ... for its courageous and aggressive coverage of Hurricane Katrina, overcoming desperate conditions facing the city and the newspaper."
Investigative reporting	Susan Schmidt, James V. Grimaldi and R. Jeffrey Smith, The Washington Post	" ... for their indefatigable probe of Washington lobbyist Jack Abramoff that exposed congressional corruption and produced reform efforts."
Explanatory reporting	David Finkel, The Washington Post	" ... for his ambitious, clear-eyed case study of the United States government's attempt to bring democracy to Yemen."
Beat reporting	Dana Priest, The Washington Post	for her persistent, painstaking reports on secret "black site" prisons and other controversial features of the government's counterterrorism campaign.
National reporting	James Risen and Eric Lichtblau of The New York Times	for their carefully sourced stories on secret domestic eavesdropping that stirred a national debate on the boundary line between fighting terrorism and protecting civil liberty.
National reporting	Staffs of The San Diego Union-Tribune and Copley News Service, with notable work by Marcus Stern and Jerry Kammer	" ... for their disclosure of bribe-taking that sent former Rep. Randy Cunningham to prison in disgrace."
International reporting	Joseph Kahn and Jim Yardley, The New York Times	" ... for their ambitious stories on ragged justice in China as the booming nation's legal system evolves."
Feature writing	Jim Sheeler, Rocky Mountain News	" ... for his poignant story on a Marine major who helps the families of comrades killed in Iraq cope with their loss and honor their sacrifice."
Commentary	Nicholas D. Kristof, The New York Times	" ... for his graphic, deeply reported columns that, at personal risk, focused attention on genocide in Darfur and that gave voice to the voiceless in other parts of the world."
Criticism	Robin Givhan of The Washington Post	" ... for her witty, closely observed essays that transform fashion criticism into cultural criticism."
Editorial writing	Rick Attig and Doug Bates, The Oregonian	" ... for their persuasive, richly reported editorials on abuses inside a forgotten Oregon mental hospital."
Editorial cartooning	Mike Luckovich, The Atlanta Journal-Constitution	" ... for his powerful cartoons on an array of issues, drawn with a simple but piercing style."

== Letters and Drama ==
Fiction	March by Geraldine Brooks (Viking)
Drama	No award given
History	Polio: An American Story by David M. Oshinsky (Oxford University Press)
Biography or Autobiography	American Prometheus: The Triumph and Tragedy of J. Robert Oppenheimer by Kai Bird and Martin J. Sherwin (Alfred A. Knopf)
Poetry	Late Wife by Claudia Emerson (Louisiana State University Press)
General Nonfiction	Imperial Reckoning: The Untold Story of Britain's Gulag in Kenya by Caroline Elkins (Henry Holt)
Music	Piano Concerto: 'Chiavi in Mano' by Yehudi Wyner (Associated Music Publishers) Premiered February 17, 2005, by the Boston Symphony Orchestra.

== Special Citations ==
- Edmund S. Morgan, a Special Citation to Edmund S. Morgan for a creative and deeply influential body of work as an American historian that spans the last half century.
- Thelonious Monk, a posthumous Special Citation to American composer Thelonious Monk for a body of distinguished and innovative musical composition that has had a significant and enduring impact on the evolution of jazz.
