= Worth Bingham Prize =

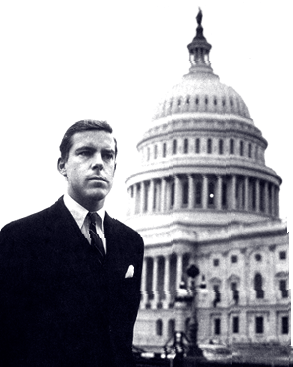
- Worth Bingham, from Worth Bingham Prize.
- Awarded for: "The Worth Bingham Prize honors newspaper or magazine investigative reporting of stories of national significance where the public interest is being ill-served."
- Location: Washington, D.C.
- Country: United States
- First award: 1967
- Website: http://nieman.harvard.edu/awards/worth-bingham-prize-for-investigative-journalism/

The Worth Bingham Prize, also referred to as the Worth Bingham Prize for Investigative Reporting, is an annual journalism award which honors: "newspaper or magazine investigative reporting of stories of national significance where the public interest is being ill-served."

== About the prize ==
Established in 1967, the prize is named for Robert W. "Worth" Bingham, a newspaper heir and reporter who died at the age of thirty-four. Bingham graduated from Harvard College in 1954 and served as an officer in the United States Navy. He joined the staff of the Louisville Courier-Journal and Times in 1961, where he received a National Headliner Award for his series on "Our Costly Congress." Before he died in 1966 in an accident on Nantucket Island, he was assistant to the publisher.

The prize is seen as a recognition of the best investigative reporting in American newspapers and newsmagazines. The investigative reporting recognized tends to involve violations of the law, inefficiencies in government; or conflicts of interest and questions of impropriety. The three-judge panel of the Worth Bingham Prize considers the impediments the journalist faced during their research, their style of writing, and the impact their piece has had on the public. Worth Bingham Prize judges include representatives from the Radio-Television News Directors Association, Copley News Service, The New York Times, and Bloomberg News. The prize was funded through the tax-exempt Worth Bingham Memorial Fund, which is headquartered in Washington, D.C. In order to be eligible for the prize, journalists may submit a single piece, a related number of articles, or three unrelated stories. Columns and editorial pieces are also eligible for the prize. For many years the winner was honored at the annual awards dinner of the National Press Foundation.

The first award was given in 1967 to William Lambert of LIFE magazine. Notable recipients include Seymour Hersh of Dispatch News Service in 1969, for uncovering the My Lai massacre during The Vietnam War; and Bob Woodward and Carl Bernstein in 1972, for their reports on the Watergate scandal involving Richard Nixon. Woodward won the award a second time in 1987, for his reporting on secrecy and covert action in United States foreign policy.

Since 2008, the prize has been administered by the Nieman Foundation for Journalism at Harvard University. The prize money in 2025 is $20,000.

== Recipients ==
- 1967: William Lambert, Life, Senator Edward V. Long's Help-Hoffa campaign.
- 1968: Special Assignment Team, The Associated Press, a collection of reports on various ways the federal government wasted taxpayers’ money.
- 1969: Seymour Hersh, Dispatch News Service, My Lai massacre series.
- 1970: James Clayton, The Washington Post, editorial series criticizing President Nixon's nominee to the Supreme Court, G. Harrold Carswell.
- 1971: Frank Wright, Minneapolis Star Tribune, uncovered illegal campaign donations to Nixon's re-election campaign in "How dairy lobby applied financial weight to secure a favorable decision on price supports; implications in political process".
- 1972: Carl Bernstein, Bob Woodward, The Washington Post, bugging of Democratic National Headquarters at the Watergate.
- 1973: Jerry Landauer, The Wall Street Journal, Spiro Agnew series.
- 1974: Maxine Cheshire, Washington Post series on whereabouts of state gifts to U.S. officials and their families from foreign leaders and dignitaries. (Presented at the White House Correspondents' Association dinner.)
- 1975: James V. Risser, The Des Moines Register, series on corruption in the grain-exporting business.
- 1976: Morton Mintz, The Washington Post, "The Medicine Business" series.
- 1977: Michael J. Sniffen, Richard E. Meyer, The Associated Press, reporting on the Office of Management and Budget director Bert Lance having used the same stock as collateral for two different loans.
- 1978: David Hess, Akron Beacon Journal, for a body of work on problems with Firestone's steel-belted radial tires.
- 1979: John Fialka, The Washington Star, "Nifty Nugget" series on U.S. military shortcomings, as revealed by a secret military exercise in Europe. (Presented at the White House Correspondents' Association dinner.)
- 1980: Two winners: Ralph Soda, Gannett for "Papers", a series on an attempt by two brothers to corner the world's silver market; Ted Gup, Jonathan Neumann, The Washington Post, series exposing how companies bribed federal government officials for lucrative government consulting contracts.
- 1981: Patrick Oster, Bruce Ingersoll, Chicago Sun-Times, "Defense Dilemmas".
- 1982: Alan Green, Bill Hogan, Diane Kiesel, The New Republic, "The New Slush Fund Scandal: How congressmen live high on campaign money".
- 1983: Dennis Camire, Mark Rohner, Sharon Johnson, Gannett News Service, Series investigating fraud and mismanagement in the U.S. Department of Agriculture's Farmers Home Administration (FmHA).
- 1984: First place: Brooks Jackson, David Rogers, The Wall Street Journal, "Money and Politics"; second place: Chris Collins, John Hanchette, Gannett News Service, "The Vaccine Machine".
- 1985: David Ashenfelter, Laura Berman, Tom Hundley, Larry Kostecke, Michael Wagner, Detroit Free Press, series questioning Michigan Corrections Department's practices on prisoner release.
- 1986: Bob Woodward, The Washington Post, "Secrecy in Government" regarding the Reagan administration.
- 1987: Staff and editors, Newsday, "The Rush to Burn: America’s Garbage Gamble".
- 1988: Bill Dedman, The Atlanta Journal-Constitution, "The Color of Money: lending practices discriminate against blacks".
- 1989: Jenni Bergal, Fred Schulte, Fort Lauderdale News and Sun-Sentinel, "Crisis in Care: How HRS Fails Florida".
- 1990: Keith McKnight, Bob Paynter, Andrew Zajac, Akron Beacon Journal, reports on corruption in Ohio politics.
- 1991: Richard Behar, Time, "Scientology: The Cult of Greed".
- 1992: David Boardman, Susan Gilmore, Eric Nalder, Eric Pryne, The Seattle Times, sexual harassment investigation of U.S. Senator Brock Adams.
- 1993: Craig Flournoy, Randy Lee Loftis, The Dallas Morning News, "Race and Risk" reportage on government plans to force thousands of poor black residents to live in a Superfund toxic site.
- 1994: Two winners: Jeff Brazil, Los Angeles Times, "Dangerous Delays at the FAA"; and Ralph Blumenthal, Douglas Frantz, The New York Times, US Air series.
- 1995: Two winners: Jenni Bergal, Fred Schulte, Sun-Sentinel, "The Medicaid HMO Game: Poor Care, Big Profits" (and other related articles); and Chris Adams, Times-Picayune, "Medicaid Madness" reports profiteering in Louisiana Medicaid program.
- 1996: Byron Acohido, The Seattle Times, "Safety at Issue: the 737".
- 1997: Douglas Frantz, The New York Times, "Taxes and Tactics".
- 1998: R. G. Dunlop, Gardiner Harris, The Courier-Journal, "Dust, Deception and Death".
- 1999: Choe Sang-hun, Charles J. Hanley, Martha Mendoza, Randy Herschaft, Associated Press, No Gun Ri massacre series.
- 2000: Michael Grunwald, The Washington Post, series on the Army Corps of Engineers.
- 2001: Ken Armstrong, Steve Mills, Maurice Possley, Chicago Tribune, "Cops and Confessions".
- 2002: Staff, The Boston Globe, abuse in the Catholic Church series.
- 2003: David Willman, Los Angeles Times, "Stealth Merger: Drug Companies and Government Medical Research".
- 2004: Diana B. Henriques, The New York Times, "Captive Clientele" – revealed how insurance companies, investment firms and lenders have swindled thousands of active-duty soldiers.
- 2005: Susan Schmidt, James V. Grimaldi, R. Jeffrey Smith, The Washington Post, lobbying practices and influence of Jack Abramoff.
- 2006: Lisa Chedekel, Matthew Kauffman, Hartford Courant, "Mentally Unfit, Forced to Fight".
- 2007: Dana Priest, Anne Hull, The Washington Post, "Walter Reed and Beyond".
- 2008: Jim Schaefer, M. L. Elrick, Detroit Free Press, "A Mayor in Crisis".
- 2009: Raquel Rutledge, Milwaukee Journal Sentinel, "Cashing in on Kids".
- 2010: Michael J. Berens, The Seattle Times, "Seniors for Sale: Exploiting the aged and frail in Washington’s adult family homes".
- 2011: Michael Finnegan, Gale Holland and colleagues, Los Angeles Times, "Billions to Spend".
- 2012: Sam Dolnick, The New York Times, "Unlocked: Inside New Jersey’s Halfway Houses".
- 2013: Cynthia Hubert, Phillip Reese and colleagues, The Sacramento Bee, "Nevada Patient Busing".
- 2014: Carol Marbin Miller, Audra D.S. Burch and colleagues, Miami Herald, "Innocents Lost".
- 2015: Cara Fitzpatrick, Lisa Gartner, Michael LaForgia, Nathaniel Lash, Dirk Shadd, Chris Davis and colleagues, Tampa Bay Times, "Failure Factories".
- 2016: Michael J. Berens and Patricia Callahan, Chicago Tribune, "Suffering in Secret".
- 2017: Carol Marbin Miller and Audra D.S. Burch, Miami Herald, "Fight Club".
- 2018: J. David McSwane and Andrew Chavez, The Dallas Morning News, "Pain and Profit".
- 2019: Christopher Weaver, Dan Frosch, Gabe Johnson, Anna Wilde Mathews, Frank Koughan and colleagues, The Wall Street Journal and PBS's Frontline, "Forsaken by the Indian Health Service".
- 2020: Margie Mason and Robin McDowell, Associated Press, "Fruits of Labor".
- 2021: Corey G. Johnson, Rebecca Woolington and Eli Murray, Tampa Bay Times, "Poisoned".
- 2022: Jodi S. Cohen and Jennifer Smith Richards, ProPublica and Chicago Tribune, "The Price Kids Pay".
- 2023: Hannah Dreier, The New York Times, "Alone and Exploited".
- 2024: Kavitha Surana, Lizzie Presser, Cassandra Jaramillo, Stacy Kranitz, ProPublica, "Life of the Mother".
- 2025: Hannah Dreier, The New York Times, “Exposed and Expendable”.

== See also ==
- Barry Bingham, Sr., father of Worth Bingham
- Robert Worth Bingham, Worth's grandfather and namesake
