= Portland Reporter =

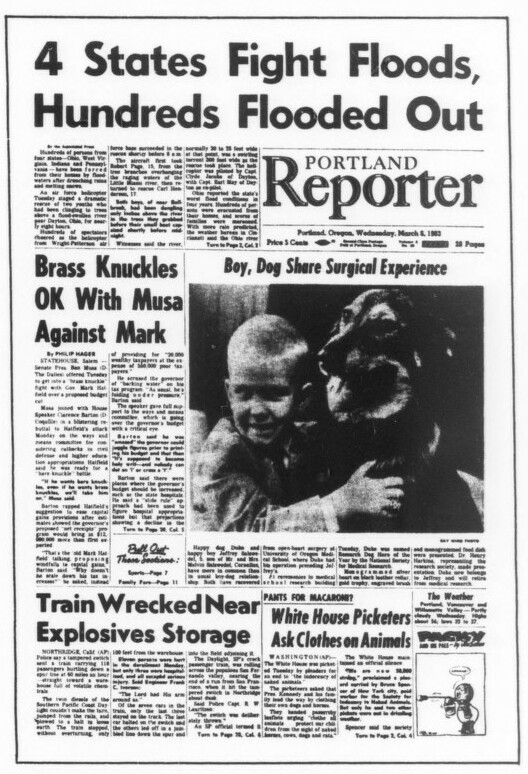
- Front page from March 6, 1963
- Type: Newspaper
- Format: Tabloid
- Owner: Portland Reporting Publishing Company
- Publisher: Michael Frey
- Founded: February 11, 1960
- Ceased publication: October 1, 1964
- City: Portland, Oregon
- Country: U. S. A.
- Circulation: 78,000 (as of March 8, 1963)

The Portland Reporter was a newspaper published in Portland, Oregon, United States in the early 1960s. It was founded by unions, which were calling on Portlanders to cancel their subscriptions to the city's two existing daily newspapers, as a weekly paper. Within a year, with support from various local and national unions, it had begun daily publication. It ceased publication upon the conclusion of the strike.

It was reported to be the first daily newspaper established in a major metropolitan area of the U.S. Pacific Northwest in at least 50 years.

== Origin in newspaper labor dispute ==
In 1948 the Oregonian vacated the Oregonian Building, its home of more than 50 years, and put itself in financial distress in the construction of its new building; this resulted in the sale of the newspaper to S. I. Newhouse in 1950.

What was to become heated four-year strike began against both The Oregonian and The Oregon Journal began in November 1959. The strike was called by Stereotypers Local 49 over various contract issues, particularly the introduction of more automated plate-casting machinery; the new-to-American-publishing German-made equipment required one operator instead of the four that operated the existing equipment. Wallace Turner and other writers and photographers refused to cross the picket lines and never returned.

== Impact ==
The competition and the labor shortage made publication difficult, but not impossible, for the older papers. The Oregonian and the Journal published a "joint, typo-marred paper" for six months until they had hired enough nonunion help to resume separate operations. Newhouse bought the Oregon Journal in 1961. Production and business operations of the two newspapers were consolidated in The Oregonian's building, while their editorial staffs remained separate. The Journal continued as a separate publication (though its Sunday edition ceased) until 1982, when Newhouse merged it with the Oregonian.

The Reporter's circulation peaked at 78,000. The National Labor Relations Board ruled the strike illegal in November 1963. Strikers continued to picket until April 4, 1965, at which point the Oregonian and the Journal became open shops. The Reporter shut down in October 1964.
