= 1957 Pulitzer Prize =

Awards for journalism and related fields

The following are the Pulitzer Prizes for 1957.

== Journalism awards ==
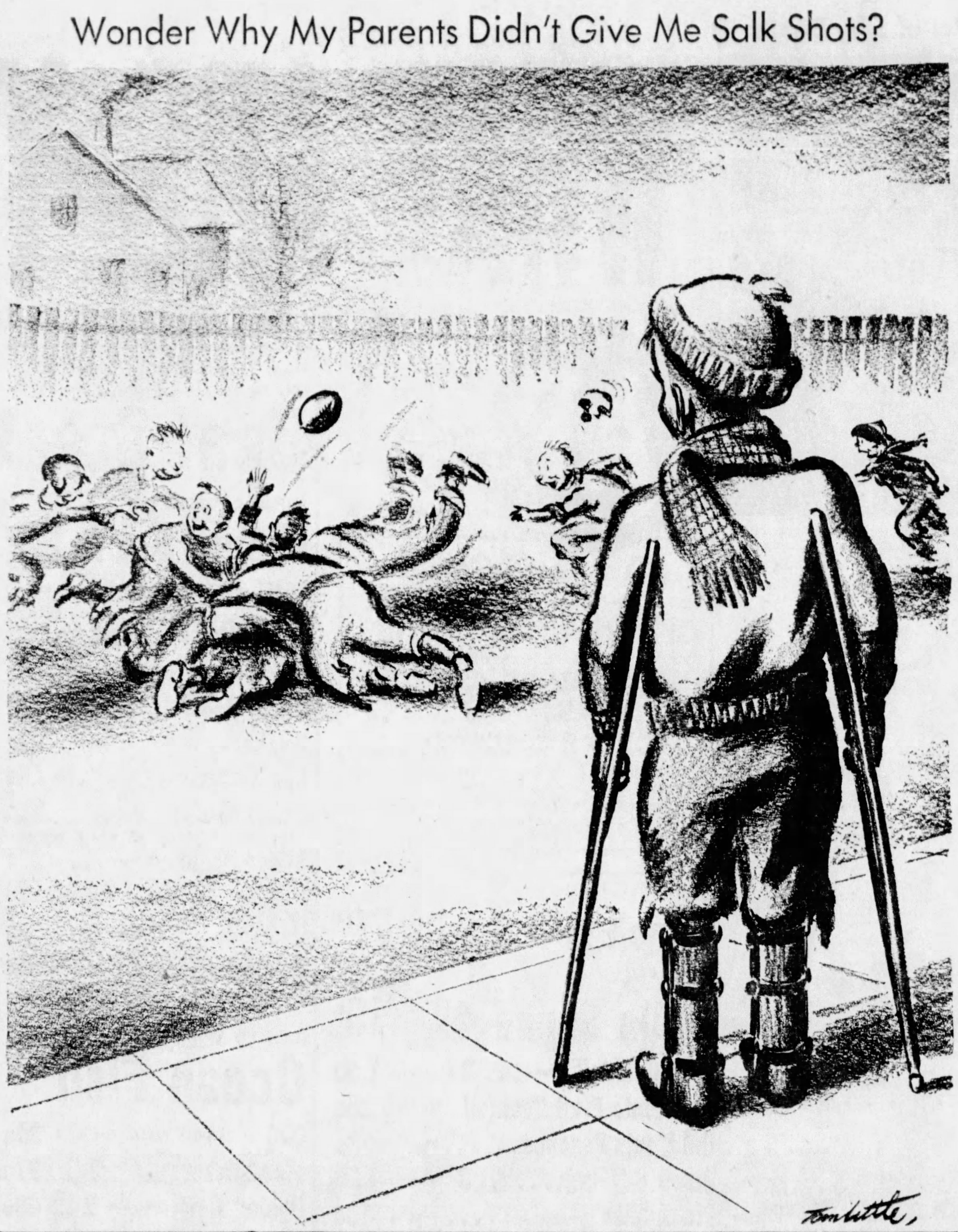
"Wonder Why My Parents Didn't Give Me Salk Shots?", the prize-winning editorial cartoon

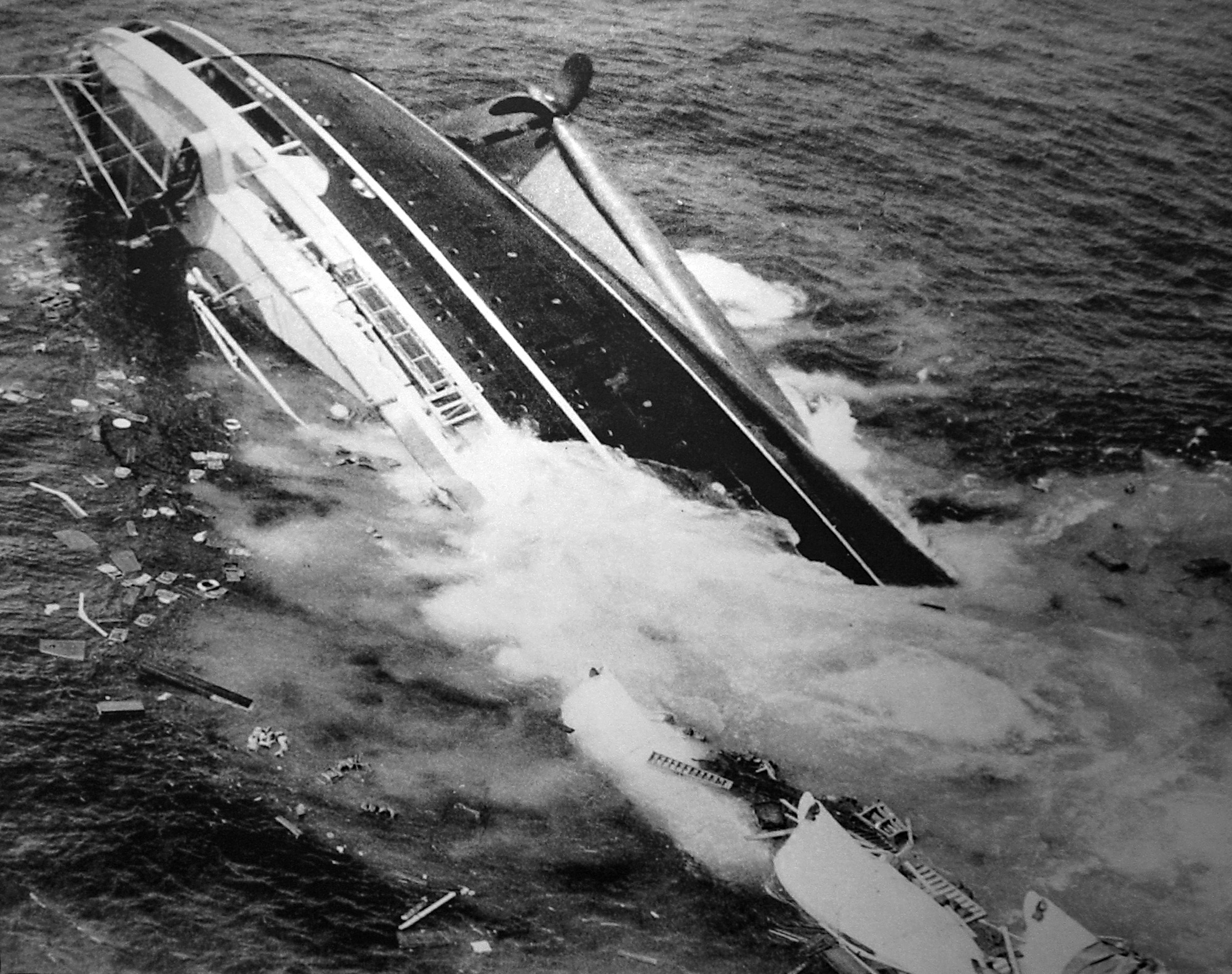
The "key" picture in Trask's prize-winning photographic sequence of the sinking of the Andrea Doria

- Public Service:
  - The Chicago Daily News, for determined and courageous public service in exposing a $6.15 million fraud operating in the office of the State Auditor of Illinois resulting in the indictment, conviction, and imprisonment of State Auditor Orville Hodge and others. This led to an overhaul of State procedures to prevent any recurrence of the fraud.
- Local Reporting, Edition Time:
  - The Salt Lake Tribune, for its prompt and efficient coverage of the crash of two air liners over the Grand Canyon, in which 128 persons were killed. This was a team job that surmounted great difficulties in distance, time and terrain.
- Local Reporting, No Edition Time:
  - Wallace Turner and William Lambert of the Portland Oregonian, for their expose of vice and corruption in Portland involving some municipal officials and officers of the International Brotherhood of Teamsters, Chauffeurs, Warehousemen and Helpers of America, Western Conference. They fulfilled their assignments despite great handicaps and the risk of reprisal from lawless elements.
- National Reporting:
  - James Reston of The New York Times, for his distinguished national correspondence, including both news dispatches and interpretive reporting, an outstanding example of which was his five-part analysis of the effect of President Eisenhower's illness on the functioning of the Executive Branch of the Federal Government.
- International Reporting:
  - Russell Jones of United Press International, for his excellent and sustained coverage of the Hungarian revolt against Communist domination, during which he worked at great personal risk within Russian-held Budapest and gave front-line eyewitness reports of the ruthless Soviet repression of the Hungarian people.
- Editorial Writing:
  - Buford Boone of the Tuscaloosa News, for his fearless and reasoned editorials in a community inflamed by a segregation issue, an outstanding example of his work being the editorial entitled, "What A Price For Peace", published on February 7, 1956.
- Editorial Cartooning:
  - Tom Little of The Nashville Tennessean, for "Wonder Why My Parents Didn't Give Me Salk Shots?", published on January 12, 1956.
- Photography:
  - Harry A. Trask of the Boston Traveler, for his dramatic and outstanding photographic sequence of the sinking of the liner SS Andrea Doria, the pictures being taken from an airplane flying at a height of 75 feet only nine minutes before the ship plunged to the bottom. (The second picture in the sequence is cited as the key photograph.)

== Letters, Drama and Music Awards ==
- Fiction:
  - No award given.
- Drama:
  - Long Day's Journey Into Night by Eugene O'Neill (Yale Univ. Press).
- History:
  - Russia Leaves the War: Soviet-American Relations, 1917-1920 by George F. Kennan (Princeton Univ. Press).
- Biography or Autobiography:
  - Profiles in Courage by John F. Kennedy (Harper).
- Poetry:
  - Things of This World by Richard Wilbur (Harcourt).
- Music:
  - Meditations on Ecclesiastes by Norman Dello Joio (C. Fischer), first performed at the Juilliard School of Music on April 20, 1956.
- Special Citation:
  - Kenneth Roberts, for his historical novels which have long contributed to the creation of greater interest in our early American history.
