= Lisa Chedekel =

- Born: November 19, 1960
- Died: January 12, 2018 (aged 57)
- Education: Wesleyan University
- Occupation: Investigative journalist

Lisa Sharon Chedekel (November 19, 1960 – January 12, 2018) was an American investigative journalist.

== Life and career ==
Chedekel graduated from Wesleyan University in 1982. She attended Phillips Academy in her hometown, Andover, Massachusetts.

At the Hartford Courant in 1998 she was on a team that provided "clear and detailed coverage of a shooting rampage in which a state lottery worker killed four supervisors, then himself," and won the following year's Pulitzer Prize for Breaking News Reporting with that citation.

Still at the Courant in 2006, she wrote stories about military mental health care which won national awards. She and Matthew Kauffman were finalists for the Investigative Reporting Pulitzer, citing "their in-depth reports on suicide among American soldiers in Iraq, leading to congressional and military action to address mental health problems raised in the stories."

In 2002, she was one of a few American journalists to visit and report from Saudi Arabia. In December 2010, she co-founded the Connecticut Health Investigative Team, a non-profit investigative news service focusing on health and safety.

On January 12, 2018, Chedekel died at the age of 57 from cancer, leaving two children, Bernard and Evelyn, and her wife, Isabel Morais.

== Awards ==
- 2007 finalist, Pulitzer Prize for Investigative Reporting
- 2006 George Polk Award
- 2006 Selden Ring Award for Investigative Reporting
- 2006 Worth Bingham Prize
- 1999 Pulitzer Prize for Breaking News Reporting

== Works ==
- Kauffman, Matthew; Chedekel, Lisa (March 9, 2008). "Military Psychiatric Screening Still Lags". Washington Monthly. 40 (4). Archived from the original on May 21, 2011 – via FindArticles.
