= Susan Schmidt =

American journalist

Susan Schmidt is an American investigative reporter with the Wall Street Journal. She is best known for her work at The Washington Post, where she worked from 1983 until leaving for the Wall Street Journal.

== Biography ==
Schmidt received a bachelor's degree in English from Mary Baldwin College in 1975. After college, she became a news assistant at the Washington Star. Later working for the Los Angeles Herald Examiner and the Quincy Mass. Patriot Ledger before joining the Washington Post in 1983.

At the Post, she worked as an editor in the metro desk, a reporter in business news, and joined the national news staff in 1992. In 2002, she won a Pulitzer Prize for reporting on post-9/11 terrorism with Bob Woodward and five other Post reporters. In 2006, Schmidt again shared the Pulitzer Prize for investigative reporting with James V. Grimaldi and R. Jeffrey Smith for their probe into, and exposure of lobbyist Jack Abramoff's corrupt activities. Their stories were published in installments. Her articles triggered prosecutions by the Justice Department that put the lobbyist and other congressional staff members and U.S. officials in federal prison. Schmidt is credited with writing the first story about the Monica Lewinsky investigation, although The Drudge Report leaked the story in the hours before that day's Post was distributed. As newspapers began to scale back investigative reporting in 2009, she left the Wall Street Journal to start a new company with Glenn Simpson to do investigative work for private clients. In addition, they work with the International Assessment and Strategy Center. In April 2009 she and Glenn Simpson left SNS Global and formed Fusion GPS to work for private clients.

Schmidt and her Washington Post co-author Vernon Loeb, along with Baltimore Sun columnist Gary Dorsey, wrote the first stories about the rescue of United States Army Private Jessica Lynch in 2003. The details of the story were later found to be inaccurate and part of a propaganda campaign by The Pentagon. Schmidt's story was debunked by fellow Washington Post reporter Dana Priest.

With Michael Weisskopf, Schmidt is co-author with of Truth at Any Cost: Ken Starr and the Unmaking of Bill Clinton (ISBN 0-06-019485-5), which focuses on Special Prosecutor Kenneth Starr and the Lewinsky scandal.

She is married to Glen Nishimura, the former op-ed editor for USA Today. They have two daughters and live in McLean, VA.

== Writing ==
Truth at Any Cost: Ken Starr and the Unmaking of Bill Clinton. Susan Schmidt and Michael Weisskopf, Harper (2000)

Deadlock: The Inside Story of America's Closest Election. The Political Staff of the Washington Post, PublicAffairs (2001)

Lynch kept firing until she ran out of ammo, The Washington Post (2003)
