= Matthew Kauffman =

American journalist

Matthew Kauffman (born October 5, 1961 in Princeton, New Jersey) is an American investigative journalist and two-time Pulitzer Prize finalist.

== Education ==
Kauffman attended Vassar College, where he obtained a bachelor of arts degree.

== Career ==
Kauffman worked as a legal writer for the Hartford Courant until moving to West Hartford, Connecticut, where he took a job at the business desk. In 2003, Kauffman received accolades for his series on drug company scandals. Then, he wrote a weekly column known as the “Inside Pitch” and monthly reviews on As seen on TV products. After winning Reporter of the Year at the Courant, and twice being a finalist for the Gerald Loeb Award, Kauffman was promoted to the investigative desk. He uncovered questionable ticket deals at the UConn athletic department; the highly paid basketball coaches Jim Calhoun and Geno Auriemma and others were secretly trading tickets for cars.

Kauffman has made an appearance on The O'Reilly Factor, where he talked about the legal, but sleazy, practices of charity executives and the percentage of donations that they keep.

In May 2006, Kauffman, along with colleague Lisa Chedekel, broke the story of mentally unstable soldiers in the U.S. Military being sent to and kept in Iraq. The four-part series, entitled "Mentally Unfit, Forced to Fight", gained national renown. They talked with broadcast, cable, internet, and print journalists about what they found and Kauffman was featured in an evening network newscast—ABC World News Sunday on May 14, 2006. The story won the 2006 Worth Bingham Prize, the George Polk Award, the 2007 Selden Ring Award for Investigative Reporting, the Dart Award for Excellence in Reporting on Victims of Violence, and the Heywood Broun Award. The story was also a finalist for the 2007 Pulitzer Prize for Investigative Reporting.

== Personal life ==
After graduating Vassar, Kauffman married Wendy Nelson Kauffman and moved to New Haven, Connecticut.
