= Carol Marbin Miller =

American investigative journalist

Carol Marbin Miller is a senior investigative reporter at The Miami Herald. Marbin Miller began covering social welfare programs at the St. Petersburg Times in the 1990s. She joined The Miami Herald in 2000 and has reported extensively on Florida's services to children as well as the state's juvenile justice system, programs for people with disabilities, mental health and elder care.

== Education ==
Marbin Miller is a graduate of Florida State University and the Columbia University Graduate School of Journalism.

== Innocents Lost ==
Marbin Miller and colleague Audra D.S. Burch investigated the circumstances of the deaths of 477 children in the care of Florida’s DCF for a six-year period from January 1, 2008 to December 31, 2013. The series, Innocents Lost, "chronicles the sad procession of children who died, often violently, after the Florida Department of Children and Families had been warned, often repeatedly, that they or their siblings could be in danger." Their project produced an extensive searchable database that details the children's cases including specific information about their circumstances and the systemic failures that led to their deaths. The series is cited as the precipitating factor for the most extensive overhaul of child welfare laws in the history of the state.

According to the Neiman Foundation for Journalism at Harvard University, "the deaths occurred as Florida reduced the number of children in foster care at the same time it cut services for troubled families." The Poynter Institute for Media Studies discussed the series at length on its website.

== Awards ==
The University of Southern California’s Annenberg School for Communication and Journalism selected Marbin Miller for the 2015 Selden Ring Award for Investigative Reporting. Other awards include:

- Gene Miller Voice of Freedom Award presented by the Florida Action Committee to recognize great journalism in civil liberties.
- James Batten Award for Public Service for "Innocents Lost" with the judges commenting that “The Miami Herald’s ‘Innocents Lost’ was "watchdog journalism at its absolute best.”
- 30th Annual Joseph L. Brechner Freedom of Information Award.
- Paul Hansell Award for Distinguished Achievement in Florida Journalism. The award cited the body of work that included “Bitter Pill,” a series which examined how frail and medically complex children were purged from a taxpayer funded healthcare program to save money.
- First Amendment Foundation Freedom of Information Award given by the Florida Society of Professional Journalists.
- NewsGuild-Communications Workers of America's Heywood Broun Award.
- The Society of Professional Journalists' Eugene S. Pulliam First Amendment Award.
- Goldsmith Prize for Investigative Reporting from the Shorenstein Center
- Worth Bingham Prize for Investigative Journalism from the Nieman Foundation for Journalism. The Worth Bingham Prize announcement also cited the Miami Herald's Tallahassee bureau chief Mary Ellen Klas; data visualization specialist Lazaro Gamio; photographer and videographer Emily Michot; artist/page designer Ana Lense Larrauri and page designer Kara Dapena.

Along with Michael Sallah and Rob Barry, Marbin Miller was a finalist for the 2012 Pulitzer Prize for Public Service for the Miami Herald series, "Neglected to Death", for the project's exposure of deadly abuses and lax state oversight in Florida's assisted living facilities for the elderly and mentally ill that resulted in the closure of dangerous homes, punishment of violators and creation of tougher laws and regulations."

"Innocents Lost" won the Knight Award for Public Service by the Online News Association as well as the Associated Press Managing Editors' 45th Annual Public Service Award and the contest's Best of Show Award.

In July 2015, "Innocents Lost" won the Gold Medal for Public Service of the Florida Society of News Editors (FSNE) journalism contest. Among newspapers with a circulation of 125,000 or more in the FSNE, Burch and Marbin Miller finished first in the category of Community Leadership.

List of awards for "Innocents Lost" printed in the Miami Herald.
