= Wallace Turner =

American journalist and government administrator

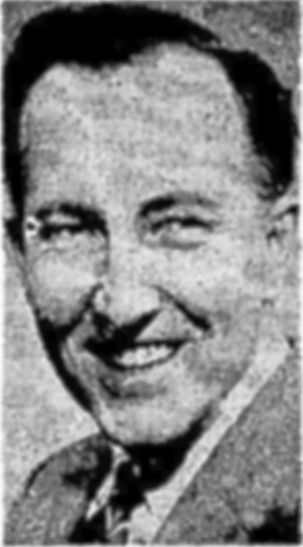
- Born: March 15, 1921; Titusville, Florida
- Died: September 18, 2010 (aged 89); Springfield, Oregon
- Occupations: Newspaper writer Newspaper editor
- Notable credit(s): The Oregonian; The New York Times
- Spouse: Pearl

Wallace Turner (March 15, 1921 – September 18, 2010) was an American journalist and government administrator. A native of Florida, he won a Pulitzer Prize in 1957 while working for The Oregonian in Portland, Oregon. Turner later worked in the administration of President John F. Kennedy before returning to the newspaper business where he worked for The New York Times.

== Early life ==
Turner was born on March 15, 1921, to Clyde H. and Ina Belle (née Wallace) Turner in Titusville, Florida, and raised in The Ozarks region in Missouri. He was one of three brothers in the family. After earning a bachelor's degree in journalism in 1943 from the University of Missouri, he was married in June and then briefly joined the United States Army during World War II. That year he also started in the newspaper business, working for the Springfield News in Springfield, Missouri.

Wallace was discharged from the Army due to his asthma, and he and his new wife moved to Oregon, his wife Pearl Burk's home state. In 1943, they settled in Portland, Oregon, where he took a job as the night police reporter for the Daily Oregonian.

== Newspaper career ==
While working for The Oregonian, Oregon's largest daily newspaper, he won his first of two Heywood Broun Awards in 1952 for his work helping expose a scam on the Oregon Coast that targeted Native Americans and their land and involved the Bureau of Indian Affairs. In 1957, Turner was awarded the Pulitzer Prize for Investigative Reporting along with fellow Oregonian reporter William Lambert. The two writers uncovered widespread corruption in the local government that involved labor union officials, which helped lead to investigations into organized crime across the country. Turner even testified in 1957 before the U.S. Senate's Select Committee on Improper Activities in the Labor or Management Field, commonly known as the McClellan Committee, concerning the corruption.

Turner then went to Harvard University on a Nieman Fellowship for a year after winning the Pulitzer. Turner left The Oregonian in 1959 to become the news director at Portland television station KPTV. He then left the station in 1961 to work as an Assistant Secretary of the Department of Health, Education and Welfare (HEW) in the administration of President John F. Kennedy. He served as an assistant secretary until 1962 when he became the press secretary to the Secretary of the Department of Health, Education and Welfare, Abraham Ribicoff. Later that year he returned to journalism and worked for The New York Times.

With The Times, Wallace worked as a correspondent in their San Francisco bureau from 1962 to 1970, and then as the bureau chief their from 1970 until 1985. While in San Francisco he covered the shootings of Harvey Milk and George Moscone. Turner left San Francisco in 1985 to open The Times' new Seattle news bureau. He continued in that capacity until his retirement in 1988.

Turner was the author of two books: Gamblers' Money — the New Force in American Life, published in 1965, followed by The Mormon Establishment in 1966.

== Death and family ==
After leaving The New York Times he returned to Oregon where he settled in the Eugene area. Wallace Turner died on September 18, 2010, in Springfield, Oregon, at the age of 89 from medical complications associated with old age. With his wife Pearl, he had two daughters, Kathleen and Elizabeth.

== See also ==
- Terry Schrunk
- United States Senate Select Committee on Improper Activities in Labor and Management
