= The Oregonian =

Daily newspaper published in Portland, Oregon

- Front page of The Oregonian, October 17, 2025
- Type: Daily newspaper
- Format: Broadsheet
- Owner: Advance Publications
- Publisher: Oregonian Media Group
- Editor: Laura Gunderson
- Staff writers: 288/75 (full-time/part-time)
- Founded: 1850; 176 years ago
- Headquarters: 1500 SW First Avenue; Portland, Oregon; 97201
- Circulation: 29,325 Average print circulation
- ISSN: 8750-1317
- OCLC number: 9278915
- Website: oregonlive.com

The Oregonian is a daily newspaper based in Portland, Oregon, United States, owned by Advance Publications. It is the oldest continuously published newspaper on the U.S. West Coast, founded as a weekly by Thomas J. Dryer on December 4, 1850, and published daily since 1861. It is the largest newspaper in Oregon and the second largest in the Pacific Northwest by circulation. It is one of the few newspapers with a statewide focus in the United States. The Sunday edition is published under the title The Sunday Oregonian. The regular edition was published under the title The Morning Oregonian from 1861 until 1937.

The Oregonian received the 2001 Pulitzer Prize for Public Service, the only gold medal annually awarded by the organization. The paper's staff or individual writers have received seven other Pulitzer Prizes, most recently the award for Editorial Writing in 2014.

In late 2013, home delivery was reduced to Wednesday, Friday, Saturday, and Sunday, while retaining print copies daily through news stands/newsracks. In January 2024, Monday, Tuesday, and Thursday print editions were discontinued.

== History ==
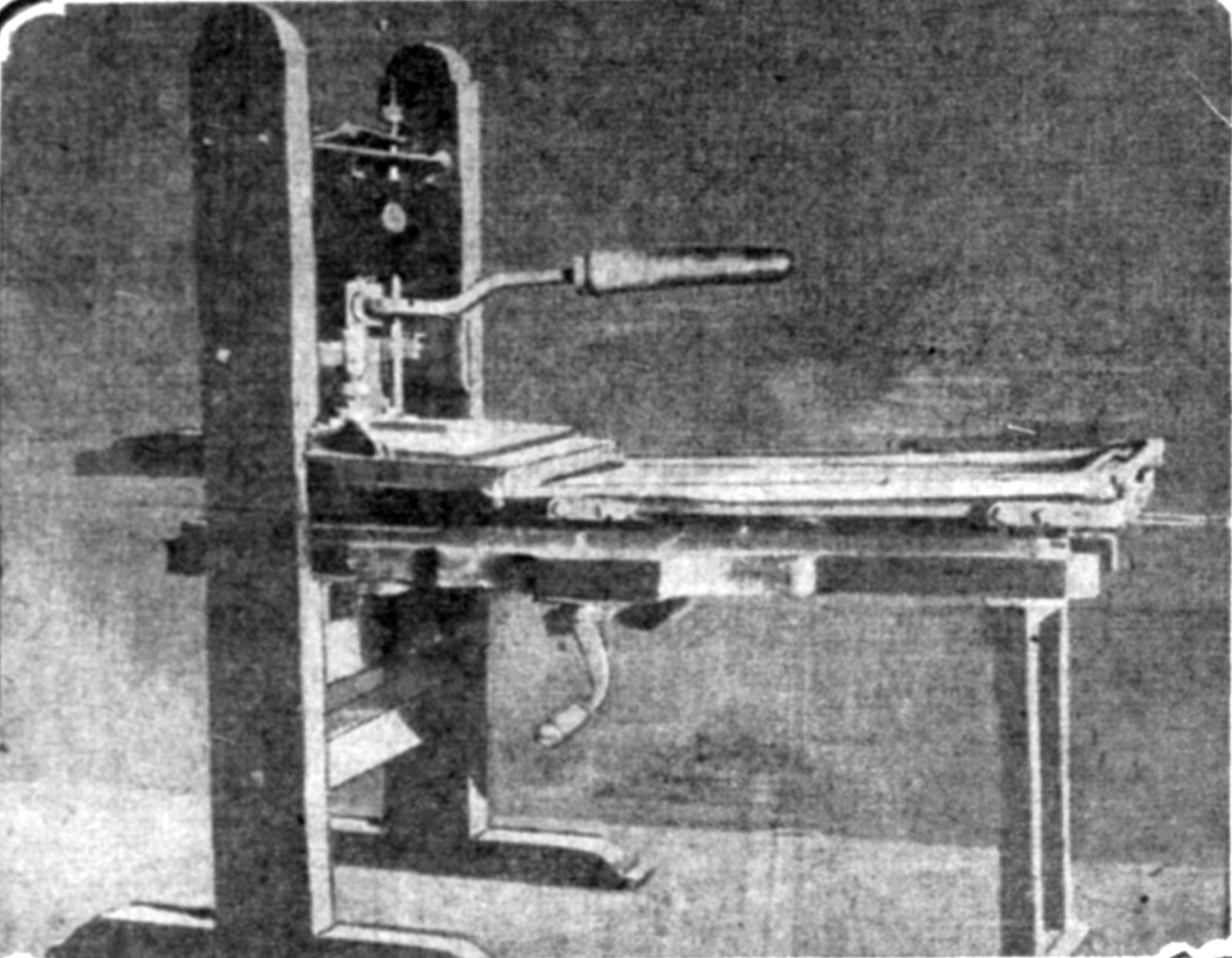
Ramage press used to print the first Oregonian

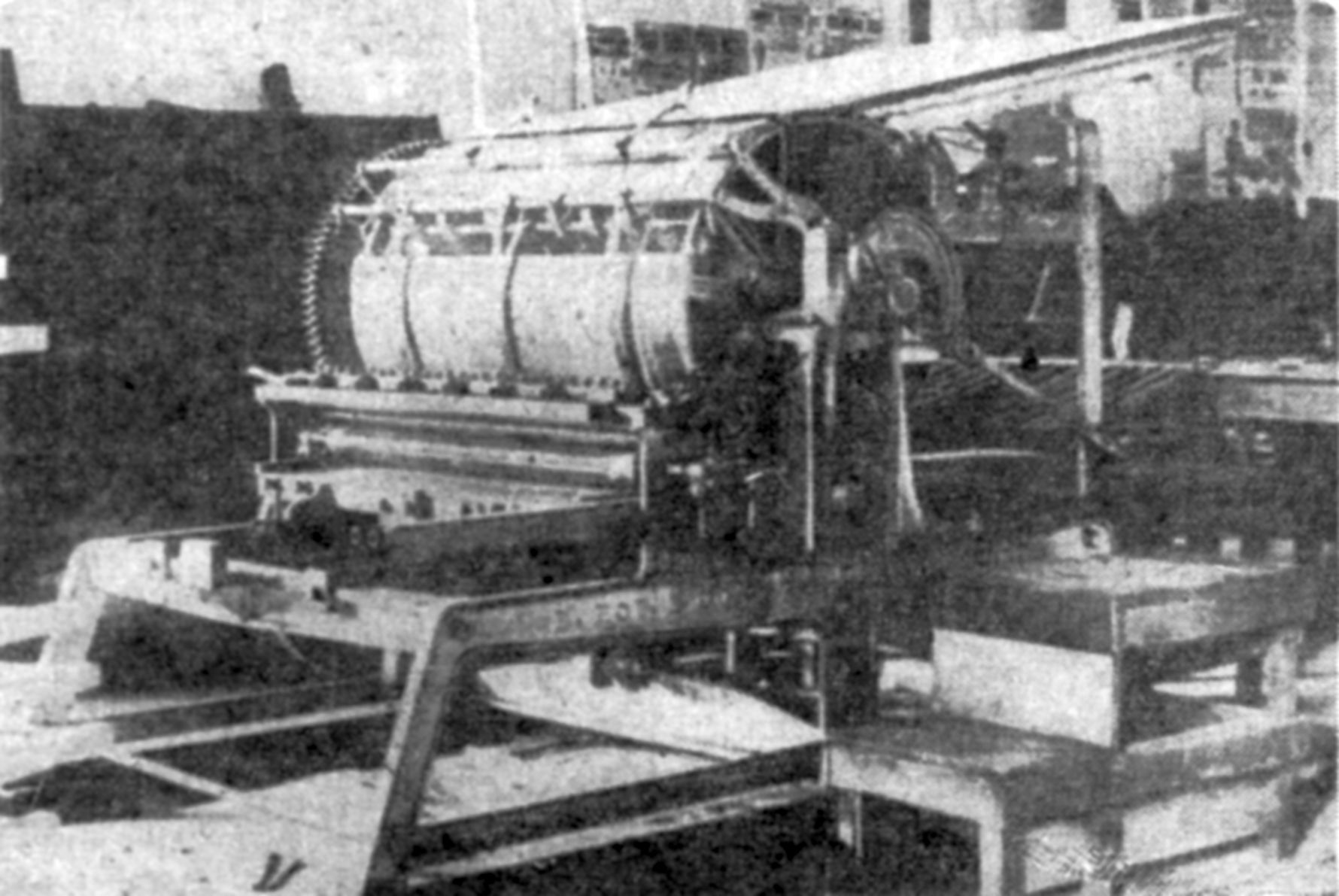
First steam press used by the Oregonian, installed in 1862 (more than a year after the advent of a daily edition), and used until 1871. Subsequently used by the Hillsboro Argus until at least 1911.

=== Establishment ===
One year prior to the incorporation of the tiny town of Portland, Oregon, in 1851, prospective leaders of the new community determined to establish a local newspaper—an institution which was seen as a prerequisite for urban growth. Chief among these pioneer community organizers seeking establishment of a Portland press were Col. W.W. Chapman and prominent local businessman Henry W. Corbett. In the fall of 1850, Chapman and Corbett traveled to San Francisco, at the time far and away the largest city on the west coast of the United States, in search of an editor interested in and capable of producing a weekly newspaper in Portland. There the pair met Thomas J. Dryer, a transplanted New Yorker who was an energetic writer with both printing equipment and previous experience in the production of a small circulation community newspaper in his native Ulster County, New York.

==== First weekly issues ====
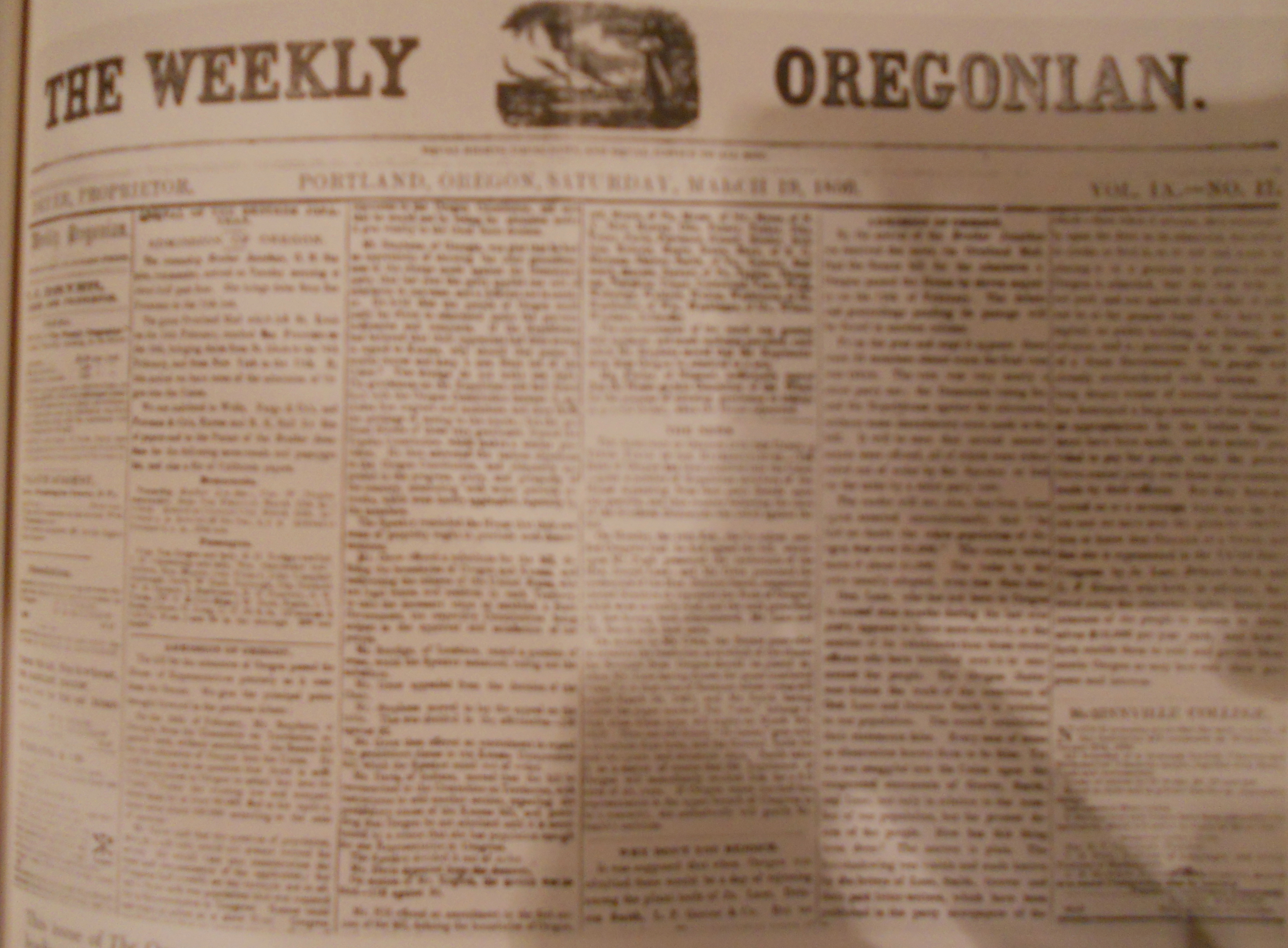
The Weekly Oregonian front page on March 19, 1859

Dryer's press was transported to Portland and it was there on December 4, 1850, that the first issue of The Weekly Oregonian found its readers. Each weekly issue consisted of four pages, printed six columns wide. Little attention was paid to current news events, with the bulk of the paper's content devoted to political themes and biographical commentary. The paper took a staunch political line supportive of the Whig Party—an orientation which soon brought it into conflict with The Statesman, a Democratic paper launched at Oregon City not long after The Weekly Oregonian's debut. A loud and bitter rivalry between the competing news organs ensued.

=== 1860s–1870s ===
==== Pittock era ====
Henry Pittock became the owner in 1861 as compensation for unpaid wages, and he began publishing the paper daily, except Sundays. Pittock's goal was to focus more on news than the bully pulpit established by Dryer. He ordered a new press in December 1860 and also arranged for the news to be sent by telegraph to Redding, California, then by stagecoach to Jacksonville, Oregon, and then by pony express to Portland.

==== Scott era ====
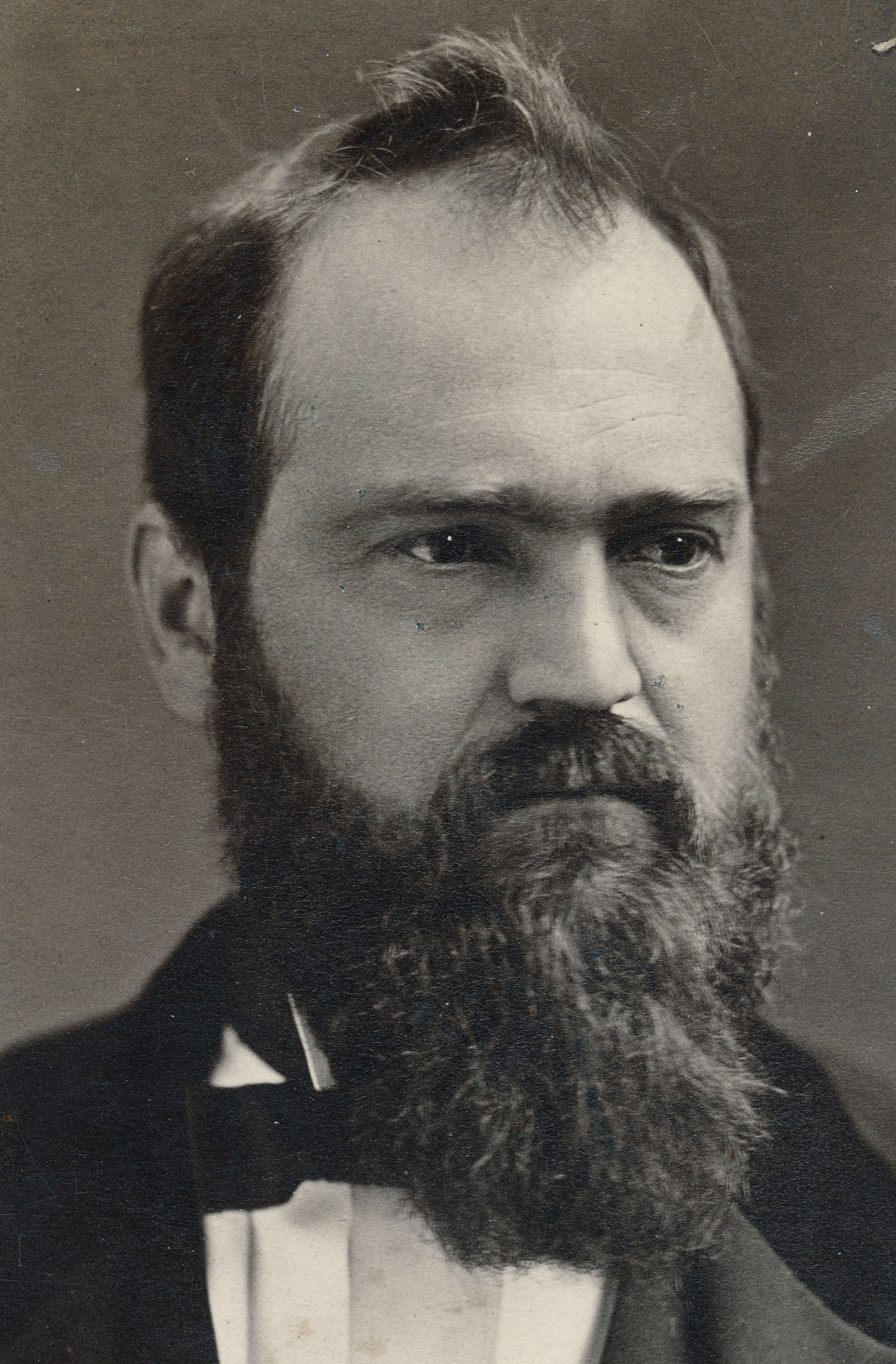
Harvey W. Scott as he appeared in the 1870s

From 1866 to 1872 Harvey W. Scott was the editor. Henry W. Corbett bought the paper from a cash-poor Pittock in October 1872 and placed William Lair Hill as editor. Scott, fired by Corbett for supporting Ben Holladay's candidates, became editor of Holladay's rival Portland Daily Bulletin. The paper went out of print in 1876, Holladay having lost $200,000 in the process. Corbett sold The Oregonian back to Pittock in 1877, marking a return of Scott to the paper's editorial helm. A part-owner of the paper, Scott would remain as editor-in-chief until shortly before his death in 1910.

=== 1880s–1890s ===
One of the journalists who began his career on The Oregonian during this time period was James J. Montague who took over and wrote the column "Slings & Arrows" until he was hired away by William Randolph Hearst in 1902. In this time period Governor Sylvester Pennoyer prominently criticized the Oregonian for calling for vigilante "justice" against Chinese Americans (Pennoyer favored running people of Chinese descent out of the state by "legal" means). The West Shore criticized the Oregonian for its sensationalized coverage of the English monarchy.

==== Sunday Oregonian ====
In 1881, the first Sunday Oregonian was published. The paper became known as the voice of business-oriented Republicans, as evidenced by consistent endorsement of Republican candidates for president in every federal election before 1992.

==== New location ====
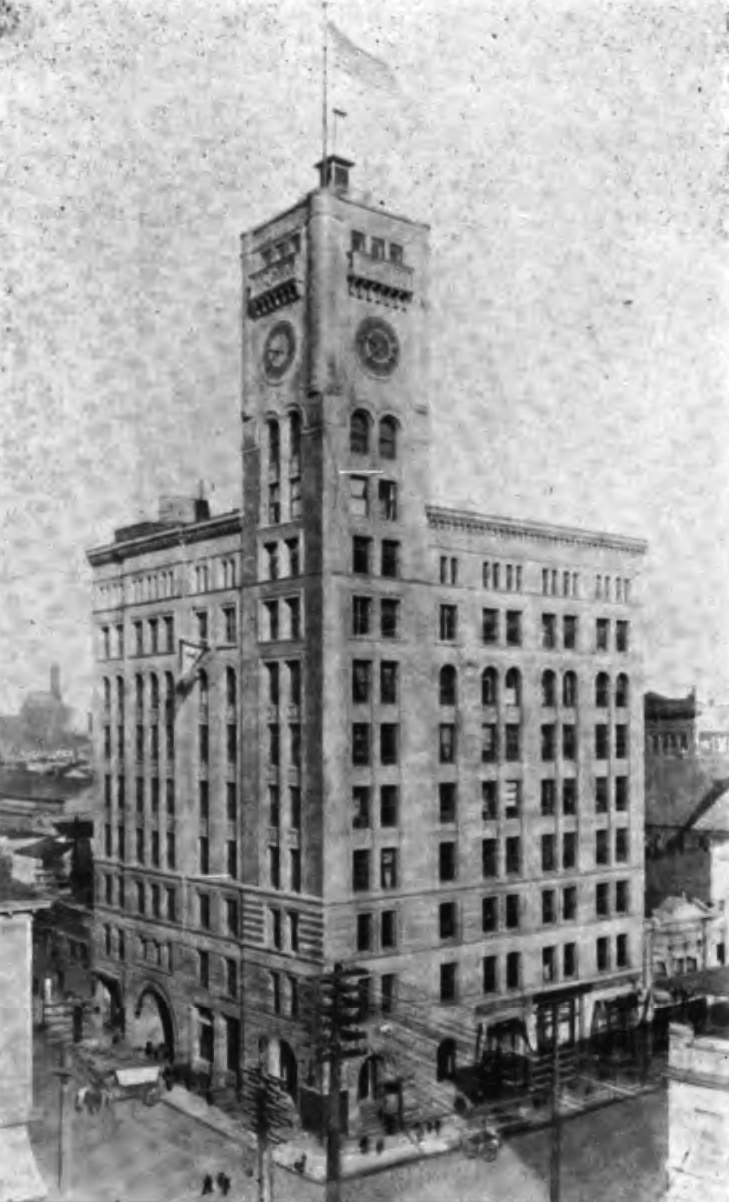
The Oregonian Building of 1892 was the paper's home until 1948. It was demolished in 1950.

The paper's offices and presses were originally housed in a two-story building at the intersection of First Street (now First Avenue) and Morrison Street, but in 1892 the paper moved into a new nine-story building at 6th and Alder streets. The new building was, the same as its predecessor (and successor), called the Oregonian Building. It included a clock tower at one corner, and the building's overall height of 194 to 196 feet (around 59 m) made it the tallest structure in Portland, a distinction it retained until the completion of the Yeon Building in 1911. It contained about 100,000 square feet (9,300 m^{2}) of floor space, including the basement but not the tower. The newspaper did not move again until 1948. The 1892 building was demolished in 1950.

=== 1900s–1940s ===
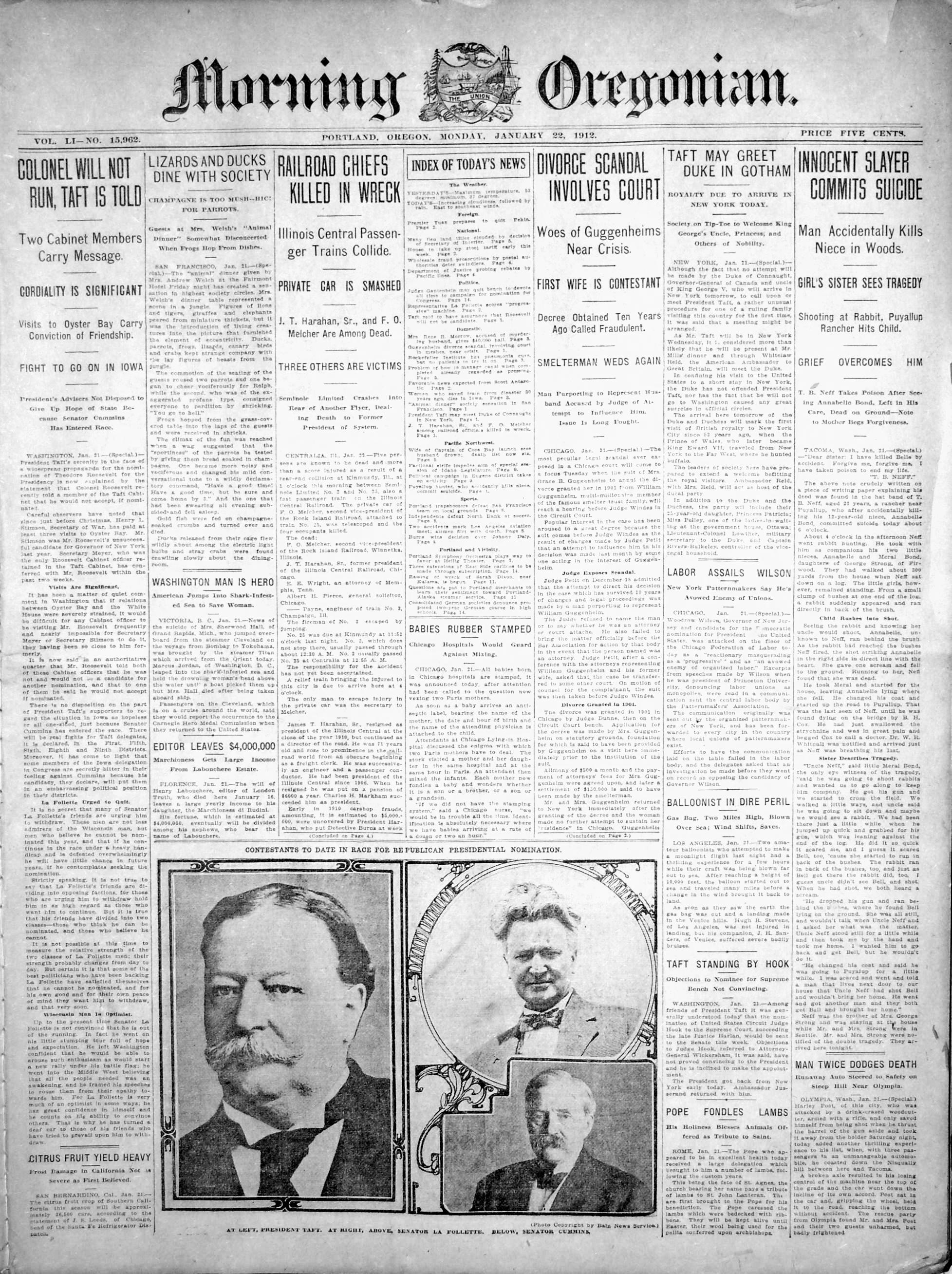
The Morning Oregonian, January 22, 1912

Following the death of Harvey Scott in 1910, the paper's editor-in-chief was Edgar B. Piper, who had previously been managing editor. Piper remained editor until his death in 1928.

The Oregonian's first female journalist, Louise Bryant, joined the paper around 1909.

==== The Morning Oregonian and KGW ====
In 1922, the Oregonian discontinued its weekly edition, and launched KGW, Oregon's first commercial radio station. Five years later, KGW affiliated with NBC (1927). The newspaper purchased a second station, KEX, in 1933, from NBC subsidiary Northwest Broadcasting Co. In 1944, KEX was sold to Westinghouse Radio Stations, Inc. The Oregonian launched KGW-FM, the Northwest's first FM station, in 1946 (acclaimed by "The Oregonian" May 8, 1946), known today as KKRZ. KGW and KGW-FM were sold to King Broadcasting Co in 1953.

In 1937, The Morning Oregonian shortened its name to The Oregonian. Two years later, associate editor Ronald G. Callvert received a Pulitzer Prize for editorial reporting for "distinguished editorial writing...as exemplified by the editorial entitled "My Country 'Tis of Thee".

A 20-year trust under which the Oregonian was conducted expired in 1939. O. L. Price, who managed the newspaper under the trust, retired at age 61 upon its expiration. Ownership reverted to the heirs of Pittock and H. W. Scott.

==== Move in 1948 ====
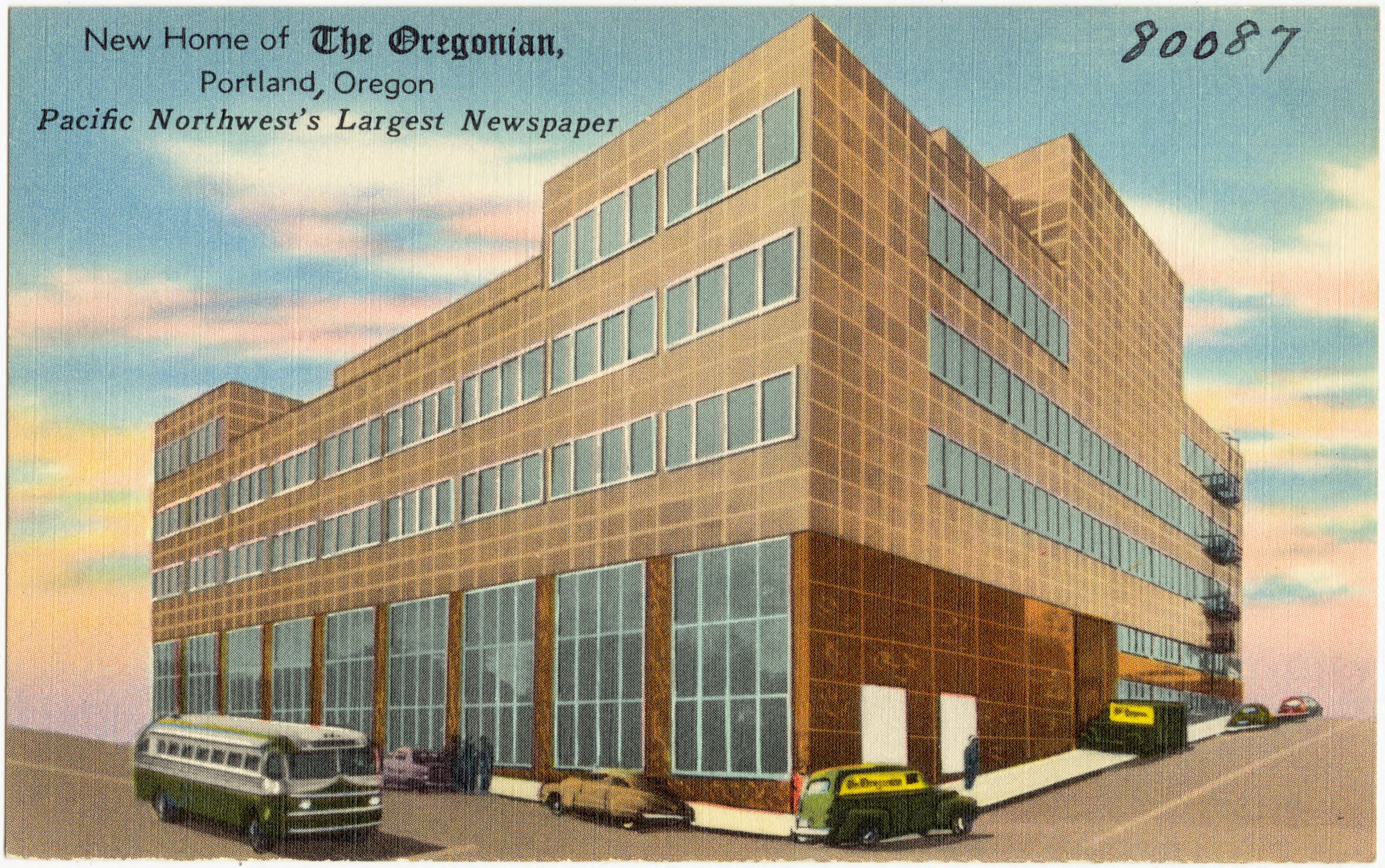
Postcard of the new home of The Oregonian, corner of 6th & Jefferson

In 1948, the paper moved to a new location within downtown, where its headquarters ultimately would remain for the next 66 years, on SW Broadway between Jefferson Street and Columbia Street. The new building was designed by Pietro Belluschi and again was named the Oregonian Building. The block was previously home to the William S. Ladd mansion, which had been demolished around 1925. Circa 1946, The Oregonian purchased the block for $100,000, which led to complaints from paper editor Leslie M. Scott because of the outrageous price. Three years later, Scott purchased a nearby block for the state at $300,000 while holding the office of Oregon State Treasurer.

The new Oregonian building was to contain the KGW radio station and a television studio, as well as a large and opulent dining room. The contractor was L. H. Hoffman, who was under a very profitable cost-plus contract. Aside from the "extravagance of design", construction materials were in short supply, the nation was under heavy inflation, and Belluschi's plans were never ready, leading to massive costs. The Oregonian had to borrow from banks, the first time in over 50 years. New company president E. B. MacNaughton was forced to exhaust the company's loan limits at First National Bank, then turn to the Bank of America. MacNaughton then eliminated an extra elevator, the dining room, and KGW's radio and television studios. The building still cost $4 million, twice the original estimate.

The building opened in 1948, but The Oregonian had to sell it to Connecticut Mutual Life Insurance Company for $3.6 million in a leaseback arrangement. Further financial issues led to the 1950 sale to Samuel Newhouse.

=== 1950s–1960s ===
In 1950, Advance Publications founder S. I. "Si" Newhouse purchased the paper. At that time, the sale price of $5.6 million was the largest for a single newspaper. The sale was announced on December 11, 1950. In 1954, Newhouse bought 50% of Mount Hood Radio & Television Broadcasting Corp, which broadcasts KOIN-TV, Portland's first VHF television station, KOIN AM (now KUFO), and KOIN-FM (now KXL-FM). The Oregonian's circulation in 1950 was 214,916; that of the rival Oregon Journal was 190,844.

In 1957, staff writers William Lambert and Wallace Turner were awarded that year's Pulitzer Prize for Pulitzer Prize for Local Reporting - No Edition time. Their prize cited "their expose of vice and corruption in Portland involving some municipal officials and officers of the International Brotherhood of Teamsters, Chauffeurs, Warehousemen and Helpers of America, Western Conference" and noted that "they fulfilled their assignments despite great handicaps and the risk of reprisal from lawless elements."

==== The Oregon Journal ====
What was to become a long and heated strike began against both The Oregonian and The Oregon Journal began in November 1959. The strike was called by Stereotypers Local 49 over various contract issues, particularly the introduction of more automated plate-casting machinery; the new-to-American-publishing German-made equipment required one operator instead of the four that operated the existing equipment. Wallace Turner and many other writers and photographers refused to cross the picket lines and never returned. The two newspapers published a "joint, typo-marred paper" for six months until they had hired enough nonunion help to resume separate operations. Starting in February 1960, striking union workers published a daily newspaper, The (Portland) Reporter; its circulation peaked at 78,000, but was shut down in October 1964.

In 1961, Newhouse bought The Oregon Journal, Portland's afternoon daily newspaper. Production and business operations of the two newspapers were consolidated in The Oregonian's building, while their editorial staffs remained separate. The National Labor Relations Board ruled the strike illegal in November 1963. Strikers continued to picket until April 4, 1965, at which point the two newspapers became open shops.

=== Late 1960s–early 1980s ===
In 1967, Fred Stickel came to The Oregonian from New Jersey to become general manager of the paper; he became president in 1972 and publisher in 1975.

As part of a larger corporate plan to exit broadcasting, The Oregonian sold KOIN-TV to newspaper owner Lee Enterprises in 1977. At the same time, KOIN-AM and -FM were sold to Gaylord Broadcasting Co. Since S. I. Newhouse died in 1979, S.I. Jr. has managed the magazines, and Donald oversees the newspapers.

The Oregonian lost its primary "competitor" and Portland became a one-daily-newspaper city in 1982, when Advance/Newhouse shut down the Journal, citing declining advertising revenues.

=== 1985 ===
The Oregonian published a twenty-part series on the Rajneeshpuram, a religious community that established itself in Antelope, Oregon.

=== Late 1980s ===
==== Hilliard era ====
William A. Hilliard was named editor in 1987, and was the paper's first African-American editor. A resident of Oregon since the age of 8, Hilliard had already worked at The Oregonian for 35 years; he had been city editor starting in 1971 and executive editor since 1982.

==== 1989 ====
The Oregonian established an Asia bureau in Tokyo, Japan in 1989.

Also in 1989, The Oregonian endorsed a Democratic candidate for president for the first time in its history when it supported Bill Clinton in 1992.

=== 1990s ===
The year 1993 was an eventful year for The Oregonian. Robert M. Landauer, then editorial page editor, was a finalist for the Pulitzer Prize in Editorial Writing for "a bold campaign to defuse myths and prejudice promoted by an anti-homosexual constitutional amendment, which was subsequently defeated", according to the Pulitzer judges. The integrity of The Oregonian became the subject of national coverage when The Washington Post broke the story of inappropriate sexual advances which led to the resignation of Oregon senator Bob Packwood four years later. This prompted some to joke, "If it matters to Oregonians, it's in the Washington Post" (a twist on the Oregonian's slogan "If it matters to Oregonians, it's in The Oregonian). Finally, Newhouse appointed a new editor for the paper, Sandra Rowe, who relocated from The Virginian-Pilot.

Business has everything—power, influence, sex, drama—and our job is to pull back the curtain: That bank merger last week? Who got screwed? Who came out on top? This is what really happened. Business news should be handled as finely crafted drama; it's got substance and great meaning. Business should be the backbone of the newspaper.

— Sandy Rowe, from AJR in 1999

==== Rowe era ====
Sandra Rowe joined the paper as executive editor in June 1993. She formally became editor in 1994 with the retirement of William Hilliard, but Hilliard had effectively already given her control of the editor's reins in 1993 as he focused his attention on his duties as the newly elected president of the American Society of Newspaper Editors for 1993–94, in his final year before retirement.

According to Editor & Publisher, soon after Rowe's arrival, she introduced organizational changes to the newsroom. Instead of having a large number of general assignment reporters, she organized them around teams, many of which often develop "subject expertise" that "reflect[s] the interests of readers, not traditional newsroom boundaries." Examples (over the years) include "Northwest Issues and Environment", "Living In the '90s"/"How We Live", "Politics and Accountability", "Health, Science, and Medicine", "Sustainability and Growth", and "Higher Education". Accompanying the reorganization was a more bottom-up approach to identifying stories: "instead of having an assignment-driven newspaper, you have the beat reporters coming to editors with what is going on", with the team editors responsible for deciding what stories were covered by their teams.

The position of public editor was established at The Oregonian in 1993, and Robert Caldwell was appointed. Michele McLellan assumed the role three years later, and was delegated the authority to decide whether or not a newspaper error should result in the publication of a correction.

=== Pulitzer Prize ===
Staff writer Richard Read won the 1999 Pulitzer Prize for Explanatory Reporting, for a series, "The French Fry Connection". The articles illustrated the impact of the 1997 Asian financial crisis by following a case of french fries from a Washington-state farm to a McDonald's in Singapore, ending in Indonesia during riots that led to the Fall of Suharto. The newsroom celebrated The Oregonian's first Pulitzer in 42 years with champagne, McDonald's french fries and a brass band. The series also received the Overseas Press Club award for best business reporting from abroad, the Scripps Howard Foundation award for business reporting and the Blethen award for enterprise reporting.

Co-worker Tom Hallman Jr. was a finalist for the 1999 Pulitzer Prize in Feature Writing, for his "unique profile of a man struggling to recover from a brain injury". Reporter Mark O'Keefe won an Overseas Press Club award for human rights reporting. The editors of Columbia Journalism Review recognized The Oregonian as number twelve on its list of "America's Best Newspapers", and the best newspaper owned by the Newhouse family.

=== 2000s ===
In 2000, The Oregonian was a finalist for the Pulitzer Prize for Breaking News Reporting for its coverage of an environmental disaster created when the New Carissa, a freighter that carried nearly 400,000 gallons of heavy fuel, ran aground February 4, 1999, north of Coos Bay, Oregon. The articles detailed "how fumbling efforts of official agencies failed to contain the far-reaching damage", according to the Pulitzer jury. That same year reporters Brent Walth and Alex Pulaski were finalists for the Pulitzer Prize in Explanatory Writing for their series on political influences in pesticide regulation.

==== Pulitzer Prize for Public Service ====
The Oregonian and news staff were acknowledged with two Pulitzer Prizes in 2001. The paper was awarded the Pulitzer Prize for Public Service, for its "detailed and unflinching examination of systematic problems within the U.S. Immigration and Naturalization Service, including harsh treatment of foreign nationals and other widespread abuses, which prompted various reforms." The series was reported and written by Kim Christensen, Richard Read, Julie Sullivan-Springhetti and Brent Walth, with editorials by the editorial board.

Staff writer Tom Hallman Jr. received the 2001 Pulitzer Prize for Feature Writing for his series, "The Boy Behind the Mask", on a teen with a facial deformity.

In 2003, music critic David Stabler was a finalist for the Pulitzer Prize in Feature Writing for "his sensitive, sometimes surprising chronicle of a teenage prodigy's struggle with a musical talent that proved to be both a gift and a problem". Michael Arrieta-Walden became public editor in 2003; when he ended his three-year term in the position, no successor was named.

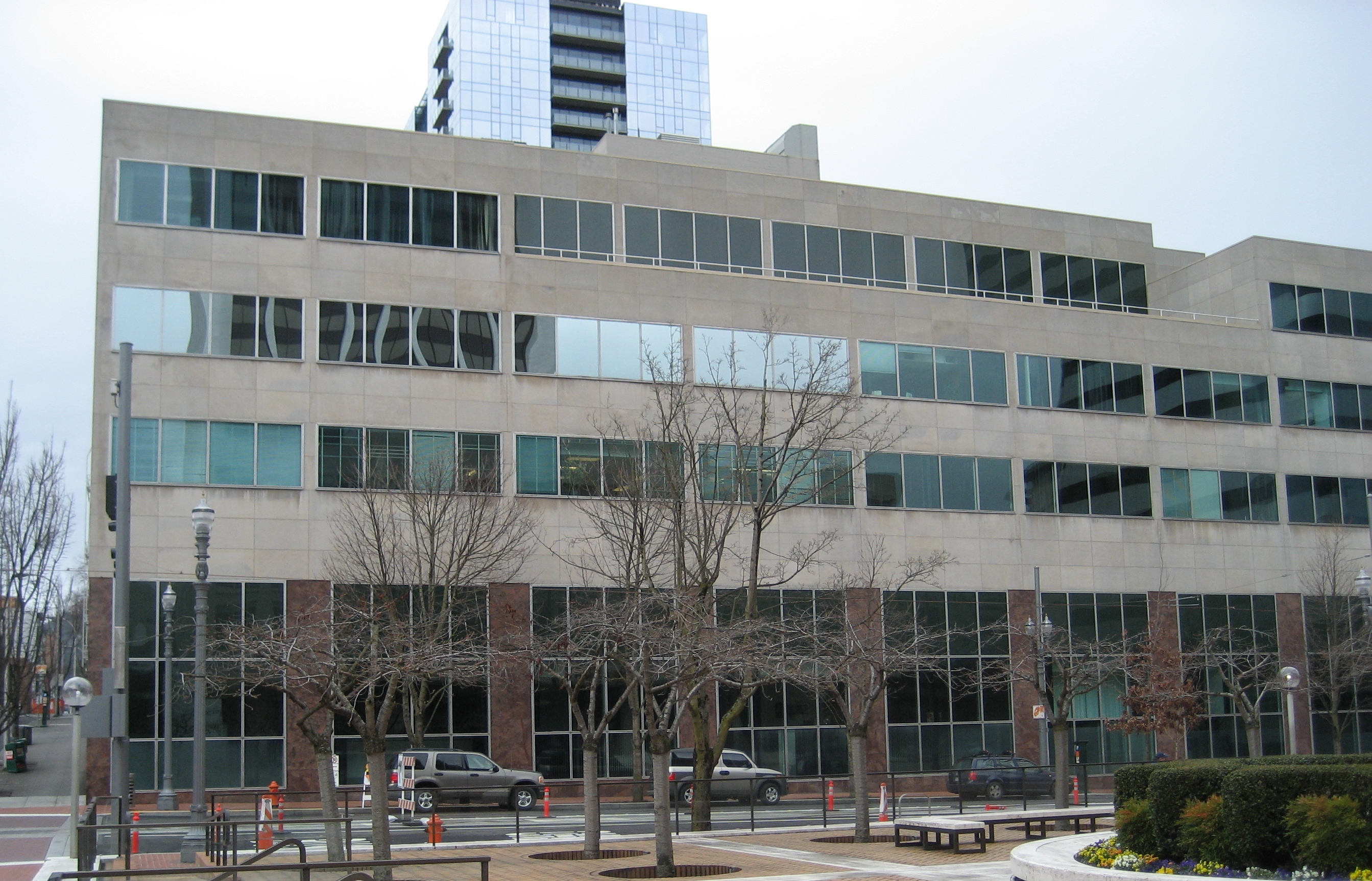
The Oregonian Building of 1948, which occupies a full city block in downtown Portland, housed the paper's headquarters from 1948 to 2014.

==== 2004 criticism ====
In 2004 the paper faced criticism after a headline characterized a 1970s sexual relationship between then-mayor Neil Goldschmidt and a 14-year-old girl as an "affair", rather than statutory rape.

The paper endorsed a Democrat for president for the second time in its 150-year history when it backed John Kerry for president in 2004.

==== 2005–2006 ====
In 2005, staff reporters Steve Suo and Erin Hoover Barnett were finalists for the Pulitzer Prize for National Reporting for "their groundbreaking reports on the failure to curtail the growing illicit use of methamphetamines". That same year, Americans United for Palestinian Human Rights published two reports on The Oregonian, claiming the paper under-reported Palestinian deaths in its news stories of the Israeli/Palestinian conflict and excluded the Palestinian narrative in its Opinion Pages.

Editorial writers Doug Bates and Rick Attig were awarded the 2006 Pulitzer Prize for Editorial Writing for their editorials on the conditions at the Oregon State Hospital. As of late 2006 and early 2007, the paper's circulation averaged 319,625 for the daily edition and 375,913 for the Sunday edition, giving The Oregonian the 22nd-largest circulation among all major newspapers in the U.S.

==== 2007 ====
In 2007, The Oregonian and its journalists were recognized with several awards. Sports columnist John Canzano was selected as the nation's No. 2 sports columnist in the annual Associated Press Sports Editors Awards. Three Oregonian reporters—Jeff Kosseff, Bryan Denson, and Les Zaitz—were awarded the George Polk Award for national reporting, for their series about the failure of a decades-old, multibillion-dollar, federal program established by the Javits-Wagner-O'Day Act intended to help people with severe disabilities find employment. Instead it "awarded executives handsomely but left disabled workers in segregated jobs often paying less than minimum wage."

On April 16, 2007, it was announced that the staff of The Oregonian was awarded a Pulitzer Prize for Breaking News Reporting for their "skillful and tenacious coverage of a family missing in the Oregon mountains, telling the tragic story both in print and online." In addition, the paper's reporters were finalists in two other categories. Les Zaitz, Jeff Kosseff and Bryan Denson were finalists for the Pulitzer for National Reporting for the same series that also won the George Polk Award noted above. Inara Verzemnieks was nominated for the Pulitzer for Feature Writing for "her witty and perceptive portfolio of features on an array of everyday topics", according to the Pulitzer judges.

==== 2008 ====
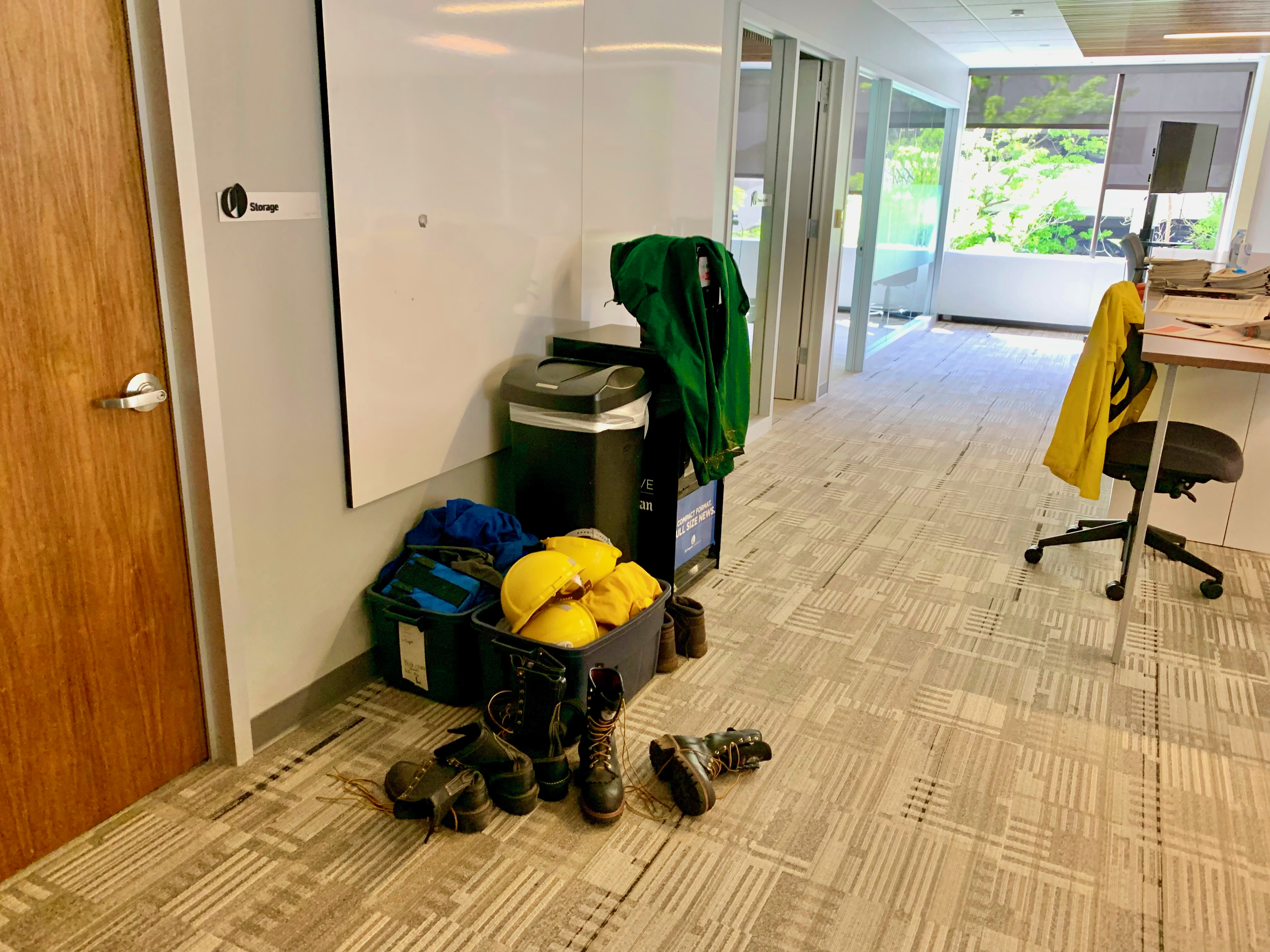
Go-bins in The Oregonian newsroom are filled with boots, hardhats, gear, and jackets for reporters covering wildfires at a moment's notice.

In February 2008, Editor & Publisher named editor Sandra Mims Rowe and executive editor Peter Bhatia as "Editors of the Year". The trade journal noted that since Rowe and Bhatia arrived in 1993, the paper and its journalists had won five Pulitzer Prizes and had been finalists a further nine times. E&P also cited "an increased focus on specialized reporting; a reorganized newsroom that promotes "team reporting" concepts over traditional beats; and regular training sessions and seminars that most staffers credit for encouraging fresh ideas and competitive approaches." Pulitzer Board member Richard Oppel, the editor of the Austin American-Statesman, called the paper "one of the finest newspapers in the country, easily in the top 10."

On September 28, 2008, the paper distributed a DVD of Obsession: Radical Islam's War Against the West as an advertising supplement for that day's edition, two weeks after The New York Times, The Charlotte Observer and The Miami Herald had done the same thing. The Oregonian did so despite Portland mayor Tom Potter's personal request that publisher Fred Stickel not distribute it because the "tenor of the video contributes towards a climate of distrust towards Muslims", and because the paper's willingness to distribute the DVD bestows upon it "an impression of objectivity and legitimacy it does not deserve." Stickel cited "freedom of speech", and an "obligation to keep our advertising columns as open as possible" as reasons for not rejecting the DVD.

Newsroom staff in 2008 was about the same size as it was in 1993, though there were fifty fewer full-time staff members than there were in 2002; about half of those positions were eliminated after a buyout in late 2007. The paper's outside news bureaus grew from four to six during her tenure.

==== 2009 ====
In 2009, The Oregonian was scooped for a third time on a story of an Oregon politician's sex scandal, this time involving Mayor Sam Adams about what Newsweek called his "public deception and private bad judgment" about his past relationship with a teenage legislative intern. Nigel Jaquiss of Willamette Week broke the story after 18 months of investigations; Jaquiss's reporting on another sex scandal involving Neil Goldschmidt earned Jaquiss a 2005 Pulitzer Prize. Jaquiss thinks The Oregonian's failure to follow up on leads that both he and Oregonian reporters had received was a case of "one-newspaper towns being a little too cozy with local power brokers." A media ethics teacher and consultant for The Poynter Institute for Media Studies suggests that the pattern of failure to cover such stories "may have more to do with the culture at The Oregonian, which has recently "built its reputation on thoughtful, narrative coverage ...[that] doesn't lend itself well to digging up sex scandals."

In August 2009, the paper's owners announced the end of a policy that protected full-time employees from layoffs for economic or technological reasons; the change took effect the following February. In September 2009, publisher Fred Stickel announced his retirement, effective September 18, ending 34 years in the position; his son Patrick, president of the paper, was appointed interim publisher but was not a candidate to succeed his father, and Patrick Stickel retired on December 30, 2009. N. Christian Anderson III was named as the new publisher in October, and began work in the position at the beginning of November 2009. After more than 16 years as editor, Sandra Rowe retired at the end of 2009. Peter Bhatia, then executive editor, succeeded her as editor.

=== 2010s ===
Layoffs of 37 in February 2010 left the paper with a total of about 750 employees, including more than 200 in the news department. In September, the newspaper announced that its "TV Click" was to be replaced by TV Weekly, a publication from the Troy, Michigan-based NTVB Media. Unlike "TV Click", TV Weekly requires a separate subscription fee; The Oregonian is following the example of the Houston Chronicle and other major newspapers and switching to "some form of 'opt in and pay' TV sections (rather than dropping the sections) and have found only about 10 percent to 20 percent of subscribers use the sections."

==== 2013 ====
In 2013, publisher N. Christian Anderson announced the paper was restructuring and that beginning October 1, the Oregonian Publishing Company would be dissolved. Two new companies would be formed: the Oregonian Media Group, which will focus on providing content on its online news site, OregonLive.com though it would continue to publish a daily print edition of the paper; and Advance Central Services Oregon, which would provide production, packaging, and distribution support for the new company. Ownership remained with Advance Publications. Though printed seven days a week, home delivery has been reduced to Wednesday, Friday, Saturday, and Sunday. These changes were put into effect, as scheduled, on October 1. The paper also announced that "significant" layoffs were expected. In addition, Anderson announced that the new company would likely move from its downtown Portland building.

==== 2014–2015 ====
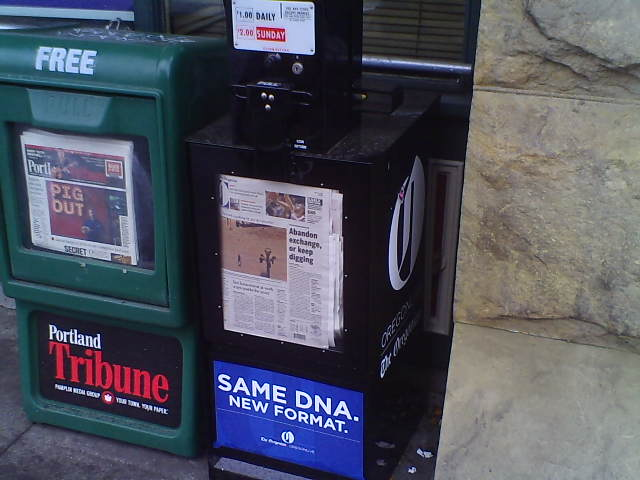
A newly redesigned and installed street vending box for The Oregonian (black) after the paper became a tabloid on April 2, 2014, along with a Portland Tribune box (green)

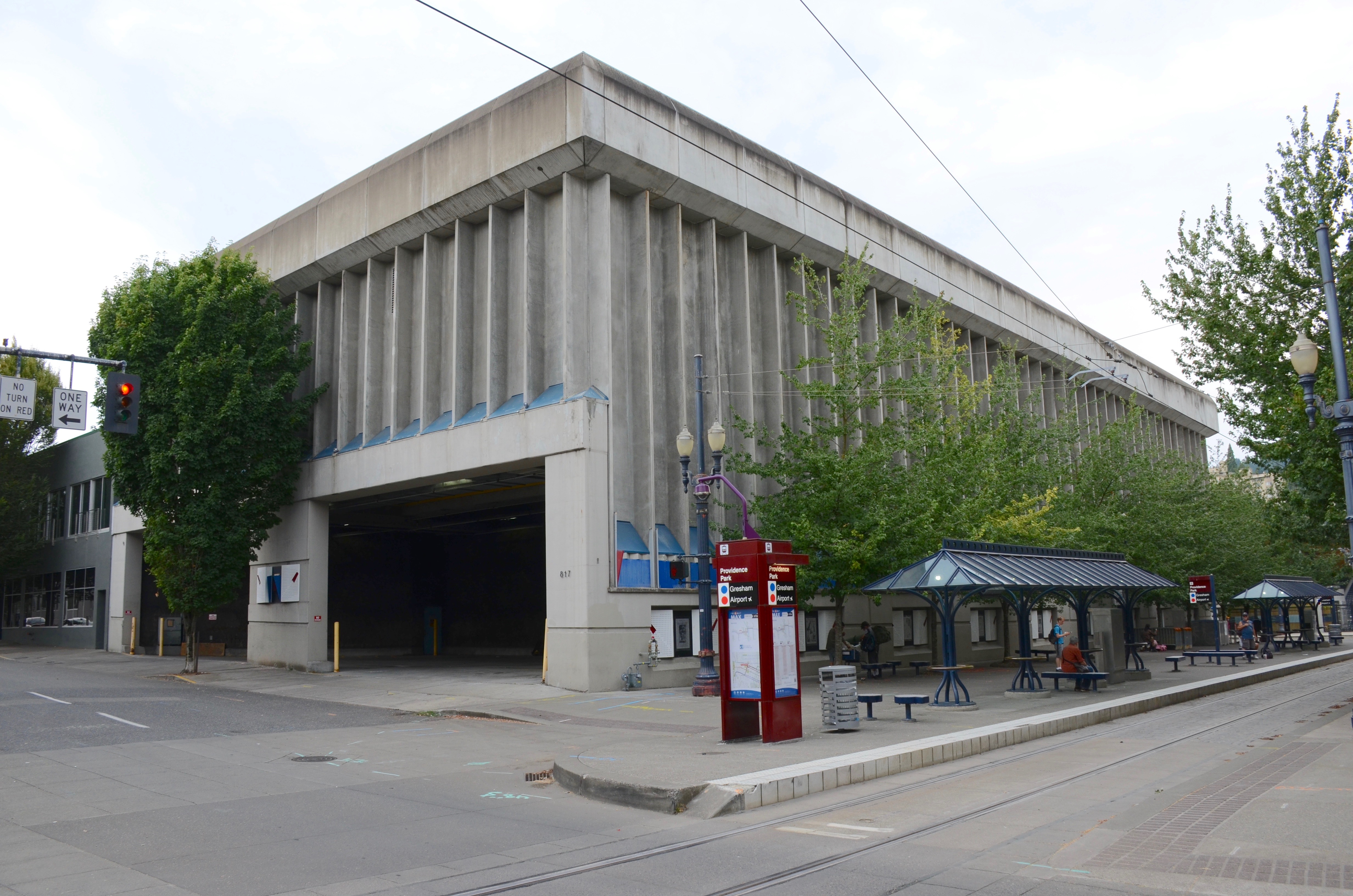
The paper's longtime printing plant, in the Goose Hollow neighborhood west of downtown, closed in 2015 after the paper's printing was outsourced. The smaller of the complex's two buildings (pictured) was demolished in late 2018.

On April 2, 2014, the paper switched from broadsheet format to the smaller tabloid format.

On April 14, 2014, it was announced that the paper's editorial staff—consisting of Mark Hester, Erik Lukens, Susan Nielsen, and Len Reed—had won the 2014 Pulitzer Prize for Editorial Writing, for their coverage of the state of Oregon's public employee retirement system. Reporter Les Zaitz was named as a finalist for Explanatory Reporting for his work on Mexican drug cartels.

Editor Peter Bhatia left the paper in May 2014 to take a teaching position at Arizona State University. In July 2014, it was announced that Mark Katches had been hired as the paper's editor, and would also be the Oregonian Media Group's vice president of content. Also in July 2014, the newspaper moved its headquarters from the building at 1320 SW Broadway that it had occupied since 1948 to a smaller space elsewhere in downtown Portland. The new headquarters takes up around 40,000 ft^{2} (3,700 m^{2}) of space in the Crown Plaza office building, at 1500 SW First Avenue.

N. Christian Anderson left the Oregonian Media Group in May 2015, to become editor and publisher of The Register-Guard, in Eugene, Oregon. Anderson became publisher of The Oregonian in 2009, subsequently being named president of the Oregonian Media Group when that new company replaced the Oregonian Publishing Company in October 2013, with the title of publisher thereafter no longer being used, and in turn was appointed to the new position of chairman of the group in September 2014. Steve Moss succeeded Anderson as Oregonian Media Group president, and the chairman position was to go unfilled.

In June 2015, Advance signed a contract with Signature Graphics to take over printing and distribution of the paper from Advance Central Services Oregon, and announced that it was considering selling its longtime printing plant located near Providence Park. Layoffs of printing-press workers were due to be implemented in August. In February 2017, the Oregonian Publishing Company sold the 41,000-square-foot (3,800 m^{2}) building for $20 million (~$25.8 million in 2025) to a development partnership which said it planned to tear it down and build a 23-story apartment building on the site, now known as the Press Blocks. Demolition of the former printing complex began in fall 2018.

==== 2016 ====
Moss announced in July 2016 that he would depart at the end of August. In the article about Moss's impending departure, it was disclosed that the newspaper's Sunday circulation was at that time approximately 170,000.

On October 24, 2016, the paper's editorial board announced that it would once again decline to endorse a candidate for President of the United States, a practice it first abandoned in 2012. This decision was criticized by some readers, who wondered why the board would offer endorsements in state elections without also taking a position on the presidential race. The board justified its decision by citing the paper's general focus on local issues, writing "Our goal as an editorial board is to have an impact in our community. And we don't think an endorsement for president would move the needle. So that's why we focus our endorsement energy where voters may not have made up their minds and need help with the decision."

==== 2018 ====
Editor Mark Katches left the company in August 2018, to become editor of the Tampa Bay Times, owned by the non-profit Poynter Institute for Media Studies. Therese Bottomly, who had worked The Oregonian since 1983, was named editor and vice president of content in September 2018.

=== 2020s ===
==== Comments section elimination ====
On January 2, 2020, The Oregonian eliminated the comments section of Oregonlive.com. The paper said it was following the trend of other papers in the past decade and said most readers don't utilize the comments feature. The paper also said uncivil comments were taking up too many resources to moderate.

==== Paywall ====
In mid-June 2020, the paper started rolling out stories tagged "Exclusive", marking the announcement of upcoming paywall. These "exclusive" contents, usually front-page stories, were made subscribers-only partway through July and starting on July 27, 2020, it has been switched over to paywall and restricted to paid subscribers only.

==== Print edition ====
In August 2023, The Oregonian announced that the printed version of the paper will be offered only on Wednesdays, Fridays, Saturdays and Sundays, effective January 1, 2024. It will continue publishing daily news online.

In late October 2024, the paper announced it would switch its print edition page format from a tabloid style to broadsheet. The change went into effect in mid-January 2025.

== Targeted publications ==
The staff of The Oregonian also produces three "targeted publications"—glossy magazines distributed free of charge to 40,000–45,000 wealthy residents of the Portland metropolitan area, and sold on newsstands to 5,000 others. A fourth glossy magazine, Explore the Pearl, is produced in conjunction with the Pearl District Business Association, and mailed to "high-income Portland Metro households" within Lake Oswego, West Linn, Mountain Park, Lakeridge, Forest Heights, Raleigh Hills, Oak Hills, West Hills, Dunthorpe, and Clark County.

Magazine	Description	Copies delivered	Target household income	Website
Explore the Pearl	A look at "all of the hot spots—retailers, restaurants and galleries—the Pearl has to offer."	61,000		www.explorethepearl.com
Homes+Gardens Northwest	"Take[s] you inside real Northwest homes and gardens, where residents and professionals have created spaces perfect for the finest Northwest living"	40,000	$120,000 (median)	hgnorthwest.com
Mix	"Celebrates our fascination with fine food and the casual entertaining that marks the Northwest lifestyle"	40,000	$95,000 (median)	mixpdx.com
Ultimate; Northwest	Captures the "experience of living the good life here in Oregon and the Northwest"	45,000	$164,000 (average)	

== Website ==
OregonLive.com
- Type: Website
- Format: Web portal
- Owner: Advance Publications
- Publisher: Oregonian Media Group
- Editor: Therese Bottomly (Editor and vice president of content)
- Staff writers: 9/26 (editorial/marketing)
- Founded: 1997
- Headquarters: 921 SW Washington; Portland, Oregon 97205; United States
- Website: OregonLive.com

OregonLive.com is a website covering local news in Oregon and Southwest Washington. The website serves as the online home of The Oregonian. Started in 1997, it is owned by Advance Publications, which also owns The Oregonian. Betsy Richter was the original editor of the website, and served through 1998 when Kevin Cosgrove took over as editor-in-chief.

Oregonian Media Group also publishes the website Here is Oregon.

In addition to content from the affiliated newspapers, OregonLive also uses content from the Associated Press.

== See also ==
- The Oregonian Printing Press Park
