= William Lambert (journalist) =

American journalist

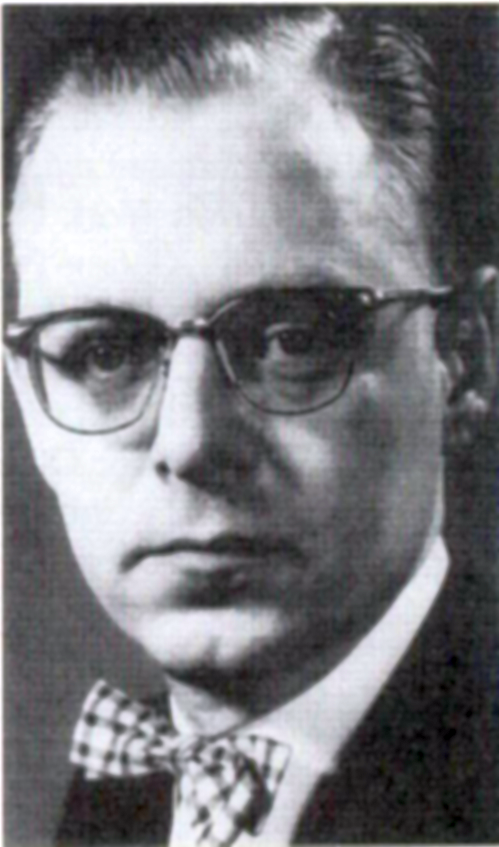
Lambert in 1956

William Gershon Lambert Jr. (February 2, 1920 – February 8, 1998) was an American journalist who wrote for The Oregonian, Life magazine and other publications. Lambert, a native of Langford, South Dakota, won a Pulitzer Prize in 1957. He served in the U.S. Army during World War II. He was a reporter and news editor for the Oregon City Banner-Courier from 1945 to 1950, when he became a reporter for the Oregonian.

Called by one of his editors "the modern-day father of investigative journalism", Lambert launched an investigative journalism team at Life, and forced the resignation of U.S. Supreme Court Justice Abe Fortas in 1969. His Life magazine story on Fortas won the George Polk Award for magazine reporting that year. Fortas, accused of having taken $20,000 from stock swindler Louis Wolfson in 1966, resigned nine days after Lambert's story appeared.

Lambert and The New York Times reporter Wallace Turner shared the Pulitzer Prize for local reporting in 1957 for their five-part series in the Portland Oregonian focusing on Dave Beck, president of the International Brotherhood of Teamsters, and exposing corruption in the union. Lambert and Turner were the first witnesses in the congressional investigation of Beck and the Teamsters.

Lambert died on February 8, 1998, in Philadelphia of a respiratory ailment. He was survived by his wife Jean Kenway Lambert and daughters Kathy (Wollen) Lambert and Heather (Oxberry) Lambert.
