= James V. Grimaldi =

American journalist and investigative reporter

- Education: Bachelor's in Journalism, University of Missouri, - Master's in Journalism, Columbia University
- Employer: Wall Street Journal
- Title: Senior writer
- Awards: Three Pulitzer Prizes

James V. Grimaldi is an American journalist who serves as executive editor of the National Catholic Reporter. He was previously an investigative reporter and senior writer with the Wall Street Journal. He has been awarded the Pulitzer Prize three times, for investigative reporting in 1996 with the staff of the Orange County Register, in 2006 for his work on the Jack Abramoff lobbying scandal while working for The Washington Post, and in 2023 with the staff of the Wall Street Journal for its capital assets series.

== Education ==
Grimaldi graduated with his bachelor's degree from the University of Missouri in 1984. He received his master's degree, in 1993, at the Graduate School of Journalism at Columbia University, as a Knight-Bagehot fellow in business and economics journalism.

=== As an educator ===
Grimaldi has addressed the topic of investigative reporting and the use of the Freedom of Information Act (United States), as a lecturer at George Washington University, Boston College, the University of Maryland, College Park, American University, and Georgetown University. He has also been a Ferris Professor at Princeton University.

== Background and career ==
Grimaldi's work has focused on accountability stories about Congress, politicians, presidential campaigns, D.C. public schools, the Washington Redskins, the Smithsonian Institution, the National Zoo, and many other areas. He has won several awards during his career and is a three-time winner of the Pulitzer Prize. His work with the staff of The Washington Post on "The Hidden Life of Guns" series, won him the Freedom of Information medal.

Grimaldi began his career in journalism after graduation; his first job was writing about the police and the border patrol for the San Diego Tribune, in 1984. He left after three years, to work for the Orange County Register, in California, where he worked on a series of stories about a women's prison and contributed to the Pulitzer prize-winning series about the scandal at a University of California hospital fertility clinic.

Grimaldi left the Register, to join an accelerated study program, after winning a Knight-Bagehot fellowship, earning his master's degree through the program. After graduation, he returned to the Register and in 1996 he moved to Washington, D.C. to work as bureau chief.

In 1998, Grimaldi went to work for The Seattle Times. His work at the Times included coverage of Boeing and the antitrust lawsuit against Microsoft.

In 2000, he left to begin what would become a 12-year career with The Washington Post, where he continued coverage of Microsoft. Grimaldi, with other staff members, won the Pulitzer prize for a series of stories covering the Jack Abramoff scandals, as well as stories about presidential and congressional elections. He contributed to the book, "Deadlock: The Inside Story of America's Closest Election," as well as wrote about the ballot dispute during the 2000 United States presidential election recount in Florida. Grimaldi also wrote about the September 11 attacks. In 2012, Grimaldi left the Post to join The Wall Street Journal, where he is currently working as a Senior Editor.

Grimaldi has served as a board member, and president with the Investigative Reporters and Editors and on the steering committee of the Reporters Committee for Freedom of the Press.

In 2024, Grimaldi left The Wall Street Journal to become executive editor of the National Catholic Reporter.

== Awards ==
- 1996 Pulitzer Prize for Investigative Reporting, for contributions with the staff of the Orange County Register, for a series of stories reporting uncovering fraud and unethical practices at a research university hospital
- 1998 Best of Knight-Bagehot Business Journalism Award for best story by a former fellow, for a series of stories about lawsuits against Microsoft while working at The Seattle Times
- 1999 Washington Correspondence Award from the National Press Club, for a series of stories about lawsuits against Microsoft while working at The Seattle Times
- 1999 Robin Goldstein Award from the National Press Club, for local coverage of the District of Columbia area
- 2005 Worth Bingham Prize for Investigative Reporting, with Susan Schmidt and R. Jeffrey Smith, for their series of stories on Jack Abramoff, with The Washington Post
- 2006 Pulitzer Prize for Investigative Reporting, with the staff of The Washington Post, for their series of stories about congressional corruption and lobbyist Jack Abramoff that exposed congressional corruption
- 2006 Seldon Ring Award for Investigative Reporting, with the staff of The Washington Post, for their series of stories on Jack Abramoff
- 2008 Casey Medal for Meritorious Service, for his work on the D.C. public school system
- 2010 Freedom of Information Medal from Investigative Reporters and Editors for "The Hidden Life of Guns," a series about gun ownership in the U.S., with the staff of The Washington Post.
- 2023 Pulitzer Prize for Investigative Reporting, with the staff of The Wall Street Journal for "Capital Assets", a series examining how federal officials invested in companies that stood to benefit from their agencies' work.
