= R. Jeffrey Smith =

American journalist

Jeff Smith

Personal details
- Born: Chicago, Illinois, U.S.
- Education: Duke University (BA); Columbia University (MS)

R. Jeffrey Smith is a managing director of RosettiStarr LLC, a corporate security and intelligence firm, where he leads investigative work and conducts corporate risk analysis for attorneys, management teams, and investors worldwide. Its clients include corporate enterprises with global operations major private equity firms and hedge funds with a combined $650 billion in assets under management. He joined Rosetti Starr in November 2021.

Previously, he was a managing editor for national security at the Center for Public Integrity, a nonprofit, nonpartisan, investigative newsroom in Washington, D.C. He has been honored by the Gerald R. Ford Foundation for distinguished national defense reporting, and edited and co-written articles that won a National Headliner Award, two Associated Press Media Editors Awards for Investigative Reporting and Public Service, the top award of the Military Reporters and Editors group, and an Editor and Publisher EPPY Award. In August 2020, he also won a Sunshine Award from the Society of Professional Journalists for his "notable contributions to open government."

Previously, he was the national investigative editor, national security correspondent, and national investigative correspondent at The Washington Post, writing about public corruption, judicial issues, intelligence matters, counter-terrorism, and other national security topics. From 1998 until 2001, he was the newspaper's bureau chief in Rome, covering Southern Europe and the armed conflicts and political revolutions in the Balkans. In total, he has conducted or overseen reporting and investigations in more than 50 countries.

Smith won a Pulitzer Prize for Investigative Reporting in 2006, along with two colleagues at the Washington Post, for articles on corruption involving House Majority Leader Tom DeLay and lobbyist Jack Abramoff. He was also a finalist with other Washington Post reporters for the Pulitzer Prize in international reporting in 1999 (from Kosovo), and a finalist with others for the Pulitzer Prize in national reporting in 2005 (about Abu Ghraib and military prisoner abuse). In 2006, he and two other Washington Post reporters received the Selden Ring Award for Investigative Reporting and the Worth Bingham Prize for Investigative Reporting.

Before working at The Post, Smith was a senior writer for the News and Comment section of Science Magazine in Washington, D.C., writing about national security issues, the space program, government regulations, and the environment. In 1986, he received the National Magazine Award for Public Interest from the American Society of Magazine Editors, for writing about arms control. In 1984, he received the Citation for Excellence, Best Magazine Story on Foreign Affairs from the Overseas Press Club. The National Association of Science Writers honored him twice with its Science-in-Society Journalism Award, in 1982 and 1979, for articles about the MX missile and the space program.

Smith received a Bachelor of Arts degree in political science and public policy from Duke University and a Master of Science degree from the Columbia University School of Journalism. He is a member of the Council on Foreign Relations. He was awarded a fellowship at Stanford University's Center for International Security and Arms Control in 1992, a Jefferson Fellowship at the East–West Center in Hawaii in 1997, a fellowship at New York University's Remarque Institute in 2001, a Rockefeller Foundation fellowship in Bellagio, Italy, in 2001, and four media fellowships at Stanford's Hoover Institution between 2002 and 2016. He was journalist-in-residence at the School of Advanced International Studies, Johns Hopkins University in 2002.

Smith authored an article on the Srebrenica massacre on Encyclopædia Britannica. He also sat for an interview on the subject for the Encyclopædia.
