= 2002 Pulitzer Prize =

Awards for journalism and related fields

A listing of the Pulitzer Prize award winners for 2002:

== Journalism ==
- Public Service:
  - The New York Times, for A Nation Challenged, a special section published regularly after the September 11th terrorist attacks on America, which coherently and comprehensively covered the tragic events, profiled the victims, and tracked the developing story, locally and globally.
- Beat Reporting:
  - Gretchen Morgenson of The New York Times, for her trenchant and incisive Wall Street coverage.
- Breaking News Photography
  - The staff of The New York Times, for its consistently outstanding photographic coverage of the terrorist attack on New York City and its aftermath.
- Breaking News Reporting
  - The staff of The Wall Street Journal, for its comprehensive and insightful coverage, executed under the most difficult circumstances, of the terrorist attacks on New York City, which recounted the day's events and their implications for the future.
- Commentary
  - Thomas Friedman of The New York Times, for his clarity of vision, based on extensive reporting, in commenting on the worldwide impact of the terrorist threat.
- Criticism
  - Justin Davidson of Newsday, Long Island, New York, for his crisp coverage of classical music that captures its essence.
- Editorial Cartooning
  - Clay Bennett of The Christian Science Monitor
- Editorial Writing
  - Alex Raksin and Bob Sipchen of the Los Angeles Times, for their comprehensive and powerfully written editorials exploring the issues and dilemmas provoked by mentally ill people dwelling on the streets.
- Explanatory Reporting
  - The staff of The New York Times, for its informed and detailed reporting, before and after the September 11th attacks on America, that profiled the global terrorism network and the threats it posed.
- Feature Photography
  - The staff of The New York Times for its photographs chronicling the pain and the perseverance of people enduring protracted conflict in Afghanistan and Pakistan.
- Feature Writing
  - Barry Siegel of the Los Angeles Times, for his humane and haunting portrait of a man tried for negligence in the death of his son, and the judge who heard the case.
- International Reporting
  - Barry Bearak of The New York Times, for his deeply affecting and illuminating coverage of daily life in war-torn Afghanistan.
- Investigative Reporting
  - Sari Horwitz, Scott Higham, and Sarah Cohen of The Washington Post, for a series that exposed the District of Columbia's role in the neglect and death of 229 children placed in protective care between 1993 and 2000, which prompted an overhaul of the city's child welfare system.
- National Reporting
  - The staff of The Washington Post, for its comprehensive coverage of America's war on terrorism, which regularly brought forth new information together with skilled analysis of unfolding developments.

== Letters ==
- Fiction
  - Empire Falls by Richard Russo (Alfred A. Knopf)
- History
  - The Metaphysical Club: A Story of Ideas in America by Louis Menand (Farrar)
- Biography or Autobiography
  - John Adams by David McCullough (Simon & Schuster)
- General Nonfiction
  - Carry Me Home: Birmingham, Alabama, the Climactic Battle of the Civil Rights Revolution by Diane McWhorter (Simon & Schuster)
- Poetry
  - Practical Gods by Carl Dennis (Penguin Books)
- Drama
  - Topdog/Underdog by Suzan-Lori Parks (TCG)
- Music
  - Ice Field by Henry Brant (Carl Fischer Music). Premiered by the San Francisco Symphony on December 12, 2001, at Davies Symphony Hall, San Francisco, California.
