= Finding Chandra =

2010 book by Scott Higham and Sari Horwitz

Finding Chandra: A True Washington Murder Mystery
- Author: Scott Higham; Sari Horwitz
- Language: English
- Publisher: Scribner
- Publication date: May 11, 2010
- Publication place: United States
- Media type: Hardcover
- Pages: 304
- ISBN: 978-1-4391-3867-0
- OCLC: 430842090

Finding Chandra: A True Washington Murder Mystery is a non-fiction book by Scott Higham and Sari Horwitz, two Pulitzer Prize–winning investigative journalists at The Washington Post. The book, released in May 2010, chronicles the 2001 disappearance of Washington, DC intern Chandra Levy, whose remains were found one year later in an isolated area of the city's 2,800-acre (11 km^{2}) Rock Creek Park. Higham and Horwitz present a thoroughly researched narrative of Chandra's case and the factors that complicated it—an affair between the victim and Congressman Gary Condit, missteps by DC law enforcement, and relentless scrutiny from national media. Finding Chandra received early praise, including from fellow Post colleague Bob Woodward, who declared it to be "Washington's In Cold Blood, expertly and marvelously told by two of journalism's greatest investigative reporters."

== Authors ==
Scott Higham is a Pulitzer Prize-winning member of The Washington Post's investigations unit. He has conducted numerous investigations for the news organization, including an examination of abuse at the Abu Ghraib prison, and waste and fraud in Homeland Security contracting.

Sari Horwitz is another Pulitzer Prize–winning member of The Washington Post's investigation unit. A reporter for The Washington Post for twenty-six years, she has covered crime, homeland security, federal law enforcement, education, and social services. Horwitz and Higham shared the 2002 Pulitzer Prize for Investigative Reporting for their examination of the deaths of children in the D.C. foster care system. She was a member of the team of reporters who won the 2008 Pulitzer Prize for Breaking News Reporting for the shooting rampage at Virginia Tech. Horwitz co-authored the 2003 book, Sniper: Inside the Hunt for the Killers Who Terrorized the Nation.
