= The Metaphysical Club =

Conversational philosophical club in Cambridge, Massachusetts, US

The Metaphysical Club was a name attributed by the philosopher Charles Sanders Peirce, in an unpublished paper over thirty years after its foundation, to a conversational philosophical club that Peirce, the future Supreme Court Justice Oliver Wendell Holmes Jr., the philosopher and psychologist William James, amongst others, formed in January 1872 in Cambridge, Massachusetts, and dissolved in December 1872. Other members of the club included Chauncey Wright, John Fiske, Francis Ellingwood Abbot, Nicholas St. John Green, and Joseph Bangs Warner.

Within the philosophical discussions of the original club, pragmatism is said by Peirce to have been born. The name of the 1872 club was chosen "half-ironically, half-defiantly," according to Peirce, as the group rejected the radical foundationalist European metaphysics in favor of a moderate foundationalism, pursued critical thinking of a pragmatic and positivist nature.

However there is in fact no record of a club of this name in the writings of any of its members apart from Peirce, at the time or later, although Henry James mentioned in a letter that his brother had joined "a metaphysical club."

Upon Peirce's arrival at Johns Hopkins University in 1879, he founded a conversation club there which was definitively named The Metaphysical Club, open to faculty members and graduate students. Amongst its members was John Dewey.

The name The Metaphysial Club was adopted by Louis Menand for his 2001 book, The Metaphysical Club: A Story of Ideas in America, covering American philosophical thought in the second half of the nineteenth century and covering the ideas and lives of many of the members of Peirce's circles in Cambridge and in Johns Hopkins.

== Sources ==
- Menand, Louis, The Metaphysical Club: A Story of Ideas in America (2001), New York: Farrar, Straus and Giroux, ISBN 0-374-19963-9 (hardcover), ISBN 0-374-52849-7 (paperback)
