= Practical Gods =

2001 collection of poems by Carl Dennis

- Author: Carl Dennis
- Genre: Poetry
- Publisher: Penguin Books
- Publication date: 2001
- Publication place: United States of America
- ISBN: 0141002301

Practical Gods is a collection of poems by Carl Dennis published in 2001 by Penguin Books. The collection won the 2002 Pulitzer Prize for Poetry and the 2000 Ruth Lilly Poetry Prize.

== Contents and description ==
One of the guiding motifs of the collection is the imagined interaction between humans and gods, for which Dennis draws off the Greek and Christian pantheons. The poems of Practical Gods can be generally described as free verse and which John Taylor called "thinking poetry" given a heavy emphasis on "exposition of thought" rather than sensory description. Donna Seaman described the register of the collection as "plainspoken".
