= Killing of Chandra Levy =

2001 homicide in Washington, D.C., US

Chandra Levy
- Levy in her high school senior portrait in 1994
- Born: April 14, 1977; Cleveland, Ohio, U.S.
- Disappeared: c. May 1, 2001 (aged 24); Washington, D.C., U.S.
- Burial place: Hughson, California, U.S.
- Education: San Francisco State University; University of Southern California
- Occupation: Intern
- Employer: Federal Bureau of Prisons

Chandra Ann Levy (April 14, 1977 – c. May 1, 2001) was an American intern at the Federal Bureau of Prisons in Washington, D.C., who disappeared in May 2001. She was presumed murdered after her skeletal remains were found in Rock Creek Park in May 2002. The case attracted feverish attention from American news media until the September 11th attacks.

Due to a miscommunication, the Metropolitan Police Department of the District of Columbia (MPD) failed to follow its own search parameters in Rock Creek Park, causing them to not find Levy's body, which then decomposed for a year. Further, the MPD had been informed that Ingmar Guandique, already arrested for attacking women in Rock Creek Park, had confessed to attacking Levy, but soon dismissed that information. The MPD (and the media) instead put much of its focus on the revelation that Levy had been having an extramarital affair with Congressman Gary Condit, a Democrat then serving his fifth term representing California's 18th congressional district and a senior member of the House Permanent Select Committee on Intelligence. Condit was never named as a suspect by police; he was eventually cleared of any involvement. Due to the cloud of suspicion raised by the intense media focus on the missing intern and the later revelation of the affair, Condit lost his bid for re-nomination in 2002.

Following a series of investigative reports by The Washington Post in 2008, the MPD followed up and obtained a warrant, on March 3, 2009, to arrest Ingmar Guandique, who had been identified and dismissed by the MPD eight years earlier. He had been convicted of assaulting two other women in Rock Creek Park around the time of Levy's disappearance and was still in prison on those convictions when the arrest warrant on Levy's death was issued. Prosecutors alleged that Guandique had attacked and tied up Levy in a remote area of the park and left her to die of dehydration or exposure. In November 2010, Guandique was convicted of murdering Levy; he was sentenced in February 2011 to 60 years in prison. In June 2015, Guandique was granted a new trial. On July 28, 2016, prosecutors announced that they would not retry the case against Guandique and would instead seek to have him deported. In March 2017, Guandique lost his bid to remain in the United States and was deported to his native El Salvador on May 5, 2017. Levy's murder remains officially unsolved.

== Life and background ==
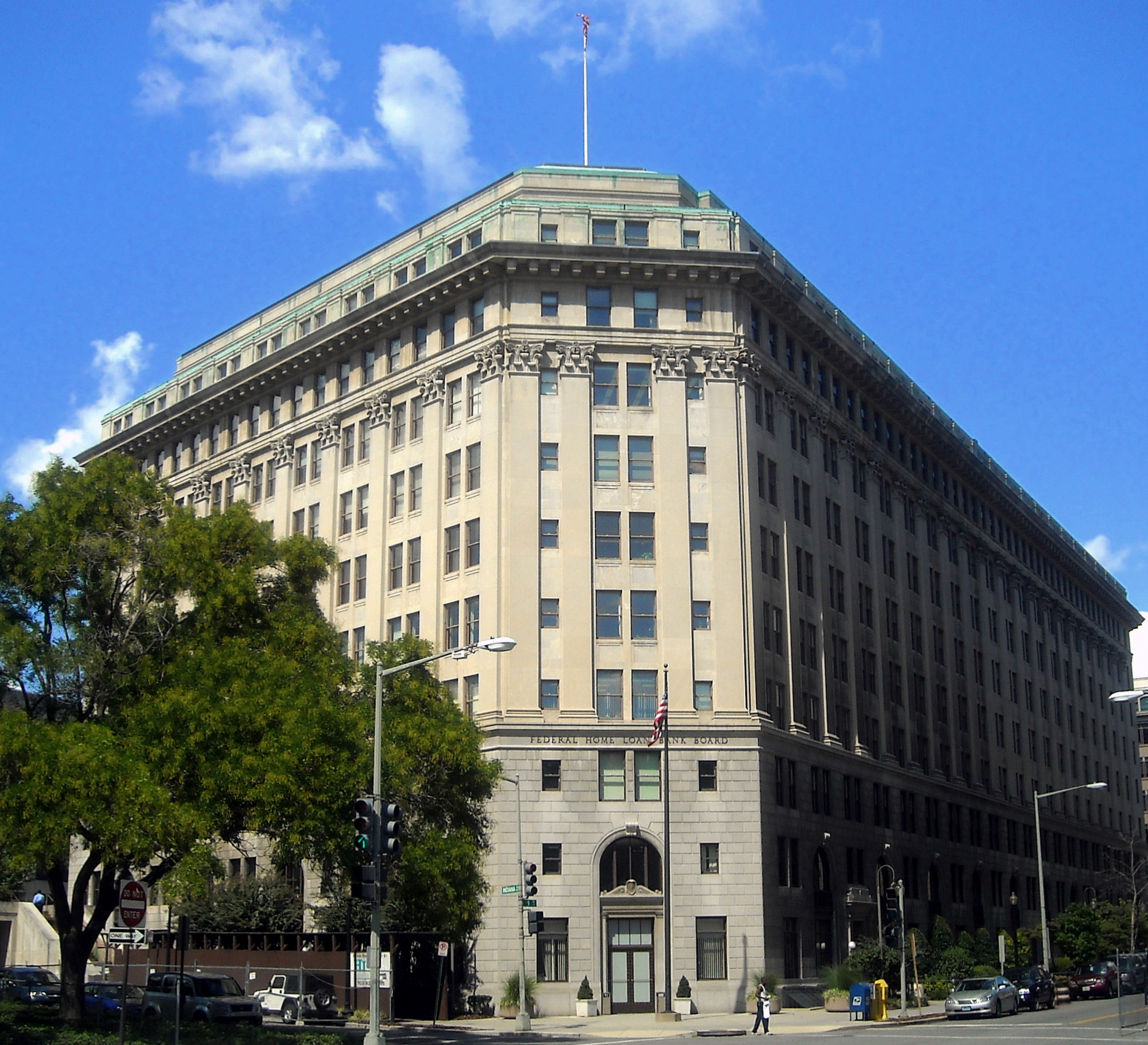
Levy interned at the central office of the Federal Bureau of Prisons in Washington, D.C.

Levy was born in Cleveland, Ohio, to Robert and Susan Levy; the family moved to Modesto, California, where she attended Grace M. Davis High School. At the time of her disappearance, her parents were members of Congregation Beth Shalom, a Conservative Jewish synagogue. She attended San Francisco State University, where she earned a degree in journalism. After interning for the California Bureau of Secondary Education and working in the office of Los Angeles Mayor Richard Riordan, she began attending the University of Southern California to earn a master's degree in public administration.

As part of her final semester of study, Levy moved to Washington, D.C., to become a paid intern with the Federal Bureau of Prisons. In October 2000, she began her internship at the bureau's headquarters, where she was assigned to the public affairs division. Her supervisor, bureau spokesperson Dan Dunne, was impressed with Levy's work, especially her handling of media inquiries regarding the upcoming execution of Timothy McVeigh, convicted of bombing the Oklahoma City Federal Building. Levy's internship was abruptly terminated in April 2001 because her academic eligibility was found to have expired in December 2000. She had already completed her master's degree requirements and was scheduled to return to California in May 2001 for graduation.

== Disappearance and search ==
Levy was last seen on May 1, 2001. The Metropolitan Police Department was first alerted on May 6, when Levy's parents called from Modesto to report that they had not heard from their daughter in five days. Police called hospitals and visited Levy's apartment in Dupont Circle that day, finding no indication of foul play. On May 7, Levy's father told the police that his daughter had been having an affair with a U.S. congressman, and the next day stated that he believed the congressman to be U.S. Representative Gary Condit. Levy's aunt also called the police and told them that Chandra had confided in her about the affair. Police obtained a warrant on May 10 to conduct a formal search of Levy's apartment. Investigators found her credit cards, identification and mobile phone left behind in her purse, along with partially packed suitcases. The answering machine was full, with messages left by her relatives and two from Condit. A police sergeant tried to examine Levy's laptop computer and inadvertently corrupted the internet search data, as he was not a trained technician.

Computer experts took a month to reconstruct the data to determine that the laptop was used on the morning of May 1 to search for websites related to Amtrak, Baskin-Robbins, Condit, Southwest Airlines, and a weather report from The Washington Post. Her final search at 12:59 p.m. was for Alsace-Lorraine, a region in France. A particular search at 11:33 a.m. was for information about Rock Creek Park in The Washington Post "Entertainment Guide", then at 11:34 she clicked a link to bring up a map of the park. Detectives later theorized that she might have met someone at the Pierce-Klingle Mansion which houses the park headquarters. On July 25, 2001, three D.C. police sergeants and 28 police cadets searched along Glover Road in the park but failed to find evidence related to Levy. Later, a second attempt found nothing.

Levy's parents and friends held numerous vigils and press conferences in an attempt to "bring Chandra home".

== Relationship with Condit ==
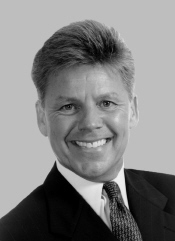
U.S. representative Gary Condit

Controversy surrounding Levy's disappearance drew the attention of the American media. Condit, a married man who represented the congressional district in which the Levy family resided, at first denied that he had had an affair with her. Although police stated that Condit was not a suspect, Levy's family said they felt Condit was being evasive and possibly hiding information about the matter.

Unidentified police sources alleged that Condit had admitted to an affair with Levy during an interview with law enforcement officers on July 7, 2001. Condit described her to police as a vegetarian who avoided drinking and smoking. He thought that Levy was going to return to Washington, D.C., after her graduation and was surprised to find out that the lease on her apartment had ended. Investigators searched Condit's apartment on July 10. They questioned flight attendant Anne Marie Smith, who claimed that Condit told her she did not need to speak to the Federal Bureau of Investigation about his personal life. Federal officials began investigating Condit for possible obstruction of justice, as Smith was also involved in an affair with him (she was not acquainted with Levy). Upset by leaks to the media, Condit refused to submit to a polygraph test by the D.C. police; his attorney asserted that Condit passed a test administered by a privately hired examiner on July 13. He avoided answering direct questions during a televised interview on August 23, with news anchor Connie Chung on the ABC News program Primetime Thursday. Intensive coverage continued until news of the September 11 attacks superseded the media's coverage of the Levy case.

In a nationwide Fox News/Opinion Dynamics poll of 900 registered voters conducted in July 2001, 44 percent of American respondents thought that Condit was involved in Levy's disappearance and 27 percent felt that he should resign. Fifty-one percent of the respondents believed that he was acting as if he were guilty; 13 percent felt that he should run again for office. A poll sample taken from Condit's congressional district held a more favorable view of Condit. On March 5, 2002, Condit lost the Democratic primary election for his Congressional seat to his former aide, then-Assemblyman Dennis Cardoza, with the Levy controversy being cited as a contributing factor. He was subpoenaed to appear on April 1, 2002, before a District of Columbia grand jury investigating the disappearance. The date was kept a secret to avoid further leaks. Condit left Congress at the end of his term on January 3, 2003.

== Discovery of remains ==
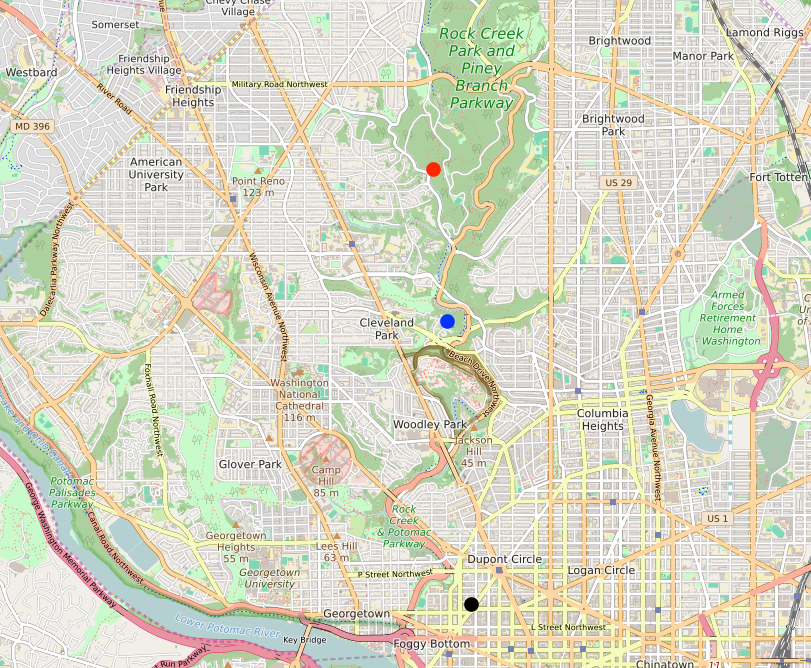
Red circle: Location where Levy's body found Blue circle: Park headquarters Black circle: Levy's apartment

On May 22, 2002, around 9:30 am, skeletal remains which matched Levy's dental records were discovered by a man who was walking his dog and looking for turtles in Rock Creek Park, near Broad Branch Creek in Washington, D.C. Detectives found bones and personal items scattered, but not buried, in a forested area along a steep incline. A sports bra, sweat shirt, leggings and tennis shoes were among the evidence that was recovered. Although police had previously searched over half the 1,754-acre (710 ha) main section of the park, the wooded slope where Levy's remains were eventually found had not been searched. Police commanders ordered the search perimeters to be within 100 yards (91 m) of each road and trail but due to a miscommunication, the officers only searched within 100 yards of every road. The remains were found about four miles (6 km) from Levy's apartment.

After a preliminary autopsy was performed, District of Columbia police announced that there was sufficient evidence to open a homicide investigation. On May 28, D.C. medical examiner Jonathan L. Arden officially declared Levy's death a homicide, but said, "There's less to work with here than I would like. It's possible we will never know specifically how she died." Arden found damage to her hyoid bone, suggesting that she was possibly strangled, but he did not deem it to be conclusive evidence of such a cause of death. On June 6, after the police completed their search, private investigators hired by the Levys found her shin bone with some twisted wire about 25 yards (23 m) from the other remains. Police Chief Charles H. Ramsey said, "It is unacceptable that these items were not located."

== Memorial services ==
On May 28, 2002, the Levy family organized a memorial service at the Modesto Centre Plaza that drew over 1,200 people, some from as far as Los Angeles. Speakers at the 90-minute ceremony included Levy's brother, grandmother, great-aunt and friends. In a eulogy delivered in Hebrew and English by Rabbi Paul Gordon, Levy was described as "a good person taken from us much too soon". About a year later, on May 27, 2003, Levy's remains were buried in Lakewood Memorial Park Cemetery at Hughson, California, near her home town of Modesto. Attended by about 40 of Levy's friends and family members, the private ceremony concluded with the release of 12 white doves.

== Identification of the prime suspect ==
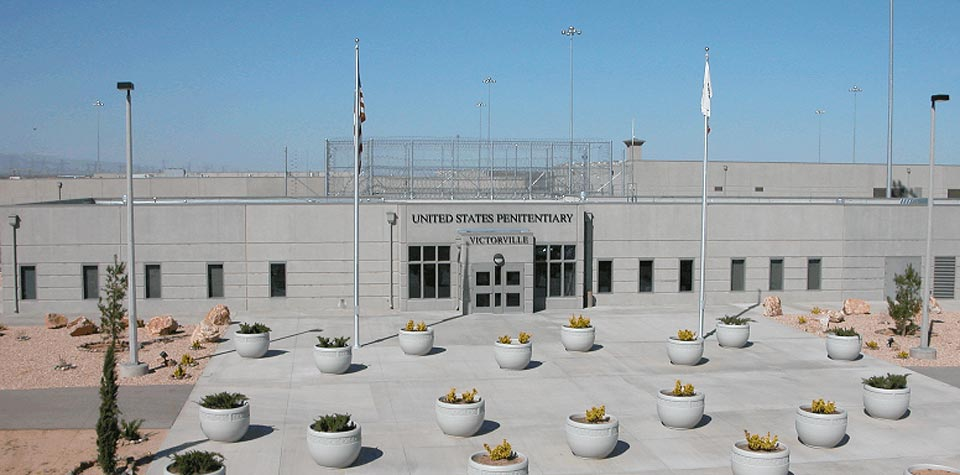
Guandique was incarcerated at the U.S. Penitentiary, Victorville for assaults against two other women in Rock Creek Park.

In September 2001, Washington, D.C., police and federal prosecutors were contacted by the lawyer of an informant, held in D.C. Jail, who claimed to have knowledge of Levy's killer. The informant, whose identity was protected for his safety, said that Ingmar Guandique, a 20-year-old illegal immigrant from El Salvador who was also being held in the jail, told him that Condit paid him $25,000 to kill Levy.

Investigators ruled out the story about Condit, because Guandique had already admitted to assaulting two other women in the same park where Levy's remains were found. Guandique failed to show up for work on the day of Levy's disappearance. His former landlady recalled that his face appeared scratched and bruised at around that time. The investigators on the Levy case did not interview the other Rock Creek Park victims. Police chief Ramsey avoided calling Guandique a suspect and described him as a "person of interest", telling reporters not to make "too big a deal" about him. Assistant chief Terrance Gainer said that if Guandique had been considered a suspect, D.C. police would have been after him "like flies on honey".

Guandique denied attacking Levy. On November 28, the FBI had the informant take a polygraph test, which he failed. A polygraph test on Guandique, administered on February 4, 2002, returned inconclusive results that were officially ruled "not deceptive". Because neither the informant nor Guandique was fluent in English, D.C. chief detective Jack Barrett said that he would have preferred polygraph tests to have been administered by bilingual examiners, who were unavailable at the time. When Judge Noel Anketell Kramer was asked about Guandique's potential connection to the Levy homicide, she responded, "This is such a satellite issue. To me it doesn't have anything to do with this case." Kramer sentenced Guandique to 10 years in prison for his attacks on two other women at Rock Creek Park. Guandique was sent to the U.S. Penitentiary, Big Sandy near Inez, Kentucky, and was later transferred to the U.S. Penitentiary at Victorville, California.

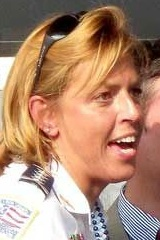
Metropolitan Police Department chief Cathy Lynn Lanier in 2009

The Levy homicide remained listed as a "cold case" until 2006, when Cathy Lynn Lanier succeeded Ramsey as D.C. police chief. Lanier replaced the lead detective on the case with three veteran investigators who had more homicide experience. In 2007, the editors of The Washington Post assigned a new team of reporters to take a year to re-examine the Levy case. The resulting series of articles, published during the summer of 2008, focused on the past failure of the police to fully investigate Guandique's connection to the attacks in Rock Creek Park. In September 2008, investigators searched Guandique's federal prison cell in California and found a photo of Levy that he had saved from a magazine. Police interviewed acquaintances of Guandique and witnesses of the other Rock Creek Park incidents.

On March 3, 2009, the Superior Court of the District of Columbia issued an arrest warrant for Guandique. He was returned to the custody of the District of Columbia Department of Corrections on April 20. Two days later, Guandique was charged in D.C. with Levy's murder. He was indicted by a grand jury on six counts: kidnapping, first-degree murder committed during a kidnapping, attempted first-degree sexual abuse, first-degree murder committed during a sexual offense, attempted robbery, and first-degree murder committed during a robbery. Guandique pleaded not guilty at his arraignment, where a trial date was initially set for January 27, 2010. His lawyers unsuccessfully argued that Guandique's federal prison cell was outside the jurisdiction of a court-ordered search. After errors in processing contaminated some of the gathered evidence with DNA from employees of the prosecution, the start date of the trial at the H. Carl Moultrie Courthouse was moved to October 4, 2010.

== Trial of Guandique ==
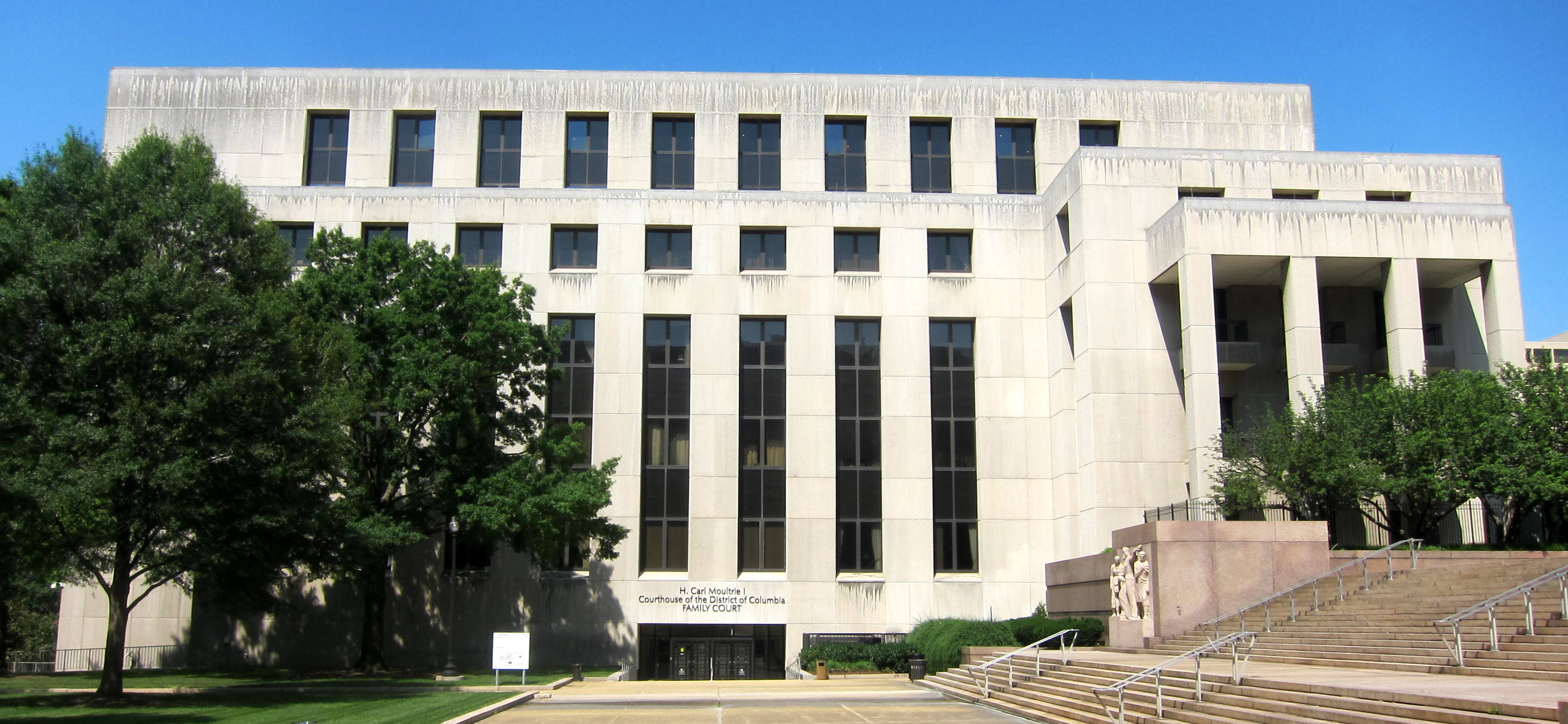
Guandique was tried at the H. Carl Moultrie Courthouse in Washington, D.C.

On October 18, 2010, jury selection commenced in the Superior Court of the District of Columbia before Judge Gerald I. Fisher. Assistant U.S. Attorney Fernando Campoamor-Sanchez presented the names of potential witnesses for the trial, including FBI agent Brad Garrett and the two women whom Guandique was convicted of assaulting. At the start of the trial, the prosecution's case was expected to take around four weeks and the defense was expected to take one day. On October 25 and 26, Halle Shilling and Christy Wiegand testified about being attacked by Guandique while independently jogging in Rock Creek Park. Wiegand recounted that Guandique grabbed her from behind, dragged her down a ravine and held a knife against her face.

On October 26, 2010, Levy's then-64-year-old father, Robert, took the stand and refuted statements about his past suspicions of Condit. Robert Levy testified that he told authorities during the early years of the investigation that his daughter Chandra would have been too cautious to jog in the woods alone, but said that he no longer believed this to be true. He said that he also told police that his daughter and Condit had a five-year plan between them to get married. In retrospect, Robert Levy said that the family had been angry at Condit and had said whatever came to mind at the time. He testified that they had initially suspected Condit before learning about Guandique. On November 1, Condit testified at the trial and was asked on at least three occasions if he and Chandra Levy had been involved in a sexual relationship. He replied, "I am not going to respond to that question out of privacy for myself and Chandra." FBI biologist Alan Giusti testified that semen found on underwear from Levy's apartment contained sperm matching Condit's DNA profile.

Prosecution witness Armando Morales, who shared a cell with Guandique at the U.S. Penitentiary in Kentucky, testified that Guandique was concerned about being transferred between prisons in 2006 because of inmate violence against suspected rapists. Morales stated that Guandique, a fellow member of the Mara Salvatrucha gang, confided to him that he had killed Levy while trying to rob her, but said that he did not rape her. The prosecution rested their case on November 10, while dropping two out of the six charges against Guandique: sexual assault and murder associated with that assault. On November 15, the defense rested its case without calling Guandique to the stand. Other prison witnesses called by the defense disputed Morales's testimony. Jose Manuel Alaniz said that Guandique made no mention of rape or murder while sharing a cell with both Alaniz and Morales at the penitentiary in Kentucky. Alaniz admitted under cross-examination that he "didn't want to be too nosy" and was often asleep at the prison while recovering from a gunshot wound. The prosecution dropped two more charges because the statute of limitations had passed: kidnapping and attempted robbery. During closing arguments for the remaining charges of first-degree murder committed during a kidnapping and during a robbery, prosecutor Amanda Haines contended that Guandique bound and gagged Levy after attacking her, leaving her to die of dehydration or exposure in the park. Defense attorney Santha Sonenberg countered with the lack of any DNA evidence connecting Guandique to the crime scene. Calling the prosecution's case "fiction", Sonenberg suggested that Levy had been murdered elsewhere, with her dead body being dumped in the park.

The jury began deliberations on November 17, 2010. Scheduled proceedings of the case met delays because of increased security at the courthouse. After two days of deliberations, all but one juror had voted to convict Guandique. On the third day, the jury asked Judge Gerald Fisher to clarify the definition of assault. Fisher responded that any physical injury could legally be considered an assault, regardless of how small. On November 22, 2010, the jury found Guandique guilty of both remaining counts of first-degree murder. After the trial, a juror said the testimony of Morales was decisive in reaching the verdict. The conviction was called a "miracle" for having been reached with only circumstantial evidence. Gladys Weatherspoon, who had previously represented Guandique in the 2001 assault cases, stated that she was troubled by the jury's verdict: "I just think they were going to convict anyway... They felt bad for that woman, the mom. She's sitting in there every day." At a post-trial press conference, Susan Levy said, "There's always going to be a feeling of sadness. I can surely tell you, it ain't closure." Since the conclusion of the trial, Susan Levy has acted to keep photographic evidence of her daughter's remains sealed from the news media.

=== Sentencing and appeals ===
On February 1, 2011, Guandique's attorneys requested a new trial on the grounds that the verdict had been improperly attained. The 17-page filing claimed that the prosecutors had appealed to the emotions of the jury, using "references to facts not in evidence". The motion also alleged that one juror, who did not take notes, had breached the judge's instructions not to be "influenced by another juror's notes". The prosecution opposed a retrial, arguing that the issue regarding the notes was no more than a technicality that did not have a significant effect on the verdict.

Guandique faced a minimum penalty of 30 years to a maximum of life imprisonment without the possibility of parole. In seeking the maximum possible sentence, the prosecutors stated that Guandique "is unable to control himself and thus, will always remain a danger to women". A memo submitted by the prosecution in February 2011 cited Guandique's harassment of female staff in prison, including soliciting a nurse and masturbating in front of guards. Assistant U.S. Attorney Fernando Campoamor-Sanchez disclosed that he had traveled to El Salvador with a detective to investigate allegations that Guandique had fled his native country because of suspected attacks against local women dating back to 1999. During the sentencing hearing on February 11, Guandique said to Levy's family, "I am sorry for what happened to your daughter", and insisted on his innocence. Before Judge Gerald Fisher reminded Susan Levy to address the court instead of the defendant, Levy said to him, "Did you really take her life? Look me in my eyes and tell me." Fisher denied Guandique's motion for retrial and handed down a sentence of 60 years in prison, stating that Guandique "will be a danger for some time. He's a sexual predator."

Guandique repeated his claims of innocence during his sentencing. He has maintained his innocence in the years since the trial.

On February 25, 2011, public defender James Klein filed an appeal of Guandique's conviction with the District of Columbia Court of Appeals. In December 2012 and January 2013, a set of secret hearings were made known to the public, but the subject of the meetings was sealed by the judge. After a third hearing in February, the judge in the case unsealed transcripts from the previous hearings which revealed that Klein was seeking a new trial based on new evidence in the case. A fourth hearing was scheduled for April 2013.

=== Dropped charges ===
In May 2015, prosecutors dropped their opposition to a new trial. This resulted from defense claims that the prosecution's star witness, Armando Morales, had perjured himself on the stand. The defense contended that prosecutors failed to disclose that Morales was a jailhouse informant with a reputation for being untrustworthy. Morales had denied ever being an informant. The defense also argued that Morales made up Guandique's confession in order to boost his stock with prosecutors. On June 3, the defense said that a new witness, a neighbor, called 911 at 4:37 a.m. on the last day Levy was alive in order to report hearing a "blood-curdling scream", possibly coming from Levy's apartment. The following day, Judge Gerald Fisher granted a motion for the new trial. Judge Robert E. Morin set the retrial of Guandique for March 1, 2016, but at that time, it was moved to October 11.

In November 2015, prosecutors told a D.C. Superior Court judge that their office had failed to turn over documents to the defense before the defendant's first trial. In December 2015, defense attorneys argued in new court filings that the charges should be dismissed because of those errors.

Specifically, the defense argued that they had only received two of three pages of a memo detailing prosecutors' contacts with Morales. At trial he had testified that he had never cooperated with law enforcement prior to the Levy case. The missing first page noted that he had previously approached law enforcement to discuss gang activity, including the actions of gangs to which he belonged. The defense argued this information had been purposely withheld from them, as it might suggest that Morales had shaded his testimony to gain favor with prosecutors.

On July 28, 2016, prosecutors announced that they would not proceed with the case against Guandique and would, instead, seek to have him deported. According to The Washington Post, prosecutors lost confidence in the case after learning that Morales, who now lives in Maryland, was secretly recorded admitting lying on the witness stand during the 2010 trial. Babs Proller, the woman who made the recording, turned it over to the police. The U.S. Attorney's Office said only that based on new information that had come to light during the previous week, there was no longer enough evidence to go forward with the retrial. In March 2017, Guandique lost his bid to remain in the United States and was deported to his native El Salvador two months later.

=== Disciplinary proceedings against prosecutors ===
Defense lawyers for Guandique believed that Campoamor-Sánchez and Haines had deliberately failed to turn over the first page of the Morales memo. They filed a complaint to that effect with the Justice Department's Office of Professional Responsibility (OPR). After investigating for two years, OPR found no ethical or legal violations.

Campoamor-Sánchez left the Justice Department to work at the Securities and Exchange Commission, and Haines retired. In 2020 the District of Columbia Bar's Office of Disciplinary Counsel (ODC) announced it would investigate the allegations; it brought charges the following May.

Both of the accused attorneys testified. Haines believed that the full memo had been turned over to the defense and they had lost the first page. She did not think there would have been any reason for prosecutors to withhold it as it did not seriously damage their case, but she sometimes delayed turning over more specific information on witnesses to the defense since at some trials that had led to those witnesses getting killed. Both she and Campoamor-Sánchez testified that they had clashed over what to turn over to the defense and when, since at the time there were no clear rules in the Justice Department about it, leading to greater clashes between the two about who would question Morales at trial and handle the case's closing argument—Campoamor-Sánchez had originally been scheduled to do both, but Haines reassigned those tasks to herself, leaving him feeling marginalized.

Three months later, ODC announced its preliminary conclusion that the two had violated bar rules requiring that prosecutors disclose potentially exculpatory evidence to defense lawyers, and recommended both be suspended from practicing law for six months. Both contested that punishment, with Haines's attorney calling it "unhinged—from both reality and from any precedent in law or logic". She and Campoamor-Sánchez have denied any wrongdoing.

== Media coverage ==
The disappearance of Chandra Levy became a national topic of the news media in the summer of 2001, with 63% of Americans closely following the case. The media swamped Levy's parents from the moment they decided to go to Washington, D.C., in search of their daughter. According to Condit, about a hundred reporters were camped out in front of his apartment during the morning of September 11, 2001, but they all left after news spread about that day's terrorist attacks in New York and Washington. Media critics and cable news executives later cited the Levy case, as well as the concurrent sensationalist coverage of a string of shark attacks, as a reflection of the manner of news coverage in the United States before the September 11 attacks had taken priority.

In 2002, D.C. newspaper Roll Call first reported Ingmar Guandique's possible connection to the case, with little effect on the news media's focus on Condit. Conservative commentator Michelle Malkin noted the lack of headlines that an illegal immigrant had been questioned in the Levy case. She said that in her review of 115 news items from the LexisNexis database, not a single mention of Guandique referred to his status as a "criminal illegal alien". She called the "glaring omission" of his status "a newsworthy act of negligence". She wrote that only the very conservative Human Events reported that the Immigration and Naturalization Service had approved his working legally while he was applying for temporary protected status. That application was ultimately denied, but not before he had assaulted two other women at Rock Creek Park.

In 2005, investigative journalist Dominick Dunne said on Larry King Live that he believed that Gary Condit had more information about the Levy case than he had been disclosing. Condit filed two lawsuits against Dunne, forcing him into an undisclosed financial settlement on one of them. In 2008, U.S. District Judge Peter Leisure dismissed the other suit that alleged slander, because "The context in which Dunne's statements were made demonstrates that they were part of a discussion about "speculation" in the media and inaccurate media coverage".

During the summer of 2008, The Washington Post ran a 13-part series billed, in part, as "a tale of the tabloid and mainstream press pack journalism that helped derail the investigation". The two investigative reporters who were behind the Post series, Scott Higham and Sari Horwitz, wrote a book which detailed their investigation. The book, Finding Chandra, was published in May 2010. Commentators, including The Washington Post Metro reporter Robert Pierre, wrote that emphasis on a glamorous white murder victim, when "about 200 people are killed in this city every year, most of them black and male", was "absolutely absurd and dare I say, racist, at its core".

The media was criticized for its "rush to judgment" in suggesting, sometimes blatantly, that Condit was guilty of the murder, especially in the early days of the investigation. Some of the reporters who were camped out in front of Condit's Washington apartment house were quoted as saying that they would remain there "until he resigns". When Ingmar Guandique was convicted of murdering Levy in November 2010, Condit's lawyer Bert Fields remarked, "It's a complete vindication but that comes a little late. Who gives him his career back?"

On the 17th anniversary of the homicide, Levy's mother continued to push for further investigation into her daughter's death.

An episode of the podcast You're Wrong About released on May 25, 2020, reviewed the events surrounding her disappearance and the search for her.

== Impact ==
Levy's death has had a lasting impact, due in part to the efforts of her family and friends. Levy's disappearance came after a number of other high-profile cases that led to the creation of resources for missing young adults. For example, Levy's parents quickly requested help from the Carole Sund/Carrington Memorial Reward Foundation, a nonprofit group that was established in Modesto after three female tourists disappeared from a 1999 trip to Yosemite National Park and were later found slain. That foundation, which offered the Levys staff support and contributed towards a cash reward for information about Chandra's disappearance, was merged into the Laci and Conner Search and Rescue Fund in 2009; Susan Levy had previously participated in the efforts to find Laci Peterson, another missing woman from Modesto.

In 1997, when Kristen Modafferi mysteriously disappeared from the San Francisco Bay Area three weeks after her 18th birthday, her parents turned to their congresswoman for help, because they were ineligible to receive help from the National Center for Missing and Exploited Children. As a result, Congress enacted "Kristen's Law" in October 2000, which established the National Center for Missing Adults (NCMA) within the U.S. Department of Justice in order to coordinate such missing persons cases. By the time Levy disappeared, institutions were in place in order to provide her family with support and assist in a nationwide search to locate her. Although the Levy family quickly moved to mobilize all such available resources, including offering a cash reward for information, hiring its own investigators, and seeking media attention, those efforts to locate Chandra Levy or find her killer were overshadowed by the speculation which surrounded her possible relationship with Condit. Susan Levy later joined forces with Donna Raley, the mother of another young woman who disappeared from Modesto in 1999, to form "Wings of Protection", a support group for people with missing loved ones. The Mary Ann Liebert company, the publisher of the Journal of Women's Health and Gender-Based Medicine, presented its annual Criterion Award to Susan Levy for her work with "Wings of Protection" in May 2002.

Newsweek magazine stated that the media may have become more skeptical of "herd mentality" and open to alternative suspects after the Levy case. The D.C. police claimed that it would have discovered Levy's body earlier if not for a miscommunication regarding the scope of the search. Commanders had ordered that a search be conducted within 100 yd (91 m) of each road and trail in Rock Creek Park, but searches were only made within 100 yards of each road, causing the body to remain undiscovered for a longer period of time.

Both the chief of detectives, Jack Barrett, and the chief of police, Charles H. Ramsey, have since left the force in Washington, D.C. Ramsey became head of the Philadelphia Police Department; Barrett, who became an analyst for an intelligence support firm in Arlington County, Virginia, stated in hindsight that the media had imposed "enormous amounts of pressure" on the Washington, D.C. police. Morales, who is serving time for conspiracy to distribute methamphetamine and crack cocaine, was scheduled to be released on August 5, 2016. Condit retired from politics and moved to Phoenix, Arizona with his wife to manage real estate and open two Baskin-Robbins franchises, which have since closed.

== See also ==
- Crime in Washington, D.C.
- List of solved missing person cases (2000s)
- List of unsolved murders (2000–present)
