= Tanya Jones Bosier =

American judge (born 1973)

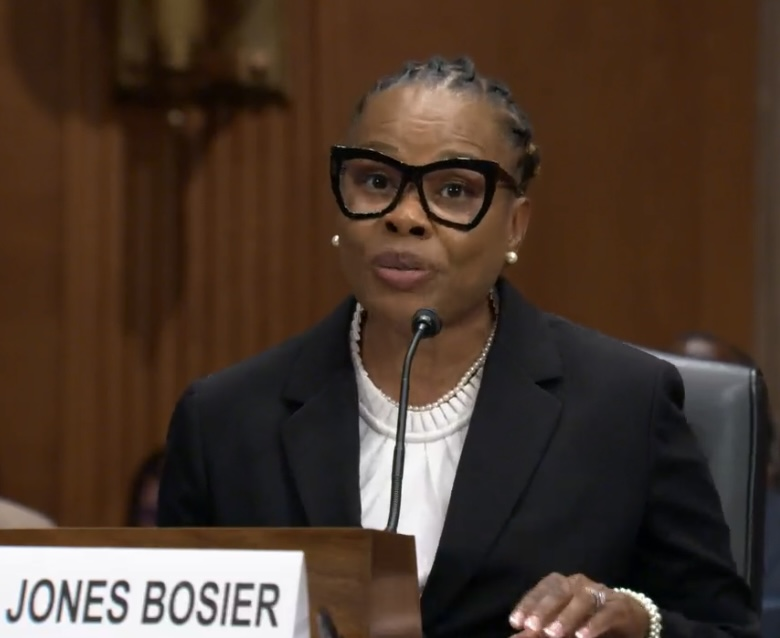

Associate Judge of the Superior Court of the District of Columbia
- Incumbent
- Assumed office June 21, 2024
- Appointed by: Joe Biden
- Preceded by: Gerald Fisher

Magistrate Judge of the Superior Court of the District of Columbia
- In office 2017 – June 21, 2024

Personal details
- Born: July 2, 1973 (age 52) Brooklyn, New York
- Education: Syracuse University (BA); American University (JD)

Tanya Monique Jones Bosier (born July 2, 1973) is an American lawyer who has served as an associate judge of the Superior Court of the District of Columbia since 2024. She previously served as a magistrate judge of the same court from 2017 to 2024.

== Education ==
Jones Bosier earned a Bachelor of Arts degree from Syracuse University in 1995 and a Juris Doctor from the American University Washington College of Law in 2000 where she received the Covington and Burling LLP and Equal Justice Fellowships. While attending Syracuse University, Jones Bosier received a scholarship to study in Harare, Zimbabwe.

== Career ==
From 2000 to 2001, Jones Bosier served as a law clerk for Judge Zoe Bush on the Superior Court of the District of Columbia. She served as an assistant attorney general in the District of Columbia Attorney General's Office from 2001 to 2014. In 2014 and 2015, Jones Bosier served as assistant general counsel for the District of Columbia Department of Human Services. She served as assistant general counsel for the District of Columbia Courts from 2015 to 2017 and was nominated as a magistrate judge in 2017.

=== D.C. superior court service ===
On March 20, 2023, President Biden announced his intent to nominate Jones Bosier to serve as a judge of the Superior Court of the District of Columbia.

On March 21, 2023, her nomination was sent to the Senate. President Biden nominated Jones Bosier to the seat vacated by Judge Gerald Fisher, who retired on August 31, 2022. On September 12, 2023, her nomination was reported out of committee by a 9–3 vote. On January 3, 2024, her nomination was returned to the president under Rule XXXI, Paragraph 6 of the United States Senate. She was renominated on January 11, 2024. On January 31, 2024, her nomination was reported out of committee by a 7–3 vote. On June 4, 2024, the Senate invoked cloture on her nomination by a 57–41 vote. Later that day, her nomination was confirmed by a 57–41 vote. She was sworn in on June 21, 2024.

== Recognition ==
Jones Bosier was awarded the 2014-2015 Adjunct Professor of the Year and the 2018 American University Washington College of Law Hairston Alumni Award.

== See also ==
- List of African American jurists

Legal offices
Preceded by Gerald Fisher	Associate Judge of the Superior Court of the District of Columbia; 2024–present	Incumbent
