= Scott Higham =

American journalist

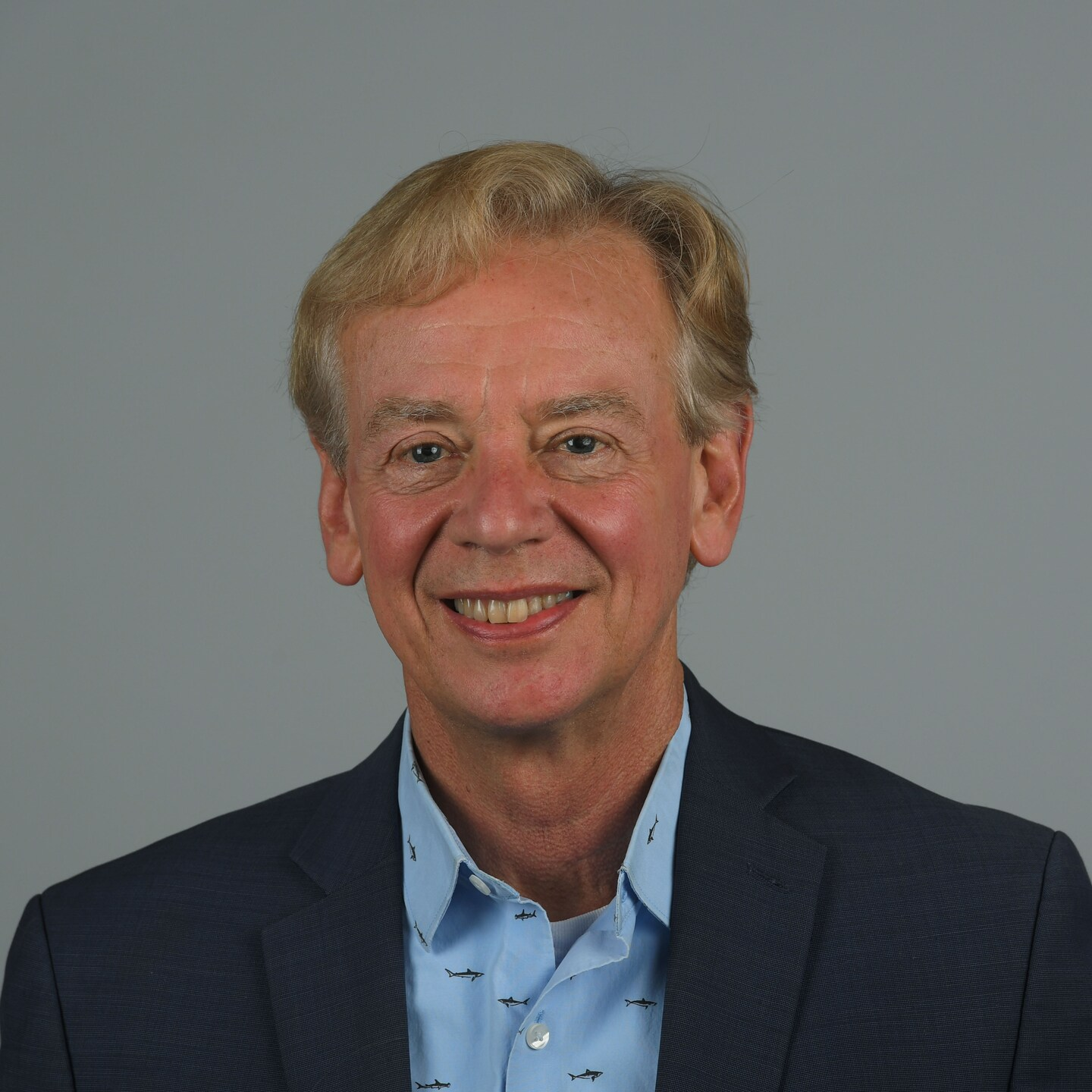
- Higham in 2022
- Born: Queens, New York, U.S.
- Education: Stony Brook University (BA); Columbia Graduate School of Journalism (MS)
- Occupation: Investigative Reporter
- Awards: Two Pulitzer Prizes

Scott Higham is a Pulitzer Prize-winning American journalist and author who documented the corporate and political forces that fueled the opioid epidemic, in addition to conducting other major investigations. He is a five-time Pulitzer Prize finalist and won the Pulitzer twice with his colleagues at The Washington Post. He is also coauthor of two books.

== Early life and education ==
Born in Queens, New York, Higham grew up on Long Island. He is the son of a New York City homicide detective stationed in the Fort Apache precinct in the South Bronx and an airline secretary and homemaker from Winthrop, Massachusetts. He graduated from Stony Brook University with a B.A. in history and an M.S. from the Columbia Graduate School of Journalism. Higham also earned an A.S. in criminal justice at Suffolk County Community College.

== Career ==
Higham began his journalism career as the editor of his college newspaper, The Stony Brook Press. He then worked as a news clerk for Newsday and as a stringer and copyboy for The New York Times. After graduating from Columbia, he worked at the Allentown Morning Call, the Miami Herald and The Baltimore Sun.

Higham joined The Washington Post in 2000 and has conducted numerous investigations for the news organization, including an examination of the D.C. foster care system, abuse at the Abu Ghraib prison and waste and fraud in Homeland Security contracting. The foster care series with Sari Horwitz and Sarah Cohen won the Pulitzer Prize for Investigative Reporting in 2002. The Abu Ghraib investigation was a finalist for the 2005 Pulitzer Prize for National Reporting, and the series on contracting with Robert O’Harrow Jr. won the Investigative Reporters and Editors Award for large newspapers. Higham has also investigated the Guantanamo Bay detention camp and conflicts of interest on Capitol Hill.

Higham spent six years examining the opioid epidemic as a lead reporter for The Washington Post. The first series revealed the corporate influences behind the opioid epidemic and was a finalist for the Pulitzer Prize for Public Service in 2020 for its “unprecedented insight into America’s deadly opioid epidemic.” A second series on the rise of fentanyl was a finalist for the Pulitzer Prize for Public Service in 2023. The Pulitzer Board called that project an “exhaustive investigation” that exposed “the government’s failure to address the epidemic of addiction.” He won numerous awards with Lenny Bernstein of The Washington Post and Bill Whitaker, Ira Rosen and Sam Hornblower of 60 Minutes for investigations into the causes of the opioid epidemic. He began working for 60 Minutes in June 2024.

== Books ==
Higham and Sari Horwitz co-authored the book Finding Chandra: A True Washington Murder Mystery. The non-fiction book chronicles the 2001 disappearance of Washington, DC intern Chandra Levy, whose remains were found one year later in an isolated area of the city's 2,800-acre (11 km^{2}) Rock Creek Park. The book was a 2011 finalist for an Edgar Award, sponsored by Mystery Writers of America.

They also co-authored the critically acclaimed book, American Cartel: Inside the Battle to Bring Down the Opioid Industry. Bob Woodward called the book “an eye-opening, shocking and deeply documented investigation of the opioid crisis by two great reporters.”

== Awards and recognition ==
- 2023, Pulitzer Prize, Finalist, Public Service, with the staff of The Washington Post, “for exposing “the government's failure to address the epidemic of addiction."
- 2020, Pulitzer Prize, Finalist, Public Service, for using “previously hidden government records and confidential company documents to provide unprecedented insight into America’s deadly opioid epidemic."
- 2019, Alfred I. duPont-Columbia Award, joint investigation into the opioid epidemic with “60 Minutes."
- 2018, Emmy Award, joint investigation with “60 Minutes."
- 2018, Peabody Award, with the staff of The Washington Post and CBS News 60 Minutes, for "The Whistleblower" the joint investigation into how the Drug Enforcement Administration was hobbled in its attempts to hold Big Pharma accountable in the opioid epidemic."
- 2018, The Hillman Prize for Broadcast Journalism, with the staff of The Washington Post and CBS News 60 Minutes, for "The Whistleblower" and "Too Big to Prosecute"
- 2018, Society of Professional Journalists, Sigma Delta Chi, Public Service, joint investigation with "60 Minutes."
- 2018, Loeb Award, Finalist, joint investigation with "60 Minutes."
- 2018, Edward R. Murrow Award, joint investigation with "60 Minutes."
- 2017, Polk Award, Medical Reporting, with the staff of The Washington Post, for tracing lax regulation of the distribution of narcotic painkillers by the Drug Enforcement Administration.
- 2016, Pulitzer Prize for National Reporting, with the staff of The Washington Post, for its revelatory initiative in creating and using a national database to illustrate how often and why the police shoot to kill and who the victims are most likely to be.
- 2016, The Society of Professional Journalists, Sigma Delta Chi, with the staff of The Washington Post, for their investigative reporting on the DEA's lax regulation on opioid distribution.
- 2012, Society of Professional Journalists, Sigma Delta Chi, with the staff of The Washington Post, for "Capitol Assets."
- 2012, Everett Dirksen Award for Distinguished Reporting of Congress, with the staff of The Washington Post.
- 2011, Edgar Award, Mystery Writers of America, Finalist.
- 2005, Investigative Reporters & Editors Inc., First Place, Large Newspapers
- 2005, Pulitzer Prize, Finalist, National Reporting, with the staff of The Washington Post, “for its relentless, unflinching chronicle of abuses by American soldiers at Abu Ghraib prison in Iraq.”
- 2002, Pulitzer Prize for Investigative Reporting, with Horwitz and Cohen of The Washington Post, for a series that exposed the District of Columbia's role in the neglect and death of 229 children placed in protective care between 1993 and 2000, which prompted an overhaul of the city's child welfare system.
- 2002, Robert F. Kennedy Journalism Award (Grand Prize and Domestic Print), with Horwitz and Cohen of The Washington Post, for "The District's Lost Children."
- 2002, Investigative Reporters & Editors Inc., IRE Medal.
- 2002, Associated Press Managing Editors Award.
- 2002, Heywood Broun Award, with Horwitz and Cohen of The Washington Post, for "The District's Lost Children."
- 1998, Times Mirror Journalist of the Year.
- 1994, Pulitzer Prize, Finalist, Feature Writing, with April Witt at The Miami Herald.
- 1993, Pulitzer Prize, Finalist, Spot News Reporting, with the staff of Miami Herald.

Note: "The Whistleblower" and "Too Big to Prosecute" were also finalists for the Gerald Loeb Award and the Scripps Howard Journal Award.
