= Sari Horwitz =

American journalist

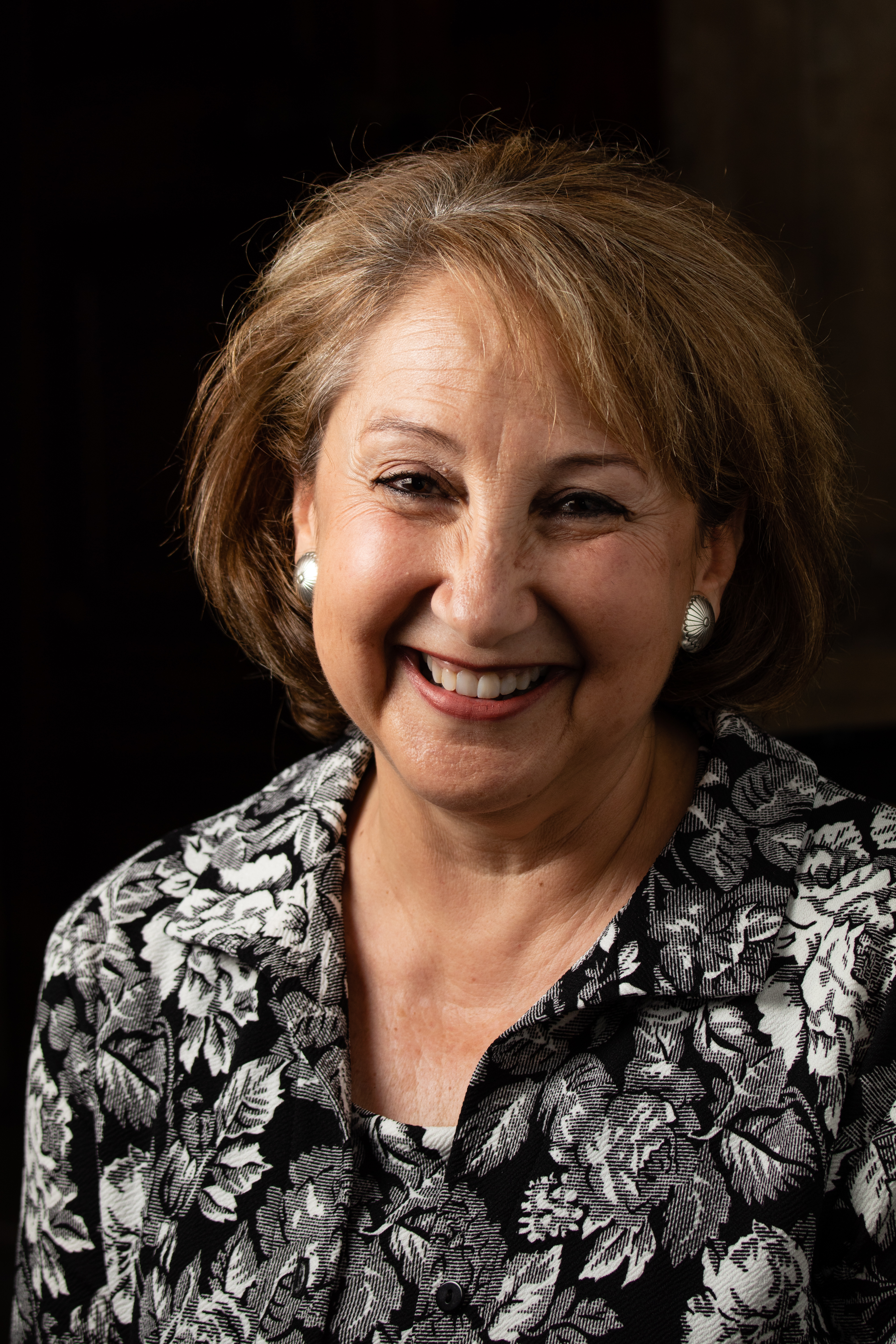
- Horwitz at the 2018 Pulitzer Prizes
- Born: Tucson
- Occupation: Journalist
- Awards: Pulitzer Prize for Investigative Reporting (Scott Higham, Sarah Cohen, 2002)

Sari Horwitz is an American journalist. She is a three-time Pulitzer Prize–winning member of The Washington Post's investigation unit. A reporter for The Washington Post since 1984, she has covered crime, homeland security, federal law enforcement, education, social services, and the U.S. Department of Justice.

== Career ==
Horwitz and fellow Post colleague Scott Higham shared the 2002 Pulitzer Prize for Investigative Reporting for their examination of the deaths of children in the D.C. foster care system. Horwitz also co-wrote an investigation of D.C. police shootings that won the 1999 Pulitzer for public service and the 1999 Selden Ring Award for Investigative Reporting. She was a member of the team of reporters who won the 2008 Pulitzer Prize for Breaking News Reporting for the shooting rampage at Virginia Tech. Horwitz co-authored the 2003 book, Sniper: Inside the Hunt for the Killers Who Terrorized the Nation. Among her other awards are the Robert F. Kennedy Journalism Award for reporting on the disadvantaged and the Investigative Reporters and Editors Medal.

Horwitz and Higham are co-authors of Finding Chandra: A True Washington Murder Mystery'. The non-fiction book, released in May 2010, chronicles the 2001 disappearance of Washington, DC intern Chandra Levy, whose remains were found one year later in an isolated area of the city's 2,800-acre (11 km^{2}) Rock Creek Park.

In 2011, Horwitz was temporarily suspended by The Washington Post for plagiarism after she copied parts of an article about Jared Loughner. The article was first published on March 4, 2011, in The Arizona Republic.

== Personal life ==
A native of Tucson, Arizona, Horwitz graduated from Bryn Mawr College and holds a master's degree in politics, philosophy and economy from Oxford University. She lives in Washington with her husband and daughter.
