= The Metaphysical Club: A Story of Ideas in America =

2001 book by Louis Menand

The Metaphysical Club
- Author: Louis Menand
- Publisher: Farrar, Straus and Giroux
- Publication date: 2001
- Media type: Print
- Pages: 384
- ISBN: 0-374-19963-9

The Metaphysical Club: A Story of Ideas in America is a 2001 book by Louis Menand, an American writer and legal scholar, which won the 2002 Pulitzer Prize for History. The book recounts the lives and intellectual work of the handful of thinkers primarily responsible for the philosophical concept of pragmatism, a principal feature of American philosophical achievement: William James, Oliver Wendell Holmes Jr., Charles Sanders Peirce, and John Dewey. Pragmatism had a significant influence on modern thought, by, for example, spurring movements in legal thought such as legal realism.

== Development ==
The book takes its title from societies for philosophical discussion that Peirce founded in 1872 in Cambridge, Massachusetts, and in 1879 at Johns Hopkins University. Peirce recalled the former 30 years later as being named the Metaphysical Club, and the latter officially bore that name.

Menand traces the biography of each of the members, showing ways in which they were connected and how all were influenced by their times and by thinkers such as Ralph Waldo Emerson. The book begins by examining the family history and early life of Oliver Wendell Holmes, Jr., future U.S. Supreme Court justice, then describes how Holmes, James, Peirce, Dewey, and others were acquainted with each other, and how their association led to James's development of pragmatism.

A main focus of the book is the influence of the American Civil War on Americans in general and on the subjects of this book, as well as how the war inspired pragmatism. For Holmes, the Civil War destroyed his entire perspective on the world and greatly shaped his judicial philosophy, which developed at roughly the same time that Dewey, James, and Peirce were beginning to develop pragmatist ideas. The book also addresses the emerging sciences of statistics and evolutionary biology.

== Criticism ==
Philosophers Susan Haack, Paul Boghossian, and Thomas L. Short have criticized Menand's portrayal of pragmatism. In a review of his earlier anthology Pragmatism: A Reader (1997), Haack criticized Menand's historical introduction for distorting the tradition of classical pragmatism into a form of "vulgar Rortyism". Short, in his review of The Metaphysical Club, echoed Haack and criticized Menand for following Rorty in pushing "the relativistic tendencies in James and Dewey to an extreme, 'postmodern' relativism." After a detailed analysis of the philosophical limitations of Menand's account of pragmatism, Boghossian concluded that "All of this book’s problems can be traced to its author’s weak command of the philosophical ideas whose history he wishes to recount."

== See also ==
- The Metaphysical Club

== Notes ==
Preceded by Founding Brothers	Pulitzer Prize for History; 2002	Succeeded by An Army at Dawn
