= Nicholas St. John Green =

American philosopher and lawyer

Nicholas St. John Green (March 30, 1830 – September 8, 1876) was an American philosopher and lawyer, one of the members of The Metaphysical Club. Green is known for his contributions in the field of law as well as his involvement in the formation of pragmatism. He has been named as the “grandfather of pragmatism” by Charles Peirce.

== Early life ==
Nicholas St. John Green, born March 30, 1830, in Dover, New Hampshire was a son of a Unitarian minister, James D. Green. Green earned the title of Bachelor of Arts on the Harvard University in 1851. After earning his law degree in 1861 he was a paymaster during the course of the Civil War.

== Career ==
After the war, Nicholas St. John Green published some of his articles in American Law Review, which allowed him to become a lecturer at the Harvard University in 1870. Three years later, he was given a position of professor of law at the University of Boston, which he accepted. While in Boston, he was also serving as the Acting Dean at the university. Green's notable work includes the notion of multiple causes for every event, an idea which stood in opposition to the then widely accepted notion of single chain of causation.

== Death ==
Nicholas St. John Green died on September 8, 1876, in Cambridge, Massachusetts.

== Selected works ==
=== Books ===
- St. John Green, Nicholas (1879). Criminal Law Reports: Being Reports of Cases Determined in the Federal and State Courts of the United States, and in the Courts of England, Ireland, Canada, Etc. with Notes, Volume 2. New York: Hurd and Houghton, 1874-1875. OCLC 22125148. Details.
- St. John Green, Nicholas (1933). Essays and notes on the law of tort and crime. Menasha, Wisconsin: George Banta Publishing Co. OCLC 1599039.

=== Journal articles ===
- St. John Green, Nicholas (January 1870). "Proximate and remote cause". American Law Review. 4 (2). Little, Brown and Company: 201–216.
- St. John Green, Nicholas (April 1870). "Contributory negligence on the part of an infant". American Law Review. 4 (3). Little, Brown and Company: 405–416.
- St. John Green, Nicholas (July 1871). "Insanity in criminal law: A review of A Treatise on the Medical Jurisprudence of Insanity, by I. Ray, fifth edition". American Law Review. 5 (4). Little, Brown and Company: 704–709.
- St. John Green, Nicholas (July 1871). "Some results of reform in indictments: A review of Precedents of Indictments and Pleas by Francis Wharton". American Law Review. 5 (4). Little, Brown and Company: 732–735.
- St. John Green, Nicholas (July 1872). "Married women: A review of Commentaries on the Law of Married Women under the Statutes of the Several States and at Common Law and in Equity, by J.P. Bishop". American Law Review. 6 (1). Little, Brown and Company: 57–74.
- St. John Green, Nicholas (July 1872). "Slander and libel: A review of A Treatise on the Wrongs called Slander and Libel, by John Townsend, second edition". American Law Review. 6 (4). Little, Brown and Company: 593–613.
- St. John Green, Nicholas (April 1874). "Torts under the French law: A review of Traité Général de la Responsabilité ou de l'Action en Dommages-in-térêts en dehors des Contracts, by M.A. Sourdat". American Law Review. 8. Little, Brown and Company: 508–529.
