= Gerald Fisher =

American judge

Senior Judge of the Superior Court of the District of Columbia
- Incumbent
- Assumed office August 31, 2022

Associate Judge of the Superior Court of the District of Columbia
- In office January 15, 2001 – August 31, 2022
- President: Bill Clinton
- Preceded by: Richard A. Levie
- Succeeded by: Tanya Jones Bosier

Personal details
- Born: July 14, 1950 (age 74); Newport News, Virginia, U.S.
- Education: College of William and Mary (BA); Columbus School of Law (JD)

Gerald I. Fisher (born July 14, 1950) is a senior judge of the Superior Court of the District of Columbia. He served an associate judge between 2001 and 2022.

== Education and career ==
Fisher earned his Bachelor of Arts from College of William and Mary in 1972 and his Juris Doctor from Columbus School of Law in 1978.

After graduating, he clerked for Judge J. Walter Yeagley of the D.C. Court of Appeals.

=== D.C. Superior Court ===
President Bill Clinton nominated Fisher on June 26, 2000, to a 15-year term as an associate judge on the Superior Court of the District of Columbia to the seat vacated by Richard A. Levie. On September 13, 2000, the Senate Committee on Homeland Security and Governmental Affairs held a hearing on his nomination. On September 27, 2000, the Committee reported his nomination favorably to the senate floor. On October 26, 2000, the full Senate confirmed his nomination by voice vote. He was sworn in on January 15, 2001. Fisher was submitted for an reappointment in November, 2015 under President Barack Obama. Fisher retired on August 31, 2022 and took senior status.

=== Academia ===
Fisher is a lecturer for Georgetown’s Continuing Legal Education program and has been a faculty member for the Harvard Law School Trial Advocacy Workshop, the California Western University Law School Criminal Trial Advocacy Program, and the Santa Clara University Death Penalty College. He also has taught Evidence at the Peking University School of Transnational Law. Additionally, he has been an adjunct professor at the Law Center since spring 1987.

Legal offices
Preceded by Richard A. Levie	Judge of the Superior Court of the District of Columbia; 2001–2022	Succeeded by Tanya Jones Bosier
