= Carl Dennis =

American poet and educator

- Born: September 17, 1939 (age 86); St. Louis, Missouri
- Education: Oberlin College; University of Chicago; University of Minnesota (BA); University of California, Berkeley (MA, PhD)
- Occupations: Poet and college professor
- Notable work: Practical Gods

Carl Dennis (born September 17, 1939) is an American poet and educator. His book Practical Gods won the 2002 Pulitzer Prize for poetry.

== Life and work ==
Born in St. Louis, Missouri, on September 17, 1939, Dennis attended Oberlin College and the University of Chicago before receiving his bachelor's degree from the University of Minnesota in 1961. In 1966, Dennis received his Ph.D. in English literature from the University of California, Berkeley. That same year he became an assistant professor of English at University at Buffalo, where he has spent most of his career; in 2002, he became an artist-in-residence there. Dennis has also served on the faculty of the graduate program at Warren Wilson College.

Dennis has received several prizes for his poetry in addition to the Pulitzer Prize for Poetry, including a Fellowship at the Rockefeller Study Center in Bellagio, Italy, a Guggenheim Fellowship (1984), a National Endowment for the Arts Fellowship in Poetry (1988), and the Ruth Lilly Poetry Prize (2000).

Dennis is the brother of composer Robert Dennis.

== Dennis's poetry ==
Dennis writes often of quotidian, middle-class life, but beneath the modest, reasonably lighted surfaces of the poems lie unexpected possibilities that create contrast and vibrancy. An example from his 1984 collection The Near World is "The Man on My Porch Makes Me an Offer", which begins:

Above all houses in our town
I've always loved this blue one you own
With its round turret and big bay window.
Do you dream about it the way I do?
Wouldn't you be just as happy
On a street with more trees
In a larger house, whose columned porch
Impresses every passer-by?
Does it seem fair that you've won the right
To gaze from these windows your whole life
Merely because you saw them first,
And consign me to a life of envy?

William Slaughter has given a close reading of this poem in an essay comparing poems by William Stafford, Dennis, and Louis Simpson. The form of Dennis's poem—a plainspoken, dramatic monologue—is fairly characteristic of his poetry. In the poem "Progressive Health" (from Practical Gods) Dennis uses a similar approach for a proposition that is a bioethicist's nightmare.

In some of his more recent poems, Dennis invokes guardian angels and other domestic deities. In a 2004 review, David Orr wrote:

In "The God Who Loves You," his strongest poem in this vein, Dennis avoids bathos by deftly changing the focus from our own anguish at missed opportunities to the grief of the god who loves us. As the poet reminds us:

The difference between what is
And what could have been will remain alive for him
Even after you cease existing, after you catch a chill
Running out in the snow for the morning paper
Losing eleven years that the god who loves you
Will feel compelled to imagine scene by scene.

Dennis's language here is so quiet and straightforward that when he alters course yet again to imagine the transformation of a god in the mind of his reader, the change seems natural. This is public poetry that sounds private—an achievement that's easy to underestimate.

In a 1984 review, Tom Sleigh addressed the originality of Dennis's art:

The reader feels hemmed in by Mr. Dennis's laconic truths because they make visible the narrow cage of circumstance and contingency in which we live. Many poets attempt this, but how many succeed? His distinctive force originates in his insidious determination to stay inside that cage, to map it inch by inch and find there—or nowhere—the justifications for human action.

== Bibliography ==
- A House of My Own. George Braziller. 1974. ISBN 9780807607534.
- Climbing Down. George Braziller. 1976. ISBN 9780807608142.
- Signs and Wonders. Princeton University Press. 1979.
- The Near World. William Morrow. 1985. ISBN 9780688048242.
- The Outskirts of Troy. William Morrow. 1988.
- Meetings with Time. Viking Penguin. 1992. ISBN 9780670843985.
- Ranking the Wishes. Penguin. 1997. ISBN 9780140587791. OCLC 35673505.
- Practical Gods. Penguin. 2001. ISBN 9780141002309. OCLC 469134500.
- Poetry as Persuasion, an Essay for Writers. University of Georgia Press. 2001. ISBN 9780820322483. OCLC 928383514.
- New and Selected Poems, 1974-2004. Penguin. 2004. ISBN 9780142000830. OCLC 52773666.
- Unknown Friends. Penguin. 2007. ISBN 978-0143038757. OCLC 71146622.
- Callings. Penguin. 2010. ISBN 978-0143118381. OCLC 567155180.
- Another Reason. Penguin. 2014. ISBN 978-0143125228. OCLC 852238359.
- Night School. Penguin. 2018. ISBN 978-0143132356.
- Earthborn. Penguin. 2022. ISBN 978-0143137016.
- Earthly Virtues. Penguin. 2026. ISBN 9780143138495.
