= Louis Menand =

American critic, essayist, and professor (born 1952)

- Born: January 21, 1952 (age 74); Syracuse, New York, U.S.
- Occupations: Critic; essayist; professor
- Awards: Pulitzer Prize for History (2002); National Humanities Medal (2015)

Academic background
- Education: Pomona College (BA); Columbia University (MA, PhD)

Academic work
- Institutions: Harvard University
- Notable works: The Metaphysical Club: A Story of Ideas in America
- Website: louismenand.com

Louis Menand (/ˈluːi məˈnænd/; born January 21, 1952) is an American critic, essayist, and professor who wrote the Pulitzer-winning book The Metaphysical Club (2001), an intellectual and cultural history of late 19th- and early 20th-century America.

== Life and career ==
Menand was born in Syracuse, New York, and raised around Boston, Massachusetts. His mother, Catherine (Shults) Menand, was a historian who wrote a biography of Samuel Adams. His father, Louis Menand III, taught political science at the Massachusetts Institute of Technology. His grandfather and great-grandfather owned the Louis Menand House, located in Menands, New York, and listed on the National Register of Historic Places in 1985. The village of Menands is named after his great-grandfather, a 19th-century horticulturist.

A 1973 graduate of Pomona College, Menand attended Harvard Law School for one year (1973–1974) before he left to earn Master of Arts (1975) and PhD (1980) degrees in English from Columbia University.

He thereafter taught at Princeton University and held staff positions at The New York Review of Books (contributing editor 1994–2001) and The New Republic (associate editor 1986–1987). He has contributed to The New Yorker since 1991 and remains a staff writer. In 1988 he was appointed a Distinguished Professor of English at the Graduate Center of the City University of New York, and in 1990 he was awarded a Guggenheim Fellowship. He left CUNY to accept a post in the English Department at Harvard University in 2003. He has also taught at Columbia, Queens College, the University of Virginia School of Law.

He published his first book, Discovering Modernism: T. S. Eliot and His Context, in 1987. His second book, The Metaphysical Club: A Story of Ideas in America (2001), includes detailed biographical material on Oliver Wendell Holmes Jr., William James, Charles Sanders Peirce, and John Dewey, and documents their roles in the development of the philosophy of pragmatism. It received the 2002 Pulitzer Prize for History, the 2002 Francis Parkman Prize, and The Heartland Prize for Non-Fiction. In 2002 Menand published American Studies, a collection of essays on prominent figures in American culture.

He is the Anne T. and Robert M. Bass Professor of English at Harvard. In 2018 he was appointed for a 5-year term to the Lee Simpkins Family professorship of Arts and Sciences. His principal field of academic interest is 19th and 20th century American cultural history. He teaches literary theory and postwar cultural history at both the graduate and undergraduate level. At Harvard he helped co-found a freshman course with content in literature and philosophy, Humanities 10: An Introductory Humanities Colloquium. He also served as co-chair on the Task Force on General Education at Harvard working on a new general education curriculum.

In consultation with the National Endowment for the Humanities, President Barack Obama awarded him the National Humanities Medal in 2015.

In 2021, Menand's book The Free World: Art and Thought in the Cold War was published. Mark Grief's review in The Atlantic described the book as a "monumental new study of cold war culture," covering "art, literature, music, and thought from 1945 to 1965."

== Bibliography ==
=== Books ===
- Menand, Louis (1987). Discovering Modernism: T. S. Eliot and His Context. Oxford: Oxford University Press. ISBN 0195040694.
- —, ed. (1996). The Future of Academic Freedom. Chicago: University of Chicago Press. ISBN 0226520048.
- —, ed. (1997). Pragmatism: A Reader. New York: Vintage Books. ISBN 0679775447.
- — (2001). The Metaphysical Club: A Story of Ideas in America. New York: Farrar, Straus and Giroux. ISBN 0374199639.
- — (2002). American Studies. New York: Farrar, Straus and Giroux. ISBN 0374104344.
- — (2010). The Marketplace of Ideas: Reform and Resistance in the American University. New York: W. W. Norton & Company. ISBN 9780393062755.
- — (2021). The Free World: Art and Thought in the Cold War. New York: Farrar, Straus and Giroux. ISBN 9780374722913.

=== Essays and reporting ===
- Menand, Louis (November 14, 2011). "Getting real". The Critics. A Critic at Large. The New Yorker. 87 (36): 76–83. Reviews Gaddis, John Lewis. George F. Kennan : an American life. Penguin.
- — (July 2, 2012). "Silence, exile, punning : James Joyce's chance encounters". The Critics. A Critic at Large. The New Yorker. 88 (19): 70–75.
- — (March 4, 2013). "How the Deal went down : saving democracy in the Depression". The Critics. Books. The New Yorker. 89 (3): 69–74. Reviews Katznelson, Ira. Fear itself : the New Deal and the origins of our time. Liveright.
- — (July 8–15, 2013). "The color of law : voting rights and the Southern way of life". The Critics. A Critic at Large. The New Yorker. 89 (20): 80–89.
- — (September 30, 2013). "Nukes of hazard". The Critics. Books. The New Yorker. 89 (30): 76–80. Reviews Schlosser, Eric (2013). Command and Control. Penguin. ISBN 9781594202278.
- — (October 21, 2013). "The Norman invasion : the crazy career of Norman Mailer". The Critics. A Critic at Large. The New Yorker. 89 (33): 86–95.
- — (March 24, 2014). "The de Man case : does a critic's past explain his criticism?". The Critics. A Critic at Large. The New Yorker. 90 (5): 87–93.
- — (October 20, 2014). "Crooner in rights spat : are copyright laws too strict?". The Critics. A Critic at Large. The New Yorker. 90 (32): 84–89.
- — (March 23, 2015). "A friend of the Devil : inside a famous Cold War deception". The Critics. A Critic at Large. The New Yorker. 91 (5): 84–90. (Note: Online version is titled "When the C.I.A. duped college students".)
- — (June 20, 2016). "What it is like to like : art and taste in the age of the Internet". The Critics. Books. The New Yorker. 92 (18): 73–76.
- — (October 10, 2016). "He's back : Karl Marx, yesterday and today". The Critics. A Critic at Large. The New Yorker. 92 (32): 90–97. (Note: Online version is titled "Karl Marx, yesterday and today".)
- — (May 1, 2017). "Op de stez : Norman Podhoretz's classic success story". The Critics. Books. The New Yorker. 93 (11): 63–69. (Note: Online version is titled "The book that scandalized the New York intellectuals".)
- — (February 26, 2018). "Made in Vietnam : Edward Lansdale and the war over the war". The Critics. Books. The New Yorker. 96 (15): 63–69. Reviews Max Boot, The Road Not Taken: Edward Lansdale and the American Tragedy in Vietnam, Liveright / W.W. Norton & Co., 2018).
- — (September 30, 2019). "Merit badges : is higher education an engine of social injustice?". The Critics. Books. The New Yorker: 75–80. (Note: Reviews Tough, Paul, The years that matter most. Houghton Mifflin Harcourt., Markovitz, Daniel, The meritocracy trap. Penguin.)
- — (June 1, 2020). "The Big Heinie : how Babe Ruth and Lou Gehrig brought stardom to America's pastime". The Critics. Books. The New Yorker. 96 (15): 54–59. (Note: Online version is titled "How baseball players became celebrities".)
- — (March 22, 2021). "Change your life : the lessons of the New Left". American Chronicles. The New Yorker. 97 (5): 46–53. (Note: Online version is titled "The making of the New Left".)
- — (August 22, 2022). "Drawing lines : our undemocratic democracy". The Critics. A Critic at Large. The New Yorker. 98 (25): 65–68. (Note: Online version is titled "American democracy was never designed to be democratic".)
- — (September 19, 2022). "Disgraced: What Happened to Rudy Giuliani?". American Chronicles. The New Yorker. 98 (30): 71–75. (Note: Online version is titled "Was Rudy Giuliani Always So Awful?".)
- — (February 6, 2023). "Making the news : the press, the state, and the state of the press". The Critics. A Critic at Large. The New Yorker. 98 (48): 59–65. (Note: Online version is titled "When Americans lost faith in the news".)
- — (November 20, 2023). "The war on Chaplin". The New Yorker. 99 (38): 60–64. (Note: Review of Scott Eyman, Charlie Chaplin vs. America, Simon & Schuster, 2023.)
- — (July 22, 2024). "What Happened to the Yuppie?". The Critics. Books. The New Yorker. 100: 58–62. (Note: Online version is titled "When Yuppies Ruled".)
- — "How to Lose a War: Getting out of Vietnam was harder than getting in. Is there a lesson here?" (review of Elisa Tamarkin, Done in a Day: Telex from the Fall of Saigon, Chicago), The New Yorker, 20 April 2026, pp. 56–61.

———————

Bibliography notes
