= Sarah Cohen (journalist) =

American journalist and professor

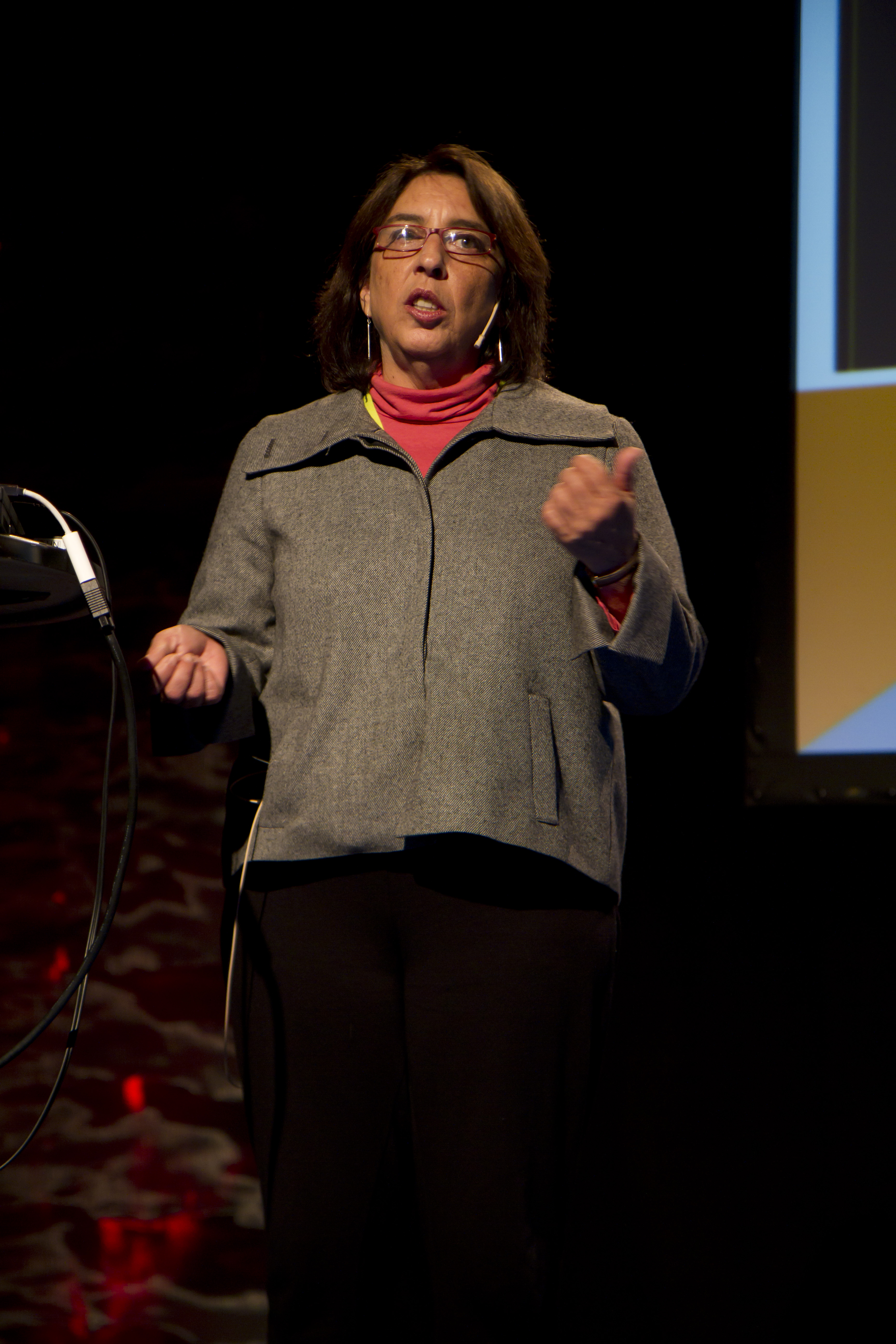
- Sarah Cohen in 2011
- Employers: Arizona State University; Duke University; The Tampa Tribune; The Washington Post

Sarah Cohen is an American journalist, author, and professor. Cohen is a proponent of, and teaches classes on, computational journalism and authored the book "Numbers in the Newsroom: Using math and statistics in the news".

She holds the Knight Chair of Data Journalism in the Walter Cronkite School of Journalism and Mass Communication at Arizona State University.

Previously she was an assistant editor for computer-assisted reporting at The New York Times and adjunct faculty at the Columbia University Graduate School of Journalism.

== Education ==
Cohen received an A.B. in economics from the University of North Carolina at Chapel Hill. After graduation, she worked as an economist (1980-1991) for the U.S. Bureau of Labor Statistics. In 1991 she returned to school at the University of Maryland's Philip Merrill College of Journalism, graduate program in public affairs reporting, and received her M.A. in journalism in 1992.

== Career ==
Cohen gained her first work experience, as a reporter, at The Tampa Tribune. She spent two years at the Tribune, before leaving to work for The St. Petersburg Times, where she worked as a reporter from 1994 to 1996.

In 1996, Cohen began a long record of service, working in different positions with the nonprofit organization, Investigative Reporters and Editors. She was the Training Director at the IRE from 1996-1998. From 2010-2018, she served as a member of the Board of Directors, including time as president.

During the same time, she worked as a reporter and database editor at The Washington Post, (1999-2009) then leaving to teach at Duke University, (2009-2012) where she was the Knight Professor of the Practice of Journalism and Public Policy. In 2012, Cohen joined The New York Times, as editor for computer-assisted reporting. She remained at the Times until 2017, before leaving to go back to teaching, as the Knight Chair, at the Walter Cronkite School of Journalism and Mass Communication at Arizona State University, in Phoenix, Arizona.

=== Cohen on data-driven reporting ===
In 2002, Scott Maier, wrote a short review about two books, including one that Cohen authored: "Numbers in the Newsroom: Using Math and Statistics in News." In his concluding remarks, he said that "all journalists need math." That conclusion is what Sarah Cohen emphasizes in interviews, training sessions, and in the courses that she teaches. She explains that "data journalism helps keep the work responsible which, in turn, contributes to credibility," especially in the current time of watchdog journalism, or accountability reporting.

Throughout her career, Cohen's work has been largely focused on data gathering and the use of computer-assisted journalism. Her methods have enabled her to "cut through a lot of clutter and display data in a more efficient way." In a 2009 interview, with Steve Myers, with the Poynter Institute, she gave examples to his question as to how a visual representation of data can help a reporter.

One example she used was how data can tell a reporter where to look for the story. She was with the Washington Post when they began to look at farm subsidies and who was receiving the money. Cohen explained :

"During a [2003] story on disaster payments in the farm subsidy system, we wanted to make sure that we went to places that had received the payments year after year after year. Using a database, we could find farms that had received multiple payments pretty easily. But looking at repeated images of density maps that I made of the payments, it was really obvious where to go — specific areas of North Dakota and Kansas."

In another example, where the data appeared to point to what might have been a serious problem, involving deaths at a detention center; a closer look at the data showed that there just happened to be more sick people who were sent there, negating the need to cover the story. She described what happened:

"Last year, [2006] when two reporters here were working on a story on deaths in detention centers, I made a simple Flash interactive that let them look at deaths on a map by age group, cause of death, year and a couple of other variables. It helped to be able to see whether certain kinds of deaths were centered in certain areas. It also helped show that what appeared to be a site of many deaths was really one where they sent very, very ill people, making it far less newsworthy and obvious that they should focus somewhere else."

Cohen says that as a street reporter, one must be familiar with public records, both in how to find them and how to make the correct requests, in order to use what is needed for data purposes. She stresses that as a reporter, you need to understand what to ask for. Additionally, Cohen doesn't think most reporters need to be experts but, they need to be "conversant with a spreadsheet."

Investigative and public affairs reporters are increasingly fact-checking to strengthen accountability, which requires training and resources. As newsrooms continue to cut staff, the need for reporters who can use data to help them with stories, is becoming more important as data-driven journalism becomes standard practice in most newspapers and news organizations.

== Awards ==
- 2001 Investigative Reporters and Editors Medal for "The District's Lost Children," with the staff of The Washington Post
- 2002 Pulitzer Prize for Investigative Reporting with the staff of The Washington Post, for a series that exposed the District of Columbia's role in the neglect and death of 229 children placed in protective care between 1993 and 2000, which prompted an overhaul of the city's child welfare system
- 2002 Robert F. Kennedy Award in Journalism for "The District's Lost Children," with the staff of The Washington Post
- 2005 Selden Ring Award for Investigative Reporting with the staff of The Washington Post, for their series exposing lead contamination in the District of Columbia water supply
- 2009 Goldsmith Prize for Investigative Reporting for "Forced Out," with the staff of The Washington Post, for their reporting on how Washington, D.C. landlords drove hundreds of tenants from rent-controlled apartments
- 2016 Gerald Loeb Award for Images/Graphics/Interactives, with the team members of The New York Times, "Making Data Visual,"
